= Coenogonium flammeum =

Scientific classification
- Kingdom: Fungi
- Division: Ascomycota
- Class: Lecanoromycetes
- Order: Gyalectales
- Family: Coenogoniaceae
- Genus: Coenogonium
- Species: C. flammeum

Binomial name
- Coenogonium flammeum L.I.Ferraro, Michlig & Lücking (2011)

Species of lichen

Coenogonium flammeum is a species of corticolous (bark-dwelling), crustose lichen in the family Harpidiaceae. It is found in Argentina.

== Taxonomy ==
The lichen was described as new to science in 2011 by the lichenologists Lidia Ferraro, Andrea Michlig, and Robert Lücking. The type specimen was collected by the first author from El Rey National Park in Salta, Argentina. The species epithet alludes to the deep orange-brown to red-brown colour of the apothecia.

== Description ==
Coenogonium flammeum is a crustose lichen with a smooth and shiny surface. It has a pale olive-grey colour and typically forms continuous patches that are thin and measure between 2 and 5 cm in diameter. This lichen is distinguished by its cartilaginous corticiform layer and the presence of a white prothallus at the border of the thallus.

The photobiont of this species is from the green algal genus Trentepohlia, whose angular to rounded cells are arranged in irregular plates or short threads, each about 6–10 μm in diameter. The apothecia, or spore-producing structures, are sessile and rounded, measuring 0.6–1.2 mm in diameter and 150–200 μm in height. These apothecia initially have a flat disc that later becomes slightly convex. The discs are deep orange-brown to red-brown in colour. The apothecia margins are thin, not prominent, and minutely denticulate (toothed), especially when young, and are cream-coloured.

The excipulum (the tissue surrounding the disc) is paraplectenchymatous with radiating rows of cells at the outer parts. It is 70–150 μm broad, colourless to pale orange at the periphery, and turns sordid yellow-brown when an iodine solution is applied. The outermost cells of the excipulum are elongated and thin-walled. The hypothecium (the tissue below the hymenium) is 15–25 μm high and ranges from colourless to pale yellowish. The hymenium itself is 90–100 μm high, colourless, and changes from pale blue to quickly sordid green and then reddish-brown with iodine staining.

The asci (spore-bearing cells) are about 70–80 μm long and 5–6 μm wide. The ascospores are uniseriate (arranged in a single row within the ascus), ellipsoidal, and have a single septum. They measure 8–11 by 2.5–3.5 μm and are about three to three and a half times as long as they are broad. No pycnidia (asexual reproductive structures) have been observed in this species. Thin-layer chromatography did not detect any lichen products.

== Habitat and distribution ==
Coenogonium flammeum was discovered in the northwestern region of Argentina, specifically within the montane rainforests known as the Yungas. This lichen species has been located in the provinces of Salta and Jujuy. The habitat where Coenogonium flammeum thrives is characterised by forests dominated by trees from the families Myrtaceae and Lauraceae, and the genus Podocarpus. These habitats experience a mean annual temperature of around 20 °C (68 °F) and receive substantial rainfall, with annual precipitation reaching up to 2,000 mm (79 in).
