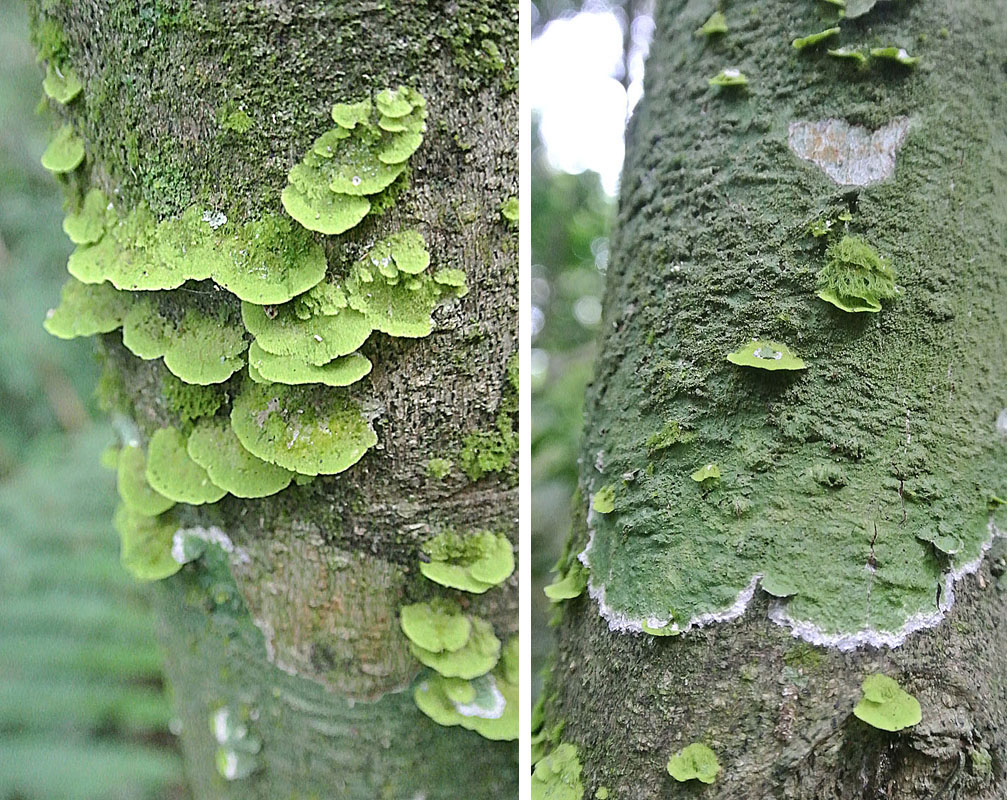
- Coenogonium linkii in Puerto Iguazú, Argentina

Scientific classification
- Kingdom: Fungi
- Division: Ascomycota
- Class: Lecanoromycetes
- Order: Gyalectales
- Family: Coenogoniaceae; Stizenb. (1862)
- Genus: Coenogonium; Ehrenb. (1820)

Type species
- Coenogonium linkii Ehrenb. (1820)

Synonyms
- Biatorinopsis Müll.Arg. (1881); Coenogoniomycella Cif. & Tomas. (1954); Coenogoniomyces Cif. & Tomas. (1954); Coenomycogonium Cif. & Tomas. (1954); Didymopycnomyces Cavalc. & A.A.Silva (1972); Dimerella Trevis. (1880); Flabellomyces Kobayasi (1982); Gyalecta sect. Lecaniopsis Vain. (1890); Gyalectella J.Lahm (1883); Holocoenis Clem. (1909); Lecaniopsis (Vain.) Zahlbr. (1926); Microphiale (Stizenb.) J.Steiner (1897); Mycocoenogonium Cif. & Tomas. (1954); Secoliga sect. Microphiale Stizenb. (1862)

= Coenogonium =

Genus of lichen

Coenogonium is a genus of filamentous lichens in the monotypic family Coenogoniaceae. It has about 90 species. Most species are leaf-dwelling or grow on bark, although a few are known to grow on rocks under certain conditions, and some are restricted to growth on termite nests. The genus was circumscribed in 1820 by German naturalist Christian Gottfried Ehrenberg.

Coenogonium has a worldwide distribution, with most species known from tropical areas. Most species grow in tropical rainforests in the shaded understorey. They typically grow on tree trunks, branches, lianas, and leaves.

== Description ==
Although members of Coenogonium are relatively easy to identify given its unique characteristics, identifying to species is more difficult due to the slight differences between them. The genus is characterized by biatorine (rarely zeorine), yellow to orange or brown apothecia with a paraplectenchymatous excipulum, partially amyloid hymenium (I+ blue then quickly sordid green then red-brown), thin-walled unitunicate asci, and 1-septate or rarely non-septate ascospores. The photobiont component of Coenogonium is a green alga from the family Trentepohliaceae. The structure of the Coenogonium thallus is largely determined by the algal partner.

Similar genera include Malcolmiella, which differs mainly by having amyloid asci with a thickened tholus and non-septate, usually longer and broader ascospores with an ornamented perispore; Absconditella, which has a chlorococcoid photobiont and non-amyloid asci; and Cryptodiscus, which has Gloeocystis as photobiont, amyloid asci with a thickened apex and non-septate paraphyses.

== Research ==
Species of Coenogonium have frequently used in morphological/anatomical and ecophysiological studies. Examples include thallus growth, apothecial development, ultrastructure, photobiont and resynthesis in culture, and photosynthesis. The filamentous thalli of Coenogonium serve as a home for diatoms and other microorganisms. Johannes Müller Argoviensis even used his erroneous interpretation of the thallus organization of filamentous Coenogonium to oppose Simon Schwendener's theory of the symbiotic nature of lichens.

== Species ==
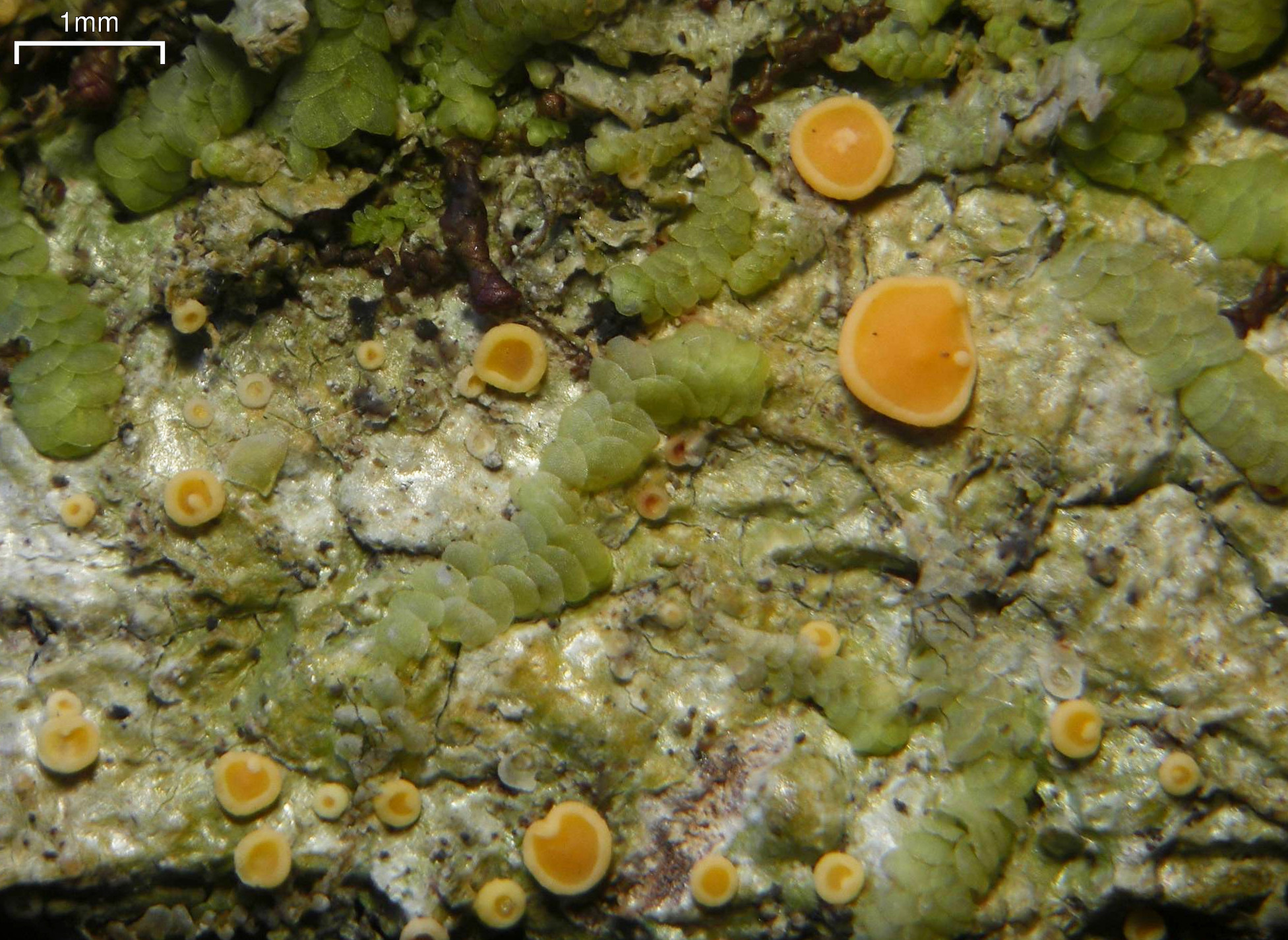
Coenogonium luteum, Alligator River National Wildlife Refuge, North Carolina

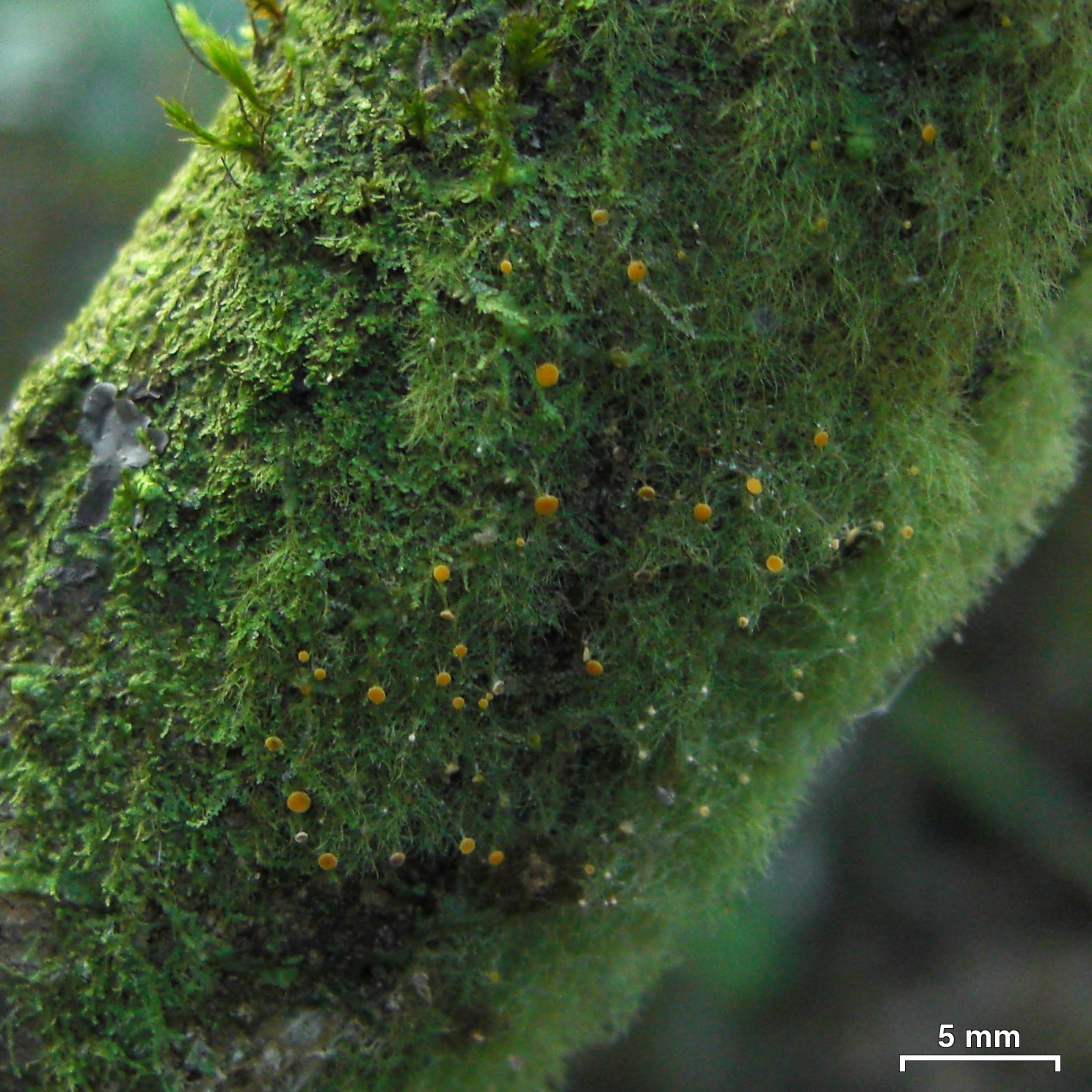
Coenogonium interplexum, Fakahatchee Strand Preserve State Park, Florida

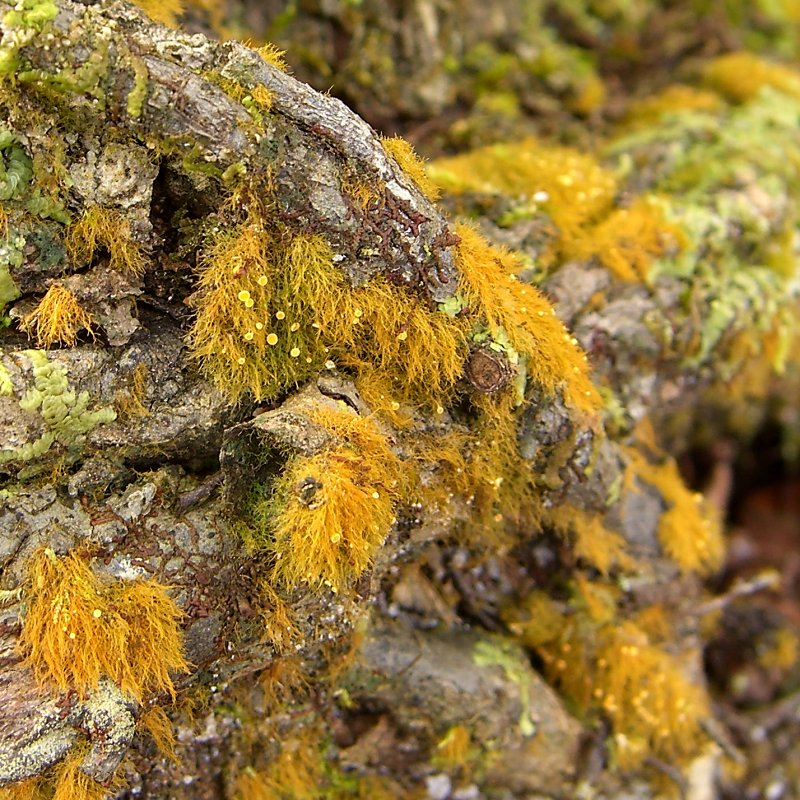
Pixie-hair lichen, genus Coenogonium, Florida Panhandle

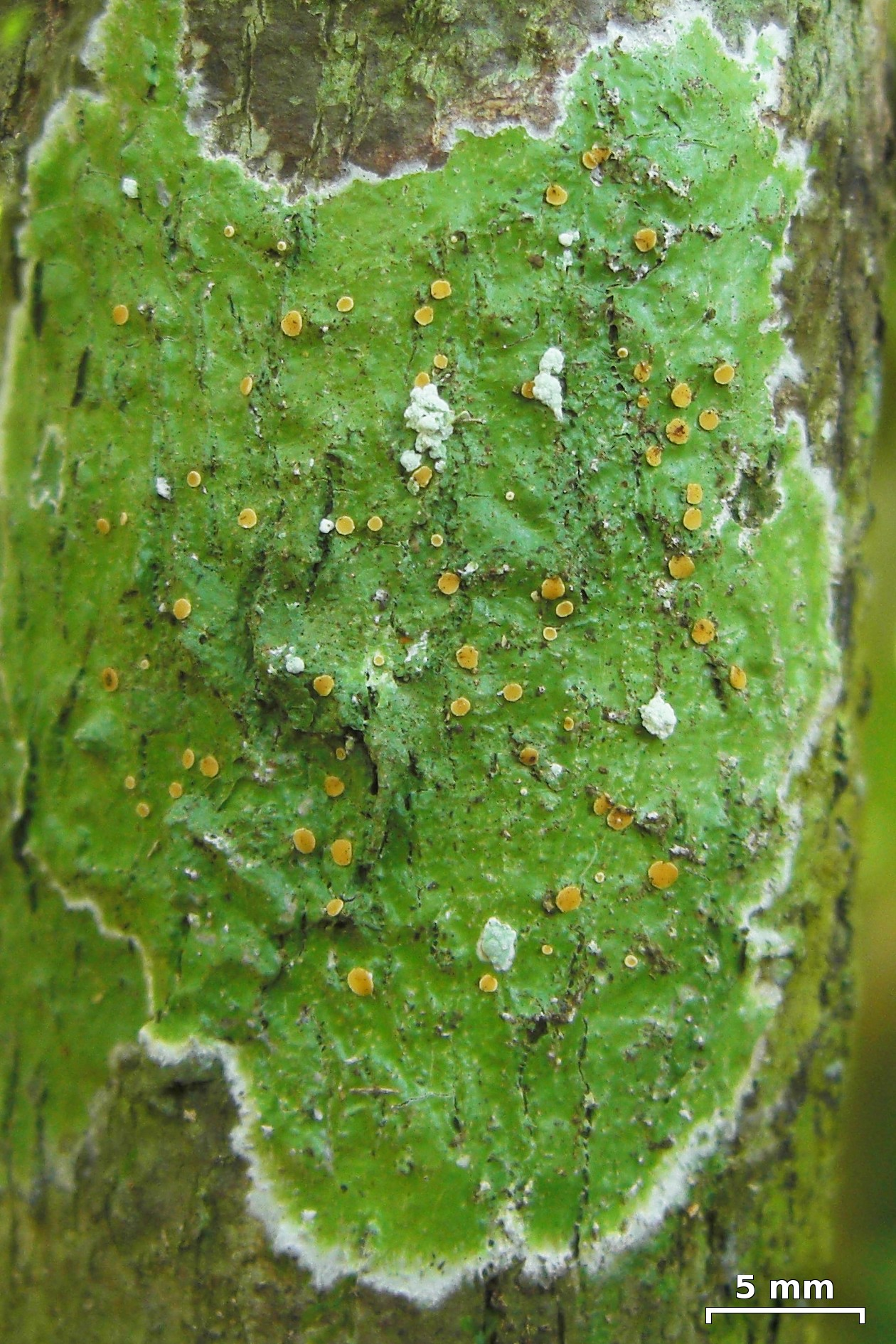
Coenogonium (not identified to species), Amazon rainforest, Peru

The genus is well known in continental areas that border the Caribbean, such as Florida and Costa Rica. About half of the world's biodiversity of this genus occurs in Brazil.

- Coenogonium aciculatum Lücking & Aptroot (2006) – Costa Rica
- Coenogonium agonimioides J.P.Halda, S.O.Oh & Hur (2016)
- Coenogonium albomarginatum Michlig & L.I.Ferraro (2013)
- Coenogonium antonianum Lücking, Aptroot & Sipman (2006)
- Coenogonium atherospermatis Kantvilas, Rivas Plata & Lücking (2018) – Australia
- Coenogonium atroluteum (Vain.) Lücking, Aptroot & Sipman (2006) – Neotropics
- Coenogonium aurantiacum Merc.-Díaz & Lücking (2013) – Puerto Rico
- Coenogonium australiense Kantvilas & Lücking (2018) – Australia
- Coenogonium bacilliferum (Malme) Lücking, Aptroot & Sipman (2006)
- Coenogonium barbatellum Kalb (2007)
- Coenogonium barbatum Lücking, Aptroot & L.Umaña (2006) – Costa Rica
- Coenogonium beaverae Lücking & Diederich (2017)
- Coenogonium borinquense Merc.-Díaz & Lücking (2013) – Puerto Rico
- Coenogonium botryosum C.Knight (1886)
- Coenogonium brasiliense L.I.Ferraro & Michlig (2013)
- Coenogonium bryophilum Kalb & Aptroot (2018) – Australia
- Coenogonium byssothallinum Aptroot & Lücking (2006) – Costa Rica
- Coenogonium carassense D.O.Lima, Aptroot, Lücking & M.Cáceres (2023) – Brazil
- Coenogonium chloroticum Xavier-Leite, M.Cáceres & Aptroot (2013) – Brazil
- Coenogonium ciliatum Kalb & Lücking (2000)
- Coenogonium confervoides Nyl. (1858)
- Coenogonium convexum J.Kalb & Kalb (2016) – Thailand
- Coenogonium coppinsii Aptroot & M.Cáceres (2014) – Brazil
- Coenogonium coralloideum Kalb (2007)
- Coenogonium coronatum G.Neuwirth & Stock.-Wörg. (2014)
- Coenogonium curvulum Zahlbr. (1928)
- Coenogonium dattatreyense Shravan Kumar & Y.L.Krishnam. (2015)
- Coenogonium davidii Kalb (2007)
- Coenogonium degeneri (Kalb & Vězda) Kalb & Lücking (2006)
- Coenogonium dilucidum (Kremp.) Kalb & Lücking (2000)
- Coenogonium dimorphicum Merc.-Díaz & Lücking (2013) – Puerto Rico
- Coenogonium disciforme Papong, Boonpr. & Lücking (2007) – Thailand
- Coenogonium eximium (Nyl.) Kalb & Lücking (2006)– Neotropics
- Coenogonium fallaciosum (Müll. Arg.) Kalb & Lücking (2000)
- Coenogonium flammeum L.I.Ferraro, Michlig & Lücking (2011)
- Coenogonium flavicans (Vězda & Farkas) Kalb & Lücking (2000)
- Coenogonium flavovirens L.I.Ferraro & Michlig (2013)
- Coenogonium flavoviride M.Cáceres & Lücking (2000)
- Coenogonium flavum (Malcolm & Vězda) Malcolm (2004)
- Coenogonium frederici (Kalb) Kalb & Lücking (2006)
- Coenogonium fruticulosum L.Ludw. (2014) – New Zealand
- Coenogonium fuscescens (Vězda & Malcolm) Malcolm (2004)
- Coenogonium geralense (Henn.) Lücking (2008) – pantropical
- Coenogonium hainanense X.H.Wu & Z.F.Jia (2019) – China
- Coenogonium hypophyllum (Vězda) Kalb & Lücking (2000)
- Coenogonium implexum Nyl. (1862)
- Coenogonium interplexum Nyl. (1862)
- Coenogonium interpositum Nyl. (1862)
- Coenogonium isidiatum (G.Thor & Vězda) Lücking, Aptroot & Sipman (2006)
- Coenogonium isidiiferum (Lücking) Lücking (2001)
- Coenogonium isidiigerum (Vězda & Osorio) Lücking, Aptroot & Sipman (2006)
- Coenogonium isidiosum (Breuss) Rivas Plata, Lücking, L.Umaña & Chaves (2006)
- Coenogonium itabaianense D.O.Lima, Aptroot, Lücking & M.Cáceres (2023) – Brazil
- Coenogonium kalbii Aptroot, Lücking & L.Umaña (2006) – Costa Rica
- Coenogonium kawanae (H.Harada & Vězda) H.Harada & Lumbsch (2004)
- Coenogonium kiggaense Shravan Kumar & Y.L.Krishnam. (2015)
- Coenogonium labyrinthicum Lücking & Kalb (2001)
- Coenogonium linkii Ehrenb. (1820)
- Coenogonium lisowskii (Vězda) Lücking (2001)
- Coenogonium lueckingii Y.Joshi, Gagarina, J.P.Halda & Hur (2015) – South Korea
- Coenogonium luteocitrinum Rivas Plata, Lücking & L.Umaña (2006) – Neotropics
- Coenogonium luteolum (Kalb) Kalb & Lücking (2006) – Europe
- Coenogonium lutescens (Vězda & Malcolm) Malcolm (2004)
- Coenogonium luteum (Dicks.) Kalb & Lücking (2000)
- Coenogonium magdalenae Rivas Plata, Lücking & Lizano (2006) – Costa Rica
- Coenogonium maritimum Seavey & J.Seavey (2017) – Florida
- Coenogonium minidenticulatum Aptroot & M. Cáceres (2016)
- Coenogonium minimum (Müll.Arg.) Lücking (2008)
- Coenogonium minutissimum Kalb (2007)
- Coenogonium moniliforme Tuck. (1862)
- Coenogonium nepalense (G.Thor & Vězda) Lücking, Aptroot & Sipman (2006) – Neotropics and eastern Paleotropics
- Coenogonium nimisii Malíček & Sanderson (2023) – Great Britain; Ireland
- Coenogonium perminutum (Malme) Lücking, Aptroot & Sipman (2006)
- Coenogonium persistens (Malme) Lücking, Aptroot & Sipman (2006) – Neotropics
- Coenogonium pertenue (Stirt.) Kalb & Lücking (2006)
- Coenogonium piliferum (Vězda) Kalb & Lücking (2000)
- Coenogonium pilosum D.O.Lima, Aptroot, Lücking & M.Cáceres (2023) – Brazil
- Coenogonium pineti (Ach.) Lücking & Lumbsch (2004)
- Coenogonium platysporum Kalb (2007)
- Coenogonium pocsii (Vězda & Farkas) Lücking, Aptroot & Sipman (2006) – African Paleotropics
- Coenogonium portoricense Merc.-Díaz & Lücking (2013) – Puerto Rico
- Coenogonium pulchrum (Müll.Arg.) Kalb (2001)
- Coenogonium pusillum (Mont.) Lücking, Aptroot & Sipman (2006)
- Coenogonium pyrophthalmum (Mont.) Lücking, Aptroot & Sipman (2006)
- Coenogonium queenslandicum (Kalb & Vězda) Lücking (2001) – eastern Paleotropics
- Coenogonium riparium (Vain.) Kalb (2007)
- Coenogonium roumeguerianum (Müll.Arg.) Kalb (2001)
- Coenogonium rubrofuscum (Vězda & Malcolm) Malcolm (2005)
- Coenogonium saepincola Aptroot, Sipman & Lücking (2006) – Costa Rica
- Coenogonium seychellense Farkas (2014)
- Coenogonium siquirrense (Lücking) Lücking (2008)
- Coenogonium stenosporum (Malme) Lücking, Aptroot & Sipman (2006) – Neotropics
- Coenogonium stramineum (Aptroot & Seaward) Lücking, Aptroot & Sipman (2006) – Seychelles
- Coenogonium strigosum Rivas Plata, Lücking & Chaves (2006) – Neotropics
- Coenogonium subborinquense J.Kalb & Kalb (2016) – Thailand
- Coenogonium subdentatum (Vězda & G.Thor) Rivas Plata, Lücking, L.Umaña & Chaves (2006) – Neotropics; eastern Paleotropics
- Coenogonium subdilucidum Farkas & Vězda (2014)
- Coenogonium subdilutum (Malme) Kalb (2001)
- Coenogonium subdilutum (Malme) Lücking, Aptroot & Sipman (2006)
- Coenogonium subfallaciosum (Vězda & Farkas) Lücking, Aptroot & Sipman (2006)
- Coenogonium subluteum (Rehm) Kalb & Lücking (2000)
- Coenogonium subsquamosum (Aptroot & Seaward) Lücking, Aptroot & Sipman (2006) – Seychelles
- Coenogonium subzonatum (Lücking) Lücking & Kalb (2001)
- Coenogonium tanzanicum (Vězda & Farkas) Lücking & Kalb (2002)
- Coenogonium tavaresianum (Vězda) Lücking, Aptroot & Sipman (2006)
- Coenogonium theae (Räsänen) Gagarina (2015)
- Coenogonium upretianum M.Cáceres & Aptroot (2018) – Brazil
- Coenogonium urceolatum Kantvilas, Rivas Plata & Lücking (2018) – Australia
- Coenogonium usambarense (Vězda & Farkas) Lücking & Kalb (2001) – African and eastern Paleotropics
- Coenogonium velutinellum Lücking, N.Marín & Álvaro (2023) – Colombia
- Coenogonium verrucimarginatum J.Kalb & Kalb (2016) – Thailand
- Coenogonium verrucosum Michlig & L.I.Ferraro (2013) – South America
- Coenogonium vezdanum (Lücking) Lücking (2008)
- Coenogonium weberi (Vězda) Lücking, Aptroot & Sipman (2006)
- Coenogonium wernerhuberi Breuss & G.Neuwirth (2012) – Costa Rica
- Coenogonium wrightii (Vězda) H.Harada & Lumbsch (2004)
- Coenogonium zonatum (Müll.Arg.) Kalb & Lücking (2000)
