= Lithothelium bermudense =

Scientific classification
- Kingdom: Fungi
- Division: Ascomycota
- Class: Eurotiomycetes
- Order: Pyrenulales
- Family: Pyrenulaceae
- Genus: Lithothelium
- Species: L. bermudense

Binomial name
- Lithothelium bermudense F.Berger, LaGreca & Aptroot (2016)
- Holotype: Hamilton Parish, Bermuda

Species of lichen

Lithothelium bermudense is a species of lichen in the family Pyrenulaceae. The lichen grows within the surface layers of limestone (endolithic), appearing as small pink to pale brown spots, and is known only from coastal forests in Bermuda. It was discovered in 2007 at the Walsingham Nature Reserve and formally described as a new species in 2016. The species is distinguished from related lichens by the diamond-shaped inner chambers (lumina) of its ascospores, and its preference for limestone.

== Taxonomy ==
Lithothelium bermudense was described as new to science in 2016 by Franz Berger, Scott LaGreca, and André Aptroot from material collected in 2007 along the Tom Moore Trail in the Walsingham Nature Reserve, Bermuda. The specific epithet refers to Bermuda. The species was placed in the genus Lithothelium because of its endolithic habit and brown, distoseptate ascospores, and it is contrasted with several similar species: it differs from L. australe in having clavate asci and diamond-shaped spore cavities (lumina); from L. austropacificum by occurring on limestone, lacking a visible thallus, and developing a true median septum (euseptum); and from L. echinatum in having larger spores without surface ornamentation. In broader context, molecular work published in 2016 indicated that Lithothelium as then circumscribed was polyphyletic, so future generic limits may change.

== Description ==
The lichen grows within the surface of calcareous rock (endolithic), presenting externally as a faint pink to pale brown spot up to about 2 cm across; no prothallus is visible. Its photosynthetic partner is a Trentepohlia alga with cells around 8 micrometers (μm) in diameter. The fruiting bodies (perithecia) are single, conical, and black; at about 0.4–0.6 mm across they sit mostly submerged in the rock and leave tiny dark pits. they leave small black pits and have a brittle, carbonised wall in which the exciple and involucrellum are integrated. The ostiole is small and centrally placed. Under the microscope the paraphyses are simple and slender. The asci are about 110 × 25–30 μm, cylindrical to club shaped, with a rounded ocular chamber, and typically hold 6 to 8 spores. The ascospores are fusiform, reddish-brown (darkening in KOH) and typically 20–25 × 7–8 μm. They show three internal partitions in the spore wall (distosepta) that give the inner lumina a distinctive diamond shape; during maturation a true median septum develops, and in over-mature spores two additional eusepta can appear. The terminal lumina are smaller and protrude toward the spore ends; no perispore or wall ornamentation was observed, and pycnidia were not seen.

== Habitat and distribution ==
The species was found on low, sheltered limestone outcrops within primary coastal forest at Walsingham Nature Reserve, an area that retains Bermuda's native woodland. It occurs with other calcicolous crustose lichen and liverworts; associates reported from the type site include Ionaspis tropica, Stromatella bermudana, Strigula bermudana, Gyalecta farlowii, Cryptothecia striata, and several small gelatinous and cyanolichens. As of its original publication, L. bermudense was known to occur only from the type collection and is endemic to Bermuda; the authors suggest that given that tropical limestone outcrops are patchy and the species is inconspicuous and easily overlooked, its apparent rarity may reflect both a genuinely narrow range and under-collection.
