= Coenogonium kalbii =

Scientific classification
- Kingdom: Fungi
- Division: Ascomycota
- Class: Lecanoromycetes
- Order: Gyalectales
- Family: Coenogoniaceae
- Genus: Coenogonium
- Species: C. kalbii

Binomial name
- Coenogonium kalbii Aptroot, Lücking & L.Umaña (2006)

Species of lichen

Coenogonium kalbii is a species of corticolous (bark-dwelling), crustose lichen in the family Coenogoniaceae. It has been found in variety of locations in the southern region of Costa Rica, primarily in humid, shaded microsites within low-mountain rainforest environments.

== Taxonomy ==
Coenogonium kalbii was first described by lichenologists André Aptroot, Robert Lücking, and Loengrin Alfonso Umaña-Tenorio. The holotype of the species was found in Río Brujo proviknce (Puntarenas), at an altitude of 350 m (1,150 ft). It differs from its relative, Coenogonium geralense, through its pale orange apothecia and narrower conidia. It belongs to a challenging taxonomic species complex that centres around Coenogonium geralense, a group which includes species with medium to large apothecia, smaller and narrower ascospores arranged in a biseriate fashion, and minute conidia. The species epithet honours German lichenologist Klaus Kalb, one of the collectors of the holotype specimen.

== Description ==
Coenogonium kalbii features a crustose thallus that is corticolous, continuous, thin and smooth, with a yellowish-green colouration, and ranges in diameter from 10–30 mm (0.4–1.2 in). It exhibits a cartilaginous corticiform layer and is without a prothallus. The photobiont of the species is the green algal genus Trentepohlia, with cells that are angular to rounded, and grouped in irregular plates or short threads. The apothecia of Coenogonium kalbii are sessile, rounded to slightly irregular in outline, with a pale orange disc. The species has a colourless to pale yellowish hypothecium, and a hymenium that is colourless with a unique reaction to iodine: first turning blue, then quickly to a sordid green and then reddish-brown. Ascospores are narrowly ellipsoid and contain a single septum, with dimensions of 6–8 by 2–2.5 μm.

== Similar species ==
Coenogonium kalbii is part of a complex group of species which primarily differ through their apothecial colours and other minor characteristics. Species like C. geralense and C. queenslandicum exhibit pale to bright yellow discs without any orange tinge. Similarly, C. siquirrense displays bright orange apothecia, while C. subdentatum shows pale yellow-brown apothecia with a denticulate margin. Coenogonium kalbii is most closely similar to C. subfallaciosum but is distinguished by the smaller conidia and its apothecia frequently found marginally hypophyllous on a mycelium free of algae.

== Habitat and distribution ==
This lichen species is primarily found in the southern regions of Costa Rica, preferring humid, shaded microsites within low-mountain rainforest environments. It has been discovered near the Restaurant Río Brujo in Puntarenas, in the vicinity of the Las Cruces Tropical Botanical Garden, Fila Cruces Ridge, and also at the Tapantí National Park in Cartago, among other locations.
