= Coenogonium lueckingii =

Scientific classification
- Kingdom: Fungi
- Division: Ascomycota
- Class: Lecanoromycetes
- Order: Gyalectales
- Family: Coenogoniaceae
- Genus: Coenogonium
- Species: C. lueckingii

Binomial name
- Coenogonium lueckingii Y.Joshi, Gagarina, J.P.Halda & Hur (2015)

Species of lichen

Coenogonium lueckingii is a species of corticolous (bark-dwelling), crustose lichen in the family Coenogoniaceae. It is known to occur in a couple of locations in South Korea, where it grows on the bark of trees in humid locations.

== Taxonomy ==
The lichen was formally described as a new species in 2015 by Yogesh Joshi, Liudmila Gagarina, Joseph Halda, and Jae-Sun Hur. The type specimen was collected from Wonang Falls in Donnaeko valley (Seogwipo, Jeju Province) at an altitude of 330 m (1,080 ft). The species epithet honours lichenologist Robert Lücking, "for his enormous contributions to the field of lichenology".

== Description ==
The lichen has a smooth, greenish-grey to pale grey thallus surrounded by a white prothallus. Its apothecia are between 0.4 and 0.9 mm in diameter, and have a disc that is pale yellowish-orange to deep orange, encircled by a cream-coloured margin. The ascospores, which number 8 per ascus, are ellipsoid to fusiform (spindle-shaped), colourless, and measure 7.5–10 μm long by 2–2.5 μm wide; they have a single septum. The photobiont partner, which is from the green algal genus Trentepohlia, measures 5–10 μm in diameter and is grouped in irregular plates or short threads in the algal layer.

Coenogonium lueckingii does not react to any of the standard chemical spot tests used to test for the presence of lichen products, and no substances were detected when the lichen was analysed using thin-layer chromatography.

== Habitat and distribution ==
The lichen has only been recorded from Jogyesan and the Chuja Islands; in both locations it grows on the bark of trees in humid locations.
