= Pyrenula lilacina =

Scientific classification
- Kingdom: Fungi
- Division: Ascomycota
- Class: Eurotiomycetes
- Order: Pyrenulales
- Family: Pyrenulaceae
- Genus: Pyrenula
- Species: P. lilacina

Binomial name
- Pyrenula lilacina C.O.Mendonça, Aptroot & M.Cáceres (2016)
- Type locality: Povoado Ouro Verde, Bahia, Brazil

Species of lichen-forming fungus

Pyrenula lilacina is a crustose (crust-forming), bark-dwelling lichen in the family Pyrenulaceae. It was described as new in 2016 from specimens collected in the Chapada Diamantina region of Bahia, Brazil.

It forms a thin, lilac thallus that is somewhat shiny, lacks pseudocyphellae (tiny pores in the surface), and has no visible border zone (prothallus). The algal partner (photobiont) is a trentepohlioid green alga. Its fruiting bodies (perithecia) are partly sunken in the thallus (erumpent), nearly spherical, and 0.3–0.5 mm across, with pale-brown, apical pore-like openings (ostioles). The sterile tissue inside (hamathecium) is not filled with oil droplets (not inspersed). The asci contain eight ascospores arranged in two rows. The brown spores are divided into 4 cells by 3 septa and measure 31–37 × 11–14 μm. They are distoseptate, with diamond-shaped internal spaces (lumina), and lack a gelatinous sheath or surface ornamentation. Pycnidia (asexual fruiting bodies) were not observed. The thallus gives a reddish reaction with potassium hydroxide solution (the K spot test), is UV−, and thin-layer chromatography detected an unidentified anthraquinone with a low Rf value.

The species is known from primary forest, where it grows on smooth bark of trees and branches. The type locality is near Povoado Ouro Verde–Catolé at about 1,636 m (5,367 ft) elevation, and it has been collected growing alongside Pyrenula diamantinensis. As of 2025, it had not been reported from any other Brazilian states. In the original description, the authors remarked that the lilac colour is highly unusual among lichens and suggested that the pigment is distinctive, based on chromatographic comparison with a superficially similar pigment reported in Lithothelium.

== See also ==
- List of Pyrenula species
