= Coenogonium australiense =

Scientific classification
- Kingdom: Fungi
- Division: Ascomycota
- Class: Lecanoromycetes
- Order: Gyalectales
- Family: Coenogoniaceae
- Genus: Coenogonium
- Species: C. australiense

Binomial name
- Coenogonium australiense Kantvilas & Lücking (2018)

Species of lichen

Coenogonium australiense is a species of corticolous (bark-dwelling), crustose lichen in the family Coenogoniaceae. Found in Australia, it was formally described as a new species in 2018 by lichenologists Gintaras Kantvilas and Robert Lücking. The type specimen was collected by the first author near Little Fisher River (Tasmania) at an altitude of 880 m (2,890 ft), where it was found in a rainforest growing on Nothofagus cunninghamii. The species epithet australiense refers to its geographical distribution. In addition to Tasmania, the lichen has also been documented from New South Wales and Kangaroo Island. In the latter location it was found in remnant stands of coniferous woodland, where it was growing on the bark of old, fissured Callitris trunks.

== Description ==
The thallus of Coenogonium australiense is crustose and varies in thickness, forming irregular patches on substrates. The photobiont cells are somewhat spherical to ellipsoid in shape and can be found as single cells or short chains. The apothecia, or fruiting bodies, are sessile and have an orange-pink disc with a cream-colored or translucent margin. The excipulum is colorless and 60–120 μm thick, while the hypothecium is 40–80 μm thick and colorless or pale yellowish-brown. The hymenium is 60–80 μm thick and contains asci and paraphyses. Ascospores are typically uniseriate and arranged obliquely in the ascus, measuring 10–14 by 3–4.5 μm. Pycnidia are visible on the upper thallus surface as tiny pale swellings; the conidia are ellipsoid and measure 3–5 by 1–3 μm.
