= Lithothelium immersum =

Scientific classification
- Kingdom: Fungi
- Division: Ascomycota
- Class: Eurotiomycetes
- Order: Pyrenulales
- Family: Pyrenulaceae
- Genus: Lithothelium
- Species: L. immersum

Binomial name
- Lithothelium immersum Aptroot & M.Cáceres (2015)

Species of lichen

Lithothelium immersum is a species of lichen in the family Pyrenulaceae. This bark-dwelling lichen was scientifically described in 2015 from specimens collected in the Amazon rainforest of Brazil. It has tiny, flask-shaped fruiting bodies that are completely buried beneath the thallus and often fused together in small groups. The species grows on smooth tree bark in lowland tropical rainforests and is known only from the Brazilian Amazon region.

== Taxonomy ==
Lithothelium immersum was described as new to science by André Aptroot and Marcela Cáceres in a molecular study of the family Pyrenulaceae. The holotype was collected by the authors from lowland primary rainforest on the Rondônia/Amazonas border of Brazil. In the study's multigene phylogeny, L. immersum falls in the strongly supported "Group 2" of Pyrenulaceae, clustering with species of Pyrenula and Pyrgillus; the authors also noted that Lithothelium as then circumscribed was not monophyletic, with species occurring in both of their main clades and nested within Pyrenula. They did not propose generic changes pending broader sampling.

== Description ==
Lithothelium immersum has a thin, brown thallus without pseudocyphellae (small surface pores). The spore-producing fruiting bodies are perithecioid (tiny, flask-shaped structures) and in this species are fully immersed in the bark beneath the thallus. They are pyriform, 0.3–0.5 mm across, and commonly occur in laterally fused groups of 1–5 that share their walls; the minute pore (ostiole) is lateral, black, and often encircled by a pale roughly 0.1 mm halo visible with a hand lens. The internal sterile tissue (hamathecium) lacks oil droplets. Asci contain eight dark brown ascospores that are 3-septate, 22–26 × 6.5–8.5 μm, with slightly rounded lumina that are wider than long; each spore is surrounded by a 1 μm gelatinous sheath. No pycnidia were observed, and standard spot tests detected no secondary metabolites. The combination of fully immersed, laterally fused perithecia and brown, 3-septate spores distinguishes L. immersum from other Lithothelium species.

== Habitat and distribution ==
A corticolous lichen, Lithothelium immersum occurs on smooth bark in lowland tropical rainforest and is so far confirmed from the Brazilian states of Rondônia and Amazonas.
