= Coenogonium beaverae =

Scientific classification
- Kingdom: Fungi
- Division: Ascomycota
- Class: Lecanoromycetes
- Order: Gyalectales
- Family: Coenogoniaceae
- Genus: Coenogonium
- Species: C. beaverae

Binomial name
- Coenogonium beaverae Lücking & Diederich (2017)

Species of lichen

Coenogonium beaverae is a species of corticolous (bark-dwelling), crustose lichen in the family Coenogoniaceae. Found in Seychelles, it was formally described as a new species in 2017 by Robert Lücking and Paul Diederich. The type specimen was collected by the second author in a disturbed rainforest near the Sauzier Waterfall (Port Glaud, Mahé) at altitudes between 20 and 70 m (66 and 230 ft). It is only known from the type locality. The species epithet beaverae honours Katy Beaver, "who generously gave support and assistance during the field trip of the first author to several Seychelles islands, and who is extremely active in the protection of the environment in Seychelles".

Characteristics of Coenogonium beaverae are its crustose thallus, its broad, small ascospores measuring 6–8 by 2.5–3.5 μm, and medium-sized, pale orange to cream-coloured apothecia that are 0.5–0.8 mm in diameter.
