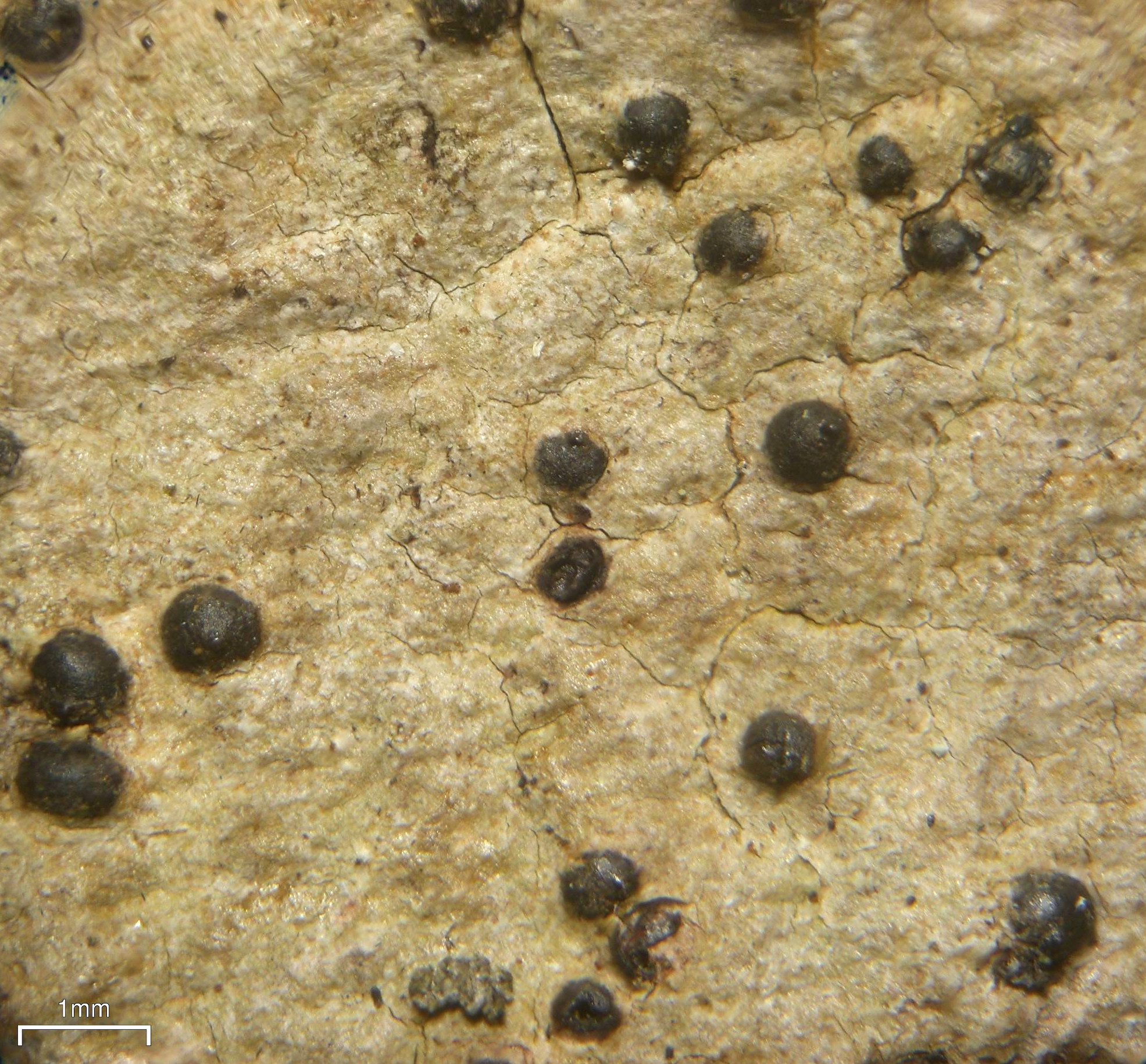
- Lithothelium hyalosporum; scale bar = 0.5 mm

Scientific classification
- Domain: Eukaryota
- Kingdom: Fungi
- Division: Ascomycota
- Class: Eurotiomycetes
- Order: Pyrenulales
- Family: Pyrenulaceae
- Genus: Lithothelium; Müll.Arg. (1885)

Type species
- Lithothelium cubanum Müll.Arg. (1885)

Synonyms
- Plagiocarpa R.C.Harris (1973); Pleurotrema Müll.Arg. (1885); Pleurotrematomyces Cif. & Tomas. (1957); Trichotrema Clem. (1909)

= Lithothelium =

Genus of lichen-forming fungi

Lithothelium is a genus of lichen-forming fungi in the family Pyrenulaceae. Most of the species are found in tropical climates, and are usually corticolous (bark-dwelling) or saxicolous (rock-dwelling). These lichens form thin, crust-like layers that are often embedded within their substrate and are characterized by distinctive black, flask-shaped reproductive structures that may occur individually or in fused clusters with small openings for spore release. Established as a genus in 1885 by the Swiss botanist Johannes Müller Argoviensis, Lithothelium species can be distinguished from similar lichens by their rounded spore compartments and the presence of specialized structures called ocular chambers that assist in spore discharge.

== Taxonomy ==
The genus was circumscribed by the Swiss botanist Johannes Müller Argoviensis in 1885, with L. cubanum as the type species. Müller distinguished Lithothelium from related genera by its crustose, often inconspicuous thallus and distinctive fruiting bodies (apothecia) that are immersed in the substrate in clustered arrangements, with convergent openings arranged in a collar-like formation. He noted that the genus was similar in composition to Sagedia, characterized by plurilocular spermogonia and hyaline, transversely divided spores arranged in bead-like chains within the asci. The type species L. cubanum was described from specimens collected on calcareous rock in Cuba, featuring a very thin thallus and distinctive black, clustered perithecia with multiple ostioles.

== Description ==
Lithothelium is a genus of crustose lichens, meaning its thallus—the main body of the lichen—forms a thin, crust-like layer that can either remain embedded within the substrate or lie on its surface. Some species have a green algal partner from the genus Trentepohlia, while others may lack a photobiont altogether.

The reproductive structures, called perithecia, are flask-shaped fruiting bodies that are typically black and can occur either individually or in fused clusters. These have an ostiole—a small opening through which spores are released—that is usually located at the top but may also be offset to the side. Inside the perithecia, the fertile tissue (the hamathecium) consists of slender, unbranched or slightly branched filaments called paraphyses. These lack periphyses, which are short hairs found in some other lichenised fungi. The gel that surrounds the hymenium (spore-producing layer) may show weak blue or orange staining in iodine-based staining, although the ascus wall itself does not react (K/I–). The asci usually contain 6 to 8 spores and typically have a rounded or three-lobed (sagittiform) ocular chamber, a small structure near the apex that assists in spore discharge.

The ascospores may be colourless or brown, with three to seven cross-walls (septa) or occasionally with a more complex somewhat muriform (brick-like) structure. All septa are distoseptate—meaning the cross-walls are thickened and distinct—and the individual spore compartments (cell lumina) tend to be rounded in shape. Asexual reproduction occurs through pycnidia, small specialised structures that produce long, threadlike (filiform), non-septate conidia. No secondary metabolites (lichen products) have been detected in this genus using thin-layer chromatography.

== Ecology ==
Species of Lithothelium are found growing either on tree bark or on rock surfaces. They resemble those in the genus Pyrenula, but can generally be distinguished by the presence of an ocular chamber in the asci and the more rounded appearance of their spore cells.

== Species ==
- Lithothelium austropacificum P.M.McCarthy (1996) – Lord Howe Island
- Lithothelium bermudense F.Berger, LaGreca & Aptroot (2016) – Bermuda
- Lithothelium cubanum Müll.Arg. (1885)
- Lithothelium echinatum Aptroot (2006) – China
- Lithothelium filisporum (Patw., Makhija & D.Rane) Kr.P.Singh & G.P.Sinha (2010)
- Lithothelium fluorescens Aptroot & Sipman (2008)
- Lithothelium fugax (Müll.Arg.) Aptroot (2006)
- Lithothelium grossum Aptroot (2006) – China
- Lithothelium hieroglyphicum Aptroot (2007) – Australia
- Lithothelium hyalosporum (Nyl.) Aptroot (1991)
- Lithothelium illotum (Vain.) Aptroot (1991)
- Lithothelium immersum Aptroot & M.Cáceres (2015)
- Lithothelium insulare Makhija & Adaw. (2001) – India
- Lithothelium kantvilasii P.M.McCarthy (2015) – Australia
- Lithothelium kiritea A.J.Marshall, Aptroot, de Lange & Blanchon (2024) – New Zealand
- Lithothelium obtectum (Müll.Arg.) Aptroot (1991)
- Lithothelium phaeosporum (R.C.Harris) Aptroot (1991)
- Lithothelium quadrisporum Aptroot (2006) – Thailand
- Lithothelium quiescens P.M.McCarthy (2001) – Christmas Island
