= Coenogonium subsquamosum =

Scientific classification
- Kingdom: Fungi
- Division: Ascomycota
- Class: Lecanoromycetes
- Order: Gyalectales
- Family: Coenogoniaceae
- Genus: Coenogonium
- Species: C. subsquamosum

Binomial name
- Coenogonium subsquamosum (Aptroot & Seaward) Lücking, Aptroot & Sipman (2006)

Synonyms
- Dimerella subsquamosa Aptroot & Seaward (2004)

Species of lichen

Coenogonium subsquamosum is a species of corticolous (bark-dwelling) crustose lichen in the family Coenogoniaceae. The lichen forms a distinctive straw-yellow crust with a cracked to somewhat scaly texture, bearing deep yellow apothecia (reproductive discs) that are slightly darker than the thallus. It is known only from Silhouette Island in the Seychelles, where it grows on tree bark in coastal environments near the high-tide mark.

== Taxonomy ==
Coenogonium subsquamosum was described in 2004 by André Aptroot and Mark Seaward as one of four new Seychellois lichens they discovered during a survey of Silhouette Island. They initially classified the species in the genus Dimerella. The holotype specimen (hb. Seaward 112497) was collected on 29 July 2000 from the bark of a coastal Calophyllum at La Passe, Silhouette Island. The species had previously appeared in a checklist of Silhouette lichens as "Dimerella sp. 1", but comparison with others in its genus revealed a unique combination of a yellow thallus and biseriate, narrowly ellipsoid ascospores, warranting formal recognition. The epithet subsquamosa (Latin "somewhat scaly") refers to the cracked-areolate to almost squamulose texture of the thallus. The taxon was transferred to the genus Coenogonium in 2006.

== Description ==
The lichen forms a dull, moderately thick crust that is smooth to cracked-areolate, occasionally verging on somewhat squamulose (scaly). Thallus colour is a clear straw-yellow, slightly paler than the apothecia, and individual areoles measure about 0.1 mm across and 50 μm high; a thin white hypothallus may be present at the margins. No secondary metabolites were detected by spot-tests or thin-layer chromatography, and pycnidia have not been observed.

Apothecia are regularly scattered, orbicular and biatorine, 0.7–1.1 mm in diameter, with a deep yellow disc that starts flat and becomes gently convex; the margin remains slightly paler and conspicuous. Each apothecium is urn-shaped, its base narrowing where it meets the thallus but lacking a true stalk. The hyaline hymenium is 70–90 μm tall and becomes blue in iodine after pretreatment with potassium hydroxide solution; near its base it contains a sparse deposit of pale-yellow granules. The excipulum and hypothecium are hyaline but strongly infilled with yellow pigments; their cells (4–8 μm wide) are arranged in neat radial rows that sometimes elongate outward. Paraphyses are mostly simple, 1.5 μm thick, with one to three inflated apical cells that broaden to 4 μm. Asci contain eight narrowly ellipsoid spores organised in two lengthwise rows; spores measure 12–15.5 × 3–3.5 μm and are uniformly one-septate.

== Habitat and distribution ==
All known material comes from the granitic Silhouette Island in the Seychelles. The holotype grew on the bark of a mature Calophyllum tree a few metres above the high-tide mark at La Passe. The species is corticolous (bark-dwelling) and apparently restricted to shaded but aerated microhabitats in the coastal strand, where salt spray, high humidity and steady trade-wind airflow create a relatively stable microclimate. No saxicolous, foliicolous or inland occurrences have been reported.
