= Lithothelium austropacificum =

Scientific classification
- Kingdom: Fungi
- Division: Ascomycota
- Class: Eurotiomycetes
- Order: Pyrenulales
- Family: Pyrenulaceae
- Genus: Lithothelium
- Species: L. austropacificum

Binomial name
- Lithothelium austropacificum P.M.McCarthy (1996)
- Holotype: Mount Lidgbird, Lord Howe Island, Australia

Species of lichen

Lithothelium austropacificum is a species of saxicolous (rock-dwelling) crustose lichen in the family Pyrenulaceae. It is endemic to Lord Howe Island, Australia, where it grows on shaded basalt rocks in coastal boulder scree stabilised by large fig trees. The species is distinguished by its prominent grey-green to yellow-green crust and numerous small, black, flask-shaped fruiting bodies that contain brown spores with thickened internal partitions.

== Taxonomy ==
Lithothelium austropacificum was described as new to science by Patrick McCarthy in 1996 from collections made on Lord Howe Island, Australia. The holotype was collected on 8 February 1995 on shaded basalt on the lower slopes of Mount Lidgbird, between Little Island and "The Cross" at about 50 m elevation (collector: P.M. McCarthy 1066; holotype in CANB). The genus Lithothelium has often been characterised by an arrowhead-shaped (sagittiform) ocular chamber at the tip of the ascus, though that feature can be weak or variable.

== Description ==
The thallus forms a thin crust closely attached to the rock (crustose and epilithic), grey-green to yellow-green, and cracked into small irregular plates (rimose to areolate). It is typically 30–60 micrometres (μm) thick (occasionally to 100 μm), lacks a true outer skin (ecorticate), and contains the green alga Trentepohlia as its photosynthetic partner (photobiont). No dark boundary line (prothallus) is apparent. Routine chemical spot tests were negative (K−), and the thallus is UV− under ultraviolet light.

The sexual fruiting bodies are perithecioid—minute, black, flask-like domes with a pore (ostiole)—very numerous, and set one-third immersed to superficial on the thallus. They are usually 0.8–1.7 mm across and may contain one or two internal chambers that share a common ostiole. The wall is thick (to about 260 μm), dark and partly carbonised, often with tiny rock grains embedded; the pore can be inconspicuous or deeply cup-like. Inside, the asci are long and cylindrical, eight-spored, and sometimes show a weakly sagittiform apical chamber. The ascospores are brown, ellipsoid to short-fusiform, divided by three distosepta (thickened internal partitions; not true eusepta), and typically measure roughly 22.5 × 11 μm. Asexual structures (conidiomata) are also common; they produce slender, slightly to strongly curved conidia about 10–20 × 0.5–0.8 μm.

Lithothelium austropacificum differs from other rock-dwelling members of its genus by its combination of a prominent, epilithic thallus, large perithecia, and comparatively large, brown, 3-distoseptate ascospores. It is one of only two saxicolous Lithothelium species with this spore type; it can be separated from the New Zealand, limestone-dwelling L. australe by the Lord Howe species' basalt habitat and its larger perithecia, spores and conidia. Lithothelium bermudense from Bermuda is a close look-alike: both species have brown, 3-distoseptate spores with diamond-shaped lumina, but L. bermudense grows within calcareous rock (endolithic) and lacks a visible thallus, and its spores develop true internal cross-walls (eusepta). In contrast, L. austropacificum forms a conspicuous surface thallus on basalt and lacks eusepta.

== Habitat and distribution ==
The species is known to occur only on Lord Howe Island. At the type locality it is abundant on shaded basalt within boulder scree above the seashore below the steep western face of Mount Lidgbird (777 m). The scree is stabilised by very large, buttressed Ficus trees and a mix of smaller trees and shrubs. Associated lichens recorded at the site include Lecanora melacarpella, Parmotrema tinctorum, several Pertusaria species (e.g. P. howeana, P. lavata, P. montpittensis), Porina aff. ocellata, Pseudocyphellaria poculifera, Rimelia reticulata, Strigula australiensis, and several Verrucaria species.
