= Coenogonium barbatum =

Scientific classification
- Kingdom: Fungi
- Division: Ascomycota
- Class: Lecanoromycetes
- Order: Gyalectales
- Family: Coenogoniaceae
- Genus: Coenogonium
- Species: C. barbatum

Binomial name
- Coenogonium barbatum Lücking, Aptroot & L.Umaña (2006)

Species of lichen

Coenogonium barbatum is a species of foliicolous (leaf-dwelling) lichen in the family Coenogoniaceae. It is characterised by its distinctive beard-shaped growth, setting it apart from closely related species. Identified and named as a new species in 2006, the lichen has been specifically found at the La Selva Biological Station in Costa Rica. The species name barbatum hints at its beard-like appearance.

== Description ==
Coenogonium barbatum has filamentous thallus, extending horizontally from the substrate, specifically leaves, in a manner reminiscent of a beard. This structure is composed of several tufts of filaments connected at the base, with a yellowish-green colour and measuring up to 10 mm (0.4 in) in both length and breadth. The photobiont or the algal component of the lichen, belongs to the green algal genus Trentepohlia. The algal cells are cylindrical, arranged in clear filaments and are larger than those found in other species in the genus. The apothecia, the sexual reproductive structures of the lichen, are rounded and semi-stalked with pale yellow to yellow-orange discs. No substances were detected in the species following a thin-layer chromatography analysis.

Despite its resemblance to the semi-circular thalli-producing species C. linkii and C. congense, C. barbatum is differentiated by its unique growth form and wider algal cells.

== Habitat and distribution ==
The habitat of C. barbatum is the understory of lowland rainforests where it grows on leaves. According to the authors, its specific location and its distinctive beard-shaped structure suggest the involvement of a unique mycobiont and photobiont in this species. A similar yet distinct taxon, referred to as C. aff. barbatum, has also been observed at the same locality, albeit with a different growth form and narrower photobiont cells, further emphasising the distinctive characteristics of C. barbatum.
