= Lithothelium fluorescens =

Scientific classification
- Kingdom: Fungi
- Division: Ascomycota
- Class: Eurotiomycetes
- Order: Pyrenulales
- Family: Pyrenulaceae
- Genus: Lithothelium
- Species: L. fluorescens

Binomial name
- Lithothelium fluorescens Aptroot & Sipman (2008)

Species of lichen-forming fungus

Lithothelium fluorescens is a species of corticolous (bark-dwelling), crustose lichen in the family Pyrenulaceae. It is known from montane rainforest sites in Puntarenas Province, Costa Rica, where it was collected on bark on the lower trunk. The lichen is identified mainly by microscopic characters in its flask-shaped fruiting bodies (perithecia) and ascospores, rather than by any obvious surface features. The thallus is ochraceous and has a cortex, and the perithecia are mostly immersed but show as small, hemispherical warts. In standard lichen spot tests, the thallus fluoresces yellow under ultraviolet light, and it contains the lichen substance lichexanthone.

== Taxonomy ==
It was described as a new species in 2008 by the lichenologists André Aptroot and Harrie Sipman, based on material collected in La Amistad International Park in Puntarenas Province, Costa Rica.

== Description ==
The lichen forms an ochraceous (yellowish-brown) corticate thallus (the main lichen body). Its perithecia (flask-shaped fruiting bodies) are solitary and mostly embedded in the thallus, but become visible as small, hemispherical warts. Individual perithecia are roughly 0.3–0.8 mm across and 0.2–0.4 mm high, and each has a tiny black ostiole (opening) that may be edged by a small grey to brown ring that sometimes protrudes from the surface (an annulus).

Microscopically, the tissue between the asci (the hamathecium) is clear rather than oil-filled and does not react with iodine (IKI–). The asci have a rounded ocular chamber and measure about 90–100 × 10–12 μm. Each ascus contains eight red-brown ascospores with three internal septa that are distoseptate (the septa form separate internal chambers), measuring about 13–17 × 7–8.5 μm. The spore compartments (lumina) are rounded in mature spores but can be angular in immature spores. The end compartments are smaller than the central ones, and the inner spore wall (endospore) is about 1–3 μm thick. Conidiomata (asexual structures) have not been observed. In lichen spot tests, the thallus is UV+ (yellow) and does not react with potassium hydroxide (K–), consistent with the presence of lichexanthone.

== Habitat and distribution ==
In the type locality, the species was found on bark on the lower trunk in a montane rainforest zone at about 1,800 m (5,900 ft), in an abandoned pasture with remnants of forest. The original description treated it as the first Lithothelium known to contain lichexanthone, and placed it in that genus rather than Pyrenula because its ascospores are red-brown and the lumina become rounded at maturity. It can be confused with Pyrenula dermatodes, which differs mainly in having ascospore lumina that remain angular when mature. Additional material was reported from the same province at about 1,600 m (5,200 ft), where it was collected in disturbed primary forest, again on bark on the lower trunk.
