= Coenogonium minidenticulatum =

Scientific classification
- Kingdom: Fungi
- Division: Ascomycota
- Class: Lecanoromycetes
- Order: Gyalectales
- Family: Coenogoniaceae
- Genus: Coenogonium
- Species: C. minidenticulatum

Binomial name
- Coenogonium minidenticulatum Aptroot & M.Cáceres (2016)
- Holotype: Plantio da ANCEL, Brazil

Species of lichen

Coenogonium minidenticulatum is a species of corticolous (bark-dwelling) crustose lichen in the family Coenogoniaceae. This lichen, discovered growing on tree bark in a forest remnant near Macapá in the Brazilian Amazon, was described as a new species in 2016. It is characterized by its very small, round fruiting bodies that have distinctively fine-toothed edges and contain unusually narrow ascospores.

== Taxonomy ==
Coenogonium minidenticulatum was described as new to science in 2016 by André Aptroot and Marcela da Silva Cáceres from material collected in Amapá, northern Brazil. The holotype was gathered near Macapá (Plantio da ANCEL, near Curicaca) on tree bark in a tall forest remnant at about 30 m elevation. The specific epithet refers to the minute, finely toothed (denticulate) margins of the apothecia.

The authors emphasized that the species is set apart within Coenogonium by its small, distinctly denticulate apothecia and especially slender, single septum spores; among similar species, C. chloroticum has darker, non-denticulate apothecia and conspicuously broader spores (over 2.0 μm wide).

== Description ==
The thallus is thin, smooth, somewhat shiny, and olive green, with a distinct cortex and no obvious prothallus. Apothecia are sessile, round, and very small (0.2–0.4 mm in diameter); the disk is flat, dull, and pale chamois colored, while the paler margin is clearly raised and usually denticulate. The hymenium is hyaline and measures 45–65 μm high). The paraphyses are indistinctly septate near their slightly club-shaped (clavate) tips; the epithecium is hyaline and gelatinous; the hypothecium and excipulum are also hyaline. Each ascus contains eight ascospores that are hyaline, long-ellipsoid, and 1-septate, measuring 6–7 × 1.0–1.5 μm; no pycnidia were observed. Standard spot tests on the thallus were negative (UV−, C−, P−, K−); thin-layer chromatography was not performed for this material.

== Habitat and distribution ==
The species grows on tree bark in remnant tall forest within the eastern Amazon. It is known only from Brazil (Amapá).
