= Lithothelium quadrisporum =

Scientific classification
- Kingdom: Fungi
- Division: Ascomycota
- Class: Eurotiomycetes
- Order: Pyrenulales
- Family: Pyrenulaceae
- Genus: Lithothelium
- Species: L. quadrisporum

Binomial name
- Lithothelium quadrisporum Aptroot (2006)

Species of lichen

Lithothelium quadrisporum is a species of corticolous (bark-dwelling) lichen in the family Pyrenulaceae. Found in Thailand, it was formally described as a new species in 2006 by Dutch lichenologist André Aptroot. The type specimen was collected on the Doi Chiang Dao mountain (Chiang Mai Province) at an altitude of 1,600 m (5,200 ft). Here, in a sheltered secondary rainforest, the thin pale green to brownish thallus of the lichen was found growing on the bark of a tree trunk. The specific name refers to the asci, which are the only consistently four-spored asci in genus Lithothelium.
