= Lithothelium grossum =

Scientific classification
- Domain: Eukaryota
- Kingdom: Fungi
- Division: Ascomycota
- Class: Eurotiomycetes
- Order: Pyrenulales
- Family: Pyrenulaceae
- Genus: Lithothelium
- Species: L. grossum

Binomial name
- Lithothelium grossum Aptroot (2006)

Species of lichen

Lithothelium grossum is a species of corticolous (bark-dwelling) lichen in the family Pyrenulaceae. Found in China, it was formally described as a new species in 2006 by Dutch lichenologist André Aptroot. The type specimen was collected in the Xishuangbanna Tropical Botanical Garden (Mengla County, Yunnan) at an altitude of 550 m (1,800 ft); here it was found growing on a tree trunk. Lithothelium grossum is characterized by its large hyaline (translucent) ascospores, which measure 27–37 by 12–17 μm; these are the largest of hyaline-spored species in genus Lithothelium.
