= Coenogonium urceolatum =

Scientific classification
- Kingdom: Fungi
- Division: Ascomycota
- Class: Lecanoromycetes
- Order: Gyalectales
- Family: Coenogoniaceae
- Genus: Coenogonium
- Species: C. urceolatum

Binomial name
- Coenogonium urceolatum Kantvilas, Rivas Plata & Lücking (2018)

Species of lichen

Coenogonium urceolatum is a rare species of corticlous (bark-dwelling), crustose lichen in the family Coenogoniaceae. Found in western Tasmania, it was formally described as a new species in 2018 by lichenologists Gintaras Kantvilas, Eimy Rivas Plata, and Robert Lücking. The type specimen was collected by the first author near Piney Creek, about 10 kilometres (6.2 miles) north of Zeehan, where it was found in a cool temperate rainforest, growing on an old, dry, shaded trunk of Nothofagus cunninghamii. It is only known from the type collection. The lichen has a pale greyish-greenish thallus (15–30 μm thick) lacking a prothallus. The species epithet refers to its characteristic small, urn-shaped (urceolate), orange apothecia.
