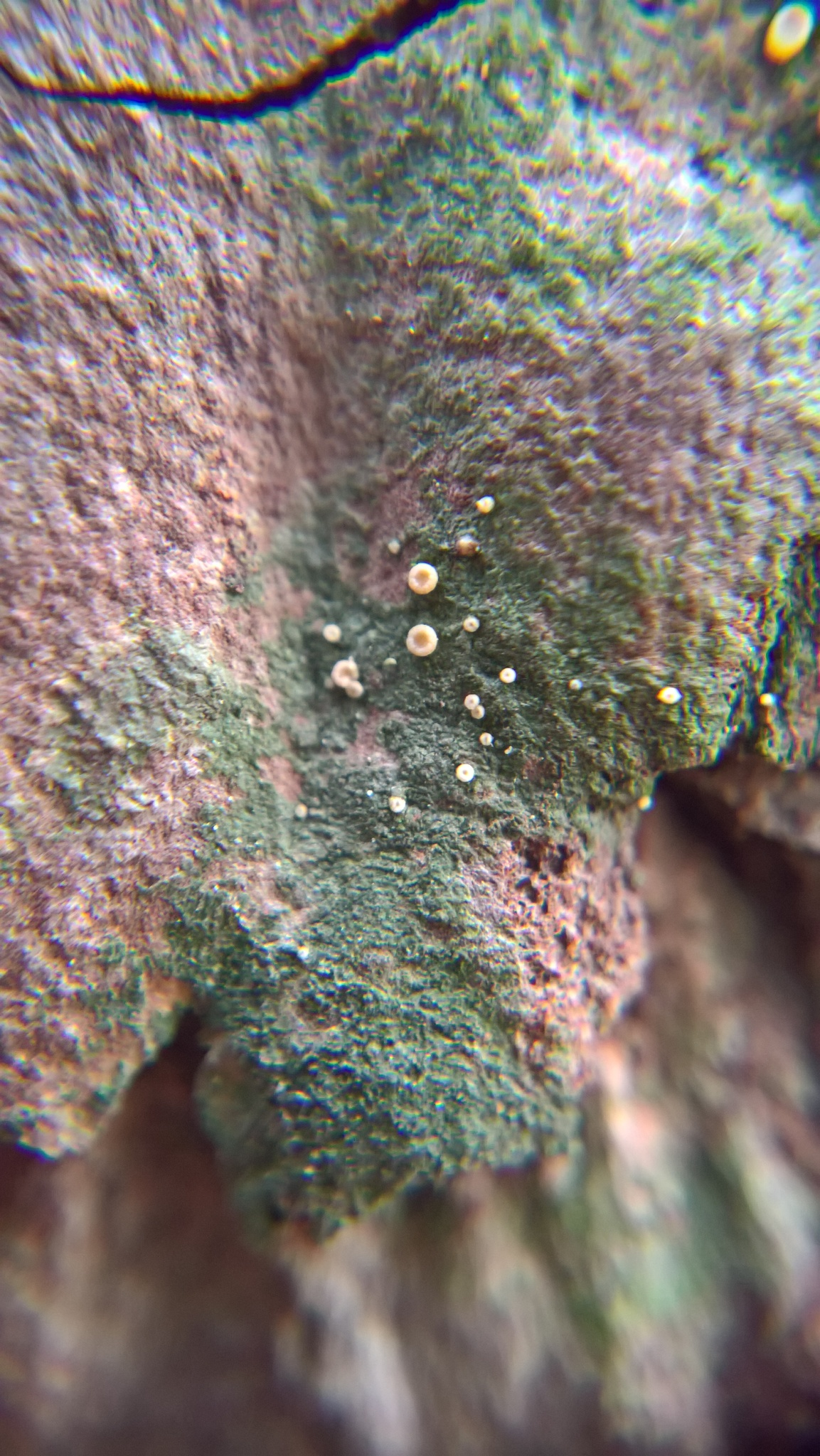

Scientific classification
- Kingdom: Fungi
- Division: Ascomycota
- Class: Lecanoromycetes
- Order: Gyalectales
- Family: Coenogoniaceae
- Genus: Coenogonium
- Species: C. pineti

Binomial name
- Coenogonium pineti (Ach.) Lücking & Lumbsch (2004)

Synonyms
- List: Lecidea pineti Ach. (1810) (basionym); Belonidium piceae (Henn.) Boud. (1907); Belonium piceae Henn. (1904); Biatora pineti (Ach.) Fr. (1822); Biatora vernalis f. pineti (Ach.) Fr. (1831); Biatora vernalis var. pineti (Ach.) Tuck. (1845); Biatorina diluta (Pers.) Th. Fr. (1860); Biatorina pineti (Ach.) A.Massal. (1852); Biatorinopsis diluta (Pers.) Müll.Arg. (1881); Bilimbia pineti (Ach.) Branth & Rostr. (1869); Cistella piceae (Henn.) Dennis (1968); Dimerella diluta (Pers.) Trevis. (1880); Dimerella pineti (Ach.) Vězda (1975); Gyalecta diluta (Pers.) Blomb. & Forssell (1880); Gyalecta pineti (Ach.) Tuck. (1872); Lecidea diluta (Pers.) Leight. (1879); Lecidea vernalis var. pineti (Ach.) Link (1832); Lichen peltatus * pineti (Ach.) Lam. (1813); Lichen pineti Schrad. ex Ach. (1810); Microphiale diluta (Pers.) Zahlbr. (1904); Niptera taxi Rea (1921); Patellaria pineti (Ach.) Spreng. (1827); Peziza diluta Pers. (1801); Secoliga diluta (Pers.) Arnold (1884); Sporoblastia diluta (Pers.) Trevis. (1856)

= Coenogonium pineti =

Species of lichen

Coenogonium pineti is a species of crustose lichen in the family Coenogoniaceae. It was first formally described by Erik Acharius in 1810, as Lecidea pineti. Robert Lücking and H. Thorsten Lumbsch transferred it to Coenogonium in 2004 after molecular phylogenetic analysis suggested its placement in that genus. The lichen has a widespread distribution in cooler, temperate regions of the Northern Hemisphere, but has also been recorded from southeastern mainland Australia and Tasmania.

Although usually found growing on bark, Coenogonium pineti has also been found growing on mosses. Its thallus is smooth, greyish-green to greenish-black in colour, and lacks a prothallus; it measures 5–20 mm (0.2–0.8 in) in diameter. The apothecia are small (0.2–0.5 mm in diameter) and pale with a wide margin. Ascospores are ellipsoid with a single septum, measuring 9–14 by 2.3–4.5 μm.

Some preliminary molecular analysis indicates that there are distinct genetic lineages within the traditional circumscription of Coenogonium pineti, suggesting the presence of cryptic species.
