= Coenogonium stramineum =

Scientific classification
- Kingdom: Fungi
- Division: Ascomycota
- Class: Lecanoromycetes
- Order: Gyalectales
- Family: Coenogoniaceae
- Genus: Coenogonium
- Species: C. stramineum

Binomial name
- Coenogonium stramineum (Aptroot & Seaward) Lücking, Aptroot & Sipman (2006)

Synonyms
- Dimerella straminea Aptroot & Seaward (2004)

Species of lichen

Coenogonium stramineum is a species of corticolous (bark-dwelling) crustose lichen in the family Coenogoniaceae. Originally described as Dimerella straminea in 2004, it was transferred to the genus Coenogonium in 2006. The lichen forms a wafer-thin, grey-white to grey-green crust on tree bark, distinguished by its tiny yellowish apothecia (reproductive discs) that give the species its epithet, which means "straw-coloured" in Latin. It is known only from its type locality on Silhouette Island in the Seychelles, where it grows as an epiphyte in the island's lower-montane evergreen forest.

== Taxonomy ==
Dimerella straminea was formally described as a new species by André Aptroot and Mark Seaward in their 2004 treatment of four previously unnamed Seychellois lichens. The holotype specimen (hb. Seaward 112463) was collected on 26 July 2000 from the bark of a living Tabebuia along the Jardin Marron trail, Silhouette Island, at about 220 metres elevation, and is conserved in the Bradford herbarium (BRAD). The specific epithet—straminea, Latin for "straw-coloured"—echoes the pale yellow hue of the apothecial disc that distinguishes the species.

The taxon was transferred to the genus Coenogonium in 2006.

== Description ==
Coenogonium stramineum forms a wafer-thin, grey-white to grey-green crust that lies flush against the bark, so slender that the underlying wood cells are visible through the lichen surface. Because the thallus lacks both a protective skin (cortex) and any obvious cracking or areoles, it merges imperceptibly with its substrate and appears almost film-like. Its reproductive structures―tiny, slightly glossy discs called apothecia―are dotted over the thallus. Each apothecium is round, only 0.20–0.35 mm across, and shaped rather like a miniature urn: the base narrows where it meets the thallus, while the flat, yellowish disc is rimmed by a paler edge that may be smooth or minutely toothed. No chemical colour reactions were detected in the thallus (all spot tests negative).

Under the microscope the spore-bearing layer (hymenium) is clear and 45–55 micrometres (μm) tall, supported below by an equally colourless tissue (hypothecium) whose cells turn faintly blue when iodine is introduced, a reaction that helps confirm the species' identity. The rim of the apothecium (excipulum) is likewise hyaline and built of small globose cells about 3–4 μm in diameter. Delicate, thread-like paraphyses, only 1.5 μm wide, weave through the hymenium and terminate in swollen tips up to 4 μm across. Each ascus contains two neat rows of narrowly ellipsoid spores (a biseriate arrangement); the ascospores measure 9–11 × 3–3.5 μm, are divided by a single cross-wall typical of the genus, and often show a slight pinch at the septum. Asexual reproductive bodies (pycnidia) have not been observed in this species.

== Habitat and distribution ==
Coenogonium stramineum is known only from its type locality on Silhouette Island in the Seychelles archipelago. The site lies within the island's lower-montane evergreen forest, a humid belt influenced by frequent cloud cover and oceanic trade winds. Within this setting the species grows as a corticolous corticolous (bark-dwelling) epiphyte, occupying the shaded, relatively stable microclimate provided by mature trunks.
