= Pyrenula diamantinensis =

Scientific classification
- Kingdom: Fungi
- Division: Ascomycota
- Class: Eurotiomycetes
- Order: Pyrenulales
- Family: Pyrenulaceae
- Genus: Pyrenula
- Species: P. diamantinensis

Binomial name
- Pyrenula diamantinensis C.O.Mendonça, Aptroot & M.Cáceres (2016)
- Type locality: Povoado Ouro Verde, Bahia, Brazil

Species of lichen-forming fungus

Pyrenula diamantinensis is a crustose (crust-forming), bark-dwelling lichen in the family Pyrenulaceae. It was described as new in 2016 from specimens collected in the Chapada Diamantina region of Bahia, Brazil. The thallus is thin, yellowish brown, and somewhat shiny, with patches of whitish dusting (pruina) and pseudocyphellae (tiny pores in the surface) that are often eroded; it lacks a visible border zone (prothallus). The algal partner (photobiont) is a trentepohlioid green alga.

Its fruiting bodies (perithecia) are partly sunken in the thallus (erumpent), flattened to nearly spherical, and usually 0.3–0.5 mm across, commonly occurring in groups of 2–10 that touch side-by-side but are not completely fused. The pore-like openings (ostioles) are apical and black, and the sterile tissue inside (hamathecium) is not filled with oil droplets (not inspersed). The asci contain eight ascospores in two rows. The brown spores are divided into 4 cells by 3 septa and measure 26–33 × 11–16 μm. They are distoseptate and have mostly obliquely quadrangular internal spaces (lumina), with rounded ends and no gelatinous sheath or ornamentation. Pycnidia (asexual fruiting bodies) were not observed. Chemical spot tests were negative (K−, UV−), and thin-layer chromatography detected no lichen substances.

The species is known from primary forest, where it grows on smooth bark of trees and branches. The type locality is near Povoado Ouro Verde–Catolé at about 1,636 m (5,367 ft) elevation, and it has been collected growing alongside Pyrenula lilacina. As of 2025, it had not been reported from any other Brazilian states.

== See also ==
- List of Pyrenula species
