= Coenogonium coppinsii =

Scientific classification
- Kingdom: Fungi
- Division: Ascomycota
- Class: Lecanoromycetes
- Order: Gyalectales
- Family: Coenogoniaceae
- Genus: Coenogonium
- Species: C. coppinsii

Binomial name
- Coenogonium coppinsii Aptroot & M.Cáceres (2014)
- Holotype: Fazenda São Francisco, Brazil

Species of lichen

Coenogonium coppinsii is a species of lichen in the family Coenogoniaceae. that primarily inhabits the soil of termite nests within Brazilian rainforests. Described in 2014, it is distinctive for its unusual ecological niche and morphological features.

== Taxonomy ==
The species was first described by the lichenologists André Aptroot and Marcela Cáceres in 2014, with the type specimen collected from the Amazonas region of Brazil. The holotype is preserved at the ISE herbarium (Federal University of Sergipe), with isotypes held at ABL (Adviesbureau voor Bryologie en Lichenologie).

Coenogonium coppinsii is unique within its genus, particularly for its habitat on the ground, unlike its congener which are typically found on tree bark or leaves. Its morphological traits, such as the slender, elongated ascospores and small, cup-like (cupuliform) apothecia, set it apart from other Coenogonium species. This species could be confused with Coenogonium lisowskii due to similar habitat and spore characteristics, but it differs significantly in the colour and openness of the apothecia.

== Description ==
The thallus of Coenogonium coppinsii is very thin, smooth, and patchily shiny, having a continuous green appearance without a cortex. It hosts trentepohlioid algae, which are typically 5–10 μm in diameter. The apothecia of this lichen are sessile and cupuliform, ranging from 0.2 to 0.3 mm in diameter, with a slightly to deeply concave structure. The discs are pale fuscous brown, with margins that may appear the same colour or paler, giving the apothecia a waxy appearance.

The hymenium is clear, about 70–85 μm high, with paraphyses that are club-shaped (clavate at the tips. The epithecium is gelatinous and hyaline, while the hypothecium and the inside of the excipulum are also hyaline, with the outer zone of the excipulum appearing fuscous brown, made up of irregular cells. The ascus contains eight irregularly biseriate ascospores, which are elongated ellipsoid, hyaline, 1-septate, and measure 60–95 by 25–30 μm with rounded ends.

No lichen products were detected in the thallus, which shows negative reactions to all standard chemical spot tests (UV−, C−, K−, KC−, P−).

== Habitat and distribution ==
This species is endemic to Brazil, found exclusively on termite nests in primary rainforests. It has been observed both on the ground and on trees.
