= Coenogonium implexum =

Scientific classification
- Kingdom: Fungi
- Division: Ascomycota
- Class: Lecanoromycetes
- Order: Gyalectales
- Family: Coenogoniaceae
- Genus: Coenogonium
- Species: C. implexum

Binomial name
- Coenogonium implexum Nyl. (1862)

Synonyms
- Coenogonium acrocephalum Müll.Arg. (1881); Coenogonium rigidulum Müll.Arg. (1882)

Species of lichen

Coenogonium implexum is a yellow-green byssoid lichen with light orange apothecia found in Australia. It is in the family Coenogoniaceae, and was first described by William Nylander in 1862.
