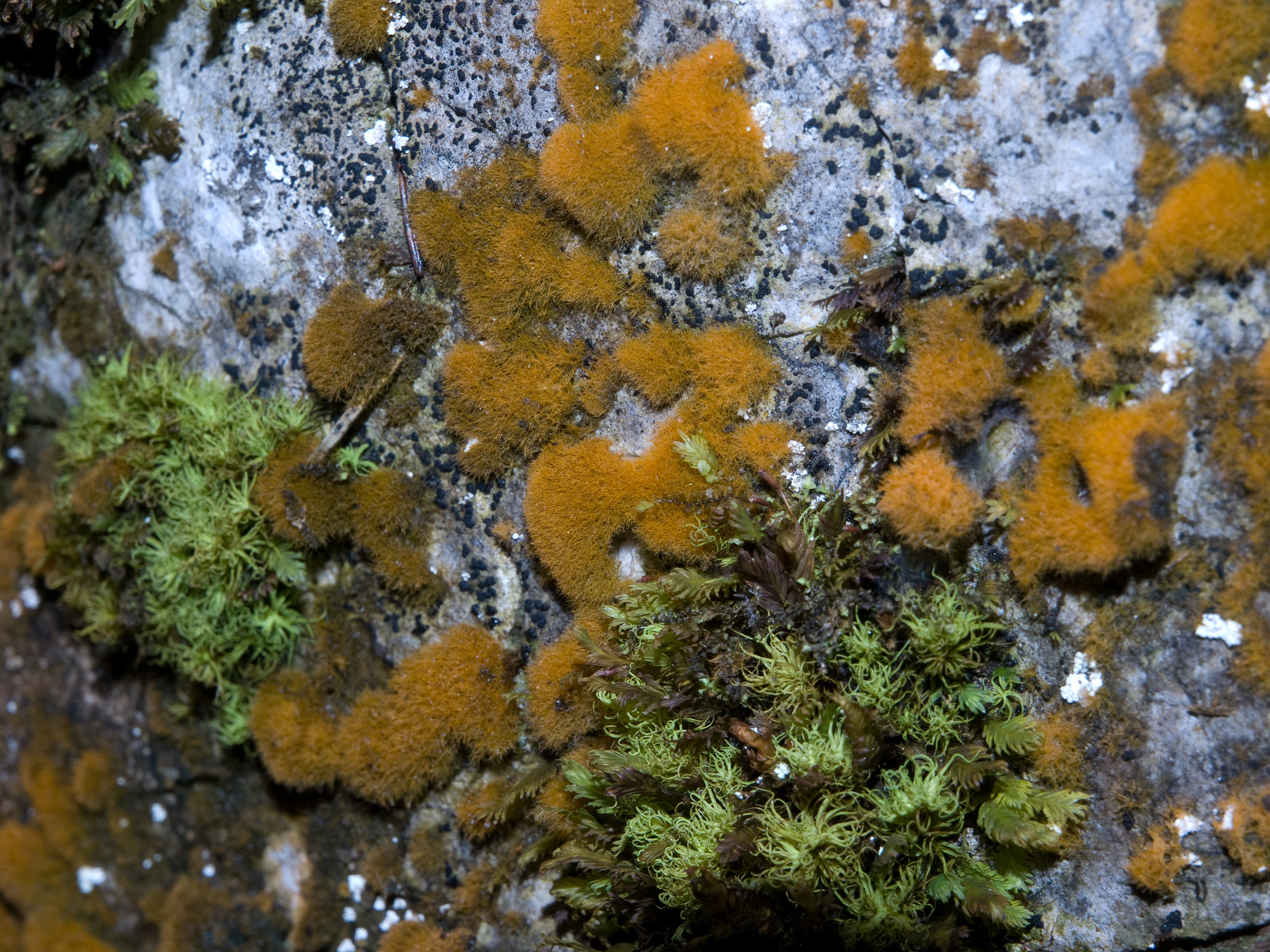
- Trentepohlia aurea on rock, Berchtesgaden, Bavaria

Scientific classification
- Kingdom: Plantae
- Division: Chlorophyta
- Class: Ulvophyceae
- Order: Trentepohliales
- Family: Trentepohliaceae
- Genus: Trentepohlia
- Species: T. aurea

Binomial name
- Trentepohlia aurea (L.) Martius

Synonyms
- Amphiconium aureum (L.) Nees; Byssus aurea L.; Byssus cryptarum L.; Chroolepus aureum Kütz.; Chroolepus oleiferum Kütz.; Chroolepus velutinum Kütz.; Tophora cryptarum (L.) Fr.; Trentepohlia capitellata Ripart; Trentepohlia germanica Glück; Trentepohlia gobii Meyer; Trentepohlia maxima Karsten; Trentepohlia velutina (Kütz.) Hansg.

= Trentepohlia aurea =

Species of chlorophyte green alga

Trentepohlia aurea, the orange rock hair, is a species of filamentous terrestrial green alga in the family Trentepohliaceae. It grows on a variety of substrates including rocks, old walls, concrete surfaces, tree bark, rotting wood, mosses, and wet soil. The orange coloration results from carotenoid pigments in the algal cells.

Trentepohlia aurea is the type species of the genus Trentepohlia. In the British Isles, it is the most widespread and abundant species of Trentepohlia. However, many records need to be reassessed, since the name has been broadly misapplied to specimens of other species, such as Trentepohlia abietina.

== Description ==
Trentepohlia aurea consists of small bushy tufts which range in color from golden yellow to orange-brown (dried specimens are duller). The thallus consists of a bunch of erect filaments, which arise from a reduced system of prostrate filaments. Erect filaments are up to 1.5 mm tall, and are unbranched or sparsely to densely branched. Erect filaments consist of cylindrical cells 10–20 (rarely 30) μm wide, 1.5 to 4 times as wide, while prostrate filaments are swollen and up to 18 μm wide.

Trentepohlia aurea has globular, ovoid or flask-shaped gametangia. They are 18–40 μm wide. Zoosporangia are 25–30 μm and 27–40 μm long.
