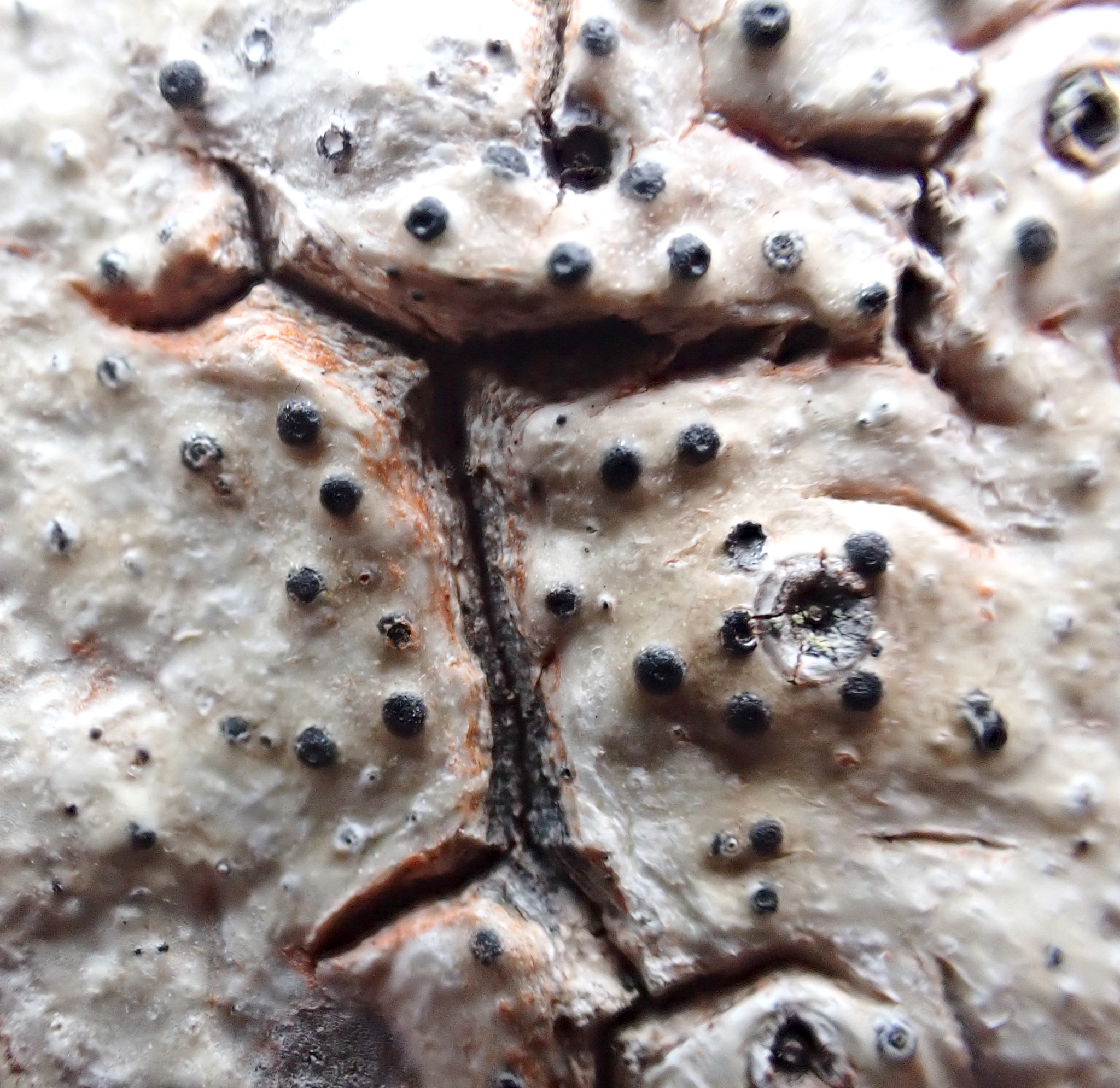

Scientific classification
- Kingdom: Fungi
- Division: Ascomycota
- Class: Eurotiomycetes
- Order: Pyrenulales
- Family: Pyrenulaceae
- Genus: Lithothelium
- Species: L. kiritea

Binomial name
- Lithothelium kiritea A.J.Marshall, Aptroot, de Lange & Blanchon (2024)

= Lithothelium kiritea =

Species of lichen

Lithothelium kiritea is a species of corticolous (bark-dwelling) lichen in the family Pyrenulaceae. Found in New Zealand, it was formally described as a new species in 2024. The lichen exclusively grows on the bark of Cordyline australis.

== Taxonomy ==
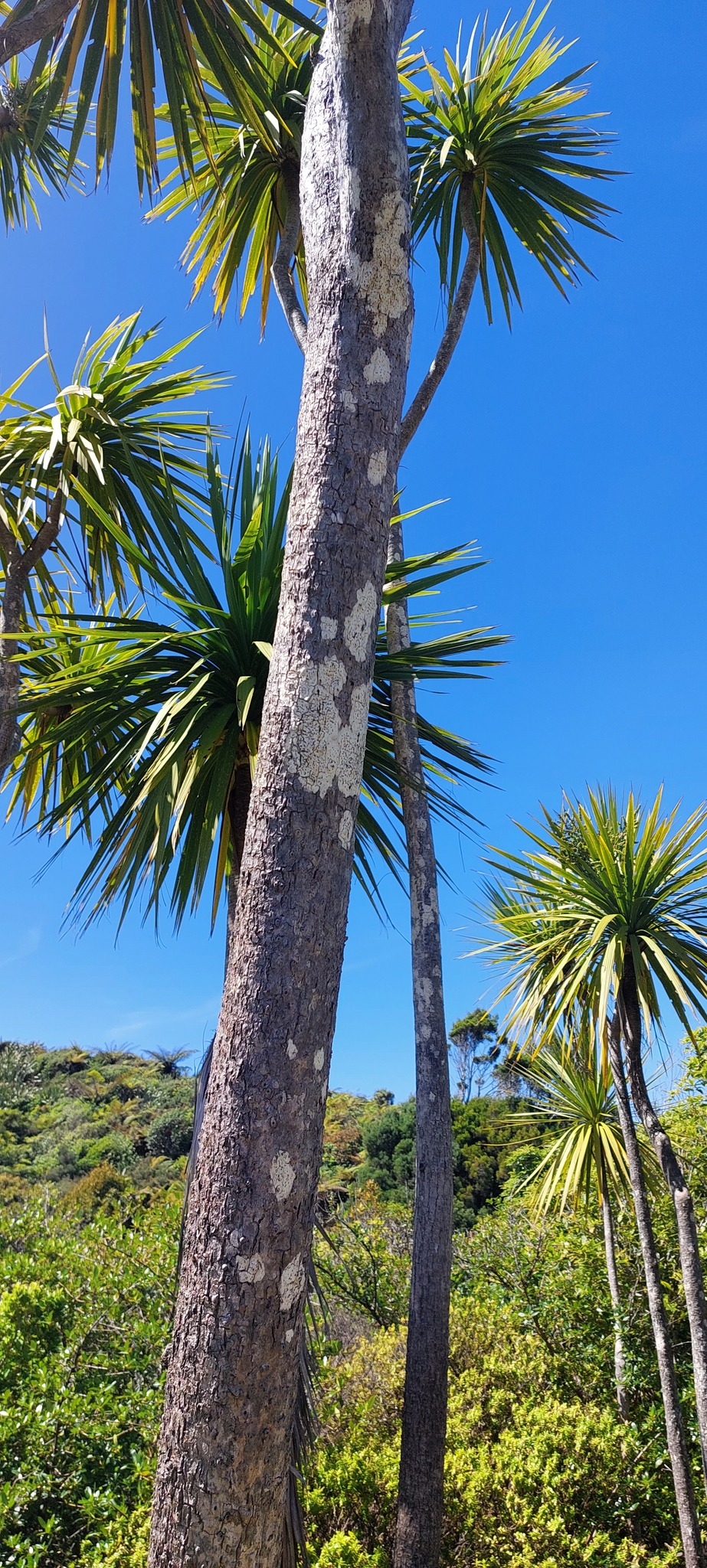
Lithothelium kiritea growing on the bark of Cordyline australis near the Waitakere / Nile River, Buller District, New Zealand

The species was described in 2024 by Andrew J. Marshall, André Aptroot, Peter de Lange and Dan Blanchon. The type specimen collected from Whatipu on the west coast of the Waitākere Ranges in March 2024, from the bark of Cordyline australis. The holotype is kept at the herbarium of Unitec Institute of Technology in Mount Albert. The species epithet, kiritea, is based on the Māori language word meaning white skinned, bestowed on the species after discussions with the west coast Auckland iwi Te Kawerau ā Maki.

== Description ==
The species can be distinguished from Lithothelium australe, found on the Chatham Islands, due to it growing on trees and not rocks, as well as by having larger spores and appearing whiter with age.

== Distribution and habitat ==
Lithothelium kiritea is primarily found in coastal areas of the western coast of the mainland of New Zealand, and grows exclusively on the bark of Cordyline australis. As of 2025 the species has only been found in New Zealand and is classed as an endemic species, however due to its westerly distribution and the lack of historical specimen data, it is theorised to be a recent adventive species from Australia.
