= Émile Bescherelle =

French botanist and bryologist

- Born: 3 January 1828; Paris
- Died: 26 February 1903 (aged 75)
- Occupations: botanist and bryologist
- Scientific career
- Author abbrev. (botany): Besch.

Émile Bescherelle (3 January 1828, Paris – 26 February 1903) was a French botanist and bryologist.

Bescherelle is known for his analysis of bryological species from diverse locations that included the French West Indies, the Mascarene Islands, Paraguay, New Caledonia, et al. With Ernest Roze he edited the exsiccata Muscinées des environs de Paris (1861-1866). In 1882 with phycologist Paul Auguste Hariot (1854–1917), he took part in a scientific expedition to Cape Horn.

The genus Bescherellia is named in his honour by Jean Étienne Duby (1798-1885).

== Written works ==
- Prodromus bryologiae mexicanae : ou, énumeration des mousses du Mexique, avec description des espéces nouvelles, 1872 - Enumeration of mosses of Mexico with description of new species.
- Florule bryologique de la Nouvelle-Calédonie, 1873 - Bryological flora of New Caledonia.
- Florule bryologique des Antilles françaises, 1876 - Bryological flora of the French Antilles.
- Florule bryologique des Antilles françaises ou énumération et description des mousses nouvelles recueillies à la Guadeloupe et à la Martinique, 1876 - Bryological flora of the French West Indies, or enumeration and description of new moss species from Guadeloupe and Martinique.
- Note sur les mousses du Paraguay : récoltées par M. Balansa de 1874 é 1877 - Note on mosses of Paraguay, collected by Benedict Balansa (1825V1891) from 1874 to 1877.
- Florule bryologique de la Réunion : de Maurice et des autres iles Austro-Africaines de l'océan Indien, 1880-81 - Bryological flora of Réunion : Mauritius and other islands of the Indian Ocean.
- Catalogue des mousses observées en Algerie, 1882 - Catalog of mosses seen in Algeria.
- Mission scientifique du cap Horn, 1882–1883. Tome V, Botanique with Paul Auguste Hariot (1854-1917) & others - Scientific mission to Cape Horn in 1882–1883.
- Hépatiques nouvelles des colonies françaises, 1888 - New liverwort species from colonies of France.

In addition, he was a collaborator towards Narcisse Théophile Patouillard's publication of Catalogue raisonné des plantes cellulaires de la Tunisie.
