= Printzina =

Scientific classification
- Kingdom: Plantae
- Division: Chlorophyta
- Class: Ulvophyceae
- Order: Trentepohliales
- Family: Trentepohliaceae
- Genus: Printzina; R.H.Thompson & D.E.Wujek

Species
- Printzina lagenifera

Synonyms
- Printzina R.H.Thomps. & Wujek

Genus of algae

Printzina is a genus of green algae. in the family Trentepohliaceae.

== Species ==
Printzina lagenifera (Hildebrandt) Thompson et Wujek.

=== Description ===
Appears as small, reddish cushion-like masses. Consisting of entangled filaments of globular or elliptical cells 6 - 12μm wide.. It forms reddish streeks.
