= Paul Auguste Hariot =

French pharmacist and phycologist

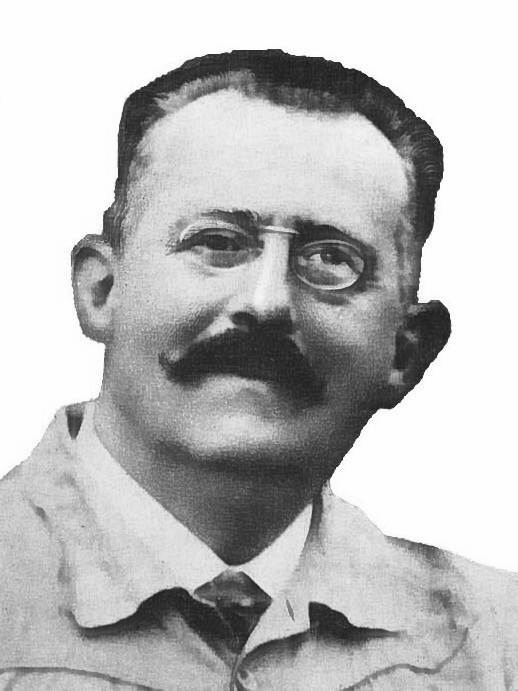
Paul Auguste Hariot

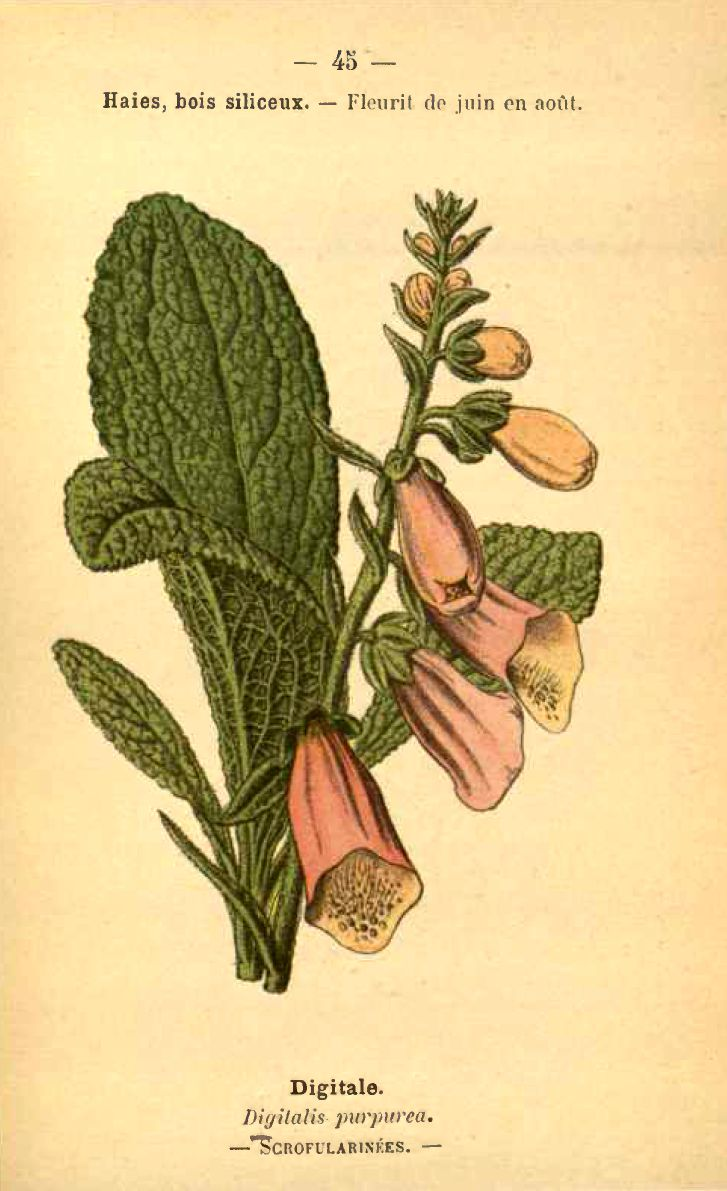
Digitalis purpurea from Atlas Colorié des Plantes

Paul Auguste Hariot (1854 – 5 July 1917), the son of Louis Hariot (also a pharmacist), was a French pharmacist and noted phycologist, best known for his 1900 publication Atlas Colorié des Plantes Médicinales Indigènes.

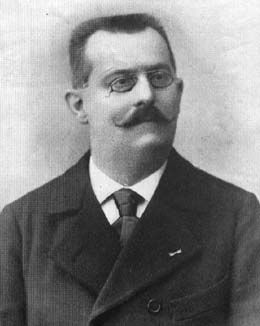
Paul Auguste Hariot (ca. 1900)

Hariot took up the position of botanical assistant at the École Supérieure de Pharmacie in the late 1870s during his training in pharmacy in Paris. On qualifying in 1882, his rather quiet and studious life was changed by an invitation to accompany the botanist Émile Bescherelle (1828-1903) on an expedition to Cape Horn aboard the ship La Romanche, a trip during which he amassed a fine collection of algae. On returning to France he studied natural sciences and was awarded a degree in 1888 whereupon he joined the National Museum of Natural History in Paris, working in the cryptogamic herbarium under Professor van Tieghem. Here he worked on classifying specimens that had been gathered by Sébastien Vaillant (1669-1722), and those of the brothers Edmond and Charles Tulasne. He revised when necessary the taxonomy and systematics of the species described, and his name appears frequently as a second author for many species of algae. In 1890 he was awarded the Prix Montagne by the Academy of Sciences for his monograph on terrestrial algae of the genus Trentepohlia. He was awarded the Prix Desmazières for 1913 for his work on marine flora.

Besides publishing a guide to phycology in 1892, he contributed to a number of illustrated books on plants, and published the first practical guide to seaweeds from the coast of France.

Hariot's main interest was in algae and fungi, and later including the rusts. He was one of the founders of the Plant Pathological Society of France, and at the time of his death, was curator of the Cryptogamic Herbarium at the Jardin des Plantes.

He is commemorated by Lagenophora hariotii (Franch.) T.R.Dudley, Chamaeangis hariotiana (Kraenzl.) Schltr., Microterangis hariotiana (Schltr.) Senghas and Saxifraga hariotii Luizet & Soulié.

== Obituary ==
- Mangin L. 1918. Paul Hariot (1854-1917). Bulletin de la Société de Pathologie Végétale de France 5 (2): 65-70
