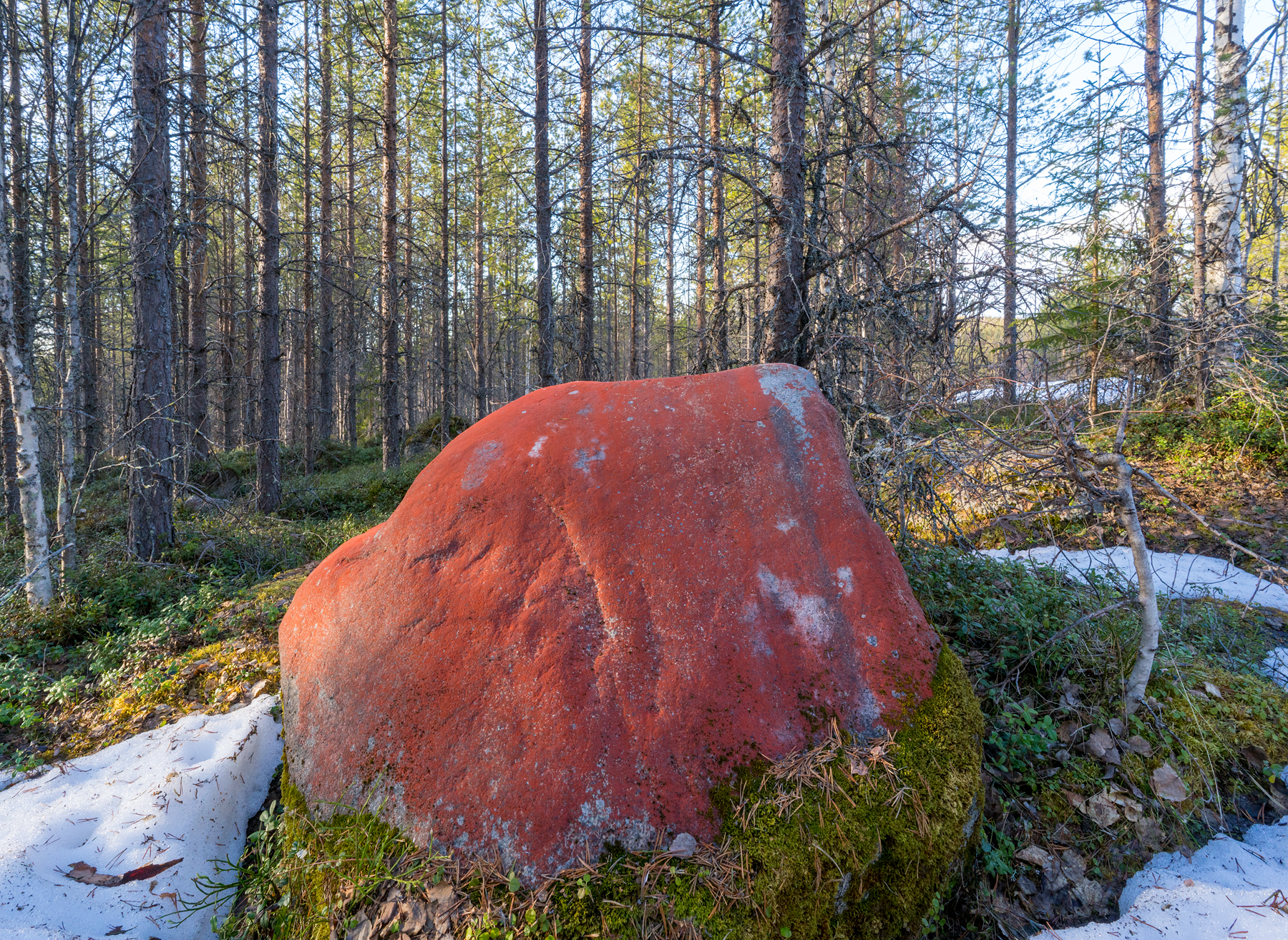

Scientific classification
- Kingdom: Plantae
- Division: Chlorophyta
- Class: Ulvophyceae
- Order: Trentepohliales
- Family: Trentepohliaceae
- Genus: Trentepohlia
- Species: T. jolithus

Binomial name
- Trentepohlia jolithus (L.) Wallroth

= Trentepohlia jolithus =

Species of alga

Trentepohlia jolithus (basionym: Byssus jolithus) is an alga species in the genus Trentepohlia. Despite being a member of the group of green algae (Chlorophyta), it is usually colored bright orange or red due to the presence of carotenoid pigments.

Trentepohlia jolithus occurs in cool, humid regions. It mostly grows on rocks, boulders and concrete walls, but it has also been reported growing on wood. It often forms large orange mats, particularly in forests in northern Europe. In Germany, it is called "Veilchenstein" or "Veilchenmoos" due to the smell of violet which emanates from the alga when wet. It is widespread in Europe, and may have a cosmopolitan distribution, but records from tropical regions need reassessment. In Mount Gongga, China, a variety of this species (T. jolithus var. yajiagengensis) forms reddish-orange mats on rocks, and has become a tourist attraction.

== Description ==
Trentepohlia jolithus consists of filaments that are dark orange, reddish or crimson in color (dried specimens are olive green or gray). The thallus usually consists of erect filaments which are mostly decumbent and deeply entangled into a parenchymatous habit, so that there is little distinction between erect and prostrate filaments. Sometimes, the thalli consist of erect bushes of filaments up to 2 mm tall, with a small prostrate network of filaments. Cells are 10–35 μm wide and 1–3 times longer than wide; they are globular, barrel-shaped, elliptical or cylindrical. When the thallus is differentiated into erect and prostrate parts, the prostrate filaments mostly have globular cells. Apical cells are blunt, up to 6 times as long as wide, and are often inflated at the center. Cell walls vary in thickness and can be multilayered.

Like other Trentepohlia species, reproduction occurs asexually and sexually. Gametangia are lateral, intercalary or terminal, 36–42 μm in diameter. Zoosporangia are ovoid or spherical, and are borne on a suffultory cell (a flask-shaped cell with a bent neck to which the zoosporangia is attached).

== History ==
In 2025, Russia's Ministry of Foreign Affairs submitted a diplomatic note to Estonia's chargé d'affaires in Moscow over the supposed vandalism of war graves in Estonia, claiming that they had been splashed with red paint. Investigation determined that Trentepohlia jolithus, which is common in Estonia, was growing on the markers.
