= Phyllopsora ochroxantha =

Scientific classification
- Kingdom: Fungi
- Division: Ascomycota
- Class: Lecanoromycetes
- Order: Lecanorales
- Family: Ramalinaceae
- Genus: Phyllopsora
- Species: P. ochroxantha

Binomial name
- Phyllopsora ochroxantha Zahlbr. (1939)

Synonyms
- Lecidea ochroxantha; Phyllopsora corallina var. ochroxantha; Phyllopsora ochroxantha; Psora ochroxantha

Species of lichen

Phyllopsora ochroxantha is a species of corticolous, squamulose lichen.

It has a reddish brown prothallus, medium sized green granules with isidia, and narrow ellipsoid simple ascospores. It contains methyl 2,7-dichloropsoromate and methyl 2,7 dichloronorpsoromate, phyllopsorin, chlorophyllopsorin, vicanicin and norvicanicin.

It is found in Australia and North and South America.
