= Coenogonium atherospermatis =

Scientific classification
- Kingdom: Fungi
- Division: Ascomycota
- Class: Lecanoromycetes
- Order: Gyalectales
- Family: Coenogoniaceae
- Genus: Coenogonium
- Species: C. atherospermatis

Binomial name
- Coenogonium atherospermatis Kantvilas, Rivas Plata & Lücking (2018)

Species of lichen

Coenogonium atherospermatis is a species of lichen in the family Coenogoniaceae. Found in Tasmania, it was formally described as a new species in 2018 by lichenologists Gintaras Kantvilas, Eimy Rivas Plata, and Robert Lücking. The type specimen was collected by the first author near Little Fisher River at an altitude of 820 m (2,690 ft), where it was found in a cool temperate rainforest growing on Atherosperma moschatum. It is locally abundant at this location, where it usually occurs at elevations of more than about 500 m (1,600 ft). The species epithet refers to the genus of the preferred host tree. Within Tasmanian rainforest vegetation, Atherosperma is known for harbouring "a distinctive suite of lichens", including C. atherospermatis.

== Description ==
Coenogonium atherospermatis has a crusty, pale greenish to yellowish-grey thallus that forms irregular patches up to 30 mm (1.2 in) wide. It does not have a prothallus. The photobiont cells are more or less spherical, broadly ellipsoid to oblong, and occur in clumps or short chains. The apothecia, or fruiting bodies, are sessile and flat, with a yellowish-beige disc that is usually plane but may be slightly convex when old. The margin is cream, smooth, and glossy. The proper excipulum is 50–80 μm thick, while the hypothecium is colorless to pale yellowish and measures 15–100 μm thick in the upper part. The hymenium is 45–55 μm thick and contains asci and paraphyses. The ascospores are irregularly biseriate, measuring 6.0–8.5 by 2.5–3 μm. Pycnidia were not found in this lichen.
