= Rabenhorst =

Rabenhorst is a surname, and refers to the following:

== People ==
- Adolf von Rabenhorst (1846-1925), German general
- Bernhard von Rabenhorst (1801-1873), head of the Ministry of War of Saxony for 1849–1866
- Gottlob Ludwig Rabenhorst (1806-1881), German botanist and mycologist
- Ernst-Peter Rabenhorst (b.1940), German diplomat
- Harry Rabenhorst (1898–1972), U.S. football player and coach
- Jan Rabenhorst, character in Mordshunger
- Uwe Rabenhorst, German academic

== Other ==
- Haus Rabenhorst, German fruit juice company
- Rabenhorst (Admannshagen-Bargeshagen), human settlement in Germany
