= Lithothelium echinatum =

Scientific classification
- Domain: Eukaryota
- Kingdom: Fungi
- Division: Ascomycota
- Class: Eurotiomycetes
- Order: Pyrenulales
- Family: Pyrenulaceae
- Genus: Lithothelium
- Species: L. echinatum

Binomial name
- Lithothelium echinatum Aptroot (2006)

Species of lichen

Lithothelium echinatum is a species of saxicolous (rock-dwelling) lichen in the family Pyrenulaceae. Found in China, it was formally described as a new species in 2006 by Dutch lichenologist André Aptroot. The type specimen was collected by the author in Green Stone Park (Xishuangbanna, Yunnan) at an altitude of 600 m (2,000 ft); here, the pale green, thin crust was found growing on limestone. Lithothelium echinatum is the only species in genus Lithothelium that has echinate ascospores (i.e., with pointed spines).
