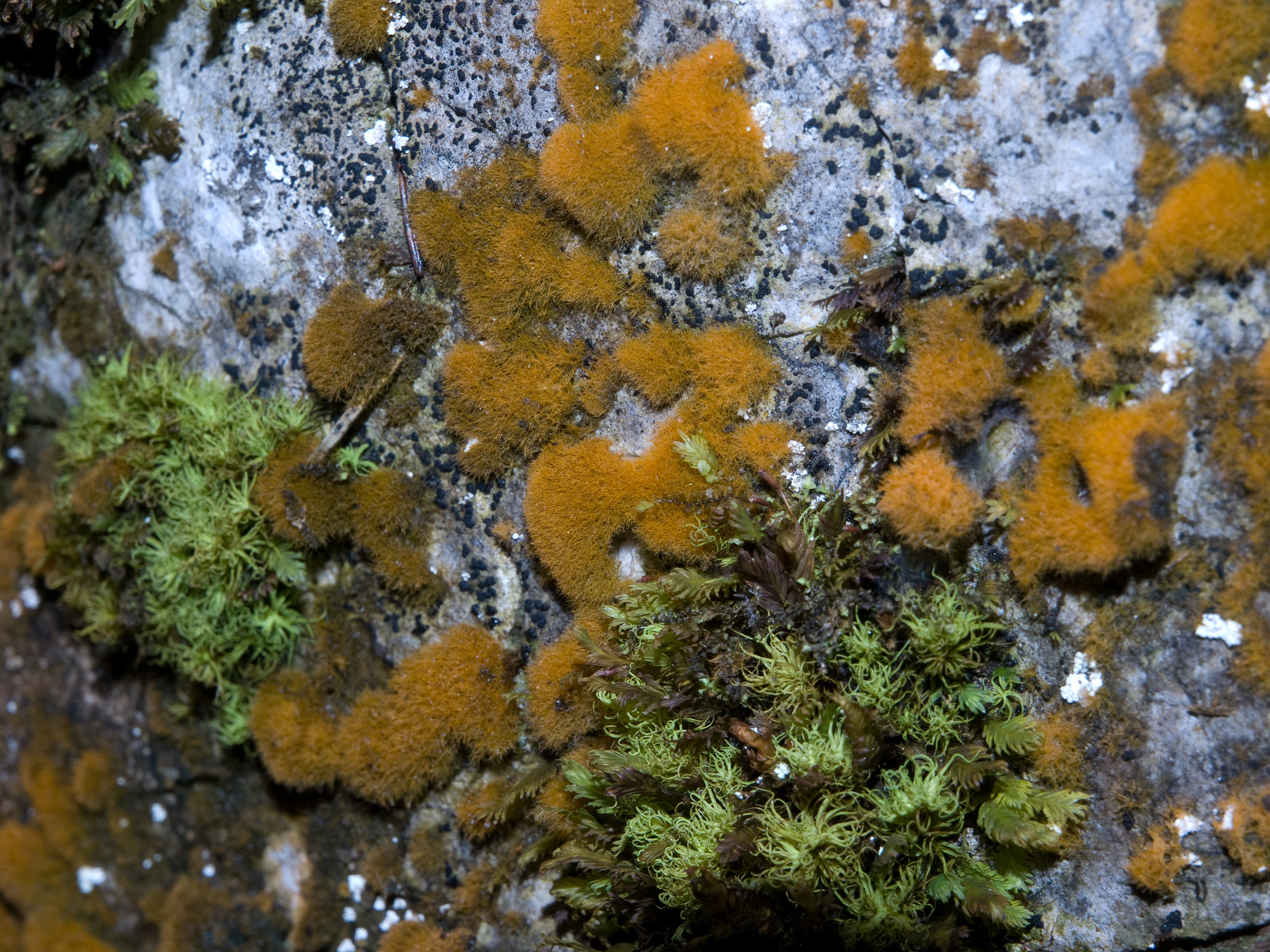
- Trentepohlia aurea

Scientific classification
- Kingdom: Plantae
- Division: Chlorophyta
- Class: Ulvophyceae
- Order: Trentepohliales; Chadefaud ex R.H.Thompson & D.E.Wujek
- Family: Trentepohliaceae; Hansgirg

Genera
- Cephaleuros; Chroolepus; Friedaea; Lochmium; Phycopeltis; Rhizothallus; Sporocladus; Stomatochroon; Trentepohlia

= Trentepohliaceae =

Family of algae

Trentepohliaceae are a family of green algae, and the only family in the order Trentepohliales. It is a member of the Ulvophyceaen green algae. The family is characterized by traits like net-like chloroplasts without pyrenoids, cell walls with plasmodesmata and cytokinesis by production of a phragmoplast. They are subaerial algae with a worldwide distribution.

== Description ==
Typically, members of Trentepohliaceae consist of uniseriate filaments that are variably branched. In some genera, the filaments are branched and produce small, bushy tufts; in others, the filaments are crowded, and grow into a pseudoparenchymatous small disc. Reproduction is both asexual and sexual. Zoospores are formed in what is called a "sporangiate-lateral", in which a sporangium is attached via a highly modified branch called a "suffultory cell". Their life cycle involves an alternation of generations between a sporophyte phase and a gametophyte phase; the sporophyte and gametophyte may be identical in morphology (isomorphic) or not (heteromorphic).

== Ecology ==
Trentepohliaceae is an exclusively subaerial taxon, and are one of the most common and widespread types of subaerial algae. They have a cosmopolitan distribution, but are most diverse in the tropics and subtropics. They grow on a wide range of substrates, such as rocks, tree barks, wood, leaves, and sometimes bare soil. Some genera, Cephaleuros and Stomatochroon, are parasites which grow within plant tissue.

Some Trentepohliales algae, such as Trentepohlia species, show remarkable desiccation tolerance and adaptability to a wide range of light and temperature conditions, as evidenced by research on alpine and coastal environment species.

As subaerial algae, they are often closely associated with lichen-forming fungi and are common as phycobionts within lichens.

== Taxonomy ==
Trentepohliaceae is generally considered to include five genera:

- Cephaleuros – a parasite of vascular plants, growing within leaves or plant tissue.
- Phycopeltis – an epiphyte typically growing on leaves; the filaments are branched to form a flat, rounded disk.
- Printzina – similar to Trentepohlia, and differs in the morphology of the zoosporangia and prostrate filaments. Mainly occurs in shaded habitats.
- Trentepohlia – consists of erect branched filaments growing from a prostrate system. It grows attached to various exposed substrates, such as tree bark, rocks, and soils.
- Stomatochroon – a parasite of vascular plants, and grows within the substomatal chambers of leaves. It is inconspicuous and rarely reported.

AlgaeBase lists some additional genera; these genera, such as Friedaea, are of uncertain status.

The family and order is taxonomically well-defined, but the unique combination of ecological and ultrastructural characters has made placement difficult. Previous classifications have variously placed Trentepohliales in the classes Chlorophyceae, Ulvophyceae, and even its own class the Trentepohliophyceae. Molecular phylogenetic studies have clearly established its place in Ulvophyceae.

The genera, as currently circumscribed, are polyphyletic or paraphyletic and in need of revision. For example, some recent sources do not recognize Printzina. Their phylogenetic relationships are shown below (not all taxa are included):

- - - - - - Cephaleuros
          - Stomatochroon
        - Trentepohlia aurea
      - Trentepohlia arborum + Printzina lagenifera
    - Lichen phycobionts
  - Trentepohlia jolithus + Trentepohlia umbrina + Printzina bosseae + Phycopeltis
