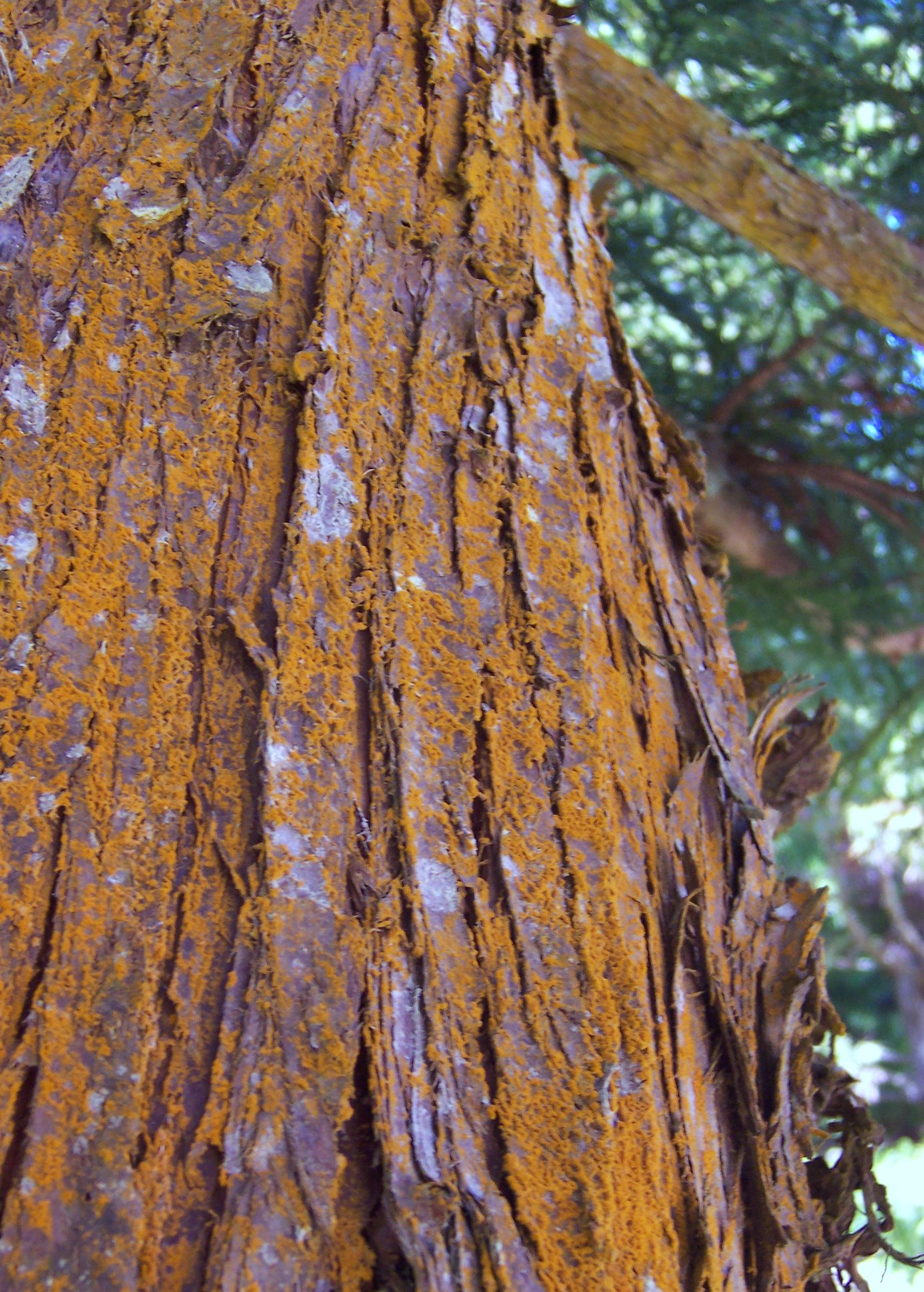
- Trentepohlia sp. on Cryptomeria japonica bark

Scientific classification
- Domain: Eukaryota
- Supergroup: Archaeplastida
- Clade: Viridiplantae
- Division: Chlorophyta
- Class: Ulvophyceae
- Order: Trentepohliales
- Family: Trentepohliaceae
- Genus: Trentepohlia; Mart.

Type species
- Trentepohlia aurea (L.) C.Martius

Species
- See text

Synonyms
- Byssus Linnaeus, 1753 - unaccepted; Chroolepus C.Agardh, 1824 - unaccepted; Tophora E.M.Fries, 1825 - unaccepted

= Trentepohlia (alga) =

Genus of algae

Trentepohlia is a genus of filamentous chlorophyte green algae in the family Trentepohliaceae, living free on terrestrial supports such as tree trunks and wet rocks or symbiotically in lichens. The filaments of Trentepohlia often have a strong orange colour (photograph at right) caused by the presence of large quantities of carotenoid pigments which mask the green of the chlorophyll.

== Nomenclature ==
Organisms belonging to the genus Trentepohlia were first described by Linnaeus in 1759; he named his species Byssus aureus (currently known as Trentepohlia aurea). The genus was circumscribed by Carl Friedrich Philipp von Martius in Fl. Crypt. Erlang. on page 351 in 1817. The genus name of Trentepohlia is in honour of Johann Friedrich Trentepohl (1748–1806), who was a German clergyman and botanist. He worked as a lecturer and Pastor in various places in Wesermarsch. Martius' name was conserved in favor of the moss genus Trentepohlia and the Brassicaceae genus Trentepohlia both published by Albrecht Wilhelm Roth; the names were published earlier, in 1794 and 1800 respectively.

== Description ==
Trentepohlia consists of branched filaments of cells; the filament occurs in two systems, a prostrate and an erect system. Both prostrate and erect systems are variously branched; the branching is typically alternate or irregular, rarely opposite. Occasionally, the erect system of filaments may be reduced. The ends of filaments may be somewhat attenuated, and end in a cellulose cap or a cylindrical, unicellular hair. Cells are cylindrical, barrel-shaped or spherical, one to five times longer than broad, with thin or thick and lamellate cell walls. Within each cell there are multiple, discoid chloroplasts or a single band-shaped chloroplast; chloroplasts lack pyrenoids. The chloroplast is typically obscured by carotenoid pigments, giving the cells an orange or red color.

=== Reproduction ===
The life cycle of Trentepohlia is poorly known. It is known to reproduce both asexually and sexually. Asexual reproduction is via zoospores, which are quadriflagellate and produced in terminal sporangia. Sexual reproduction is by biflagellate gametes which are produced in spherical or urn-shaped gametangia. The gametangia are located either at the ends of filaments (terminal) or in at the sides or middle of filaments (lateral, intercalary).

Trentepohlia is generally hypothesized to undergo an alternation of generations. In this scheme, it alternates between haploid gametophytes which produce biflagellate isogamous gametes, and diploid sporophytes which undergo meiosis to form quadriflagellate zoospores. However, it has also been reported that biflagellate gametes are able to germinate into new organisms without fusing sexually.

== Habitat and ecology ==
Trentepohlia is a subaerial alga, and is commonly found in humid climates. It typically occurs on moist rocks, wood, tree trunks, and leaves. It is easily distinguished due to the orange, felt-like growths. Patches of Trentepohlia often obscure posts and inscriptions; this is an economic nuisance as it becomes necessary to paint over them. Trentepohlia abietina has been reported growing on spiders in Queensland, Australia.

Trentepohlia species form close associations with fungal hyphae, and can form what is known as a "protolichen". They are widespread true phycobionts in lichens, such as the "secret writing" crustose lichen genera Graphis, Graphina, Gyalecta and Opegrapha. In some regions, lichens associated with Trentepohlia appear to be less common than lichens with other photobionts. With global warming, European lichens with Trentepohlia as phycobionts have increased in recent decades.

== Diversity ==
Trentepohlia contains about 50 species, and is present on almost all continents. It is mostly diverse and common in tropical and subtropical areas but several species also occur in temperate environments including Britain and Ireland.

Species of Trentepohlia have traditionally been distinguished based on morphological characters, such as the branching pattern, size and shape of cells, morphology and arrangement of reproductive structures, presence of hairs, and substratum. However, the morphology of Trentepohlia is highly variable and often dependent on the external environment. It is not uncommon to find different morphological character states of Trentepohlia in the same individual; additionally, some individuals may be intermediate in morphology and thus not assignable to a single species. In addition, the genus (and several species within it) are known to be polyphyletic. Thus, the genus as a whole is in need of taxonomic revision.

== Species ==
From AlgaeBase:

- Trentepohlia abietina (Flotow ex Kützing) Hansgirg
- Trentepohlia afra (Massalongo) A.B.Cribb
- Trentepohlia allorgei Bourrelly & Manguin
- Trentepohlia angadickalensis M.V.N.Panikkar & P.Sindhu
- Trentepohlia annulata F.Brand
- Trentepohlia arborum (C.Agardh) Hariot
- Trentepohlia aurea (L.) C.Martius
- Trentepohlia betulina (Rabenhorst) Hariot
- Trentepohlia bleischii (Rabenhorst) Wille
- Trentepohlia bosseae De Wildeman
- Trentepohlia calamicola (Zeller) De Toni & Levi
- Trentepohlia chapmanii Rindi & López-Bautista
- Trentepohlia chinensis (Harvey) Hariot
- Trentepohlia cochunensis Tracanna
- Trentepohlia cucullata De Wildeman
- Trentepohlia cyanea Karsten
- Trentepohlia depressa (J.Müller) Hariot
- Trentepohlia dialepta (Nylander) Hariot
- Trentepohlia diffracta (Krempelhüber) Hariot
- Trentepohlia diffusa De Wildeman
- Trentepohlia dusenii Hariot
- Trentepohlia effusa (Krempelhuber) Hariot
- Trentepohlia ellipsicarpa Schmidle
- Trentepohlia elongata (Zeller) De Toni]]
- Trentepohlia flava (Kützing) De Toni
- Trentepohlia flintii Sarma
- Trentepohlia fusco-atra (Zeller) De Toni
- Trentepohlia hunanensis C.-C.Jao
- Trentepohlia hygrophila Moschkova
- Trentepohlia infestans Rindi & J.López-Bautista
- Trentepohlia jolithus (L.) Wallroth
- Trentepohlia jucunda (Cesati) Hariot
- Trentepohlia leprieurii Hariot
- Trentepohlia lichenicola (Smith) De Toni
- Trentepohlia longicarpa A.K.M.N.Islam
- Trentepohlia luteofusca De Wildeman
- Trentepohlia minima Schmidle
- Trentepohlia negeri Brand
- Trentepohlia odorata (F.H.Wiggers) Wittrock
- Trentepohlia pathanamthittaensis Panikkar & Sindhu
- Trentepohlia peruana (Kützing) Printz
- Trentepohlia piceana Meyer
- Trentepohlia randhawaiana A.B.Cribb
- Trentepohlia recurvata Wittrock & Nordstedt
- Trentepohlia reinschii Hansgirg
- Trentepohlia rigidula (J.Müller) Hariot
- Trentepohlia santurcensis Tiffany
- Trentepohlia sparsa (Harvey) Harvey
- Trentepohlia spinosa A.K.M.N.Islam
- Trentepohlia sundarbanensis G.G.Satpati & R.Pal
- Trentepohlia thevalliensis Panikkar & Sindhu
- Trentepohlia treubiana De Wildeman
- Trentepohlia umbrina (Kützing) Bornet
- Trentepohlia uncinata (Gobi) Hansgirg
- Trentepohlia willeana Hansgirg
- Trentepohlia willei (Tiffany) Printz

== Gallery ==
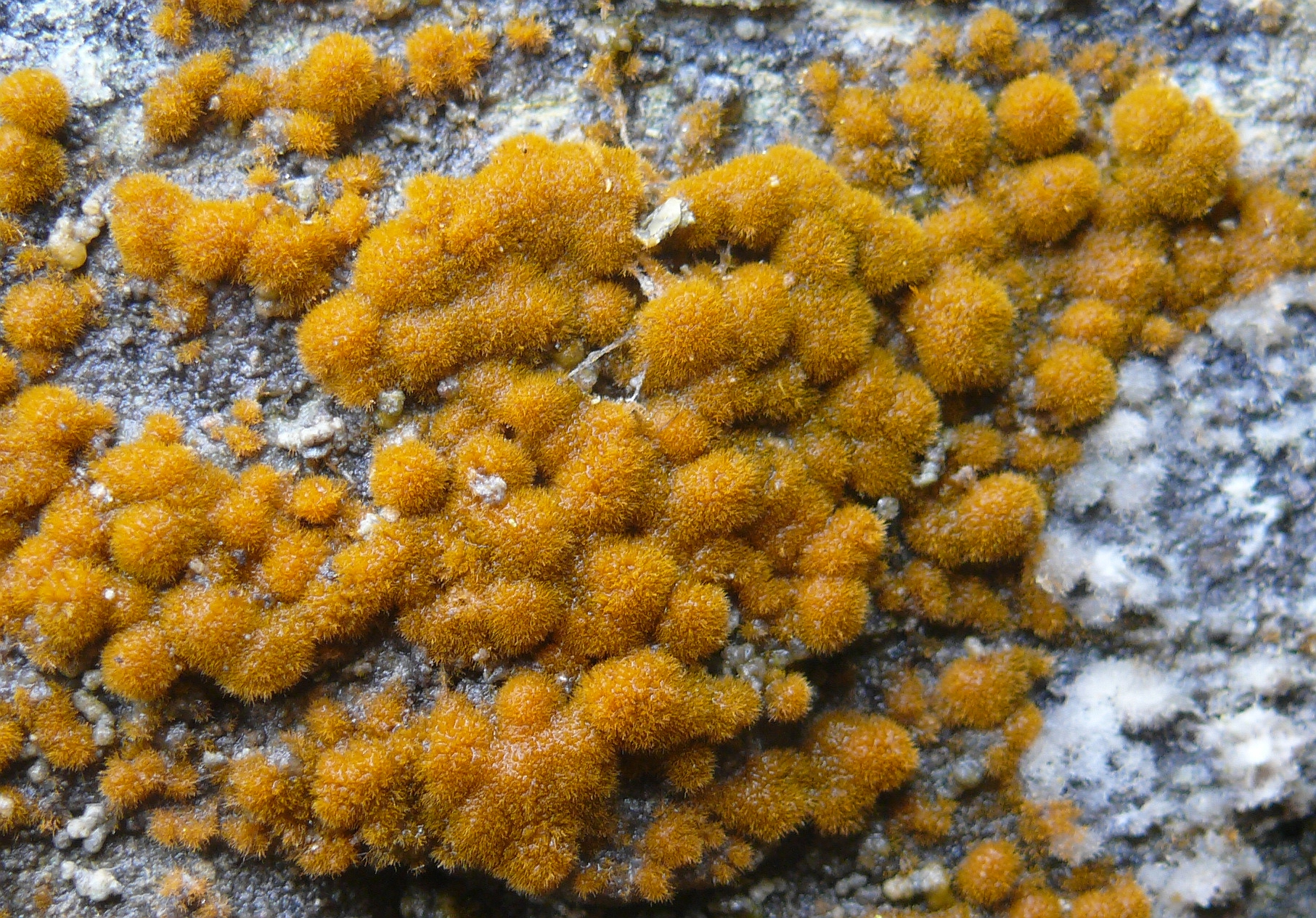
Trentepohlia aurea, Tauberland, Germany

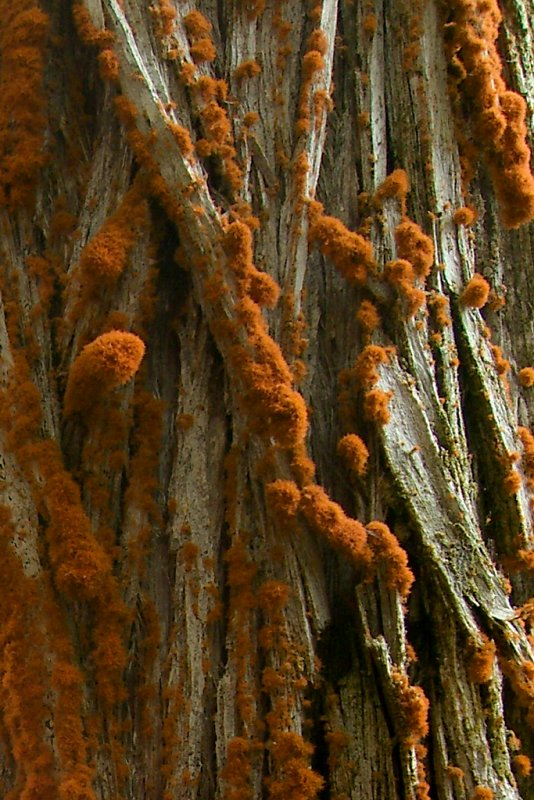
Trentepohlia aurea var. polycarpa grows prolifically on Monterey Cypress trees at Point Lobos, California

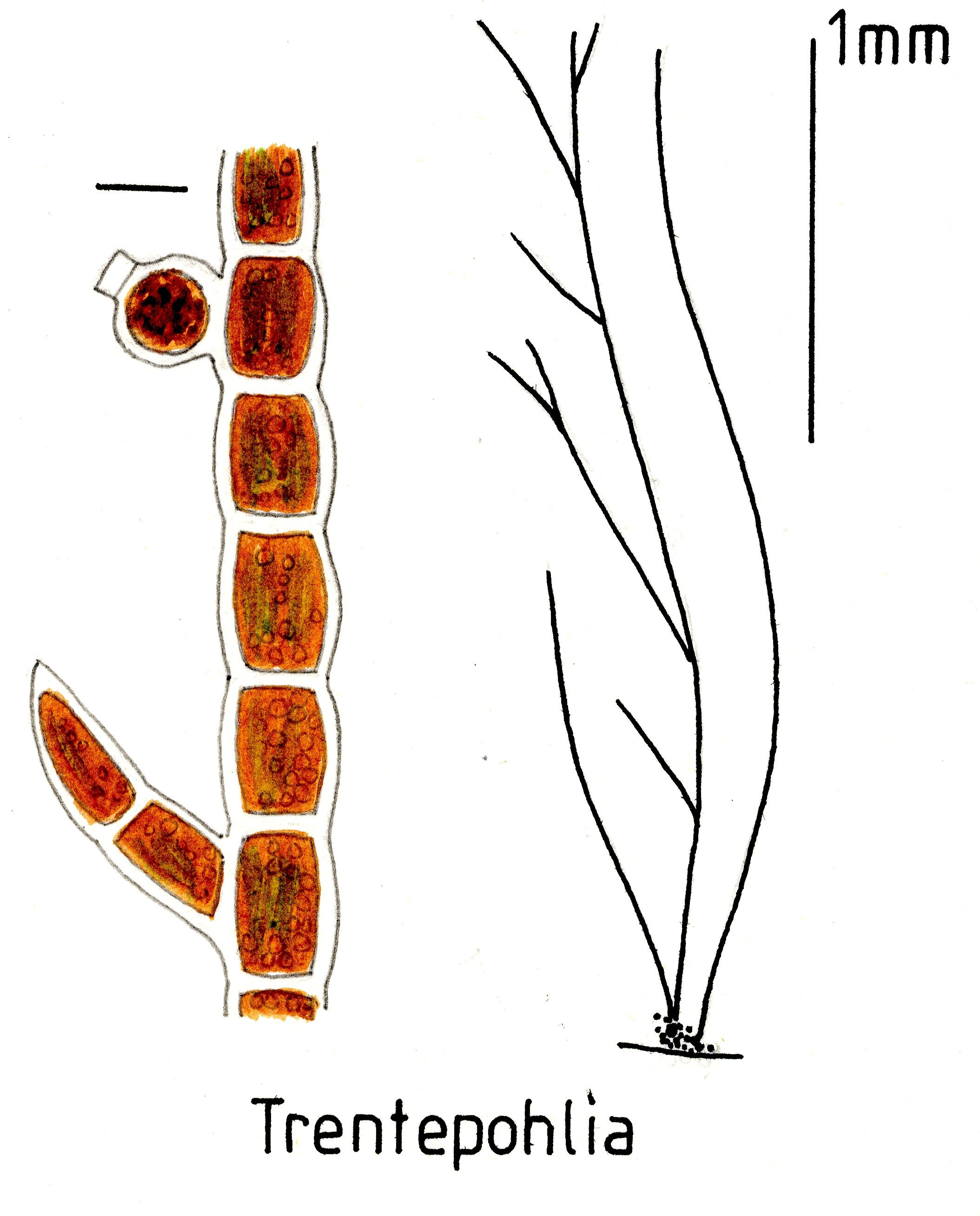
Illustration
