= Corticolous lichen =

Lichen that grows on bark

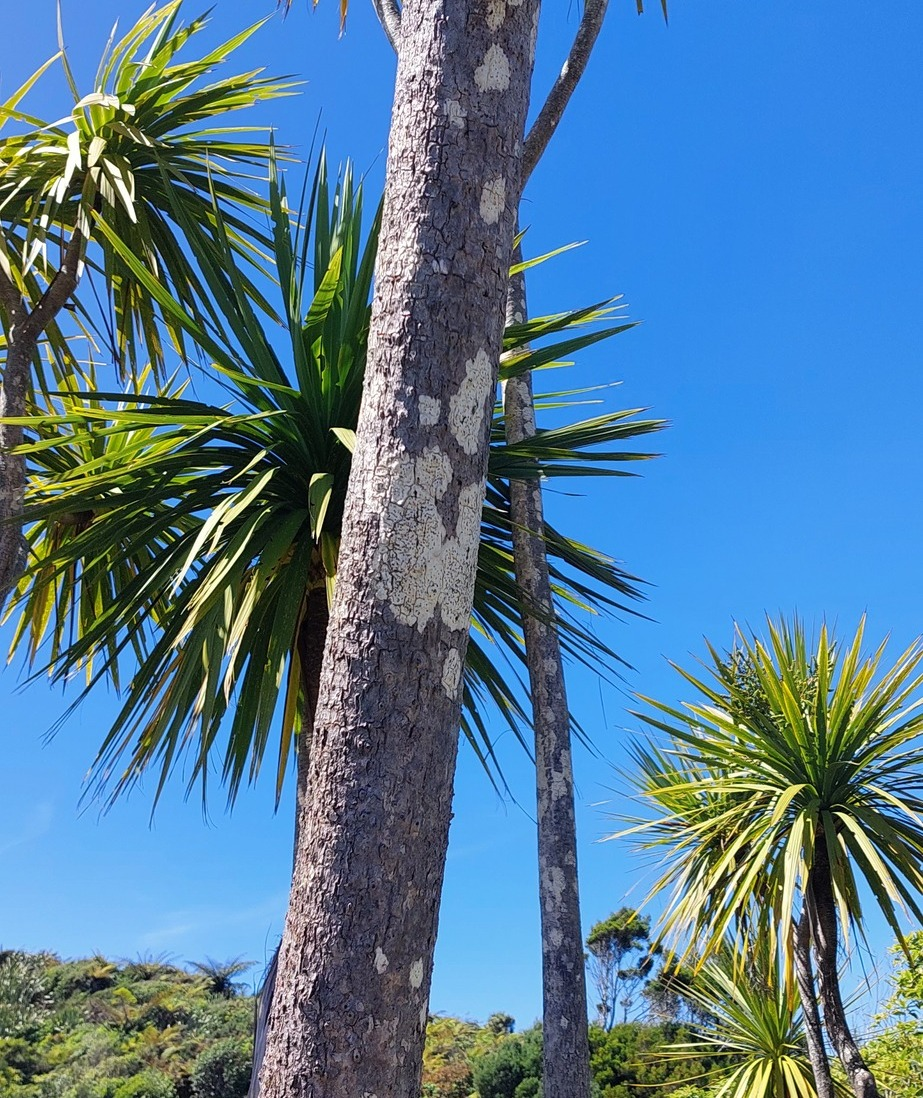
Lithothelium kiritea, a corticolous lichen that exclusively grows on the bark of Cordyline australis in New Zealand

A corticolous lichen is a lichen that grows on bark. This is contrasted with lignicolous lichen, which grows on wood that has had the bark stripped from it, and saxicolous lichen, which grows on rock.

Examples of corticolous lichens include the crustose lichen Graphis plumierae, foliose lichen Melanohalea subolivacea and the fruticose Bryoria fuscescens.

== See also ==
- Phyllopsora ochroxantha
