= Compositrema borinquense =

Scientific classification
- Domain: Eukaryota
- Kingdom: Fungi
- Division: Ascomycota
- Class: Lecanoromycetes
- Order: Graphidales
- Family: Graphidaceae
- Genus: Compositrema
- Species: C. borinquense

Binomial name
- Compositrema borinquense Mercado-Díaz, Lücking & Parnmen (2014)

Species of lichen

Compositrema borinquense is a species of corticolous (bark-dwelling) crustose lichen in the family Graphidaceae. It is found in northeastern Puerto Rico, where it grows on the trunks of trees in the palo Colorado forest of El Yunque National Forest. This lichen differs from others in the genus Compositrema, most notably from its closest relative, C. thailandicum, due to its distinctive, irregularly radiating columella–a central shaft of fungal hyphae in the ascoma.

== Taxonomy ==
Compositrema borinquense was first formally described and named in 2014 by lichenologists Joel Mercado-Díaz, Robert Lücking, and Sittiporn Parnmen. The type specimen was found in the municipality of Canóvanas, in the Barrio Cubuy area or Puerto Rico. The specimen was found on the trunk of an unidentified tree.

The genus Compositrema is known for its compound ascomata with a brain-like appearance. This new species, C. borinquense, exhibits a close morphological resemblance to genus Stegobolus, although they are not closely related. Without molecular data, it could easily be mistaken for a species of Stegobolus due to its complex columella. This unique feature distinguishes it from all known species in the two genera. The species that bears the most resemblance to C. borinquense is Stegobolus radians, but even then, the columella strands in the latter are much thinner, white, and regularly radiate, compared to the thicker, irregularly arranged strands in C. borinquense.

== Description ==
The thallus of the Compositrema borinquense, or the vegetative tissue of the lichen, corticolous, meaning it grows on the bark of trees, and can reach a diameter of up to 10 cm (4 in). It is light grey-green, shiny, and has a smooth to uneven surface. The thallus lacks crystal clusters and is 80–100 μm thick, with a dense cortex and a thick photobiont layer comprising cells of Trentpohlia, a type of green alga.

The ascomata, or fruiting bodies of the lichen, are rounded to irregular in shape, prominent to broadly sessile, with a lateral thalline margin, and a diameter of 0.7–1.5 mm. The disc of the ascomata is filled with a distinct columella composed of numerous, irregularly arranged, cream-white strands. This distinct feature sets Compositrema borinquense apart from its closest relative, Compositrema thailandicum, which lacks such a columella.

== Habitat and distribution ==
Compositrema borinquense is found in the understory of the palo Colorado forest in El Yunque National Forest, Puerto Rico. It grows on the living trunks of unidentified trees in the shaded areas of the forest. The distribution of the species is limited to this region.
