= Compositrema isidiofarinosum =

Scientific classification
- Domain: Eukaryota
- Kingdom: Fungi
- Division: Ascomycota
- Class: Lecanoromycetes
- Order: Graphidales
- Family: Graphidaceae
- Genus: Compositrema
- Species: C. isidiofarinosum

Binomial name
- Compositrema isidiofarinosum Mercado-Díaz, Lücking & Parnmen (2014)

Species of lichen

Compositrema isidiofarinosum is a species of corticolous (bark-dwelling) crustose lichen in the family Graphidaceae. This lichen was discovered in Puerto Rico. It flourishes in the shaded understory of the palo Colorado forest in El Yunque National Forest, clinging to the trunks of unidentified trees.

== Taxonomy ==
Compositrema isidiofarinosum was first scientifically described in 2014 by lichenologists Joel Mercado-Díaz, Robert Lücking, and Sittiporn Parnmen. The species name, isidiofarinosum, hints at one of its unique characteristics: a powder-like, isidiate thallus. The type specimen was discovered by the first author on a tree trunk in Canóvanas, Puerto Rico, specifically in Barrio Cubuy, on the trail leading to Pico del Toro.

== Description ==
Compositrema isidiofarinosum is a lichen species with a powdery, continuous thallus that measures up to 10 cm (4 in) in diameter. Its surface is light greenish white, adorned with sparse, scattered, corticate isidia, which are tiny, outgrowth-like propagules that aid in reproduction. The presence of these isidia, along with the relatively small ascomata (fruiting bodies of the lichen) and an inconspicuous columella (a central pillar-like structure within the ascomata), set it apart from other species in Compositrema.

The lichen's photobiont (the alga in the symbiotic relationship) is Trentepohlia, a genus known for its distinctive yellow-green cells. The asci (spore-producing cells) are spindle-shaped to club-shaped, and each typically contains eight ascospores. These spores are hyaline (translucent), ellipsoid, and three times longer than wide with dimensions of 12–15 by 5–6 μm.

In terms of secondary metabolites (lichen products), Compositrema isidiofarinosum produces psoromic acid and the related substances subpsoromic acid and 2'-O-demethylpsoromic acid.

=== Similar species ===
Superficially, Compositrema isidiofarinosum is reminiscent of Melanotrema or Redingeria species because of its ecorticate thallus and ascomata featuring an irregular columella. However, molecular data has firmly placed it within Compositrema. This species has a striking degree of morphological convergence with unrelated species, and its unique characteristics have been confirmed by the discovery of similar specimens in Venezuela, notably within Henri Pittier National Park.

== Habitat and distribution ==
The lichen was initially discovered in the understory of the palo Colorado forest within El Yunque National Forest, Puerto Rico. It was observed growing on the trunk of an unidentified tree, demonstrating a preference for shaded environments.
