= Hyalopyrenia =

Scientific classification
- Kingdom: Fungi
- Division: Ascomycota
- Class: incertae sedis
- Order: incertae sedis
- Family: incertae sedis
- Genus: Hyalopyrenia; H.Harada (1996)
- Species: H. japonica

Binomial name
- Hyalopyrenia japonica H.Harada (1996)

Single-species fungal genus

Hyalopyrenia is a fungal genus in the division Ascomycota. Its placement within Ascomycota are uncertain (incertae sedis), and it has not been placed with certainty in any class, order, or family. Both the genus its only species, Hyalopyrenia japonica, were described as new to science by the Japanese lichenologist Hiroshi Harada in 1996.

== Taxonomy ==
Hyalopyrenia was described in 1996 by Hiroshi Harada from material collected on friable rock in a forest in Chiba Prefecture, central Japan. The genus is monospecific, with only its type species, Hyalopyrenia japonica. Hyalopyrenia has a thin, inconspicuous crustose thallus with a Trentepohlia photobiont (algal partner). Its perithecia are half-immersed and have a completely colourless (hyaline) wall. The asci are bitunicate and non-amyloid, with a distinct ocular chamber, and they produce transversely septate, hyaline spores; paraphyses and periphyses are present. Its taxonomic placement was considered uncertain, with no clear close affinities among other pyrenocarpous lichens. The holotype (Harada 14052) is deposited in the herbarium of the Natural History Museum and Institute, Chiba (CBM-FL-4718). In Japan, the species has been given the vernacular name シロザネゴケ ('silvery moss').

The paraphyses are sparse and can be overlooked beside the prominent periphyses, which could lead to confusion with members of Verrucariaceae. Because the paraphyses and periphyses are very similar in form and are mainly distinguished by their position relative to the asci, the "periphyses" in this genus may differ in development from those typical of Verrucariaceae. Developmental (ontogenetic) studies may be needed to clarify their nature. The genus resembles Strigula in some microscopic characters and Pyrenula in occasionally forming a columella, but it differs from genera such as Aspidothelium and Dermatocarpon.

== Description ==
The thallus forms a crust on rock and often grows partly within the substrate (endolithic), so it may be almost invisible in the field. Where visible, it forms greenish-grey patches that closely follow the rock surface; the patches may be smooth or slightly warted, sometimes with small fissures. Anatomically it lacks a distinct outer layer (cortex). It consists of an upper algal layer with Trentepohlia and a lower, endolithic zone of sparse, colourless hyphae within the rock.

Perithecia are produced singly or in small groups and are typically half-immersed in the thallus or substrate, measuring about 0.15 to 0.5 mm across. They are very pale pinkish-brown and often roughened, and the upper part is commonly split by lengthwise cracks. The ostiole (opening) may be hard to see or more evident and can extend into a short beak. The perithecial wall (exciple) is colourless (hyaline) and becomes strongly thickened in the upper part. The hamathecium includes prominent, mostly simple (unbranched) periphyses and sparse, almost simple paraphyses.

The asci are clavate (club-shaped), bitunicate and non-amyloid, with a distinct ocular chamber. Each ascus contains eight spores. The ascospores are hyaline and thin-walled and are typically 7-septate (divided by seven cross-walls), measuring about 30–36 μm × 6–8 μm. They are slightly curved to nearly straight, and an epispore (outer spore wall) was reported as absent. Pycnidia (asexual fruiting bodies) were not observed in the type material.

== Habitat and distribution ==
Based on the original description, Hyalopyrenia is known from central Japan (Chiba Prefecture, on Honshu). The site was a warm-temperate hillside in secondary mixed forest, with both evergreen and deciduous hardwoods.

== See also ==
- List of Ascomycota genera incertae sedis
