= Clandestinotrema =

Scientific classification
- Kingdom: Fungi
- Division: Ascomycota
- Class: Lecanoromycetes
- Order: Graphidales
- Family: Graphidaceae
- Genus: Clandestinotrema; Rivas Plata, Lücking & Lumbsch (2012)

Type species
- Clandestinotrema clandestinum (Ach.) Rivas Plata, Lücking & Lumbsch (2012)

Genus of lichens

Clandestinotrema is a genus of lichen-forming fungi in the family Graphidaceae. It has 18 species. They typically inhabit montane and cloud forest at higher elevations in the tropics.

== Taxonomy ==
The genus was circumscribed in 2012 by Eimy Rivas Plata, Robert Lücking, and H. Thorsten Lumbsch, with Clandestinotrema clandestinum assigned as the type species. It contains species formerly classified in the genera Ocellularia and Thelotrema, and corresponds to the Ocellularia clandestina group as defined by Frisch in 2006. The genus name combines the species epithet of the type, clandestina, with the suffix -trema.

Molecular phylogenetic analysis strongly supports Clandestinotrema as a monophyletic clade, which can be distinguished from other taxa in its subfamily (Fissurinoideae) by its whitish thallus, which is often loosely corticate or ecorticate, and ocellularioid, usually carbonized, and often columellate ascomata. In this analysis, Clandestinotrema was divided into two sister clades. The first clade corresponds to species with narrow apothecial pores with an entire margin and finger-like columella, represented by the type species, C. clandestinum. The second clade corresponds to species with broadly open apothecia with a fissured margin and broad-stump-shaped columella, represented by C. leucomelaenum and C. stylothecium.

== Description ==
The thallus of Clandestinotrema species can be white-grey to yellow-grey and have a smooth to uneven texture. It may or may not have a dense, prosoplectenchymatous cortex. The photobiont layer and medulla contain clusters of calcium oxalate crystals. The apothecia (a reproductive structure) can be immersed to erumpent and have a rounded to angular shape. The disc of the apothecia is usually covered by a narrow pore and filled with brown-black, often white-pruinose columella. The margin can be entire to fissured-lobulate and is fused and brown-black. The columella is usually present and mostly carbonized. The excipulum (outer layer of the apothecium) is prosoplectenchymatous and carbonized, and there are no periphysoids (specialized cells). The paraphyses (sterile cells) are unbranched. The ascospores (spores produced inside the apothecia) usually have eight spores per ascus (sac-like structure), are 3-septate to muriform, and are ellipsoid with thick septa and diamond-shaped lumina. When young, the central septum becomes thickened before further septa appear, which makes them look Caloplaca-like. They are colorless and non-amyloid. This genus does not produce any lichen products or stictic acid.

== Habitat and distribution ==
Unlike most other thelotremoid Graphidaceae, Clandestinotrema species primarily occur in high-altitude wet cloud forests with abundant bryophyte growth, making them ecologically distinct.

== Species ==
In its original circumscription, Clandestinotrema contained 12 species. Several more have been added since.

- Clandestinotrema analorenae Lücking (2012)
- Clandestinotrema antoninii (Purvis & P.James) Rivas Plata, Lücking & Lumbsch (2012)
- Clandestinotrema caloplacosporum Aptroot & M.Cáceres (2023) – Brazil
- Clandestinotrema carbonera I.D.Medeiros (2018) – Venezuela
- Clandestinotrema cathomalizans (Nyl.) Rivas Plata, Lücking & Lumbsch (2012)
- Clandestinotrema clandestinum (Ach.) Rivas Plata, Lücking & Lumbsch (2012)
- Clandestinotrema ecorticatum (Mangold) Rivas Plata, Lücking & Lumbsch (2012)
- Clandestinotrema erumpens (H.Magn.) Rivas Plata, Lücking & Lumbsch (2012)
- Clandestinotrema hepaticicola Lücking (2015)
- Clandestinotrema leucomelanum (Nyl.) Rivas Plata, Lücking & Lumbsch (2012)
- Clandestinotrema maculatum (Hale) Rivas Plata, Lücking & Lumbsch (2012)
- Clandestinotrema melanotrematum (Hale) Rivas Plata, Lücking & Lumbsch (2012)
- Clandestinotrema minutum Aptroot (2016) – Madagascar
- Clandestinotrema pauperius (Nyl.) Rivas Plata, Lücking & Lumbsch (2022)
- Clandestinotrema portoricense Merc.-Díaz, Lücking & Parnmen (2014) – Puerto Rico
- Clandestinotrema protoalbum (Hale) Rivas Plata, Lücking & Lumbsch (2012)
- Clandestinotrema stylothecium (Vain.) Rivas Plata, Lücking & Lumbsch (2012)
- Clandestinotrema tenue (Hale) Rivas Plata, Lücking & Lumbsch (2012)
