= Compositrema =

Scientific classification
- Kingdom: Fungi
- Division: Ascomycota
- Class: Lecanoromycetes
- Order: Graphidales
- Family: Graphidaceae
- Genus: Compositrema; Rivas Plata, Lücking & Lumbsch (2012)

Type species
- Compositrema cerebriforme J.E.Hern. & Lücking (2012)

Species
- C. borinquense C. cerebriforme C. isidiofarinosum C. thailandicum

Genus of lichen-forming fungi

Compositrema is a genus of lichen-forming fungi in the family Graphidaceae. It has four species. The genus was circumscribed in 2012 by lichenologists Eimy Rivas Plata, Robert Lücking, and Helge Thorsten Lumbsch, with C. cerebriforme assigned as the type species. The genus is distinguished by its unique, composite pseudostromatic ascomata (i.e., fruiting bodies with a stroma made of both thallus tissue and bits of host tissue), which sets it apart from the otherwise similar genus Stegobolus.

== Taxonomy ==
The genus Compositrema was circumscribed in 2012 by lichenologists Eimy Rivas Plata, Robert Lücking, and H. Thorsten Lumbsch. The type species, Compositrema cerebriforme, was jointly described by Jesús Ernesto Hernández Maldonado and Lücking. The name of the genus makes reference to its "composite" pseudostromatic ascomata, a feature that starkly distinguishes it from the genus Stegobolus. The ending -trema is derived from the Latinised Greek neuter noun meaning "perforation; aperture; opening; orifice". Phylogenetically, Compositrema is closely akin to Stegobolus but is genetically quite distant, forming a strongly supported clade that is a distant relative of the Myriotrema album group. Compositrema is in the tribe Ocellularieae of the subfamily Graphidoideae in the Graphidaceae. Two species were initially included in this genus, and two others added in 2014.

== Description ==
Compositrema lichens have a pale green-grey to olive-green thallus that is smooth to uneven, with a dense cortex that has a prosoplectenchymatous tissue structure. Sometimes, isidia are present on these lichens. The photobiont layer contains scattered clusters of calcium oxalate crystals among its cells. The apothecia, or the reproductive parts of the lichen, are grouped into distinct pseudostromata, which are rounded to angular and can be either erumpent or sessile. The disc-like part of these pseudostromata is pale brown and dusted with a thin white pruina. On a more microscopic level, Compositrema lichens have unbranched paraphyses, and each ascus contains eight ascospores that are ellipsoid in shape with thick septa and lens-shaped lumina. These ascospores range from colourless to pale brown and react with iodine to give a violet-blue colour. Psoromic acid is a secondary metabolite (lichen product) that occurs in Compositrema.

== Species ==
- Compositrema borinquense Merc.-Díaz, Lücking & Parnmen (2014) – Puerto Rico
- Compositrema cerebriforme J.E.Hern. & Lücking (2012) – Venezuela
- Compositrema isidiofarinosum Merc.-Díaz, Lücking & Parnmen (2014) – Puerto Rico
- Compositrema thailandicum Rivas Plata, Papong & Lumbsch (2012) – Thailand
