= Thelotrema amazonicum =

Scientific classification
- Kingdom: Fungi
- Division: Ascomycota
- Class: Lecanoromycetes
- Order: Graphidales
- Family: Graphidaceae
- Genus: Thelotrema
- Species: T. amazonicum

Binomial name
- Thelotrema amazonicum Rivas Plata & Lücking (2012)
- Type locality: Los Amigos Biological Station

Species of lichen-forming fungus

Thelotrema amazonicum is a species of lichen-forming fungus in the family Graphidaceae. It is a light gray-green, bark-dwelling lichen with a finely powdery surface and small, sunken fruiting bodies, known only from lowland tropical rainforest in Madre de Dios, Peru. The species was described in 2012 and is considered unusual for the genus Thelotrema, which is not typically found in Amazonian lowland habitats.

== Taxonomy ==
Thelotrema amazonicum was described as a new species by Eimy Rivas Plata and Robert Lücking in 2012, based on material collected in the Los Amigos Research and Training Center (CICRA) in Amazonian Peru. The species epithet amazonicum alludes to the species' occurrence in the Amazon basin, an unusual habitat for a member of Thelotrema, which is more typically associated with other ecological settings.

== Description ==
The thallus grows on bark and is light gray-green, continuous, and finely powdery (farinose), lacking a cortex. It can reach about 10 cm across and is about 30–50 μm thick. The photosynthetic partner photobiont is the green alga Trentepohlia, and the medulla is indistinct and white.

The fruiting bodies (apothecia) are sunken in the thallus (immersed) and angular to rounded, about 0.25–0.4 mm in diameter, with a pale brown disc lightly frosted with white (white-pruinose) and partly covered by the outer wall (excipulum). The apothecial margin appears "double", with a visible gap separating the inner fungal rim (proper margin) from the outer thallus-derived rim (thalline margin). A central column (columella) is absent. Each ascus contains eight colorless, oval (ellipsoid) ascospores that are divided into 10–14 cells (9–13-septate) and measure 40–50 × 7–8 μm; the spores stain violet-blue with iodine (I+ violet-blue). No secondary metabolites were detected by thin-layer chromatography (P–, K–).

== Habitat and distribution ==
The species is known from the type locality in the Department of Madre de Dios, Peru, in tropical lowland rainforest at about 270 m elevation, where it was found on tree bark in secondary forest.
