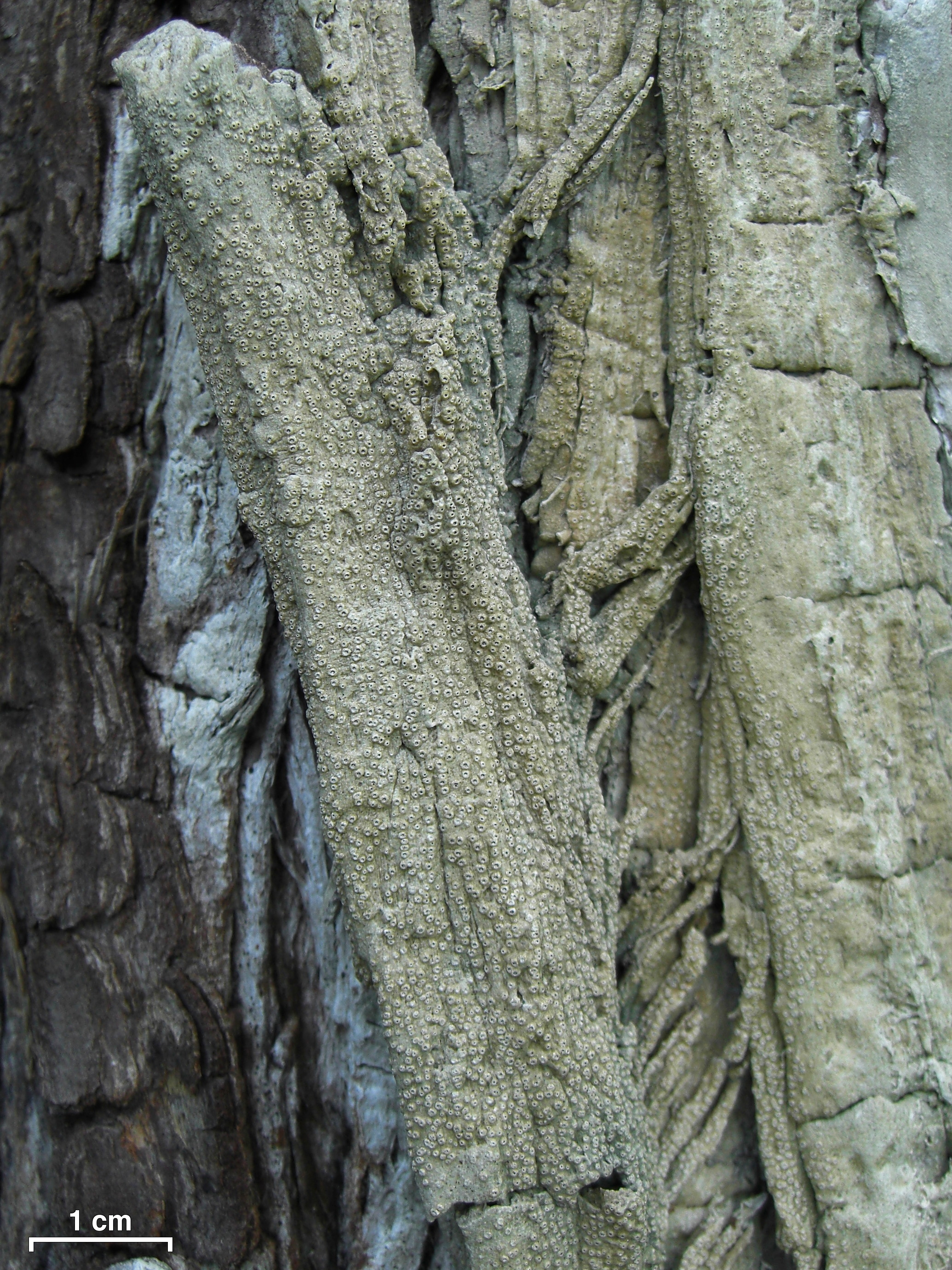
- Stegobolus (not identified to species) found in the Big Cypress National Preserve, Florida, US

Scientific classification
- Domain: Eukaryota
- Kingdom: Fungi
- Division: Ascomycota
- Class: Lecanoromycetes
- Order: Graphidales
- Family: Graphidaceae
- Genus: Stegobolus; Mont. (1845)

Type species
- Stegobolus berkeleyanus Mont. (1845)

= Stegobolus =

Genus of lichen-forming fungi

Stegobolus is a genus of lichen-forming fungi in the family Graphidaceae. Established in 1845 by the French botanist Camille Montagne, the genus contains 16 species distinguished by their unique fruiting structures that initially appear drum-shaped and closed, later bursting open by shedding their roof-like covering. These bark-dwelling lichens are found in humid tropical and warm temperate forests worldwide, where they serve as indicators of undisturbed woodland habitats due to their sensitivity to canopy opening and drought.

== Taxonomy ==
The genus Stegobolus was circumscribed in 1845 by the French botanist Camille Montagne, who assigned Stegobolus berkeleyanus as the type species. In his original description, Montagne characterised the genus by its crustaceous thallus and bursting apothecia that are initially drum-shaped and closed by a lens-like epithecium, which later splits around its circumference and opens widely when the epithecium falls away. He noted that the interior features a membranaceous excipulum that tears open to reveal a gelatinous nucleus. Montagne observed that while the genus resembles Thelotrema in having a closed epithecium, it differs fundamentally in its mode of opening. He derived the genus name from the Greek words στεγος ('roof') and βάλλω ('to throw'), referring to the characteristic shedding of the epithecium. Montagne noted the strong morphological similarity between Stegobolus and Elastogia, and also drew comparisons to Craterio, though he noted that the orders are very different and not all features can be compared. The type specimen was collected by the Miles Joseph Berkeley from the Philippines, and Montagne dedicated this single species to Berkeley in recognition of his sharing of his Philippine cryptogam collection.

== Description ==
Stegobolus forms a smooth, pale grey-green to yellow-olive crust (thallus) that embeds directly in the bark and lacks a true cortex. Its lirellae are short to elongate (0.5–3 mm), initially covered by a thin thalline veil that soon splits to expose a narrow, often faintly white-pruinose slit. The walls are entirely carbonised, creating sharp black outlines, while a colourless excipulum borders the interior. The clear hymenium is non-inspersed and traversed by smooth paraphyses; eight hyaline (colourless and translucent) ascospores mature in each Graphis-type ascus. These spores become distinctly muriform—divided by numerous transverse and a few longitudinal septa—measure roughly 25–60 × 8–14 μm, and remain negative to staining with iodine (I–). Most species are chemically poor or produce only trace amounts of stictic acid-series depsidones, a contrast to the anthraquinone-rich script lichens of some allied genera.

The co-existence of fully carbonised lirellae, a non-inspersed hymenium and large, I– muriform spores distinguishes Stegobolus from superficially similar genera. Redingeria has an inspersed hymenium; Hemithecium and Acanthothecis possess spinulose periphysoids; Kalbographa is set apart by its vivid orange epithecium; and the plate-forming Platygramme and Platythecium develop broader shields rather than narrow slits.

== Ecology ==
Stegobolus is pantropical to warm-temperate in distribution, recorded from lowland Amazonian rainforest, West-Central African evergreen stands, Indo-Malayan dipterocarp forest and moist sclerophyll woodlands in Queensland. All known species are corticolous, occupying shaded boles and large branches where high humidity and limited direct sunlight prevail; they decline rapidly after canopy opening or prolonged desiccation, so their presence is a practical indicator of long-standing, moisture-rich woodland habitat.

== Species ==
As of June 2025, Species Fungorum (in the Catalogue of Life) accepts 16 species of Stegobolus:

- Stegobolus actinotus (Tuck.) Frisch & Kalb (2006)
- Stegobolus amazonus M.Cáceres, Aptroot & Lücking (2014)
- Stegobolus anamorphoides (Nyl.) Lücking (2012)
- Stegobolus anamorphus (Nyl. ex Vain.) Frisch & Kalb (2006)
- Stegobolus auberianus (Mont.) Frisch & Kalb (2006)
- Stegobolus carneopustulatus Frisch & Kalb (2006)
- Stegobolus croceoporus (Hale) Frisch (2006)
- Stegobolus fissus (Müll.Arg.) Frisch (2006)
- Stegobolus metaphoricus (Nyl.) Frisch (2006)
- Stegobolus percolumellatus (Sipman) Frisch (2006)
- Stegobolus polillensis (Vain.) Frisch (2006)
- Stegobolus pruinatus (Nagarkar & Hale) Frisch (2006)
- Stegobolus radians (Müll.Arg.) Frisch (2006)
- Stegobolus schizostomus (Tuck.) Frisch & Kalb (2006)
- Stegobolus subwrightii (Hale) Rivas Plata, Lücking & Lumbsch (2012)
- Stegobolus wrightii (Tuck.) Frisch (2006)
