= Aspidothelium glabrum =

Scientific classification
- Kingdom: Fungi
- Division: Ascomycota
- Class: Lecanoromycetes
- Order: Thelenellales
- Family: Thelenellaceae
- Genus: Aspidothelium
- Species: A. glabrum

Binomial name
- Aspidothelium glabrum Lücking, Aptroot & Sipman (2008)

Species of lichen-forming fungus

Aspidothelium glabrum is a species of corticolous (bark-dwelling), crustose lichen in the family Thelenellaceae. It was described in 2008 from material collected on bark in western Costa Rica, and has since been recorded in Brazil. The lichen forms pale mineral-gray patches that may be edged by a thin black border, and it produces tiny, glossy, cream-to-gray bumps on the surface that contain its spores. Under the microscope, its spore-producing sacs contain four colorless spores that are divided into many small compartments, a feature used to separate it from similar species.

== Taxonomy ==
It was described as a new species in 2008 by the lichenologists Robert Lücking, André Aptroot, and Harrie Sipman, based on material collected on bark in Carara National Park in Puntarenas Province, Costa Rica at 100 m (330 ft) elevation.

== Description ==
The lichen has a pale mineral-gray thallus (the main lichen body) that is often partly immersed in the substrate, and it can be edged by a narrow black line of hypothallus (a dark marginal zone of fungal tissue) up to 0.2 mm wide. Its perithecia (flask-shaped fruiting bodies) sit directly on the surface as smooth, hemispherical to barrel-shaped structures about 0.2–0.4 mm across. They are pale cream to gray and glossy, becoming brownish gray toward the top, and each has a depressed black ostiole (opening); in cross section, the ostiole appears as a black cap set slightly below the perithecial apex.

Microscopically, the tissue between the asci (the hamathecium) is not oil-filled (remains clear), and its filaments can be partly branched. Each ascus contains four hyaline (colorless) spores that are fusiform and densely muriform (divided by multiple cross-walls and lengthwise walls), with 7–9 transverse septa and 1–3 longitudinal septa, some of them oblique; the spores measure about 40–50 × 12–15 μm. In the original description, this combination of muriform spores and unadorned perithecia was treated as distinctive within Aspidothelium. The authors said it most closely resembles Aspidothelium geminiparum, but that species has spores divided only by cross-walls (not also by lengthwise walls). They also noted it could be mistaken for Thelenella paraguayensis; however, that species hides its perithecia in wart-like bumps of the thallus and has a branching network of hyphae between the asci that often join, along with spores that have rounder ends.

== Habitat and distribution ==
The species is known from several collections in western Costa Rica. In addition to the type locality (a lowland moist forest zone in partly disturbed primary forest along a stream), it has been collected at Manuel Antonio National Park at sea level, and at Las Cruces Biological Station at about 1,200 m (3,900 ft) elevation, where it was found on the bark of young planted trees, including on a thin trunk of Terminalia amazonica. It was later reported from the Brailiam states Rondônia and Mato Grosso do Sul.
