= Clandestinotrema portoricense =

Scientific classification
- Domain: Eukaryota
- Kingdom: Fungi
- Division: Ascomycota
- Class: Lecanoromycetes
- Order: Graphidales
- Family: Graphidaceae
- Genus: Clandestinotrema
- Species: C. portoricense

Binomial name
- Clandestinotrema portoricense Mercado-Díaz, Lücking & Parnmen (2014)

Species of lichen

Clandestinotrema portoricense is a rare species of corticolous (bark-dwelling) crustose lichen in the family Graphidaceae. Found in Puerto Rico, it was described as a new species in 2014. It is characterised by its white, slightly shiny thallus that can span several centimetres in diameter, and its rounded ascomata that are immersed in the thallus. Unlike most of its genus counterparts, C. portoricense possesses septated (partitioned) spores and a carbonised (blackened) excipulum and columella, effectively distinguishing it from similar species.

== Taxonomy ==
Clandestinotrema portoricense was first formally described by lichenologists Joel Mercado-Díaz, Robert Lücking, and Sittiporn Parnmen. The holotype, the initial specimen that serves as the basis for its description, was discovered by the first author in Canóvanas, Puerto Rico. The species name, portoricense, pays homage to the island of Puerto Rico, the locale of its discovery.

== Description ==
The thallus, or body, of Clandestinotrema portoricense, can span up to 5 cm (2.0 in) in diameter. The thallus, which can be either thinly epiperidermal or partially endoperidermal, is white, slightly shiny, and smooth to uneven in texture. No prothallus is present in this species. The lichen's photobiont, responsible for photosynthesis, is a green alga from genus Trentepohlia, with cells that are rounded to irregular in outline and grouped together in a yellowish-green colour.

What makes this species unique are the ascomata – reproductive structures where spores are produced – that are rounded and immersed with a lateral thalline margin. The ascospores are 3-septate to often somewhat muriform, with an additional, longitudinal septum in the upper segment. They are hyaline, and distoseptate with diamond-shaped lumina.

No substances were detected in this species using thin-layer chromatography.

=== Similar species ===
While most species of Clandestinotrema have regularly (sub-)muriform ascospores, C. portoricense stands out due to its seemingly 3-septate ascospores that may form an additional, longitudinal septum in the thicker proximal segment. This characteristic differentiates it from the other species in the genus, such as C. analorenae, C. maculatum, and C. protoalbum, all of which have regularly 3-septate ascospores. Apart from its unique ascospore septation, Clandestinotrema portoricense also differs in the carbonisation of the excipulum and columella, providing further distinguishing features.

== Habitat and distribution ==
This lichen species was discovered in the shaded understory of a Palo Colorado forest in El Yunque National Forest, Puerto Rico, specifically on the living trunk of an unidentified tree.
