= Mazosia uniseptata =

Scientific classification
- Domain: Eukaryota
- Kingdom: Fungi
- Division: Ascomycota
- Class: Arthoniomycetes
- Order: Arthoniales
- Family: Roccellaceae
- Genus: Mazosia
- Species: M. uniseptata

Binomial name
- Mazosia uniseptata Lücking (2006)

Species of lichen

Mazosia uniseptata is a species of foliicolous (leaf-dwelling) lichen in the family Roccellaceae. First described from French Guiana in 2006, it has since been recorded on shaded understory leaves in seasonally dry lowland forest in neighbouring Guyana, extending its known range across the Guianan Shield. The lichen forms a thin, pale green-grey film sparsely clothed in simple hairs and dotted with minute black apothecia (fruiting bodies) that appear faintly translucent when wet. It is readily distinguished from others in its genus by its eight narrowly spindle-shaped ascospores, each divided by a single septum rather than the multiple septa that typify most Mazosia species.

== Taxonomy ==
The German lichenologist Robert Lücking introduced Mazosia uniseptata in 1995, based on material he collected on understory leaves in the lowland rain-forest near the Nouragues Field Station, French Guiana. The holotype was lodged in the Cayenne herbarium (CAY). In the protologue Lücking contrasted the new taxon with M. pilosa and M. phyllosema, noting that it mimics a depauperate form of the former because of its very sparse pilose covering, and a juvenile thallus of the latter because the short hairs can be overlooked. The decisive character that sets M. uniseptata apart is its small, single-septate ascospore, a feature otherwise seen only in the lichenicolous (parasitic-on-lichens) M. adelphoparasitica. Unlike that parasite, however, M. uniseptata is an autonomous lichen whose apothecia are the only fruit-bodies present on the thallus.

Within Mazosia the species is therefore readily diagnosed by the combination of a thin, finely pilose foliicolous thallus and eight narrowly fusiform spores that are divided by a single cross-wall. Its discovery broadens the morphological range recognised in the genus, indicating that reduced septation in spores evolved at least twice—once in a parasitic lineage and again in a free-living one—and provides another example of Neotropical endemism among leaf-dwelling lichens.

== Description ==
Mazosia uniseptata is a leaf-dwelling (foliicolous) crustose lichen that forms a thin, continuous film 10–20 mm across and only 7–12 micrometres (μm) thick. The thallus appears pale greenish-grey to pale green and has a matt sheen. Minute, simple hairs arise sparsely from the surface; each hair is a single colourless hypha 30–70 μm long and 3–5 μm wide at the base, giving the lichen a barely perceptible pile. The photosynthetic partner is a Phycopeltis alga whose angular-to-rounded cells measure 7–13 μm by 4–6 μm and form irregular plates beneath the fungal layer.

Reproductive bodies (apothecia) are immersed to slightly erupting from the thallus, round, and 0.2–0.4 mm in diameter. Their black discs become faintly translucent when wet, while the gently outward-sloping margin matches the thallus colour. Internally, the excipulum is 15–25 μm thick with paler inner layers; the colourless to pale greenish hypothecium is 10–15 μm high, and the colourless hymenium rises to 50–70 μm. Club-shaped asci (45–65 × 8–12 μm) contain eight fusiform to oblong spores. Each spore is colourless, 10–14 × 3–4 μm, and divided by a single septum that causes only a faint waist. No asexual pycnidia have been observed in this species.

== Habitat and distribution ==
A 1992 survey of foliicolous lichens in the Upper Takutu-Upper Essequibo district of south-western Guyana recovered a specimen referable to Mazosia uniseptata from leaves in the shaded understory of a seasonally dry lowland forest at about 280 m elevation. Although the identification was flagged as tentative, the find broadens the species' known range beyond French Guiana to the neighbouring Guianan Shield forests.

The Guyanese thallus shows slightly altered fruit-body proportions: its black discs are less sharply volcano-shaped and the hymenium reaches only 25–35 μm in height instead of the 50–70 μm reported for the type material. These small deviations suggest that M. uniseptata may display modest morphological plasticity across different microclimates, yet it retains the genus-defining feature of minute, single-septate ascospores.
