= Rhabdodiscus =

Scientific classification
- Domain: Eukaryota
- Kingdom: Fungi
- Division: Ascomycota
- Class: Lecanoromycetes
- Order: Graphidales
- Family: Graphidaceae
- Genus: Rhabdodiscus; Vain. (1921)

Type species
- Rhabdodiscus auberianus (Nyl.) Vain. (1921)

Genus of lichens

Rhabdodiscus is a genus of script lichens in the family Graphidaceae. It has 36 species.

== Taxonomy ==
The genus was circumscribed by Finnish lichenologist Edvard August Vainio in 1921. The species of this genus were previously classified in genus Stegobolus, until molecular phylogenetic analysis showed that Stegobolus and Rhabdodiscus formed two separate, distantly related clades. Rhabdodiscus was formally reinstated in 2012 to contain the formers members of the Stegobolus auberianus species group.

== Description ==
Rhabdodiscus is characterised by having a distinctly carbonized (blackened) apothecia with thin margins that lack a felt-like pruina. In contrast, Stegobolus species have apothecia that are either uncarbonized to weakly carbonized, and have thick margins with felty pruina on the inner side.

== Species ==
As of January 2022, Species Fungorum accepts 36 species of Rhabdodiscus.

- Rhabdodiscus albodenticulatus Weerakoon, Lücking & Lumbsch (2016)
- Rhabdodiscus argentinensis L.I.Ferraro, Aptroot & M.Cáceres (2014)
- Rhabdodiscus asiaticus (Vain.) Rivas Plata, Lücking & Lumbsch (2012)
- Rhabdodiscus bakoensis (Nagarkar & Hale) Rivas Plata, Lücking & Lumbsch (2012)
- Rhabdodiscus caracasanus (Müll.Arg.) Rivas Plata, Lücking & Lumbsch (2012)
- Rhabdodiscus crassoides M.Cáceres, Aptroot & Lücking (2014)
- Rhabdodiscus crassus (Müll.Arg.) Frisch (2012)
- Rhabdodiscus emersellus (Müll.Arg.) Rivas Plata, Lücking & Lumbsch (2012)
- Rhabdodiscus emersus (Kremp.) Rivas Plata, Lücking & Lumbsch (2012)
- Rhabdodiscus exutus (Hale) Kalb & Schumm (2021)
- Rhabdodiscus farinosus Papong, Lücking & Parnmen (2014)
- Rhabdodiscus feigei (Sipman) Rivas Plata, Lücking & Lumbsch (2012)
- Rhabdodiscus granulosus (Tuck.) Rivas Plata, Lücking & Lumbsch (2012)
- Rhabdodiscus inalbescens (Nyl.) Frisch (2016)
- Rhabdodiscus indicus Pushpi Singh & Kr.P.Singh (2013)
- Rhabdodiscus inspersus M.Cáceres, Aptroot & Lücking (2014)
- Rhabdodiscus integer (Müll.Arg.) Rivas Plata, Lücking & Lumbsch (2012)
- Rhabdodiscus isidiatus Weerakoon, Lücking & Lumbsch (2014) – Sri Lanka
- Rhabdodiscus isidiifer (Hale) Rivas Plata, Lücking & Lumbsch (2012)
- Rhabdodiscus kinabalensis (Nagarkar & Hale) Rivas Plata, Lücking & Lumbsch (2012)
- Rhabdodiscus korupensis (Frisch) Rivas Plata, Lücking & Lumbsch (2012)
- Rhabdodiscus lankaensis (Hale) Lücking (2014)
- Rhabdodiscus marivelensis (Vain.) Rivas Plata, Lücking & Lumbsch (2012)
- Rhabdodiscus neocaledonicus Lücking, Lumbsch & Parnmen (2014)
- Rhabdodiscus parnmenianus Weerakoon, Lücking & Lumbsch (2014)
- Rhabdodiscus planus M.Cáceres, Aptroot & Lücking (2014)
- Rhabdodiscus ramificans (Frisch) Rivas Plata, Lücking & Lumbsch (2012)
- Rhabdodiscus reconditus (Stirt.) Rivas Plata, Lücking & Lumbsch (2013)
- Rhabdodiscus saxicola Lücking, Lumbsch & Parnmen (2014)
- Rhabdodiscus schizostomus (Leight.) Rivas Plata, Lücking & Lumbsch (2012)
- Rhabdodiscus subcavatus (Nyl.) Rivas Plata, Lücking & Lumbsch (2012)
- Rhabdodiscus subemersus (Müll.Arg.) Rivas Plata, Lücking & Lumbsch (2012)
- Rhabdodiscus tanzanicus (Frisch) Rivas Plata, Lücking & Lumbsch (2012)
- Rhabdodiscus thouvenotii Lücking, Lumbsch & Parnmen (2014)
- Rhabdodiscus trinitatis Lücking (2015)
- Rhabdodiscus verrucoisidiatus (Nagarkar, Sethy & Patw.) S.Joshi, Upreti & Lücking (2018)
