= Rhabdodiscus isidiatus =

Scientific classification
- Domain: Eukaryota
- Kingdom: Fungi
- Division: Ascomycota
- Class: Lecanoromycetes
- Order: Graphidales
- Family: Graphidaceae
- Genus: Rhabdodiscus
- Species: R. isidiatus

Binomial name
- Rhabdodiscus isidiatus Weerakoon, Lücking & Lumbsch (2014)

Species of lichen

Rhabdodiscus isidiatus is a species of corticolous lichen in the family Graphidaceae. Found in Sri Lanka, it was formally described as a new species in 2014 by lichenologists Gothamie Weerakoon, Robert Lücking, and Helge Thorsten Lumbsch. The type specimen was collected from the Elkaduwa Plantation in Matale (Central Province) at an altitude of 915 m (3,002 ft). The lichen is only known to occur at the type locality, which is a patch of mid-elevation, disturbed montane forest. The specific epithet isidiatus refers to the presence of isidia on the thallus. Rhabdodiscus isidiatus has a cream-colored to white, smooth to uneven thallus up to 5 cm (2 in) in diameter. The ascomata are rounded and prominent, measuring 0.7–1.0 mm in diameter with a 0.3–0.5 mm wide pore and a light brown rim. Its ascospores are hyaline, ellipsoid in shape, contain three thick septa, and measure 12–15 by 5–6 μm. Secondary chemicals present in the lichen include psoromic acid, subpsoromic acid, and 2'-O-demethylpsoromic acid.
