= Clandestinotrema carbonera =

Scientific classification
- Domain: Eukaryota
- Kingdom: Fungi
- Division: Ascomycota
- Class: Lecanoromycetes
- Order: Graphidales
- Family: Graphidaceae
- Genus: Clandestinotrema
- Species: C. carbonera

Binomial name
- Clandestinotrema carbonera I.D.Medeiros (2018)

Species of lichen

Clandestinotrema carbonera is a species of corticolous (bark-dwelling), crustose lichen in the family Graphidaceae. It is found in Venezuela. The lichen is identifiable by its olive-green thallus, dense cortex, lack of a columella, and ascospores measuring 15–24 by 5.5–8.0 μm with 3–5 transverse septa. Additionally, hypostictic acid is present as a major lichen product; stictic acid is a minor substance. Currently, the species has only been found in the type locality, an area of montane cloud forest near Mérida, Venezuela. This habitat, found at an elevation of about 2,300–2,400 m (7,500–7,900 ft), is characteristic of Clandestinotrema species.

== Taxonomy ==
The lichen was formally described as a new species in 2018 by Ian Medeiros. The species epithet refers to the type locality – El Bosque La Carbonera-San Eusebio in the Venezuelan Andes. The species had previously been mentioned by lichenologist Mason Hale in a 1978 publication (as a species of Thelotrema), but he did not describe it formally. This was the first reported instance of hypostictic acid isolated from a lichen.

== Description ==
Clandestinotrema carbonera forms a thin, bark-dwelling thallus (the main body of the lichen) that lies just above the host's epidermis. The surface is smooth and olive-green, measuring 40–100 μm in total thickness. Beneath the outer cortex (a densely woven layer of fungal cells 10–30 μm thick) lies the photobiont layer, about 30–75 μm deep, where the green algal partner Trentepohlia resides; below this is a thin, indistinct medulla (an inner fungal layer). There is no visible prothallus (the thin fungal growth margin sometimes seen in other lichens), and the thallus contains no obvious mineral crystals.

Reproductive structures (ascomata) appear as small, rounded, immersed fruiting bodies 0.3–0.4 mm across, each with a complete thalline margin (a rim made of thallus tissue). The upper surface of each ascoma has a tiny round pore, 0.03–0.06 mm wide, through which spores are released. Internally, the excipulum (the layer immediately surrounding the spore-bearing tissue) is 20–35 μm wide and shows two zones: an upper, carbon-rich half and a yellow-brown lower half, both enclosed by a thin layer of thallus. There is no columella (a central sterile column sometimes found in related species), and the hypothecium (the tissue below the spore-bearing layer) is a clear, prosoplectenchymatous tissue about 15–20 μm high. The hymenium (the spore-bearing layer) reaches 75–90 μm in height and is clear, while the epithecium (its roof) is faintly grey, about 4–6 μm thick. Sterile filaments (paraphyses) are unbranched and smooth-tipped, and no periphysoids (specialised filaments) are present.

Each ascus (sac) is club-shaped, 75–90 × 10–15 μm, and contains eight ellipsoid ascospores arranged in a single row (uniseriate). The spores measure 15–24 × 5.5–8.0 μm and have three to five transverse septa (cross-walls), with occasional longitudinal septation in one cell. They are thick-walled, clear (hyaline), and show diamond-shaped internal cavities (lumina). Conidiomata (asexual reproductive structures) have not been observed. Chemical analysis by thin-layer chromatography indicates hypostictic acid as the major product and stictic acid in lesser amounts; trace levels of hyposalazinic and cryptostictic acids were reported by an earlier study but were not reconfirmed in the most recent analysis.

== Habitat and distribution ==
At the time of its original publication, Clandestinotrema carbonera was known only from its type collection, which was made on tree bark in a montane cloud forest near Mérida, Venezuela, at approximately 2300–2400 m elevation. This high-elevation cloud-forest habitat is typical of Clandestinotrema species, which are most often found in tropical montane and cloud forests. In the Neotropics, cloud forests represent key environments for lichen diversity and endemism, harbouring many specialised taxa.
