= Thelotrema fijiense =

Scientific classification
- Kingdom: Fungi
- Division: Ascomycota
- Class: Lecanoromycetes
- Order: Graphidales
- Family: Graphidaceae
- Genus: Thelotrema
- Species: T. fijiense

Binomial name
- Thelotrema fijiense Lumbsch, Lücking & Naikatini (2011)
- Holotype site: Taveuni Island, Fiji

Species of lichen

Thelotrema fijiense is a little-known species of corticolous (bark-dwelling), crustose lichen in the family Graphidaceae. It is known from Fiji.

== Taxonomy ==
The lichen was described as new to science in 2011 by the lichenologists Helge Thorsten Lumbsch, Robert Lücking, and Alifereti Naikatini. The type specimen by the first author on the access road to the summit of Devo Peak on Taveuni Island. The species epithet fijiense refs to its type locality.

== Description ==
Thelotrema fijiense has a thallus that is either epiphloedal or hypophloedal, thin, and varies in colour from whitish grey to pale olive or brown around the ascomata (fruiting bodies). The surface of the thallus can be either dull or shiny and is smooth and continuous, with a discontinuous protocortex up to 20 μm thick. The algal layer of the thallus is continuous, featuring sparse, small crystals. This species does not make vegetative propagules such as isidia or soredia.

The ascomata of Thelotrema fijiense are roundish, measuring 0.2–0.4 mm in diameter, and appear either solitary or occasionally fused at the margins, with a semi-emergent to emergent, flattened-hemispherical shape. The disc of the ascomata may become partly visible, with a greyish to pale flesh-coloured hue and is slightly pruinose. The pores are small, up to 0.25 μm in diameter, and range from roundish to slightly irregular. The proper exciple is visible from the surface, and is whitish to off-white, and incurved. The thalline margin of the lichen is thin, widening or occasionally gaping with age, olive-brown to brown in colour, and usually roundish to irregularly roundish with an entire edge. The proper exciple becomes free, at least in part, and is hyaline (translucent) to pale yellowish internally, with a yellowish-brown marginal area that is amyloid at the base. The hymenium is up to 140 μm high, clear, and conglutinated with moderately interwoven paraphyses that are unbranched to slightly branched, with slightly thickened tips. Lateral paraphyses are inconspicuous and up to 30 μm long, but no columellar structures are present. The epihymenium is hyaline to brown and granulose.

Asci in this species are eight-spored with a thick tholus that narrows at maturity. The ascospores are transversely septate with thick, smooth, non-halonate, and hyaline cell walls that turn brown at maturity. They are fusiform in shape, with ends that are roundish to acute, and loci that are angular to roundish, measuring 19–27 by 5–7 μm with 9 septa (sometimes as few as 7, or as many as 9). Pycnidia have not been observed in this species, and high-performance thin-layer chromatography indicates the absence of any secondary substances (all spot tests are negative).

== Habitat and distribution ==
Thelotrema fijiense has been identified solely from its type location on Taveuni Island in Fiji. It is found growing on twigs within a cloud forest, at an elevation of 800 m (2,600 ft).
