= Thelotrema nostalgicum =

Scientific classification
- Kingdom: Fungi
- Division: Ascomycota
- Class: Lecanoromycetes
- Order: Graphidales
- Family: Graphidaceae
- Genus: Thelotrema
- Species: T. nostalgicum

Binomial name
- Thelotrema nostalgicum G.Salisb. (1972)

Species of lichen-forming fungus

Thelotrema nostalgicum is a species of corticolous (bark-dwelling) lichen in the family Graphidaceae. It has a pale, shiny thallus and hemispherical fruiting bodies with colourless, highly segmented ascospores. It was described from bark-growing material collected in Sri Lanka (then Ceylon) and is known only from that country.

== Taxonomy ==
Thelotrema nostalgicum was described as a new species by the British lichenologist George Salisbury in 1972, in a revision of Thelotrema sect. Thelotrema (specifically the T. lepadinum group). The holotype was collected on bark at Pidurutalagala (historically recorded as "Pedrotallegalle") in Ceylon in 1879 by Almquist and is preserved in the Nylander herbarium at H (herb. Nyl. 22741). Salisbury noted that Nylander had earlier placed the type specimen under Thelotrema dolichotatum, but considered it distinct and stated that T. dolichotatum belongs to the T. cavatum group (with a carbonaceous excipulum and a cylindrical columella); Thelotrema cavatum is now known as Ocellularia cavata. In Salisbury's arrangement, T. nostalgicum was included in the T. lepadinum group and has colourless, septate spores (an "Ocellularia-type" spore).

== Description ==
The thallus of Thelotrema nostalgicum is pale ochraceous and slightly shiny, 60–140 micrometres (μm) thick, with a somewhat cartilaginous cortex about 15 μm thick; crystals were reported between the hyphae, and the algal partner was identified as Trentepohlia. The fruiting bodies (apothecia) are hemispherical and frequent (about 24 per cm^{2}), 0.6–0.7 mm across, each with a small, pore-like opening up to about 0.1 mm wide and an incurved thalline margin. The excipulum is colourless and detached (about 20 μm thick) and bears periphyses on the inner face; the hymenium is 220–240 μm tall, and the ascospores are colourless, oblong-fusiform, and 27–34-septate, typically 2–3 (sometimes 1 or 4) per ascus, measuring 120–215 × 20–27 μm, with a purple iodine staining reaction.

== Habitat and distribution ==
The type collection was collected on bark at Pidurutalagala in Ceylon, and Salisbury reported the species only from Ceylon (Sri Lanka).
