= Platygramme lueckingii =

Scientific classification
- Domain: Eukaryota
- Kingdom: Fungi
- Division: Ascomycota
- Class: Lecanoromycetes
- Order: Graphidales
- Family: Graphidaceae
- Genus: Platygramme
- Species: P. lueckingii

Binomial name
- Platygramme lueckingii Z.F.Jia & Kalb (2012)

Species of lichen

Platygramme lueckingii is a species of script lichen in the family Graphidaceae. It is found in Hainan Island in tropical China, where it grows on bark.

== Taxonomy ==
The lichen was formally described as a new species in 2012 by Ze-Feng Jia and Klaus Kalb. The type specimen was collected from Mt. Jianfengling (Hainan) at an altitude of 740 m (2,430 ft). It is only known to occur in the type locality, which has a tropical climate. The species epithet honours German lichenologist and colleague Robert Lücking, "for his many contributions to the knowledge of Graphidaceae".

== Description ==
The lichen has a thin, yellowish-green to greenish thallus that is tightly attached to its bark substrate. It has black, lirellate apothecia that are 1–5 mm long and 0.3–0.4 mm wide. The proper exciple is wedge-shaped at its apex, and is carbonised. The hypothecium is brownish and measures 8–15 μm high. Its asci are cylindrical and two-spored, measuring 90–110 by 13–25 μm. Its ascospores are oblong to ellipsoid in shape, muriform (with 8–9 by 1–3 internal locules) and dimensions of 35–45 by 110–155 μm. No lichen products were detected in Platygramme lueckingii. Platygramme hainanensis is similar in morphology and appearance (also found on Hainan Island), but this lichen does not have two-spored asci.
