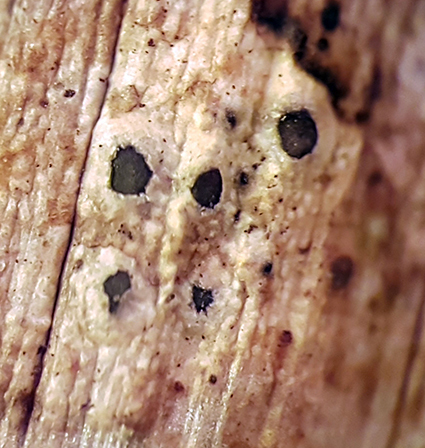
- Mazosia melanophthalma

Scientific classification
- Domain: Eukaryota
- Kingdom: Fungi
- Division: Ascomycota
- Class: Arthoniomycetes
- Order: Arthoniales
- Family: Roccellaceae
- Genus: Mazosia; A.Massal. (1854)

Type species
- Mazosia rotula (Mont.) A.Massal. (1854)

Species
- See text

Synonyms
- Chiodecton subgen. Rotularia Vain. (1921); Gomphospora A.Massal. (1852); Gymnographoidea Fink (1930); Micrographina Fink (1930); Opegrapha sect. Rotula Müll.Arg. (1883); Rotula (Müll.Arg.) Müll.Arg. (1890); Rotularia (Vain.) Zahlbr. (1923)

= Mazosia =

Genus of lichens

Mazosia is a genus of lichen-forming fungi in the family Roccellaceae.

== Taxonomy ==
The genus was circumscribed by Italian lichenologist Abramo Bartolommeo Massalongo in 1854.

== Description ==
Mazosia is a genus of crustose lichens, meaning it forms a thin, crust-like layer that adheres tightly to the surface it grows on. The thallus (lichen body) lacks a protective outer cortex and may sometimes have hair-like extensions on the upper surface. The photosynthetic partner, or photobiont, is typically from the genus Trentepohlia, with cells that are round to oval (7–17 μm wide) and either occur singly or form short chains. In some cases, the photobiont can be from the genus Phycopeltis, which has rectangular to rhomboid cells (12–20 by 6–12 μm) arranged in radiating plates.

The reproductive structures, called apothecia, are generally round and have a layered margin, known as a zeorine structure. This margin consists of three layers: an inner proper exciple (the true margin of the apothecia), an outer thalline margin (derived from the lichen body), and a middle layer of rhomboid crystals (5–10 μm wide) that do not dissolve when treated with potassium hydroxide solution (K). The disc of the apothecia is greyish-black to black and exposed.

In cross-section, the proper exciple has a cup-like shape and is made of vertically oriented hyphae (fungal filaments) that are 3–6 μm thick, red-brown to carbonised (blackened) in colour, and turn olive-green when treated with K. The layer beneath the hymenium, or hypothecium, is pale brown to colourless. The hymenium (the spore-producing layer) is clear, not filled with oil droplets, and shows a faint blue reaction when treated with iodine-based stain (hemiamyloid).

The asci (spore sacs) are cylindrical to club-shaped, usually containing eight spores. They resemble the vulgata-type asci, where the walls and central structure (tholus) are not amyloid (do not react to iodine), except for a small amyloid ring. The paraphysoids, which are filamentous structures surrounding the asci, are richly branched and connected, often extending well above the height of the asci without swollen or pigmented tips.

The ascospores are colourless, elongated (ellipsoid to spindle-shaped), and divided by 3–7 internal walls (septate). One central compartment is usually larger than the others. Mazosia also produces asexual spores in structures called pycnidia, which can be either embedded within the thallus or slightly protruding. There are two types of asexual spores: larger, oblong to rod-shaped spores (macroconidia) and smaller, spindle-shaped spores (microconidia).

Chemically, Mazosia species typically lack detectable secondary metabolites (lichen products), although some species contain the compound psoromic acid.

== Species ==
- Mazosia aptrootii Sipman (1991)
- Mazosia bambusae (Vain.) R.Sant. (1952)
- Mazosia bruguierae A.Sakata & H.Harada (2017) – Japan
- Mazosia carnea (Eckfeldt) Aptroot & M.Cáceres (2014)
- Mazosia endonigra M.Cáceres & Aptroot (2014)
- Mazosia flavida Aptroot (2022) – Brazil
- Mazosia japonica A.Sakata & H.Harada (2017) – Japan
- Mazosia leptosticta (Nyl.) Sparrius (2004)
- Mazosia lueckingii Kr.P.Singh & Pinokiyo (2008) – India
- Mazosia melanophthalma (Müll.Arg.) R.Sant. (1952)
- Mazosia paupercula (Müll.Arg.) R.Sant. (1952)
- Mazosia phyllosema (Nyl.) Zahlbr. (1923)
- Mazosia quadriseptata Kalb & Vězda (1994)
- Mazosia rotula (Mont.) A.Massal. (1854)
- Mazosia tomentifera Vězda & Lumbsch (1990)
- Mazosia uniseptata Lücking (2006)
- Mazosia viridescens (Fée) Aptroot & M.Cáceres (2014)
