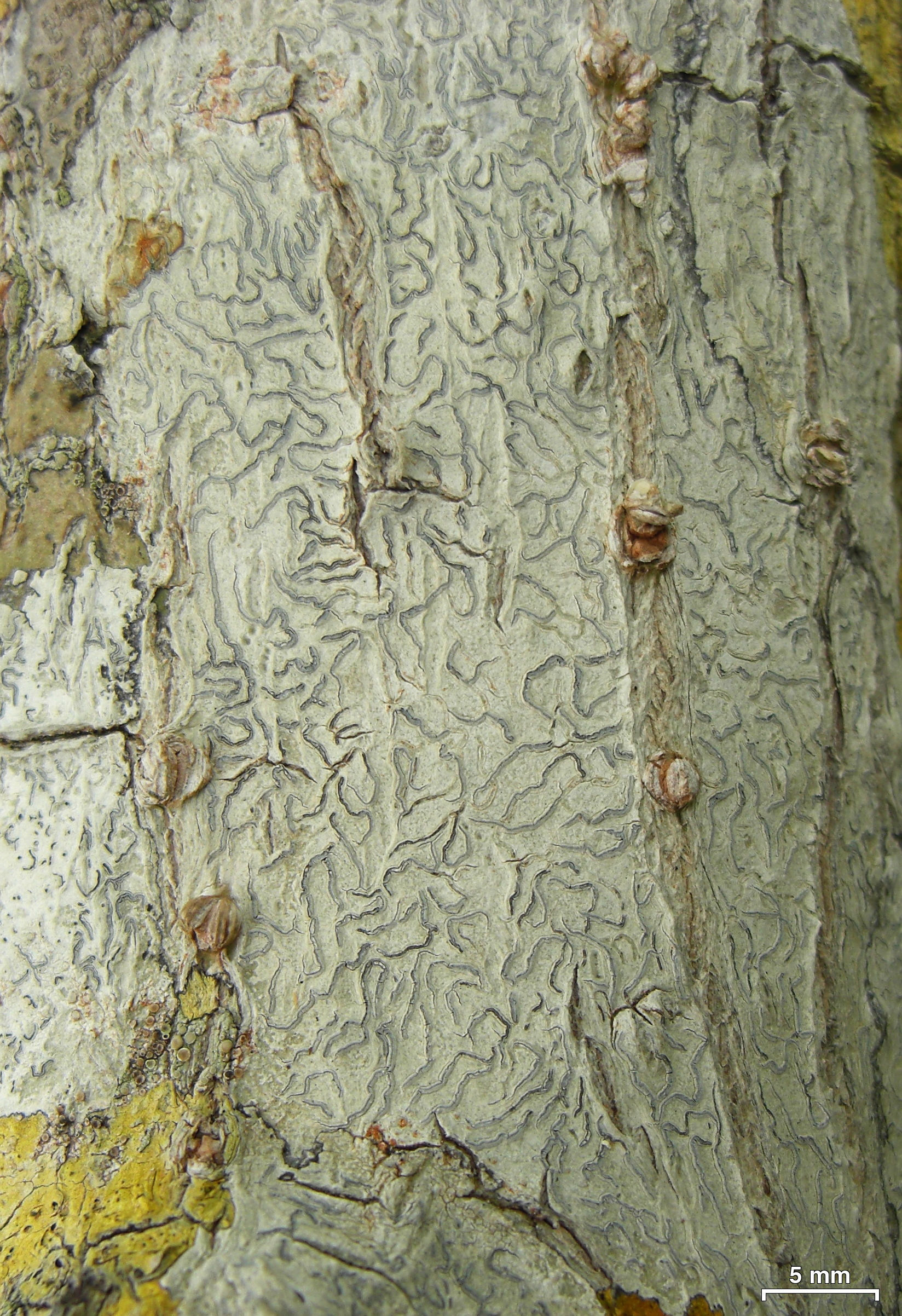
- Platygramme pachnodes

Scientific classification
- Kingdom: Fungi
- Division: Ascomycota
- Class: Lecanoromycetes
- Order: Graphidales
- Family: Graphidaceae
- Genus: Platygramme; Fée (1874)

Type species
- Platygramme caesiopruinosa (Fée) Fée (1874)

= Platygramme =

Genus of lichen-forming fungi

Platygramme is a genus of lichen-forming fungi in the family Graphidaceae consisting of about 27 species. The genus was circumscribed by Antoine Laurent Apollinaire Fée in 1874. The type species of the genus is P. caesiopruinosa. These bark-dwelling lichens are found in moist, shaded forests across tropical and warm temperate regions worldwide, where they form pale crusts that develop distinctive flattened, plate-like fruiting structures. A combination of several features characterizes Platygramme: the brown ascospores, a spore-producing layer (hymenium) speckled with granules, and elongated fruiting bodies (lirellae) with distinctive plate-like structures formed from hardened tissue.

== Description ==
Platygramme forms a smooth, pale grey-green to yellow-olive crust (thallus) that sits flush with the bark and lacks a true cortex. Its fruit bodies start as narrow lirellae but soon split their thalline cover and expand sideways into plate-like discs; viewed from above they look more like flattened shields than slits. A colourless to faintly brown excipulum lines the disc, and the exposed surface may carry a thin whitish pruina. The clear hymenium is non-inspersed, while the thin-walled, Graphis-type asci usually contain eight hyaline ascospores that become distinctly muriform—divided by a lattice of transverse and longitudinal septa—yet remain iodine-negative (I–). Most species are chemically inert or produce only traces of stictic acid-series depsidones.

The plate-forming discs separate Platygramme from script lichens with permanent slits such as Glyphis and Hemithecium. Unlike Chapsa, whose discs are star-shaped with radiating lobules, Platygramme displays entire, rounded plates; and in contrast to Kalbographa, it lacks vividly coloured anthraquinone pigments and its margins remain pale or only lightly carbonised (blackened).

== Habitat and distribution ==
The genus is pantropical to warm-temperate in distribution. All known species are bark-dwelling (corticolous), occupying shaded boles and large branches in moist evergreen forests from lowland Amazonia and West-Central Africa to Southeast Asia and northern Australia. Although tolerant of brief sunflecks, they disappear quickly when canopy cover is removed; their presence therefore signals long-established, relatively undisturbed woodland with high ambient humidity.

== Species ==
As of June 2025, Species Fungorum (as listed in the Catalogue of Life) accepts 27 species of Platygramme.

- Platygramme arechavaletae (Müll.Arg.) A.W.Archer (2005)
- Platygramme australiensis Staiger (2002)
- Platygramme coccinea Seavey & J.Seavey (2014)
- Platygramme colubrosa (Nyl.) Staiger (2002)
- Platygramme commutabilis (Kremp.) A.W.Archer (2009)
- Platygramme computata (Kremp.) A.W.Archer (2007)
- Platygramme discurrens (Nyl.) Staiger (2002)
- Platygramme elaeoplaca (Zahlbr.) Z.F.Jia & Lücking (2017)
- Platygramme elegantula Seavey & J.Seavey (2017)
- Platygramme fuscescens A.W.Archer (2005) – Australia
- Platygramme hainanensis Z.F.Jia & Kalb (2012) – China
- Platygramme impudica (A.W.Archer) A.W.Archer (2005)
- Platygramme kaalensis (Tuck.) Luch & Lücking (2018)
- Platygramme lueckingii Z.F.Jia & Kalb (2012) – China
- Platygramme microspora Sutjar. & Kalb (2014)
- Platygramme muelleri (A.W.Archer) Staiger (2002)
- Platygramme pachyspora (Redinger) Staiger (2002)
- Platygramme pachnodes (Fée) Fée (1874)
- Platygramme platyloma (Müll.Arg.) M.Nakan. & Kashiw. (2003)
- Platygramme praestans (Müll.Arg.) Staiger (2002)
- Platygramme pseudomontagnei (M.Nakan.) M.Nakan. & Kashiw. (2003)
- Platygramme pudica (Mont. & Bosch) M.Nakan. & Kashiw. (2003)
- Platygramme subarechavaletae Poengs. & Kalb (2014) – Thailand
- Platygramme subcolubrosa J.Kalb & Kalb (2017) – Thailand
- Platygramme taiwanensis (J.C.Wei) Z.F.Jia & Lücking (2017)
- Platygramme tumulata (Nyl.) Luch & Lücking (2018)
- Platygramme unirana M.Cáceres, Aptroot & Lücking (2014) – Brazil
- Platygramme wattiana (Müll.Arg.) V.P.Tewari & Upreti (2008)
