= Mazosia lueckingii =

Scientific classification
- Domain: Eukaryota
- Kingdom: Fungi
- Division: Ascomycota
- Class: Arthoniomycetes
- Order: Arthoniales
- Family: Roccellaceae
- Genus: Mazosia
- Species: M. lueckingii

Binomial name
- Mazosia lueckingii Kr.P.Singh & Pinokiyo (2008)

Species of lichen

Mazosia lueckingii is a species of foliicolous (leaf-dwelling) lichen in the family Roccellaceae. It is found in India. This lichen forms thin, greyish-brown to yellowish-brown crusts on dicotyledon leaves, with a surface covered in small brown wart-like bumps filled with colourless crystals and minute black reproductive discs that sit flush with the surface. Described as new to science in 2008, it is distinguished by its crystal-filled verrucae, dark hypothallus, and relatively large spores divided by 4–5 cross-walls.

== Taxonomy ==
The lichen was formally described as a new species in 2008 by Krishna Pal Singh and Athokpam Pinokiyo. The type specimen was collected by the first author in the Darjeeling district (West Bengal) at an altitude of 1,200 m (3,900 ft), where it was found growing on dicotyledon leaves. The lichen has a verrucose (warty) thallus with brown, hairless verrucae, a black hypothallus, and ascospores that measure 34–45 by 4–7 μm with 4 or five septa. The specific epithet lueckingii honours the German-born lichenologist Robert Lücking, who, according to the authors, "has made remarkable contributions to the taxonomy and ecology of foliicolous lichens".

== Description ==
Mazosia lueckingii forms a thin, leaf-dwelling crust that appears light greyish-brown to yellowish-brown. The thallus spreads in roughly circular or patchy colonies 4–8 mm across but is only 18–30 μm thick. Its surface is covered in small, brown wart-like bumps (verrucae) 100–135 μm wide; each bump is packed with colourless crystals 8–15 μm across and capped by a mat of brown fungal threads. A narrow, dark-brown hypothallus fringes the colony, and the photosynthetic partner is a Phycopeltis green alga whose rounded or rectangular cells measure 8–12 × 3–4 μm.

The reproductive bodies are minute ascostromata that remain largely buried in the thallus. When mature, only a 0.2–0.4 mm black disc becomes visible, sitting flush with the surface. A thin brown margin surrounds each disc, while the lateral wall (excipuloid tissue) slopes gently downward and is overlain by a colourless crystal layer and a thin sheath of thallus tissue. Internally, a pale to faded-brown hypothecioid layer (8–15 μm thick) supports a clear hymenium 70–80 μm tall. Club-shaped asci (60–70 × 19–25 μm) contain eight spindle-shaped ascospores. Each spore is colourless, 34–45 × 4–7 μm, divided by three to five cross-walls (septa) that do not cause any narrowing, and the end cells are slightly tapered.

The species is distinguished by the combination of brown crystal-filled verrucae, a dark hypothallus, and partly exposed apothecia producing relatively large 4–5-septate spores. These features set it apart from similar foliicolous Mazosia species that have paler warts, fewer septa, or spores that constrict at the septum.

== Habitat and distribution ==
Mazosia lueckingii is known only from its type and paratype collections, both made in the Darjeeling district of West Bengal, India. These specimens were gathered on dicotyledonous leaves at roughly 1,200 m elevation in the subtropical eastern Himalaya. Within that montane setting the lichen is strictly foliicolous, forming minute, brown-verruculose colonies on the living leaves of understory shrubs. It occupies the persistently humid microclimate of subtropical hill forest and is part of a characteristic epiphyllous community that also includes Byssoloma leucoblepharum, Gyalectidium filicinum and Echinoplaca streimannii. Mazosia lueckingii is one seven Mazosia species known to occur in the Eastern Himalayas biodiversity hotspot region.
