= Compositrema thailandicum =

Scientific classification
- Kingdom: Fungi
- Division: Ascomycota
- Class: Lecanoromycetes
- Order: Graphidales
- Family: Graphidaceae
- Genus: Compositrema
- Species: C. thailandicum

Binomial name
- Compositrema thailandicum Rivas Plata, Papong & Lumbsch (2012)

Species of lichen

Compositrema thailandicum is a species of corticolous (bark-dwelling) lichen in the family Graphidaceae. Found in tropical Thailand, it was described as a new species in 2012. The lichen is distinguished by its unique physical characteristics and its notable similarities to, and differences from, other species within the same family.

== Taxonomy ==
Compositrema thailandicum was first described scientifically by lichenologists Eimy Rivas Plata, Papong, and H. Thorsten Lumbsch. The holotype (the original specimen that the description is based on) was discovered near the Hep Su waterfall in Pha Klua Mai, (Pak Chong district) Thailand, at an altitude of 700 m (2,300 ft). The species name thailandicum refers to the country of its initial discovery.

== Description ==
Compositrema thailandicum presents with a pale green-grey to olive-green thallus, or body, which can be smooth or uneven. Its cortex is densely packed with a type of tissue known as prosoplectenchyma. The photobiont layer, which houses the photosynthesising organisms, contains clusters of calcium oxalate crystals. The pseudostromata, formations of spore-producing structures, are noticeable and vary between angular and rounded shapes, reaching 0.5–1.0 mm in diameter. These structures are composed of 3–7 individual apothecia, each measuring 0.1–0.3 mm in diameter. The apothecia lack a columella, a feature present in many related species. The ascospores of this lichen contain three septa, are colourless, and measure 10–13 by 4.5–5.5 μm. The presence of psoromic acid, a lichen product that reacts to give a yellow colour when tested with the P spot test, is another characteristic of this species.

Compositrema thailandicum can be distinguished from its close relative, Compositrema cerebriforme, by its hyaline or clear ascospores, and the less pronounced pseudostromatic ascomata. It is also noteworthy that isidia, tiny outgrowths found in some lichens, have not been found in Compositrema thailandicum.

Compositrema thailandicum may be initially mistaken for Stegobolus anamorphus, due to their similar appearance. However, molecular analysis has revealed a significant genetic difference, placing Compositrema thailandicum in a separate clade along with the Venezuelan species Compositrema cerebriforme. This distinction was further confirmed by observing the pseudostromatic nature of the ascomata, a feature that sets it apart from Stegobolus anamorphus. Despite these differences, the morphological similarities between the two species remain subtle but distinct.
