= Natural History Museum and Institute, Chiba =

Museum in Chiba, Japan

- 千葉県立中央博物館
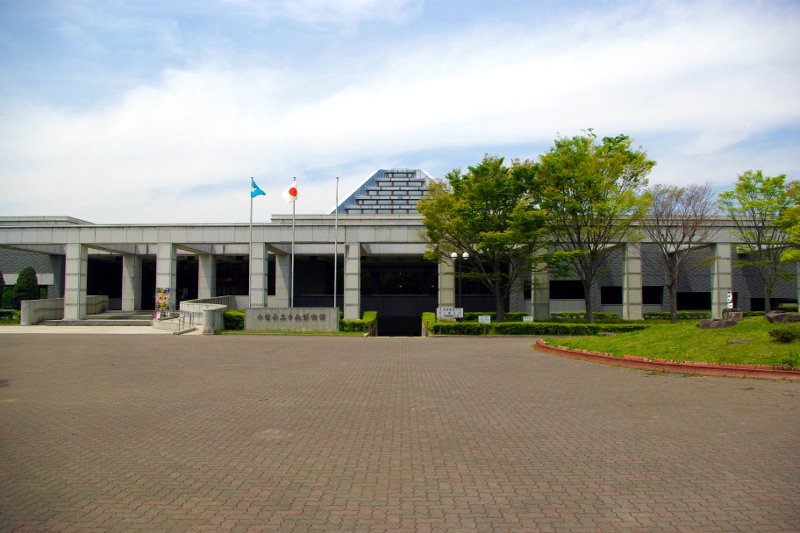
- Interactive map of the Natural History Museum and Institute, Chiba area

General information
- Location: 955-2 Aoba-chō,Chūō-ku, Chiba, Chiba Prefecture, Japan
- Coordinates: 35°35′59″N 140°08′18″E
- Opened: February 1989

Website
- Official website

The Natural History Museum and Institute, Chiba (千葉県立中央博物館, Chiba Kenritsu Chūō Hakubutsukan) is a prefectural museum in Chūō-ku, Chiba, Chiba Prefecture, Japan. The museum opened in 1989 with a focus on the natural history and history of the Bōsō Peninsula.

== See also ==
- List of Historic Sites of Japan (Chiba)
- Chiba Prefectural Museum of Art
