= Thelotrema lueckingii =

Scientific classification
- Domain: Eukaryota
- Kingdom: Fungi
- Division: Ascomycota
- Class: Lecanoromycetes
- Order: Graphidales
- Family: Graphidaceae
- Genus: Thelotrema
- Species: T. lueckingii

Binomial name
- Thelotrema lueckingii Breuss (2013)

Species of lichen

Thelotrema lueckingii is a species of corticolous (bark-dwelling) crustose lichen in the family Graphidaceae. Found in the laurel forests of Madeira, it was formally described as a new species in 2013 by Othmar Breuss. The species epithet honours German lichenologist Robert Lücking.

The lichen has a thick, yellowish-white to greyish-green thallus with a roughened to uneven surface texture. The medulla is white to yellowish. The apothecia, which are immersed in thalline warts, are up to 2 mm in diameter with an ostiole up to 0.5 mm wide. Ascospores number 2 or 4 per ascus (sometimes 6); they are fusiform (spindle-shaped) and muriform, measuring 55–110 by 15–28 μm.
