= Aspidothelium lueckingii =

Scientific classification
- Domain: Eukaryota
- Kingdom: Fungi
- Division: Ascomycota
- Class: Lecanoromycetes
- Order: Thelenellales
- Family: Thelenellaceae
- Genus: Aspidothelium
- Species: A. lueckingii

Binomial name
- Aspidothelium lueckingii Flakus (2009)

Species of lichen

Aspidothelium lueckingii is a species of corticolous (bark-dwelling) lichen in the family Thelenellaceae. Found in mountainous cloud forests in Bolivia, it was formally described in 2009 by lichenologist Adam Flakus. The type specimen was collected near Incachaca village (Chapare Province) at an elevation of 2,317 m (7,602 ft), where it was found growing on the bark of a pine tree. It is known only from the type locality. It is named in honour of German lichenologist Robert Lücking, "for his magnificent contribution to the knowledge of tropical lichens".

== Description ==
Characteristics of the lichen include its pale perithecia with seta-like appendages and large, regularly muriform ascospores. Aspidothelium lueckingii has a thin and smooth, green to greyish-green thallus with an irregular shape and a translucent, indistinct prothallus. It has a chlorococcoid photobiont partner, with green cells measuring 6–14 μm in diameter.
