= Platygramme subarechavaletae =

Scientific classification
- Domain: Eukaryota
- Kingdom: Fungi
- Division: Ascomycota
- Class: Lecanoromycetes
- Order: Graphidales
- Family: Graphidaceae
- Genus: Platygramme
- Species: P. subarechavaletae

Binomial name
- Platygramme subarechavaletae Poengs. & Kalb (2014)

Species of lichen

Platygramme subarechavaletae is a species of script lichen in the family Graphidaceae. Found in Thailand, it was formally described as a new species in 2014 by lichenologists Vasun Poengsungnoen and Klaus Kalb. The type specimen was collected by the first author from the Phu Luang Wildlife Sanctuary (Loei) at an elevation of 1,468 m (4,816 ft), there it was found growing on an unidentified tree in a lower montane scrub. The lichen has a grey to yellowish-green thallus with a smooth and dull surface. The species epithet alludes to its resemblance to Platygramme arechavaletae.
