= Kalbographa lueckingii =

Scientific classification
- Domain: Eukaryota
- Kingdom: Fungi
- Division: Ascomycota
- Class: Lecanoromycetes
- Order: Graphidales
- Family: Graphidaceae
- Genus: Kalbographa
- Species: K. lueckingii

Binomial name
- Kalbographa lueckingii Kalb (2009)

Species of lichen

Kalbographa lueckingii is a species of corticolous (bark-dwelling), crustose lichen in the family Graphidaceae. Found in southeastern Brazil, it was formally described as a new species in 2009 by Klaus Kalb. The type specimen was collected between Taubaté and Ubatuba (in the Serra do Mar) at an elevation of 800 m (2,600 ft); there, in a more or less virgin tropical rainforest, it was found growing on the smooth bark of an old deciduous tree in the shade. It is only known from the type collection. The species epithet honours lichenologist Robert Lücking, "for his outstanding contributions to tropical lichenology".

The lichen has a smooth, pale olive-green thallus. It contains stictic acid as a major lichen product, and minor amounts of constictic acid.
