= Compositrema cerebriforme =

Scientific classification
- Domain: Eukaryota
- Kingdom: Fungi
- Division: Ascomycota
- Class: Lecanoromycetes
- Order: Graphidales
- Family: Graphidaceae
- Genus: Compositrema
- Species: C. cerebriforme

Binomial name
- Compositrema cerebriforme J.E.Hern. & Lücking (2012)

Species of lichen

Compositrema cerebriforme is a species of corticolous (bark-dwelling) lichen in the family Graphidaceae. It is notable for its distinct structure and resemblance to the shape of a brain. It was discovered in the greenery of Venezuela's Henri Pittier National Park, and described as a new species in 2012.

== Taxonomy ==
The formal description of Compositrema cerebriforme was published in 2012 by lichenologists Jesús Ernesto Hernández Maldonado and Robert Lücking. The specimen that formed the basis for this description, referred to as the holotype, was discovered in the Henri Pittier National Park in Aragua, Venezuela. The name of the species, cerebriforme, alludes to its striking resemblance to a brain, especially in its younger stages. Its pseudostromatic ascomata, a defining feature of the species, are distinctly different from those of Stegobolus tanzanicus, a related lichen species. Compositrema cerebriforme is the type species of genus Compositrema.

== Description ==
The physical appearance of Compositrema cerebriforme is characterised by a pale green-grey thallus, or body, which possesses an uneven, robust surface. Tiny, upright structures known as isidia, often found in clusters, are commonly observed on the thallus, their lengths varying between 0.5 and 1.0 mm, while thickness ranges from 0.1 to 0.2 mm. The photobiont layer of this lichen species contains clusters of calcium oxalate crystals, a trait not uncommon in lichen species.

The pseudostromata, an assemblage of reproductive structures, are another distinctive feature of Compositrema cerebriforme. These start as dome-like, brain-shaped structures, which eventually flatten and become level with the thallus. Each pseudostroma can reach up to 2.0 mm in diameter and is often covered with an assortment of small, irregular scales, which are a blend of hyphae and crystals. These scales then gradually separate, revealing the apothecial discs.

The apothecia, or spore-producing structures, of Compositrema cerebriforme are singular in their design, being entirely devoid of a columella, a common feature in many related species. Additionally, the ascospores of this species, measuring 10–13 by 4–5 μm, are pale brown, contain three septa, and possess lens-shaped lumina, further distinguishing it from its relatives. The presence of psoromic acid, a lichen product that gives a yellow reaction when tested with the P spot test, is another trait that helps in identifying this species.
