= Mazosia flavida =

Scientific classification
- Kingdom: Fungi
- Division: Ascomycota
- Class: Arthoniomycetes
- Order: Arthoniales
- Family: Roccellaceae
- Genus: Mazosia
- Species: M. flavida

Binomial name
- Mazosia flavida Aptroot (2022)

Species of lichen-forming fungus

Mazosia flavida is a foliicolous (leaf-dwelling) lichen in the family Roccellaceae. It forms a dull, olive-green crust on living leaves in old-growth rainforest in the Reserva Cristalino region of Mato Grosso, Brazil. The species is distinguished by its cylindrical ascospores with nine septa (cross-walls) that soon break into segments, and by a pale yellow pigment in the thallus and along the margins of its ascomata (fruiting bodies).

== Taxonomy ==
Mazosia flavida was described in 2022 by André Aptroot from material collected on living leaves in old-growth rainforest in the Reserva Cristalino, Mato Grosso, Brazil, at an elevation of 250 to 350 m (820 to 1,150 ft). The holotype specimen (A. Aptroot 83167) is deposited in the herbarium of the Federal University of Mato Grosso do Sul (CGMS). Within Mazosia, it differs from similar species by its cylindrical ascospores with 9 septa, measuring 46–52 μm long and 3.5–4.5 μm wide, which soon fragment, and by the pale yellow pigment in the medulla of the thallus verrucae (small protuberances) and the margin of the apothecia. In an key to foliicolous neotropical Mazosia species, it falls in the option for species with 9-septate ascospores and a pale yellow medulla in both the thallus verrucae and the apothecial margin.

== Description ==
The thallus is a continuous, crustose film with a cortex, dull olive-green in color, up to about 1 cm (0.4 in) in diameter and less than 0.05 mm thick. It is not surrounded by a prothallus. It has yellowish dots that are ellipsoid and radially arranged, about 0.05 × 0.025 mm in size and spaced roughly 0.1 mm apart. The medulla of these dots is pale yellow. The photobiont is trentepohlioid (a Trentepohlia-type green alga). The ascomata (fruiting bodies) are solitary and sit on the surface of the thallus, with an unconstricted base. They are round, 0.3–0.5 mm wide and up to 0.2 mm high, with a dark gray, flat disc and a thin white, powdery (pruinose) coating, and a yellowish margin raised above the disc and about 0.1 mm wide. The excipulum is pale yellow, the hypothecium dark brown, and the hamathecium is not inspersed and shows no reaction in the IKI test (IKI–). Each ascus contains eight ascospores. The spores are hyaline (colorless), cylindrical, and 9-septate, 46–52 × 3.5–4.5 μm, and soon fragment, without any surrounding gelatinous sheath. Pycnidia have not been observed. Standard spot tests were negative (UV−, C−, K−, KC−, P−) and thin-layer chromatography was not performed because of the limited material. Based on the yellow color and the lack of a K reaction, the pigment is thought to be an emodin-derived anthraquinone.

== Habitat and distribution ==
Mazosia flavida grows on living leaves in primary rainforest in the Reserva Cristalino region of Mato Grosso, Brazil, at elevations of about 250 to 350 m (820 to 1,150 ft). It is known only from Brazil, and no additional occurrences had been reported as of 2025.
