= Redingeria =

Scientific classification
- Domain: Eukaryota
- Kingdom: Fungi
- Division: Ascomycota
- Class: Lecanoromycetes
- Order: Graphidales
- Family: Graphidaceae
- Genus: Redingeria; Frisch (2006)

Type species
- Redingeria leiostoma (Tuck.) Frisch (2006)

Genus of lichens

Redingeria is a genus of lichen-forming fungi in the family Graphidaceae. Established in 2006 and named after the Austrian botanist Karl Martin Redinger, the genus contains ten species that grow as bark-dwelling lichens in tropical forests worldwide. These lichens are distinguished by their script-like, elongated fruiting structures with thick black borders and are sensitive to forest disturbance, serving as indicators of undisturbed woodland habitats.

== Taxonomy ==
The genus Redingeria was circumscribed in 2006 by Andreas Frisch, with Redingeria leiostoma assigned as the type species. The genus name honours Karl Martin Redinger (1907–1940), an Austrian botanist.

== Description ==
Redingeria develops a smooth, matt pale grey to yellow-olive crust (thallus) seated directly on the bark and lacking a true cortex. Its elongate, often slightly curved lirellae are 1–4 mm long, bordered by thick, charcoal-black (carbonised) walls so the script-like slits stand out sharply against the thallus. A colourless to pale brown excipulum lines the interior, while the hymenium is distinctly inspersed with minute oil droplets that give a cloudy aspect under the microscope. The thin-walled, Graphis-type asci hold eight hyaline ascospores that become markedly muriform—partitioned by numerous transverse and a few longitudinal septa—yet remain iodine-negative (I–) and typically measure 30–70 × 8–15 μm. Secondary chemistry is moderate: many species produce stictic acid or norstictic acid, occasionally accompanied by trace protocetraric-series depsidones that tint the discs yellow-brown.

The mix of fully carbonised lirellae, a clearly inspersed hymenium and large, I– muriform spores distinguishes Redingeria from superficially similar script lichens. Glyphis and Hemithecium share black margins but lack hymenial inspersion; Acanthothecis and Anomomorpha possess spinulose (spiny) periphysoids and often iodine-positive elements; whereas Kalbographa is set apart by its bright orange anthraquinone epithecium.

== Ecology ==
The genus has a pantropical distribution, with records from lowland Amazonian rainforest, West and Central African evergreen forests, Indo-Malayan dipterocarp stands and wet sclerophyll woodlands in Queensland. All known species are corticolous, occupying shaded boles and large branches where high humidity and limited direct sunlight prevail. Field surveys show that populations decline rapidly after canopy opening or repeated burning, so the presence of Redingeria is a useful indicator of long-established, relatively undisturbed forest habitat.

== Species ==
As of June 2025, Species Fungorum (in the Catalogue of Life) accept ten species of Redingeria.

- Redingeria deightonii (C.W.Dodge) Frisch (2006)
- Redingeria desseiniana Van den Broeck, Lücking & Ertz (2014) – Democratic Republic of the Congo
- Redingeria glaucoglyphica (Sipman) Frisch (2006)
- Redingeria glyphica (Nyl.) Frisch (2006)
- Redingeria krempelhuberi (Redinger) Frisch (2006)
- Redingeria leiostoma (Tuck.) Frisch (2006)
- Redingeria microspora (Zahlbr.) M.Cáceres & Lücking (2012)
- Redingeria pseudostromatica Lücking, Álvaro & B.Moncada (2023) – Colombia
- Redingeria uniseptata Kalb (2020)
- Redingeria vulcani (Hale) Lücking (2012)
