= Aspidothelium =

Scientific classification
- Kingdom: Fungi
- Division: Ascomycota
- Class: Lecanoromycetes
- Order: Thelenellales
- Family: Thelenellaceae
- Genus: Aspidothelium; Vain. (1890)

Type species
- Aspidothelium cinerascens Vain. (1890)

Genus of lichens

Aspidothelium is a genus of lichen-forming fungi in the family Thelenellaceae. All species in the genus have a tropical distribution and are crustose with a chlorococcoid photobiont partner. Most Aspidothelium species are foliicolous (leaf-dwelling), although some corticolous (bark-dwelling) species are known, as well as a single saxicolous (rock-dwelling) member.

== Taxonomy ==
The genus was circumscribed by Finnish lichenologist Edvard August Vainio in 1890. Historically, it has at times been considered as a synonym of genus Thelenella. Families in which the genus has previously been classified are the Verrucariaceae, Strigulaceae, and the Aspidotheliaceae, a monogeneric family circumscribed especially to contain this genus. Modern molecular phylogenetic analysis has shown its placement in the family Thelenellaceae, allied with the order Ostropales.

== Description ==
Aspidothelium is known for its production of perithecia that range in colour from whitish to pinkish or grey and are uncarbonized. These perithecia often exhibit wart-like, setae, or disc-like structures on their surface. Within the perithecia, dense and unbranched paraphyses and periphyses can be found alongside clavate asci and colourless ascospores. These ascospores are typically fusiform in shape, and muriform to transversely septate. Aspidothelium is particularly notable for its unique characteristic of producing fusiform ascospores with numerous transverse septa and short, broad cells.

== Species ==
- Aspidothelium arachnoideum Lücking (2008) – Costa Rica
- Aspidothelium cuyabense (Malme) P.M.McCarthy (1995)
- Aspidothelium gemmiferum Sérus. & Lücking (2001) – Papua New Guinea
- Aspidothelium glabrum Lücking, Aptroot & Sipman (2008) – Costa Rica
- Aspidothelium hirsutum Yeshitela, Eb.Fisch., Killmann & Sérus. (2009) – Ethiopia
- Aspidothelium lueckingii Flakus (2009) – Bolivia
- Aspidothelium macrosporum (Müll.Arg.) Lücking (2008)
- Aspidothelium mirabile Lücking (1999) – Ecuador
- Aspidothelium ornatum Lücking (1999) – Ecuador
- Aspidothelium papillicarpum Lücking (2008) – Costa Rica
- Aspidothelium scutellicarpum Lücking (1999) – Ecuador
- Aspidothelium silverstonei Soto-Medina, Aptroot & Lücking (2017) – Colombia
- Aspidothelium submuriforme Aptroot, L.I.Ferraro & M.Cáceres (2014) – Argentina
- Aspidothelium trichothelioides Sérus. & Vězda (1978) – Africa & tropical America
- Aspidothelium verruculosum R.Sant. (1952) – tropical Asia & Australia
