= Chiba Prefectural Museum of Art =

- 千葉県立美術館
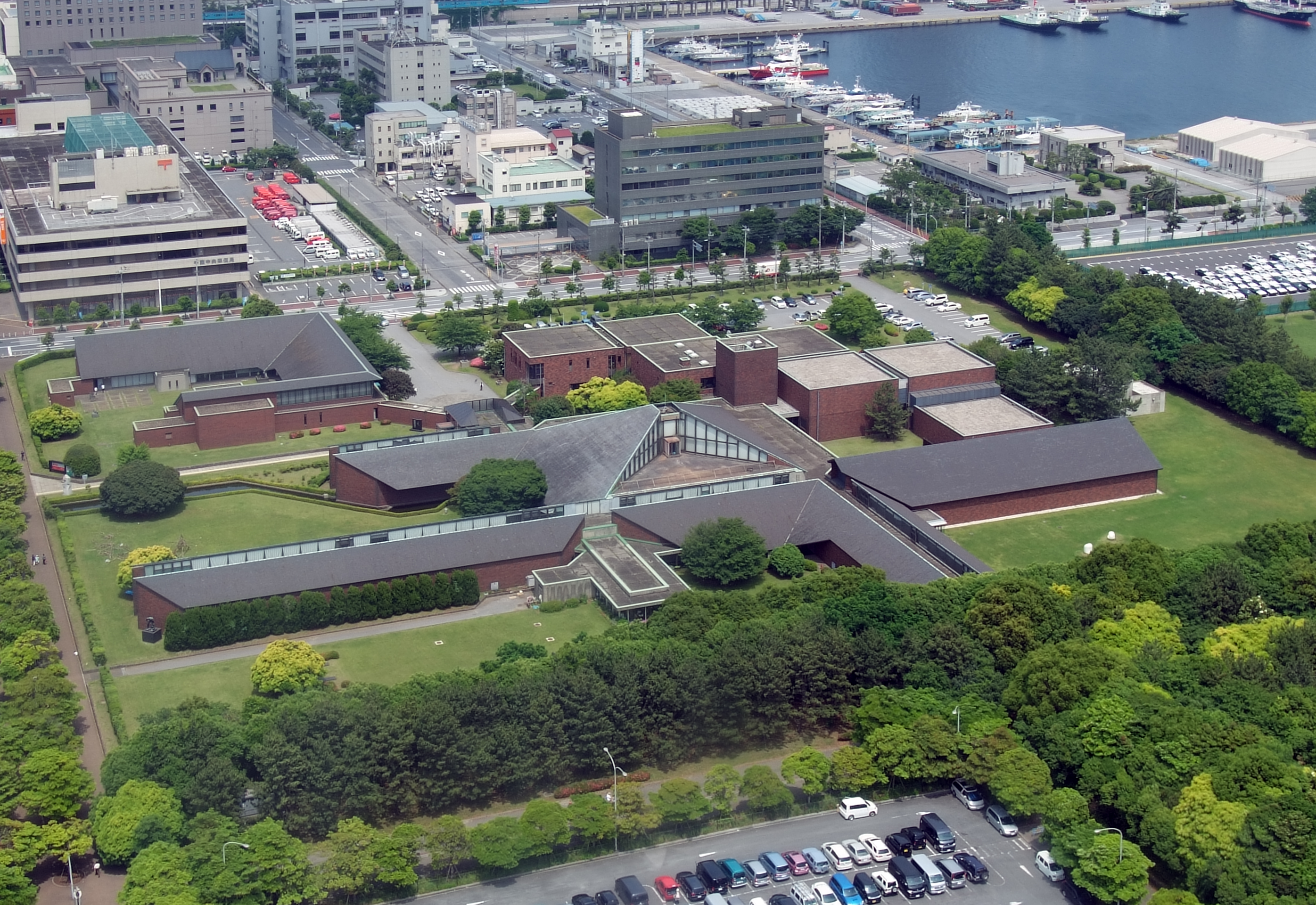
- Interactive map of the Chiba Prefectural Museum of Art area

General information
- Location: 1-10-1 Chūō-kō, Chūō-ku, Chiba, Chiba Prefecture, Japan
- Coordinates: 35°36′04″N 140°06′03″E
- Opened: 23 October 1974

Website
- Official website

Chiba Prefectural Museum of Art (千葉県立美術館, Chiba Kenritsu Bijutsukan) opened in Chiba, Chiba Prefecture, Japan in 1974. The focus of the collection is the work of local artists and of artists with connections to Chiba, and it includes paintings by Asai Chū, Millais, Corot, and Antonio Fontanesi.

== History ==
In 1968, plans for a prefectural art museum in Chiba were first proposed. In April 1973, the Chiba Prefectural Board of Education established a preparatory office to oversee the project. Construction of the exhibition wing was completed in March 1974, and the museum officially opened to the public on 23 October 1974.

The facility was expanded several times in subsequent decades. A management wing was added in 1976, followed by an atelier wing in 1980. In 1988, further galleries and storage spaces were constructed to accommodate the growing collection.

After a redevelopment project, the museum reopened on 11 July 2020 with expanded facilities and updated gallery layouts aimed at appealing to a broader audience.

== See also ==
- Kawamura Memorial DIC Museum of Art
- National Museum of Japanese History
- List of Historic Sites of Japan (Chiba)
