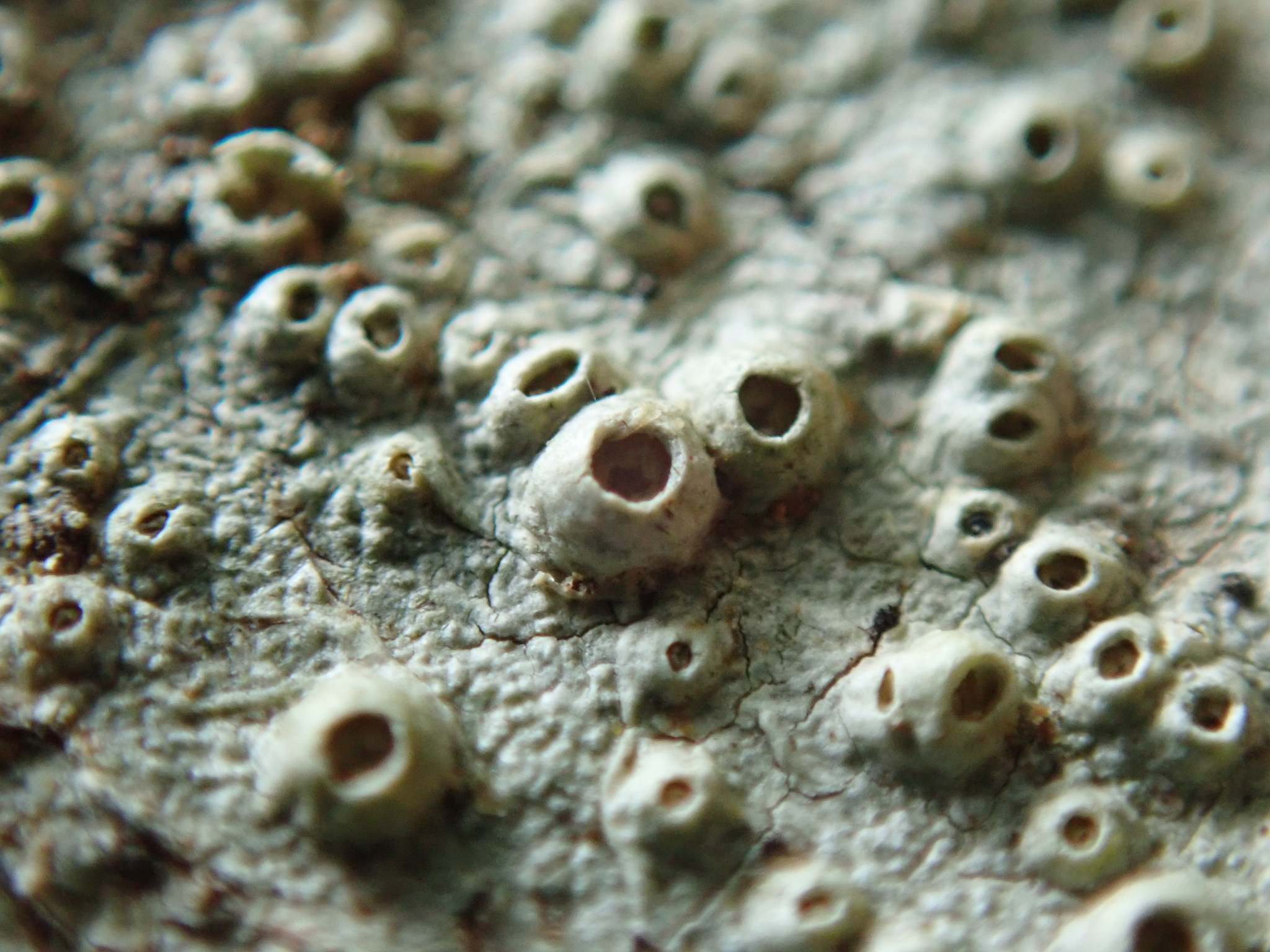

Scientific classification
- Kingdom: Fungi
- Division: Ascomycota
- Class: Lecanoromycetes
- Order: Graphidales
- Family: Graphidaceae
- Genus: Thelotrema
- Species: T. lepadinum

Binomial name
- Thelotrema lepadinum (Ach.) Ach. (1803)

Synonyms
- List: Lichen lepadinus Ach. (1799); Lichen opegraphus * lepadinum (Ach.) Lam. (1813); Endocarpon lepadinum (Ach.) Wahlenb. (1826); Pertusaria lepadina (Ach.) Hornem. (1837); Parmelia lepadina (Ach.) Hornem. (1837); Volvaria lepadina (Ach.) A.Massal. (1852); Antrocarpum lepadinum (Ach.) Trevis. (1852); Urceolaria lepadina (Ach.) Tuck. ex Curtis (1867); Lichen inclusus Sowerby (1800); Thelotrema lepadinum var. inclusum (Sowerby) Ach. (1803); Thelotrema inclusum (Sowerby) Funck (1808); Antrocarpum inclusum (Sowerby) Spreng. (1827); Thelotrema lepadinum var. scutelliforme Ach. (1810); Lichen opegraphus var. scutelliforme (Ach.) Lam. (1813); Endocarpon lepadinum var. scutelliforme (Ach.) Wahlenb. (1826); Thelotrema lepadinum var. rupestre Turner (1839); Thelotrema lepadinum f. rupestre (Turner) Cromb. (1894); Thelotrema obconicum Räsänen (1949); Thelotrematomyces lepadini E.A.Thomas ex Cif. & Tomas. (1954)

= Thelotrema lepadinum =

Species of lichen-forming fungus

Thelotrema lepadinum is a species of crustose lichen in the family Graphidaceae. Commonly known as bark barnacles, it forms a greyish crust on tree bark, dotted with numerous small, urn-shaped fruiting bodies that have distinctive white-rimmed openings. The lichen is found worldwide on smooth-barked deciduous trees, and in Europe it serves as an indicator of ancient woodland due to its preference for long-undisturbed forests. First described by the Swedish lichenologist Erik Acharius in 1799, the species has been reclassified multiple times throughout its taxonomic history.

== Taxonomy ==
The species was first described in 1799 by the Swedish lichenologist Erik Acharius, as Lichen lepadinus, based on a smooth, glaucous-green, contiguous crust with scattered, smooth hemispherical to somewhat conical warts containing open, urn-shaped apothecia with an entire margin, growing on elm bark. Acharius compared its general appearance to Lichen pertusus and suggested that, because the concave warts remain permanently open, the species was better placed near Urceolaria than among Verrucaria. In 1803 he transferred the species to the genus Thelotrema as Thelotrema lepadinum, describing the thallus as a cartilaginous-membranous, smooth, glaucous-green crust with scattered somewhat conical, gaping, urn-shaped warts that are dark within and have an entire membranous rim around the ostiole; he again recorded it from the bark of field elm (Ulmus campestris). The species has a complicated nomenclatural history, having been transferred among several genera, including Lichen, Endocarpon, Pertusaria, Parmelia, Volvaria, Antrocarpum, Urceolaria and Thelotrematomyces, and treated under various infraspecific names. Sowerby's Lichen inclusus and its later combinations, Acharius's varieties scutelliforme and rupestre, Räsänen's Thelotrema obconicum and Thomas's Thelotrematomyces lepadini are all now regarded as synonyms of Thelotrema lepadinum.

In a later revision of sect. Thelotrema, George Salisbury treated T. lepadinum as the type species of the genus and characterised the T. lepadinum group by its colourless excipulum with internal periphyses, incurved thalline margin and colourless muriform ascospores, using these features to define Thelotrema in a strict sense. Salisbury's revision reduced the T. lepadinum group, as defined by this excipulum structure, to about ten species (plus two subspecies) from among more than 200 species of Thelotrema sensu lato that he studied, leaving the group as a relatively small subset within the genus.

In North America, the lichen is common known as "bark barnacles".

== Description ==
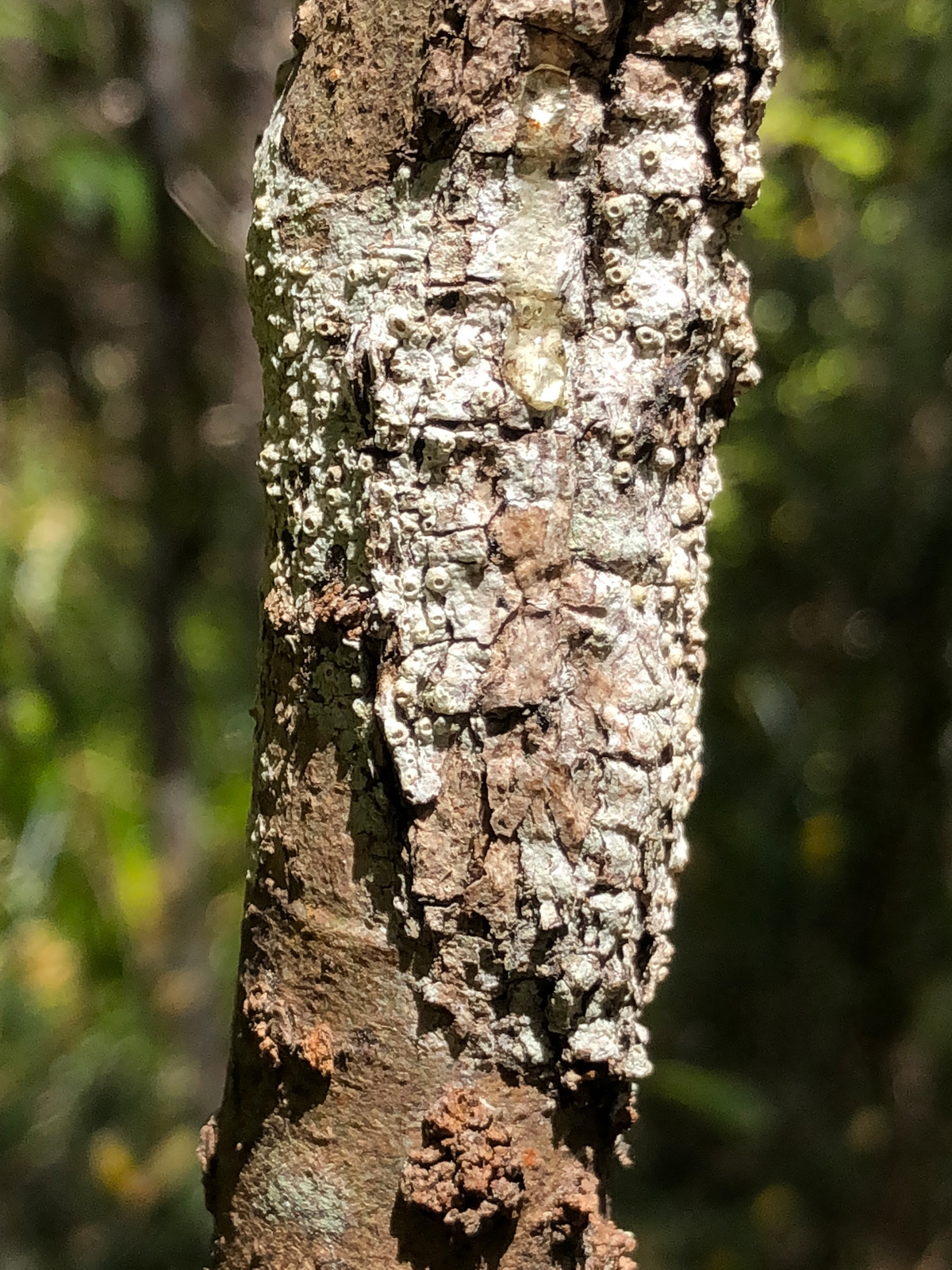
Thelotrema lepadinum growing on bark in New Zealand

The thallus of Thelotrema lepadinum forms a thin to rather thick crust, reaching up to about 2 mm in thickness. It is usually smooth but can be slightly uneven, and tends to be continuous rather than patchy. The surface is greyish fawn to pale ochre and lies mainly on the surface of the substrate. In vertical section, the medulla contains numerous calcium oxalate crystals, which are especially abundant in the thalline margin surrounding the apothecia. The apothecia are usually very numerous and more or less evenly scattered, typically 1–2 mm in diameter but occasionally as small as about 0.6 mm, and are immersed in small, hemispherical warts of the thallus. They are urceolate (urn-shaped), with a white ostiolar opening up to about 0.5 mm across and an entire thalline margin. The true exciple is free from the surrounding thallus and can often be seen through the opening as a colourless, non-striate ring. The disc itself is blackish and frequently covered by a whitish to greyish pruina, and is generally visible through an irregular opening in the inner exciple. The hymenium is relatively tall, usually 140–190 micrometres (μm) high but occasionally ranging from about 120 to 200 μm.

The asci usually contain two to four ascospores, but in some cases may have only one or as many as eight. The ascospores are broadly spindle-shaped (fusiform), typically 60–135 × 15–25 μm but occasionally as small as about 30 × 10 μm or as large as about 150 × 33 μm, remain colourless at maturity, and usually have 10–15 transverse septa (sometimes as few as 8 or as many as 19) together with 1–3 longitudinal septa (occasionally up to 5). They show a weakly purple iodine reaction (I±) and are surrounded by a thick gelatinous sheath. Standard spot tests on the thallus and medulla are negative (C−, K−, KC−, Pd−, UV−), and thin-layer chromatography has not detected lichen substances; however, internal crystals may sometimes give a K+ reaction, turning from yellow to red.

== Habitat and distribution ==
In his revision of the Thelotrema lepadinum group, Salisbury regarded Thelotrema lepadinum as likely to be cosmopolitan in distribution. He cited type or other authentic material referable to this species from a range of regions, including South Carolina in the United States (Santee Canal), Sri Lanka (Peradeniya), New Zealand (Rangitoto Island, on Metrosideros tomentosa), and New South Wales in Australia (Katoomba). He also mentioned a morphologically similar collection from Tjibodas in Java whose spores showed a strong iodine reaction, and which he suggested might represent a different species. The 2001 work Lichens of North America suggests that the lichen's northern North American distribution is largely limited to the coastal areas; despite this restricted range, it is the most common Thelotrema species on the continent.

In Europe, particularly in Britain and Ireland, Thelotrema lepadinum typically grows on smooth or slightly rough bark of deciduous trees, and only rarely on siliceous rock. In long-undisturbed, continuous woodland it can become very abundant, with more than 400 occupied trees per hectare recorded, and it is therefore used as a indicator of ancient woodland. Within this region it is scattered in suitable sites throughout Britain and Ireland. The form of the apothecia varies with microhabitat: on dry, exposed trunks of smooth-barked deciduous trees they tend to be regularly volcano-like with a narrow opening, whereas in moist, often shaded situations they are larger, more widely open and ulcerose (irregularly open, eroded), with a thick, prominent, somewhat scurfy rim. In humid, oceanic areas well-developed material may be confused with the rarer Thelotrema macrosporum.
