= Ternstroemia luquillensis =

Conservation status
- Critically Endangered (IUCN 2.3)

- Endangered (ESA)

Scientific classification
- Kingdom: Plantae
- Clade: Tracheophytes
- Clade: Angiosperms
- Clade: Eudicots
- Clade: Asterids
- Order: Ericales
- Family: Pentaphylacaceae
- Genus: Ternstroemia
- Species: T. luquillensis

Binomial name
- Ternstroemia luquillensis Krug & Urb.

Species of plant

Ternstroemia luquillensis, the palo colorado, is a species of plant in the Pentaphylacaceae family. It is endemic to Puerto Rico. It is threatened by habitat loss and has been listed as an endangered species in the United States since 1992 under the Endangered Species Act
