= Kalbographa =

Scientific classification
- Domain: Eukaryota
- Kingdom: Fungi
- Division: Ascomycota
- Class: Lecanoromycetes
- Order: Graphidales
- Family: Graphidaceae
- Genus: Kalbographa; Lücking (2007)

Type species
- Kalbographa caracasana (Müll.Arg.) Lücking (2007)

Species
- K. cabbalistica K. caracasana K. hypoglaucoides K. lobata K. lueckingii K. miniata

Genus of lichen-forming fungi

Kalbographa is a genus of lichen-forming fungi in the family Graphidaceae. These lichens form thin, grey-white to pale yellow-olive crusts on tree bark and are distinguished by their striking bright orange to brick-red fruiting bodies that create sharp black slits against the surface. The genus has a pantropical distribution, growing on shaded tree trunks and large branches of mature trees in humid forests, where their brightly pigmented discs are believed to provide protection from sunlight and their presence serves as an indicator of intact, closed-canopy forest.

== Taxonomy ==
The genus was circumscribed in 2007 by the lichenologist Robert Lücking with Kalbographa caracasana assigned as the type species. The genus name honours the German lichenologist Klaus Kalb.

== Description ==
Kalbographa forms a thin, grey-white to pale yellow-olive crust (thallus) that embeds directly in the bark and lacks a protective cortex. Its fruit bodies are short to elongate lirellae whose walls are wholly carbonised, creating sharp black slits that stand out against the thallus. A striking feature is the bright orange- to brick-red epithecium produced by anthraquinone pigments; a fine granular pruina may accentuate the colour. Beneath the pigmented roof lies a clear, non-inspersed hymenium lined with simple periphysoids and smooth paraphyses. The thin-walled Graphis-type asci usually contain eight hyaline ascospores that become markedly muriform—divided by many transverse and a few longitudinal septa—yet remain iodine-negative (I–). Secondary chemistry is dominated by anthraquinones such as fragilin and parietin, sometimes combined with trace stictic acid-series depsidones that lend a brownish tint to the discs.

The co-occurrence of fully carbonised lirellae, a vividly coloured epithecium and large I– muriform spores distinguishes Kalbographa from superficially similar script lichens. In Glyphis the epithecium is dull brown or absent and the pigments are depsidones rather than anthraquinones; Carbacanthographis shares the black margins but lacks bright pigments and has much smaller spores; whereas Acanthothecis and Hemithecium possess spinulose periphysoids and, in many cases, iodine-reactive elements in the hymenium. Within Kalbographa itself, species differ mainly in disc colour nuances, pruina density and spore dimensions, yet all retain the conspicuous orange epithecium.

== Ecology ==
The genus is pantropical, recorded from humid lowland Amazonia, central African rainforests, Southeast Asian dipterocarp stands and wet sclerophyll forests in Queensland. All species are strictly corticolous, occupying shaded trunk and large branches of mature trees where prolonged surface moisture favours both vegetative spread and pigment production. Brightly pigmented discs are believed to confer photoprotection in intermittent sunflecks, allowing the lichens to persist on exposed trunk faces that many Graphidaceae avoid.

Field observations indicate that Kalbographa is sparse or absent where heavy logging, agricultural edge effects or canopy opening reduce humidity; several species therefore serve as practical indicators of intact, closed-canopy forest. Conversely, the widespread K. cinnabarina can colonise secondary woodland once a closed canopy re-establishes, making the genus a useful gauge of mid-successional recovery in tropical reforestation projects.

== Species ==
- Kalbographa cabbalistica (Nyl.) Lücking (2021)
- Kalbographa caracasana (Müll.Arg.) Lücking (2007)
- Kalbographa hypoglaucoides (Kr.P.Singh & D.D.Awasthi) Kr.P.Singh & Pushpi Singh (2017)
- Kalbographa lobata Lücking (2007)
- Kalbographa lueckingii Kalb (2009)
- Kalbographa miniata Lücking (2007)
