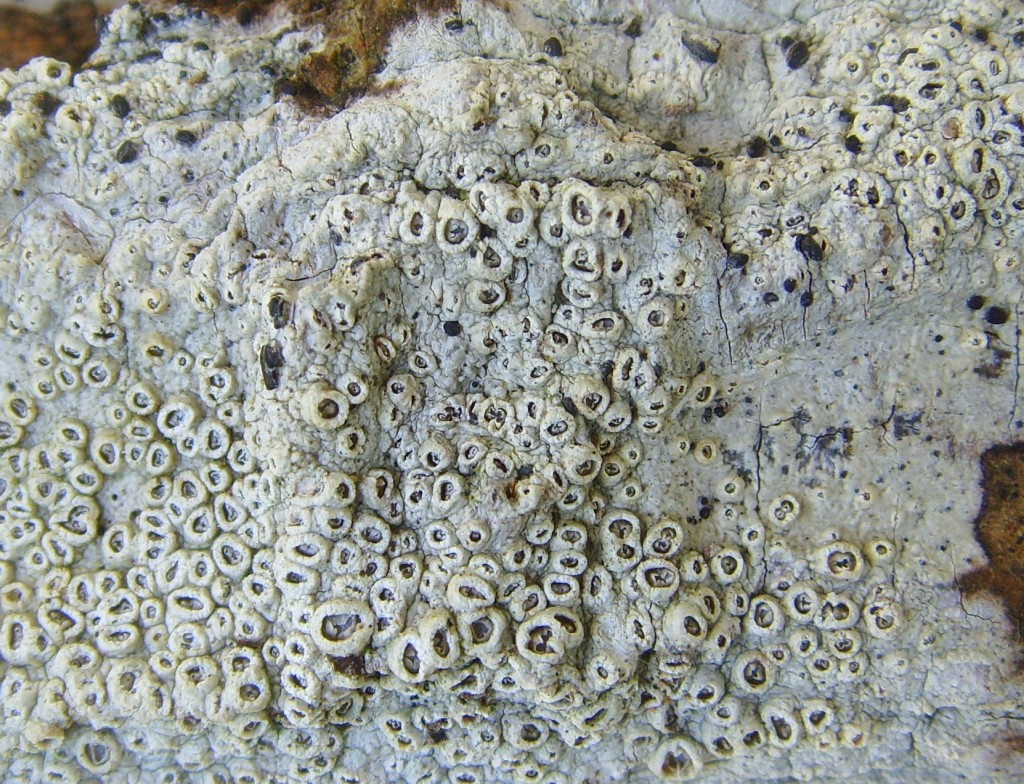
- Thelotrema lepadinum

Scientific classification
- Domain: Eukaryota
- Kingdom: Fungi
- Division: Ascomycota
- Class: Lecanoromycetes
- Order: Graphidales
- Family: Graphidaceae
- Genus: Thelotrema; Ach. (1803)

Type species
- Thelotrema lepadinum (Ach.) Ach. (1803)

= Thelotrema =

Genus of lichen-forming fungi

Thelotrema is a genus of lichen-forming fungi in the family Graphidaceae, the family to which all taxa in the former Thelotremataceae now belong.

Members of the genus Thelotrema are commonly called barnacle lichens.

== Description ==
Thelotrema lichens have a thallus with colours ranging from white to yellow-grey or light olive. The texture of the thallus can be smooth, uneven, or verrucose, with the presence of either an ecorticate surface or a loosely to rarely dense proso- to paraplectenchymatous cortex. The photobiont layer and medulla frequently contain clusters of calcium oxalate crystals.

The apothecia can be immersed or sessile and appear rounded or angular-rounded. The disc is partially covered by remnants of the excipulum, while the margin can be entire, undulate, or fissured, displaying a distinct double margin. The columella is absent in this genus. The excipulum is paraplectenchymatous, uncarbonized, and varies in colour from colourless to brown. It has distinct periphysoids, and the paraphyses are unbranched.

Thelotrema ascospores are transversely septate to muriform, fusiform-ellipsoid to oblong-cylindrical, and feature thin to thick septa with angular to rounded lumina. The outer wall of the spores is often thick, and the spores may be colourless or brown. They can display weak to strong violet-blue amyloid reactions. The secondary chemistry of Thelotrema lichens generally includes stictic acid or norstictic acid or closely related compounds, with hypoprotocetraric acid appearing rarely.

== Species ==
As of December 2022, Species Fungorum (in the Catalogue of Life) accepts 165 species of Thelotrema.

- Thelotrema adjectum Nyl. (1866)
- Thelotrema africanum (Hale) Hale (1980)
- Thelotrema ahtii Sipman (1994)
- Thelotrema albidopallens Nyl. (1873)
- Thelotrema allosporoides Nyl. (1873)
- Thelotrema amabilis B.de Lesd. (1927)
- Thelotrema amazonicum Rivas Plata & Lücking (2012)
- Thelotrema armellense Patw., Sethy & Nagarkar (1986)
- Thelotrema attenuatum (C.Knight) Hellb. (1896)
- Thelotrema australiense Müll.Arg. (1887)
- Thelotrema berendsohnii Sipman (2014)
- Thelotrema berkeleyanum (Mont.) Brusse (1988)
- Thelotrema bicuspidatum Müll.Arg. (1891)
- Thelotrema biliranum Vain. (1921)
- Thelotrema byssoideum (Kremp.) G.Salisb. (1966)
- Thelotrema californicum Tuck. (1877)
- Thelotrema cameroonense C.W.Dodge (1953)
- Thelotrema canarense Patw. & C.R.Kulk. (1977)
- Thelotrema canescens Tat.Matsumoto (2000)
- Thelotrema capense Zahlbr. (1932)
- Thelotrema capetribulense Mangold (2008)
- Thelotrema catastictum Tuck. (1866)
- Thelotrema cinerellum Müll.Arg. (1891)
- Thelotrema cinereovirens Kremp. (1875)
- Thelotrema colobicum Nyl. (1873)
- Thelotrema conferendum Hale (1975)
- Thelotrema confertum Nagarkar, Sethy & Patw. (1987)
- Thelotrema configuratum (Hale) Mangold (2016)
- Thelotrema crassisporum Mangold (2009)
- Thelotrema crateriforme Bél. (1834)
- Thelotrema crespoae Mangold, Elix & Lumbsch (2008)
- Thelotrema cubanum Tuck. (1862)
- Thelotrema cyphelloides Müll.Arg. (1895)
- Thelotrema defectum Hale ex R.C.Harris (1990)
- Thelotrema defossum (Müll.Arg.) Mangold (2008)
- Thelotrema demersum (Müll.Arg.) G.Salisb. (1978)
- Thelotrema demissum Flot. (1842)
- Thelotrema depressum Mont. (1851)
- Thelotrema dignitosum (Kremp.) Zahlbr. (1923)
- Thelotrema dislaceratum Kremp. (1875)
- Thelotrema dissultum Hale (1981)
- Thelotrema dominicanum Hale (1974)
- Thelotrema elmeri Vain. (1921)
- Thelotrema endoxanthum Müll.Arg. (1891)
- Thelotrema eungellaense Mangold, Elix & Lumbsch (2007)
- Thelotrema euphorbiae Frisch (2006)
- Thelotrema expansum C.Knight (1888)
- Thelotrema exsertum (Stirt.) Zahlbr. (1923)
- Thelotrema farinaceum C.Knight (1883)
- Thelotrema fijiense Lumbsch, Lücking & Naikatini (2011)
- Thelotrema fissiporum Hale (1974)
- Thelotrema flavescens Darb. (1912)
- Thelotrema floridense R.C.Harris (1990)
- Thelotrema formosanum Zahlbr. (1933)
- Thelotrema foveolare Müll.Arg. (1891)
- Thelotrema fuscosubtile Mangold, Lücking & Lumbsch (2014)
- Thelotrema galactizans Harm. (1912)
- Thelotrema gallowayanum Mangold, Elix & Lumbsch (2007)
- Thelotrema gomezianum Lücking (2012)
- Thelotrema granatum Kremp. (1875)
- Thelotrema grossimarginatum Tat.Matsumoto (2000)
- Thelotrema harmandii Pit. (1911)
- Thelotrema hawaiiense (Hale) Hale (1980)
- Thelotrema heladivense Weerakoon, Jayalal & Lücking (2015)
- Thelotrema hnatiukii Sipman (2010)
- Thelotrema hypomelaenum Müll.Arg. (1895)
- Thelotrema hypoprotocetraricum (Hale) Hale (1980)
- Thelotrema indicum Hale (1975)
- Thelotrema infundibulare Tat.Matsumoto (2000)
- Thelotrema inscalpens Nyl. (1867)
- Thelotrema inspersoporinaceum Mangold, Lücking & Lumbsch (2014)
- Thelotrema integrellum Harm. (1912)
- Thelotrema isidiophorum (Kremp.) Zahlbr. (1923)
- Thelotrema isidiosum S.Joshi, Upreti & Hur (2018)
- Thelotrema jugale (Müll.Arg.) Lücking (2012)
- Thelotrema kalakkadense Nagarkar, Sethy & Patw. (1987)
- Thelotrema kalarense Sethy, Nagarkar & Patw. (1987)
- Thelotrema kamatii (Patw. & C.R.Kulk.) Hale (1980)
- Thelotrema kinabaluense Sipman (2014)
- Thelotrema lacteum Kremp. (1864)
- Thelotrema laurisilvae Lücking & Breuss (2012)
- Thelotrema lecanodeum Nyl. (1876)
- Thelotrema lepademersum Nagarkar, Sethy & Patw. (1987)
- Thelotrema lepadinum (Ach.) Ach. (1803)
- Thelotrema leprocarpoides Hale (1981)
- Thelotrema leucocarpum Nyl. (1863)
- Thelotrema leucocheilum Vain. (1921)
- Thelotrema lirellizans Zahlbr. (1944)
- Thelotrema lueckingii Breuss (2013)
- Thelotrema macrosporum P.M.Jørg. & P.James (1995)
- Thelotrema manosporum (C.Knight) Hellb. (1896)
- Thelotrema marginatum Eschw. (1834)
- Thelotrema megasporum S.Joshi, Upreti & Hur (2018)
- Thelotrema meridense Hale (1975)
- Thelotrema minarum Vain. (1890)
- Thelotrema minisporum Wijey., Lücking & Lumbsch (2012)
- Thelotrema mongkolsukii Homchant. & Coppins (2002)
- Thelotrema monospermum R.C.Harris (1990)
- Thelotrema monosporum Nyl. (1861)
- Thelotrema murinum Zahlbr. (1933)
- Thelotrema nipponicum Tat.Matsumoto (2000)
- Thelotrema nostalgicum G.Salisb. (1972)
- Thelotrema occlusum Nyl. (1867)
- Thelotrema oleosum Mangold (2008)
- Thelotrema osornense C.W.Dodge (1967)
- Thelotrema paludosum Sipman (2014)
- Thelotrema papillosum Hale (1974)
- Thelotrema parvisporum Sipman (2014)
- Thelotrema parvizebrinum Mangold (2009)
- Thelotrema patwardhanii (Hale) Rivas Plata & Mangold (2010)
- Thelotrema pauperculum Vain. (1929)
- Thelotrema perriei Papong, Lücking & Lumbsch (2014)
- Thelotrema philippinum Rivas Plata, Sipman & Lücking (2014)
- Thelotrema phliuense Homchant. & Coppins (2002)
- Thelotrema pidurutalagalum Hale (1981)
- Thelotrema piluliferum Tuck. (1868)
- Thelotrema poeltii Patw. & C.R.Kulk. (1977)
- Thelotrema polythecium Sethy, Nagarkar & Patw. (1987)
- Thelotrema porinoides Mont. & Bosch (1856)
- Thelotrema profundum (Stirt.) Shirley (1889)
- Thelotrema pruinosum D.S.Clemente (1867)
- Thelotrema pseudosimilans Weerakoon, Wijey. & Lumbsch (2012)
- Thelotrema pseudosubtile Mangold (2008)
- Thelotrema quitoense Fée (1837)
- Thelotrema reunionis Kalb (2009)
- Thelotrema rhamni-purshianae E.Senft (1897)
- Thelotrema rhododiscum Homchant. & Coppins (2002)
- Thelotrema rhodothecium Vain. (1915)
- Thelotrema rockii (Zahlbr.) Hale (1980)
- Thelotrema rugatulum Nyl. (1873)
- Thelotrema samaranum Vain. (1921)
- Thelotrema saxicola (Vain.) G. Salisb. (1972)
- Thelotrema scabrosum Hale (1974)
- Thelotrema sendaiense Vain. (1918)
- Thelotrema similans Nyl. (1890)
- Thelotrema simplex Tuck. (1866)
- Thelotrema sitianum Vain. (1890)
- Thelotrema stenosporum Zahlbr. (1944)
- Thelotrema stromatiferum Harm. (1912)
- Thelotrema subadjectum Mangold (2009)
- Thelotrema subexpallescens Nagarkar, Sethy & Patw. (1987)
- Thelotrema subgeminum (Nyl.) Nyl. (1891)
- Thelotrema subgranulosum Jatta (1911)
- Thelotrema subhiatum Patw. & Nagarkar (1980)
- Thelotrema submyriocarpum Lücking (2012)
- Thelotrema suboccultum (Stirt.) Hellb. (1896)
- Thelotrema subsphaerosporum Harm. (1912)
- Thelotrema subweberi Sipman (1993)
- Thelotrema suecicum (H.Magn.) P.James (1977)
- Thelotrema tetrasporum (Stirt.) D.D.Awasthi (1965)
- Thelotrema thesaurum Mangold (2009)
- Thelotrema triseptatum Mangold (2009)
- Thelotrema tristanense Øvstedal (2010)
- Thelotrema trypethelioides C.Knight ex F.M.Bailey (1884)
- Thelotrema umbonatum Müll.Arg. (1891)
- Thelotrema umbratum (Ach.) Fée (1837)
- Thelotrema velatum Müll.Arg. (1894)
- Thelotrema verrucorugosum Nagarkar, Sethy & Patw. (1987)
- Thelotrema verruculosum Nagarkar & Hale (1989)
- Thelotrema weberi Hale (1974)
- Thelotrema wilsoniorum Sipman & Lücking (2012)
- Thelotrema zenkeri C.W.Dodge (1964)
- Thelotrema zimbabwense Frisch (2006)
