= Robert Lücking =

German lichenologist

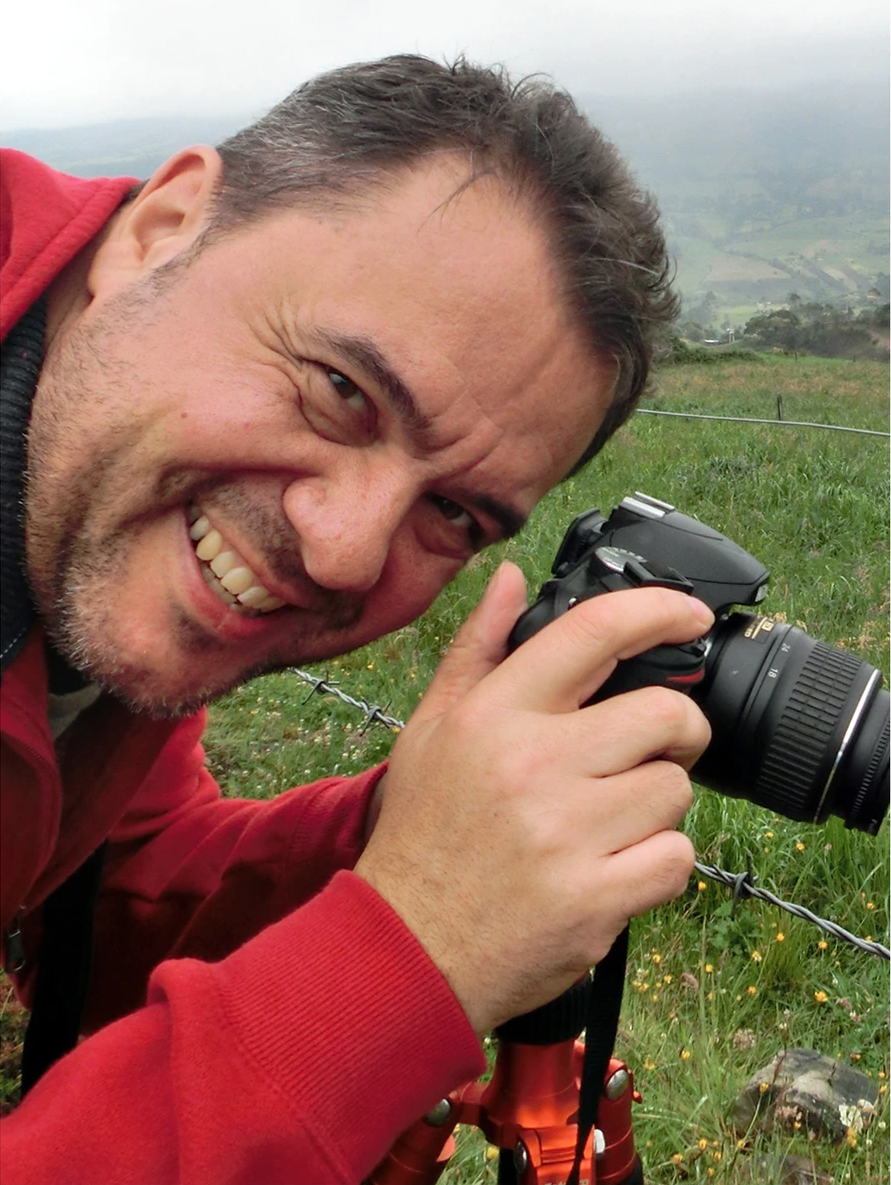
- Born: 1964 (age 61–62); Ulm, West Germany
- Education: University of Ulm
- Awards: Mason E. Hale Award (1996); Augustin Pyramus de Candolle prize (2008); Tuckerman Award (2008, 2017)
- Scientific career
- Fields: Lichenology
- Workplaces: Field Museum of Natural History; Berlin Botanical Garden and Botanical Museum
- Author abbrev. (botany): Lücking

Robert Lücking (born 1964) is a German lichenologist, known for his research on foliicolous lichens (lichens that live on leaves) and his contributions to the taxonomy, ecology, and biodiversity of fungi and lichens. He earned his master's and PhD from the University of Ulm, focusing on foliicolous lichens. He has received numerous awards for his work, including the Mason E. Hale Award for his doctoral thesis, the Augustin Pyramus de Candolle prize for his monograph, and the Tuckerman Award twice for his publications in the scientific journal The Bryologist.

Since 2015, Lücking has been serving as the curator of lichens, fungi, and bryophytes at the Berlin Botanical Garden and Botanical Museum, overseeing a vast scientific collection and contributing to major advancements in molecular phylogenetics in lichenology. Lücking has authored or co-authored the description of more than 1000 taxa, making him one of the most prolific modern lichenologists. His role extends beyond research as he is actively involved in editorial duties for key lichenological journals and has advised on conservation and biodiversity projects globally. Several lichen species and two genera have been named in his honour.

== Education and career ==
Robert Lücking was born in 1964 in Ulm, southern Germany. He was introduced to lichenology through his interest in photography, a hobby that led him to explore tropical foliicolous lichens during his study year abroad in Costa Rica. Inspired by his supervisor, the late bryologist Sieghard Winkler, Lücking chose to study these leaf-dwelling lichens. This marked the beginning of his exploration into lichens, paving the way for his future career. He completed his master's degree in 1990 and his PhD in 1994 at the University of Ulm, with both degrees focusing on the taxonomy, ecology, and biodiversity of foliicolous lichens.

In 1996, Lücking was awarded the Mason E. Hale award for an "outstanding doctoral thesis presented by a candidate on a lichenological theme". His thesis was titled Foliikole Flechten und ihre Mikrohabitatpraferenzen in einem tropischen Regenwald in Costa Rica ("Foliicolous lichens and their microhabitat preferences in a tropical rainforest in Costa Rica"). In this work, Lücking recorded 177 foliicolous lichen species from the shrub layer in a Costa Rican tropical forest. Lücking later won the 2008 Augustin Pyramus de Candolle prize for a monograph he published based on this work; this award is given every four years by the Société de Physique et d'Histoire naturelle de Genève to "reward the author or -authors of the best monograph of a genus or family of plants". In this 866-page work, Lücking compiled the revised nomenclature, description, ecology and distribution, and specimen information for 616 species and 15 infrageneric taxa. The monograph, estimated to cover descriptions of approximately 70% of the world's known foliicolous lichens at that time, was favourably compared to and deemed a worthy successor of the seminal 1952 work on these lichens by Rolf Santesson. Following the publication of this monograph, he was described by the Austrian lichenologist Martin Grube as "today's leading expert on foliicolous lichens". Around this time in his career, Lücking was noted to have spent more than six years studying in the field, on all five continents and in over 20 countries. He had supervised or was supervising about fifteen diploma projects and a dozen theses dedicated to the study of foliicolous lichens and related topics. With financial backing from the National Science Foundation (NSF), he initiated TICOLICHEN, the first major modern inventory of lichen biodiversity in a tropical country.

After a short-term assignment as a visiting professor in Recife, Brazil, he undertook a two-year post-doctoral stint in Ulm to further study foliicolous lichens. Lücking earned his habilitation from his studies (1998–2001) at the University of Bayreuth, under the supervision of Gerhard Rambold. In 2001, he was hired as adjunct curator at Chicago's Field Museum of Natural History, and was later promoted to research collections manager for mycology. Lücking and co-authors have twice been bestowed with the Tuckerman Award from the American Bryological and Lichenological Society; this award is given to the most outstanding lichenological paper published each year in the scientific journal The Bryologist. The first (awarded in 2008) was for their publication about the Gomphillaceae in eastern North America, while the second (awarded in 2017) was the highly cited "2016 classification of lichenized fungi in the Ascomycota and Basidiomycota".

As the Field Museum's adjunct curator, Lücking led a NSF-funded project that hosted 42 workshops on tropical mycology and lichenology across 16 Latin American countries, engaging 648 participants from 24 countries. This initiative supported over 50 theses and produced more than 50 collaborative scientific papers, including the discovery of over a hundred new species.

Since 1 July 2015, Lücking has been the curator of lichens, fungi, and bryophytes at the Berlin Botanical Garden and Botanical Museum, overseeing the management, curation, and digitisation of a collection that encompasses approximately one million species. Other research interests of his include fungal evolution, systematics, and nomenclature. He is a prolific author (or coauthor) of new fungal and lichen species, having formally described about 1000 of them as of December 2017. Early in his career, from 1993 to 2000, Lücking compiled 250 issues of an exsiccata series (sets of dried and labelled herbarium specimens) titled Lichenes foliicoli exsiccati.

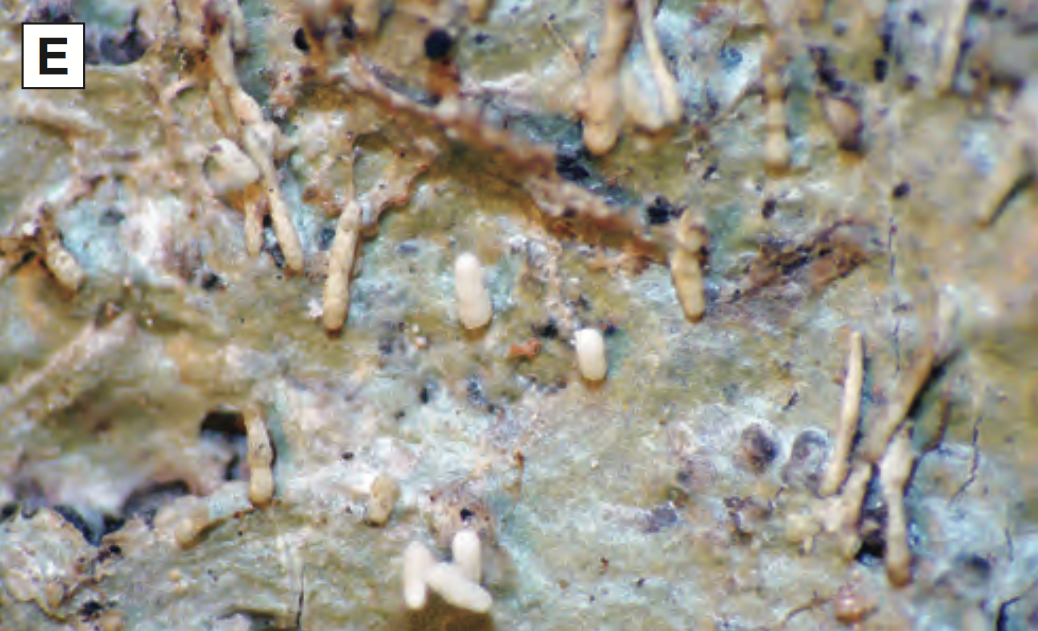

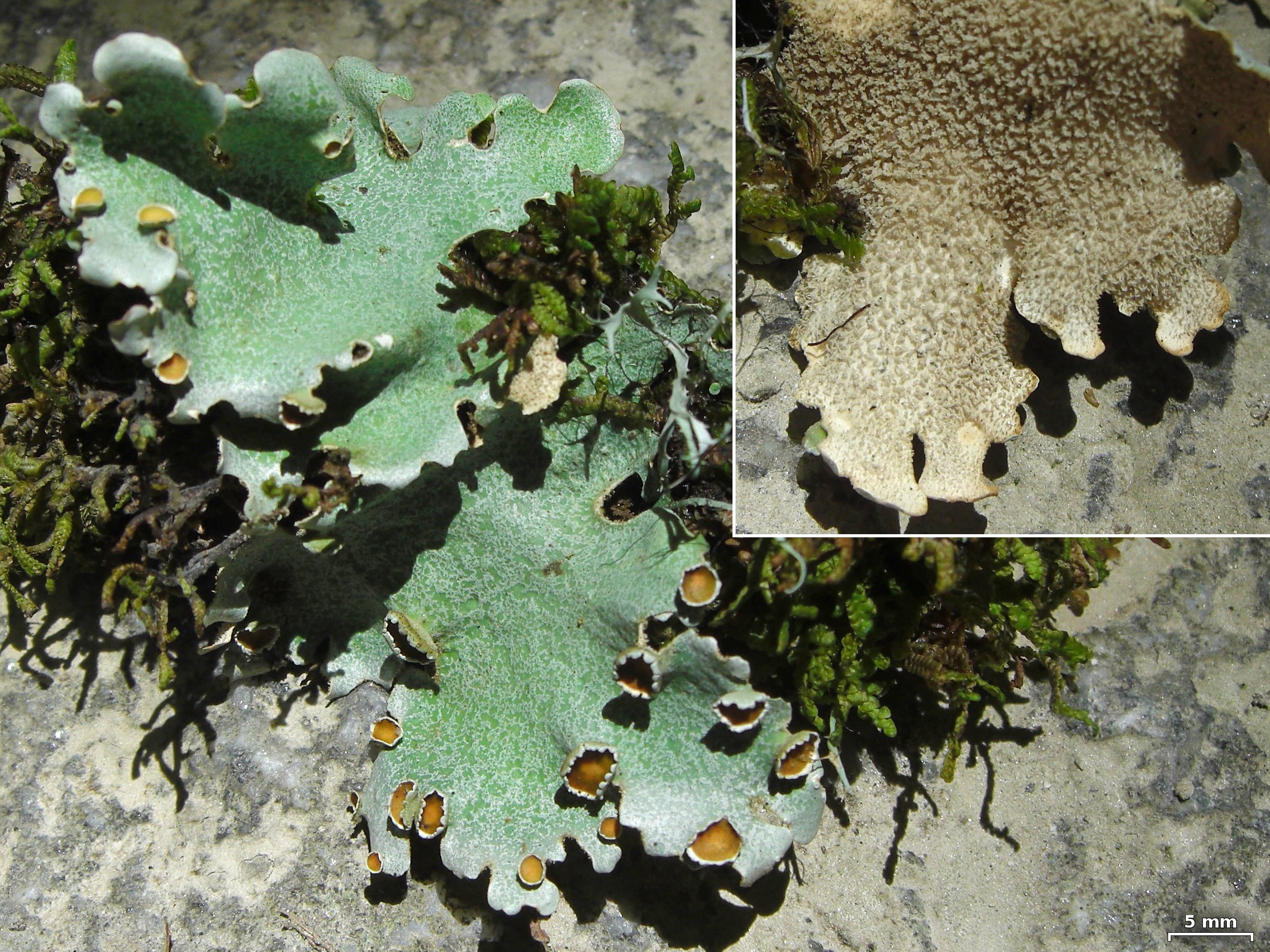

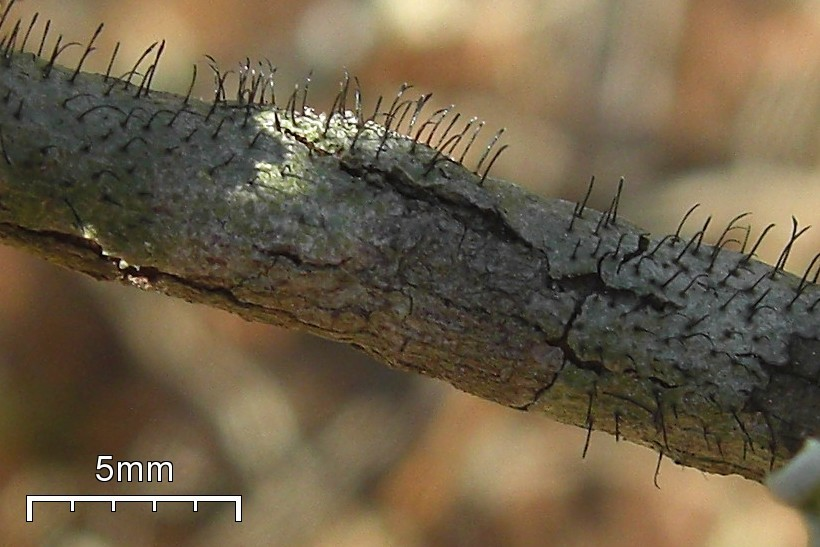

The lichen species Acanthotrema alboisidiatum (left; family Graphidaceae), Lobariella reticulata (centre; Peltigeraceae), and Gyalideopsis buckii (right; Gomphillaceae) are some of the many hundreds of taxa authored or co-authored by Lücking.

Lücking was the lead author of a 2020 study that documented the discovery and potential extinction of a new species of lichen, Cora timucua, identified through DNA analysis of museum specimens collected in Florida between 1885 and 1985. The research highlighted the critical endangerment of C. timucua, possibly extinct due to habitat loss, with its native pine scrub habitat largely replaced by urbanisation and agriculture. The study demonstrated the significance of digitised museum collections in uncovering previously misidentified species and emphasises the need to conserve remaining habitats to protect undiscovered or poorly understood lichen diversity.

Lücking is serving or has served on the editorial boards of some scientific journals, including The Bryologist, Mycosphere, and The Lichenologist.

== Research perspectives ==
Reflecting on developments in lichenology in a 2021 interview, Lücking said that the advent of molecular phylogenetics had reshaped how researchers draw evolutionary relationships and delimit species. He emphasised the value of collaborative, cross‑disciplinary work and welcomed the growing contribution of scientists from biodiversity‑rich countries.

Lücking added that forthcoming genomic studies should clarify the mechanisms of lichen symbiosis and refine ecological understanding. He expected continued growth in lichen taxonomy and systematics, alongside wider use of biomonitoring to track climate change effects. He also expressed hope that emerging technologies would better integrate herbarium specimens into phylogenetic and genomic research, unlocking historical ecological data. To early‑career lichenologists he recommended a strong grounding in taxonomy, competence in bioinformatics, and a questioning approach, coupled with open sharing of data and results.

== Eponymy ==
Several lichen species have been named to honour Lücking. These include: Aspidothelium lueckingii Flakus (2009); Byssoloma lueckingii Sérus. (1995); Calenia lueckingii C.Hartmann (1996); Chapsa lueckingii Kalb (2009); Coenogonium lueckingii Y.Joshi, Gagarina, J.P.Halda & Hur (2015); Dictyomeridium lueckingii Flakus & Aptroot (2016); Enterographa lueckingii Kalb (2001); Graphis lueckingiana S.Joshi, Upreti & Hur (2018); Graphis lueckingii Dal-Forno & Eliasaro (2010); Hypotrachyna lueckingii Sipman (2011); Kalbographa lueckingii Kalb (2009); Mazosia lueckingii Kr.P.Singh & Pinokiyo (2008); Palicella lueckingii Rodr.Flakus (2018); Pertusaria lueckingii Bungartz, A.W.Archer & Elix (2015); Phlyctis lueckingii Weerakoon & Aptroot (2016); Platygramme lueckingii Z.F.Jia & Kalb (2012); and Thelotrema lueckingii Breuss (2013). The genera Lueckingia Aptroot & Umaña (2008) and Rolueckia Papong, Thammath. & Boonpr. (2008) are also named after him.

== Selected publications ==
Lücking is a highly published scientist, and has formally described hundreds of lichens and other fungal taxa new to science. By the age of 44, he had published more than 160 scientific papers, about 100 of which he was the lead author. A few of his major or highly cited works include:

- Lücking, Robert; Buck, William R.; Plata, Eimy Rivas (2007). "The lichen family Gomphillaceae (Ostropales) in eastern North America, with notes on hyphophore development in Gomphillus and Gyalideopsis". The Bryologist. 110 (4): 622–672. doi:10.1639/0007-2745(2007)110[622:tlfgoi]2.0.co;2.
- Lücking, Robert; Lawrey, James D.; Sikaroodi, Masoumeh; Gillevet, Patrick M.; Chaves, José Luis; Sipman, Harrie J.M.; Bungartz, Frank (2009). "Do lichens domesticate photobionts like farmers domesticate crops? Evidence from a previously unrecognized lineage of filamentous cyanobacteria". American Journal of Botany. 96 (8): 1409–1418. doi:10.3732/ajb.0800258.
- Rivas Plata, Eimy; Lücking, Robert; Lumbsch, H. Thorsten (2011). "A new classification for the family Graphidaceae (Ascomycota: Lecanoromycetes: Ostropales)". Fungal Diversity. 52 (1): 107–121. doi:10.1007/s13225-011-0135-8.
- Lücking, Robert; Dal-Forno, Manuela; Sikaroodi, Masoumeh; Gillevet, Patrick M.; Bungartz, Frank; Moncada, Bibiana; et al. (2014). "A single macrolichen constitutes hundreds of unrecognized species". Proceedings of the National Academy of Sciences. 111 (30): 11091–11096. doi:10.1073/pnas.1403517111. PMC 4121827. PMID 24982168.
- Aptroot, André; Lücking, Robert (2016). "A revisionary synopsis of the Trypetheliaceae (Ascomycota: Trypetheliales)". The Lichenologist. 48 (6): 763–982. doi:10.1017/s0024282916000487.
- Lücking, Robert; Hodkinson, Brendan P.; Leavitt, Steven D. (2017). "The 2016 classification of lichenized fungi in the Ascomycota and Basidiomycota–Approaching one thousand genera". The Bryologist. 119 (4): 361–416. doi:10.1639/0007-2745-119.4.361. JSTOR 44250015.
- Hawksworth, David L.; Lücking, Robert (2017). "Fungal Diversity Revisited: 2.2 to 3.8 Million Species". Microbiology Spectrum. 5 (4): 1–17. doi:10.1128/microbiolspec.funk-0052-2016. PMC 11687528. PMID 28752818.
- Lücking, Robert; Aime, M. Catherine; Robbertse, Barbara; Miller, Andrew N.; Ariyawansa, Hiran A.; Aoki, Takayuki; et al. (2020). "Unambiguous identification of fungi: where do we stand and how accurate and precise is fungal DNA barcoding?". IMA Fungus. 11 (1): 14. doi:10.1186/s43008-020-00033-z. PMC 7353689. PMID 32714773.
- Lücking, Robert; Spribille, Toby (2024). The Lives of Lichens. A Natural History. Princeton and Oxford: Princeton University Press. pp. 1–288. ISBN 978-0-691-24727-4.

== See also ==
- Category:Taxa named by Robert Lücking
