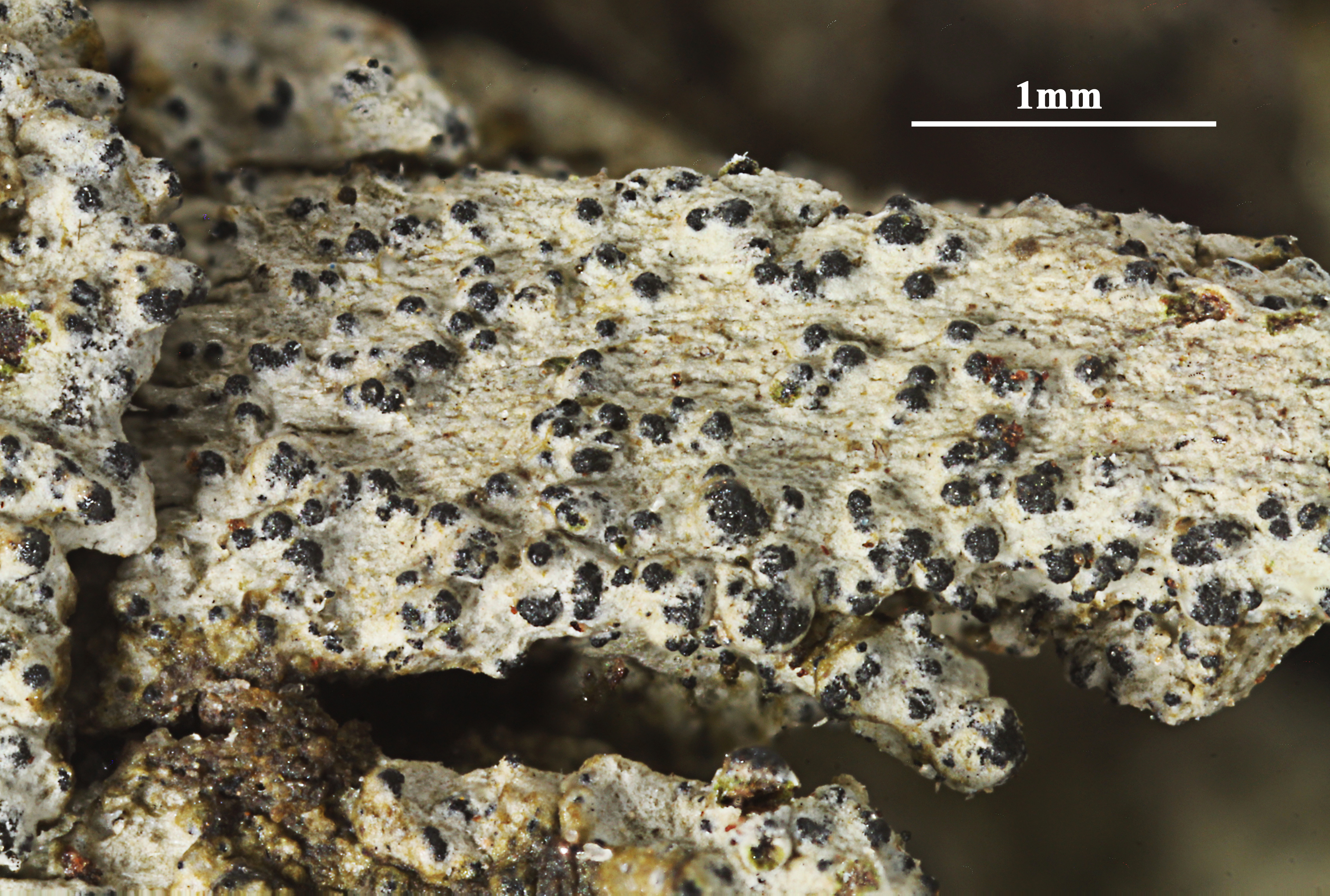
- Dichoporis ziziphi

Scientific classification
- Kingdom: Fungi
- Division: Ascomycota
- Class: Dothideomycetes
- Order: Strigulales
- Family: Strigulaceae
- Genus: Dichoporis; Clem. (1909)

Type species
- Dichoporis subsimplicans (Nyl.) S.H.Jiang, Lücking & Sérus. (2020)

Synonyms
- Diporina Clem. (1909)

= Dichoporis =

Genus of lichens

Dichoporis is a genus of lichen-forming fungi in the family Strigulaceae. It has about 20 species. It was established by American botanist Frederic Clements in 1909, with species growing as thin, often powdery or crust-like films on tree bark and exposed rocks in mostly tropical and subtropical regions. The genus was previously part of the broader genus Strigula until a 2020 revision recognized Dichoporis as a distinct lineage, characterized by one-celled ascospores that may pinch at the septum, macroconidia with gelatinous tails, and minute branched paraphyses inside the perithecia. All species form symbiotic relationships with green algae of the genus Trentpohlia, which provides the photosynthetic component of the lichen.

== Taxonomy ==
Dichoporis was established by the American botanist Frederic Clements in 1909, with Dichoporis schizospora—now treated as D. ziziphi—as the type species. In the same monograph Clements also coined the name Diporina for a closely similar assemblage, but the two genera were distinguished only by whether the ascospores split in two after leaving the ascus—a difference now regarded as trivial. Modern authors therefore retain Dichoporis as the preferred name and treat Diporina as a synonym.

A 2020 revision removed these species from the broad, catch-all concept of Strigula. The reshuffle recognised two distinct lines of non-leaf-dwelling lichens: Dichoporis and the newly erected Swinscowia. Species of Dichoporis share a characteristic package of features—one-celled (1-septate) ascospores that may pinch or fracture at the septum, macro-conidia with long (1–2 μm) gelatinous tails, and minute, often branched paraphyses inside the perithecia. Their closest relatives are thought to be the foliicolous genera Phylloporis and Phyllocratera, but those partners house a different green alga (Phycopeltis rather than Trentepohlia) and possess unbranched paraphyses, hinting at separate evolutionary histories. Until molecular data become available, Dichoporis is provisionally placed near the core Strigula clade within the family Strigulaceae.

Superficially, many Dichoporis species resemble members of the crust-forming genus Anisomeridium: both grow on bark or stone, develop black perithecia, and often produce one-septate spores. Anisomeridium, however, lacks the gelatinous-tailed conidia typical of Dichoporis, and its spores are generally broader and borne in asci that do not show the same two-layered fissitunicate construction. Moreover, the sterile filaments in Anisomeridium interweave to form a dense net, whereas those of Dichoporis remain comparatively loose. Careful microscopy is therefore essential when assigning specimens to one genus or the other.

== Description ==
Species of Dichoporis grow as thin, often powdery or crust-like films (thalli) on tree bark and exposed rocks in mostly tropical and subtropical regions, with only occasional records from temperate zones. The thallus lacks a protective outer skin (it is ecorticate) and ranges in colour from chalk-white to brown. All species partner with a green alga of the genus Trentepohlia, which forms the photosynthetic part of the lichen.

The sexual stage is expressed through perithecia—minute, usually black, flask-shaped fruiting bodies that sit flush with the thallus or protrude slightly like tiny warts. Perithecia are typically scattered, though they can crowd together densely, and are composed of carbonized (charcoal-like) walls that protect the developing spores. An outer carbonized sheath (the involucrellum) is present in most species, while the inner wall (the excipulum) is built from densely packed, pale to brown fungal cells. Thread-like sterile filaments (paraphyses) weave through the spore cavity, branching and sometimes linking to one another. Each spore-bearing sac (ascus) contains eight colourless ascospores and has a two-layered wall that splits open when mature (a bitunicate, fissitunicate ascus). The spores are smooth, slender to broadly oval, divided by a single thin cross-wall (septum) that often causes them to pinch in slightly—and older spores may break apart along this line.

Asexual reproduction is common in Dichoporis. Small black pimples in the thallus mark the position of pycnidia, chambers that release chains of tiny spores (conidia). Two conidial sizes occur: larger, one-septate macroconidia, which are rod-shaped and bear narrow, gelatinous tail-like appendages 1–2 μm wide, and much smaller, aseptate microconidia that are spindle-shaped. No characteristic secondary metabolitee (lichen products) have been detected in the genus.

== Species ==
- Dichoporis angustata (Cl.Roux & Sérus.) Cl.Roux (2023)
- Dichoporis bermudana (Tuck. ex Nyl.) S.H.Jiang, Lücking & Sérus. (2020)
- Dichoporis brevis (Bricaud & Cl.Roux) S.H.Jiang, Lücking & Sérus. (2020)
- Dichoporis connivens (R.C.Harris) S.H.Jiang, Lücking & Sérus. (2020)
- Dichoporis dichosporidii (Etayo) S.H.Jiang, Lücking & Sérus. (2020)
- Dichoporis elixii (P.M.McCarthy) S.H.Jiang, Lücking & Sérus. (2020)
- Dichoporis fractans (P.M.McCarthy) S.H.Jiang, Lücking & Sérus. (2020)
- Dichoporis maritima (H.Harada) S.H.Jiang, Lücking & Sérus. (2020)
- Dichoporis minor (Vězda) Cl.Roux (2023)
- Dichoporis minutula (P.M.McCarthy) S.H.Jiang, Lücking & Sérus. (2020)
- Dichoporis natalis (P.M.McCarthy) S.H.Jiang, Lücking & Sérus. (2020)
- Dichoporis nipponica (H.Harada) S.H.Jiang, Lücking & Sérus. (2020)
- Dichoporis occulta (P.M.McCarthy & Malcolm) S.H.Jiang, Lücking & Sérus. (2020)
- Dichoporis phaea (Ach.) S.H.Jiang, Lücking & Sérus. (2020)
- Dichoporis subprospersella (Vain.) S.H.Jiang, Lücking & Sérus. (2020)
- Dichoporis subsimplicans (Nyl.) S.H.Jiang, Lücking & Sérus. (2020)
- Dichoporis taylorii (Carroll ex Nyl.) S.H.Jiang, Lücking & Sérus. (2020)
- Dichoporis tenuis (R.C.Harris) S.H.Jiang, Lücking & Sérus. (2020)
- Dichoporis viridiseda (Nyl.) S.H.Jiang, Lücking & Sérus. (2020)
- Dichoporis wilsonii (Riddle) S.H.Jiang, Lücking & Sérus. (2020)
- Dichoporis ziziphi (A.Massal.) S.H.Jiang, Lücking & Sérus. (2020)
