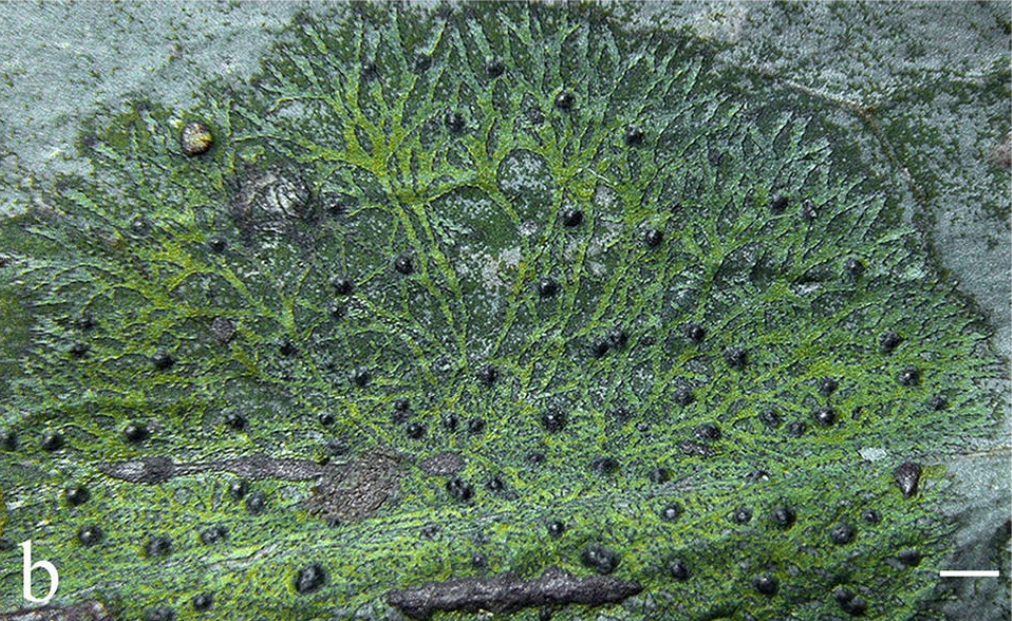
- scale bar: 600 micrometres

Scientific classification
- Kingdom: Fungi
- Division: Ascomycota
- Class: Dothideomycetes
- Order: Strigulales
- Family: Strigulaceae
- Genus: Racoplaca
- Species: R. melanobapha

Binomial name
- Racoplaca melanobapha (Kremp.) S.H.Jiang, Lücking & J.C.Wei (2020)

Synonyms
- Verrucaria melanobapha Kremp. (1874); Strigula melanobapha (Kremp.) R.Sant. (1952)

= Racoplaca melanobapha =

Species of lichen-forming fungus

Racoplaca melanobapha is a species of leaf-dwelling lichen in the family Strigulaceae. The species was first described in 1874 from a specimen collected in Borneo, though its taxonomic placement remained uncertain for many decades until it was transferred to the genus Strigula in 1952 and later to Racoplaca in 2020. It forms very thin, dark greyish-green patches on leaf surfaces, with narrow branching lobes outlined by fine black lines and scattered with tiny black dots. Molecular studies suggest that what has traditionally been treated as a single widespread tropical species may actually represent several closely related species that are difficult to distinguish by appearance alone.

== Taxonomy ==
Racoplaca melanobapha was originally described by August von Krempelhuber (1874) as Verrucaria melanobapha. In the original account, Krempelhuber regarded the taxon as somewhat doubtful and "fungoid", and its placement remained unsettled for decades. Johannes Müller Argoviensis later re-examined the type and suggested that it belonged near Strigula subtilissima, but other authors continued to list the species under Verrucaria or discussed it in connection with Phylloporina.

In his 1952 treatment of foliicolous lichens, Rolf Santesson transferred the species to Strigula as Strigula melanobapha and concluded that several described lookalikes were the same species. In particular, he interpreted the type of Strigula insignis and S. linearis as unusually fine material of S. melanobapha, and found that the type specimen selected for S. fibrillosa also belongs to S. melanobapha despite having been described as distinct on thallus characters. Santesson also pointed out that earlier attempts to separate members of this group using the reported identity of the symbiotic alga (e.g., Cephaleuros versus Phycopeltis) were not a secure basis for species separation in the type material. Modern classifications place the species in Racoplaca (Strigulaceae) as Racoplaca melanobapha.

In a multi-locus molecular phylogenetics study of foliicolous Strigula lichens, Jiang and co-authors used five genetic markers to reassess species limits and generic boundaries within Strigulaceae, including Racoplaca. In that work, they validated the combination Racoplaca melanobapha, noting that an earlier attempt to publish the name was invalid because the basionym had not been properly cited. The type of Verrucaria melanobapha is from Borneo, which anchors the name to Malesian material even though the species has often been discussed as a widespread tropical taxon in older literature.

Jiang and co-authors emphasised that many leaf-dwelling Strigulaceae once treated as widespread under broad, morphology-based species concepts have proven to contain multiple, sometimes morphologically cryptic lineages when analysed with molecular data. They suggested that this pattern is likely to be under-detected outside the regions that have been sampled so far, so historical "pantropical" distribution claims for named taxa should be treated with caution until verified using modern data. In their synthesis, they estimated that hidden diversity in traditionally "known" species ranges from about twofold to fivefold across the group; in the limited material assessed so far, Racoplaca melanobapha was among the taxa they considered to show roughly a twofold signal of such concealed diversity. This implies that some older records filed under R. melanobapha (or its earlier names) may represent more than one species, pending targeted sequencing from the relevant regions.

== Description ==
Racoplaca melanobapha is a leaf-dwelling species that forms a very thin thallus just beneath the leaf cuticle. The thallus is usually rounded and effigurate, typically 10–20 (sometimes to 25) mm across, and made up of narrow, more or less linear lobes (0.1–0.3 mm wide) that branch dichotomously and usually remain separate rather than forming a net. It is dark greyish green and often glossy, with a smooth to slightly wrinkled surface. The lobe margins are outlined by a fine black line (resembling a hypothallus), and the thallus commonly bears many tiny, evenly scattered black papillae (about 0.03 mm wide), usually spaced roughly 0.1 mm apart. In section, the thallus is very thin (about 10–16 μm), with a simple algal layer.

The species produces black, convex perithecia that spread slightly at the base, measuring 0.45–0.7 mm in diameter and about 150–250 μm high. The asci are narrowly club-shaped (60–110 × 6–10 μm) and contain eight ascospores that are typically 1-septate (rarely 3-septate), fusiform with pointed ends, and slightly pinched at the septum (14–22 × 3–5 μm). Pycnidia are also common; they are black and glossy, 0.2–0.3 mm in diameter, and produce simple, rod-shaped macroconidia (10–12 × 2–3 μm). Microconidia were not observed in the material described. The symbiotic alga was considered likely to be a Cephaleuros species, with rectangular to oblong cells 9–13 × 4–7 μm that often form continuous, radiating plates.

== Distribution ==
In his 1952 treatment, Santesson characterised Racoplaca melanobapha as a rare species with a scattered tropical range, and suggested it was "probably pantropical". He also remarked that records from the Americas were few, which he found striking for a taxon thought to occur widely in the tropics.

The material Santesson cited included a single Brazilian collection from Amazonas, together with records from Sierra Leone and from what was then the Belgian Congo (localities around Léopoldville, including Inkisi). In Asia and the western Pacific, he reported the species from Fujian in southeastern China (near Fuzhou on Gushan, 500–600 m), Sarawak (Borneo), Palawan in the Philippines, and New Guinea (including Goroka at about 1,300 m, and Valsche Pisangs Island off western New Guinea). Santesson also noted additional published Chinese reports that he treated as unverified. More recent records have extended its distribution to include Kenya, Tanzania, India (Western Ghats), Sri Lanka, Hawaii, Micronesia, and South Korea. Modern fieldwork has reconfirmed its presence in the Democratic Republic of the Congo and elaborated a more widespread presence in Brazil.
