= Swinscowia bispora =

Scientific classification
- Kingdom: Fungi
- Division: Ascomycota
- Class: Dothideomycetes
- Order: Strigulales
- Family: Strigulaceae
- Genus: Swinscowia
- Species: S. bispora

Binomial name
- Swinscowia bispora (Aptroot & K.H.Moon) S.H.Jiang, Lücking & Sérus. (2020)
- Holotype: Juwangsan, Korea

Synonyms
- Strigula bispora Aptroot & K.H.Moon (2014)

Species of lichen

Swinscowia bispora is a species of corticolous (bark-dwelling) lichen in the family Strigulaceae. Described as new to science in 2014, it is found in Korea. This lichen forms a thin, smooth, metallic grey film up to about 5 cm across on oak tree bark, with small black rounded fruiting bodies that are partially buried in the bark surface. It is distinguished by having only two very large ascospores in each spore sac, unlike most lichens which typically contain eight smaller spores.

== Taxonomy ==
The lichen was formally described as a new species in 2014 by the lichenologists André Aptroot and Kwang-Hee Moon as a member of genus Strigula. The type specimen was collected from Juwangsan (North Gyeongsang Province) at an altitude between 320 and 380 m (1,050 and 1,250 ft); there, it was found growing on the bark on an oak tree. The taxon was transferred to the genus Swinscowia in 2020 following a molecular phylogenetics-led reorganisation of families and genera in the order Dothideomycetes. The species epithet bispora refers to the fact that each ascus contain two ascospores.

== Description ==
Swinscowia bispora is a bark-dwelling (corticolous) lichen that forms a thin, closely adherent film up to roughly 5 cm across. The surface lacks a protective outer skin (cortex) yet appears smooth, faintly glossy, and metallic grey, with no pale breathing spots (pseudocyphellae) and no dark marginal line (prothallus). Its photosynthetic partner is a filamentous green alga of the genus Trentepohlia, whose cells measure about 10–15 μm in diameter.

Reproductive bodies are single, rounded perithecia 0.4–0.8 mm wide. These sit partly buried in the bark and break through when mature, their upper half turning jet black and carbon-hard. Each perithecial wall is about 20 μm thick and ends in a tiny black pore (ostiole) for spore release. Inside, a pale ochre matrix of slender filaments (the hamathecium) surrounds two large ascospores borne in every ascus. The spores are colourless, densely divided by many internal walls (muriform), ellipsoidal, and quite large—around 120–130 μm long and 40–45 μm wide—with a brick-like appearance under the microscope. No separate asexual structures (pycnidia) have been observed, and spot tests for secondary metabolites are negative, with thin-layer chromatography likewise revealing no detectable lichen substances.
