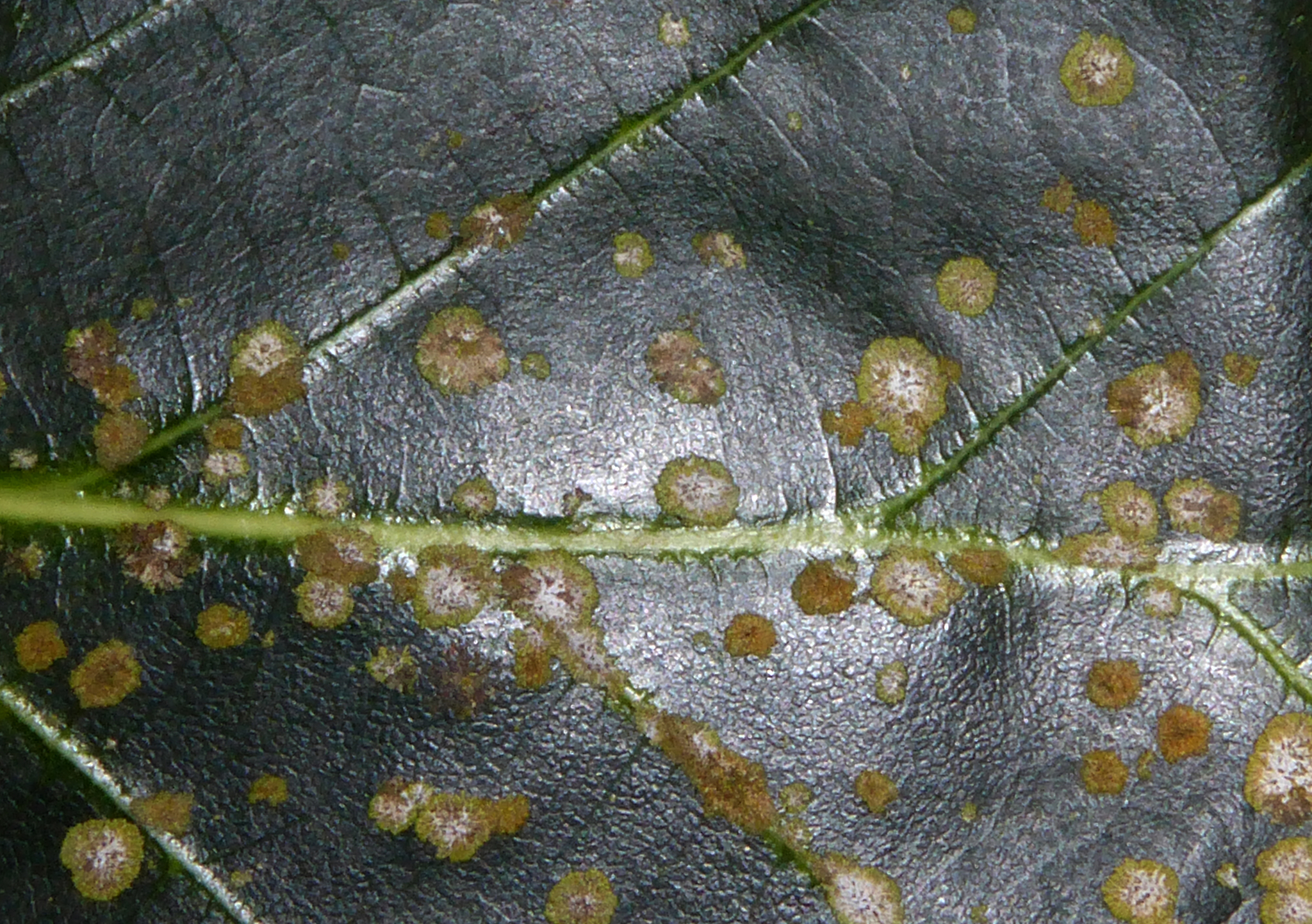
- Subcuticular thallus patches of Phyllocharis orbicularis on leaf surface

Scientific classification
- Kingdom: Fungi
- Division: Ascomycota
- Class: Dothideomycetes
- Order: Strigulales
- Family: Strigulaceae
- Genus: Phyllocharis; Fée (1825)
- Species: P. orbicularis

Binomial name
- Phyllocharis orbicularis (Fr.) S.H.Jiang, Lücking & Sérus. (2020)

Synonyms
- Strigula orbicularis Fr. (1830); Phyllocharis complanata Fée (1825); Strigula complanata (Fée) Mont. (1845)

= Phyllocharis orbicularis =

Single-species lichen genus

Phyllocharis orbicularis is a leaf-dwelling lichen in the family Strigulaceae. It is the only known species in the fungal genus Phyllocharis. The genus was originally erected by Antoine Fée in 1825; in its modern circumscription its sole species, P. orbicularis, is based on a lichen first described by Elias Magnus Fries in 1830. This leaf-dwelling lichen grows beneath the surface layer of leaves in tropical and subtropical regions, forming pale grey-green patches from lowland to mountain forests. It has a wide pantropical distribution, recorded from the Americas (including Costa Rica, Bolivia, Colombia, Suriname, Argentina, and Florida), as well as from Australia, the Philippines, Vietnam, India, and Kenya. The species is distinguished by its transparent three-celled ascospores and uniquely long, thread-like asexual spores.

== Taxonomy ==
Phyllocharis is a genus that was originally introduced by Antoine Fée in 1825 in his work Essai sur les cryptogames écorcées. In a 2020 revision of foliicolous (leaf-dwelling) members of the Strigulaceae, Shu-Hua Jiang, Robert Lücking and Emmanuël Sérusiaux resurrected Phyllocharis and circumscribed it around a single, morphologically delimited species, and at the time of that work there were no molecular data available to support its placement.

Fée originally designated Phyllocharis complanata as the type species. In the current circumscription, that name is treated as equivalent to Phyllocharis orbicularis (Fr.) S.H.Jiang, Lücking & Sérus., so that P. orbicularis functions as both the only recognised species and the type of the genus. The new combination Phyllocharis orbicularis is based on Fries's Strigula orbicularis, described in 1830.

The decision by Jiang, Lücking and Sérusiaux to resurrect Phyllocharis is grounded in its morphology. The species has hyaline, 3-septate ascospores that differ from those of all other foliicolous, subcuticularly growing genera, and unusually long, filiform (thread-like) macroconidia that are unique within the family as presently understood. On the basis of these ascospore and macroconidial features, Jiang, Lücking and Sérusiaux predicted that "Strigula" orbicularis will fall in a clade together with Flavobathelium, Phyllobathelium and Swinscowia once reliable sequence data become available. An internal transcribed spacer (ITS) sequence published for S. orbicularis from Indian material (GenBank KU509981) was later shown to be a contaminant belonging to the genus Aspergillus, so at the time of publication there was still no genuine molecular sequence for Phyllocharis.

There is also a nomenclatural issue involving homonymy: Fée's Phyllocharis predates a later use of the same name by Ludwig Diels for a plant genus in Lobeliaceae. The plant name was proposed for conservation, but that proposal was not accepted, so Fée's fungal generic name remains available.

== Description ==
Phyllocharis orbicularis is a lichen forming thalli on leaves in which the fungal partner is associated with the green alga Cephaleuros as photobiont. The thallus is more or less corticate to pseudo-corticate, pale grey-green in colour, and typically forms just beneath the leaf cuticle. This subcuticular growth can sometimes result in visible damage to the supporting leaf tissue.

The sexual morph produces ascomata (fruiting bodies) in the form of perithecia. These fruiting bodies are prominent and black, but are largely covered by the overlying thallus layer, so that they appear as wart-like, carbonaceous, ostiolate swellings. Each perithecium has an involucrellum that is present but only weakly carbonised, and an excipulum composed of brownish prosoplectenchyma. The hamathecium consists of slender, hyaline paraphyses, about 0.5–0.7 μm wide, which are flexuose and unbranched. Asci are 8-spored, bitunicate and fissitunicate, obclavate to fusiform in shape, with a short stalk and a narrow ocular chamber, and they do not show an amyloid reaction. The ascospores are arranged irregularly to biseriately in the asci; they are oblong, hyaline and 3-septate, with thin true septa (eusepta) and rectangular internal lumina, and have smooth walls.

The asexual morph is well developed. Pycnidia are common, occurring immersed in the thallus to erumpent and visible at the surface as small black dots. They produce acrogenous conidia of two types, macroconidia and microconidia. The macroconidia are long, filiform spores with 3–9 septa and gelatinous appendages, and they are hyaline. The microconidia are aseptate, fusiform, small and likewise hyaline. No lichen secondary metabolites are known from Phyllocharis on the basis of chemical studies.

== Habitat and distribution ==
Phyllocharis orbicularis is a foliicolous lichen, growing on leaves in terrestrial habitats. It occurs from lowland to montane sites in tropical to subtropical regions, where it forms subcuticular thalli within the leaf surface. The lichen has a wide pantropical distribution. In the Americas it is known from Costa Rica, Bolivia, Colombia, Suriname, Argentina, and Florida in the United States. It has also been recorded from Australia, the Philippines, Vietnam, India, and Kenya.
