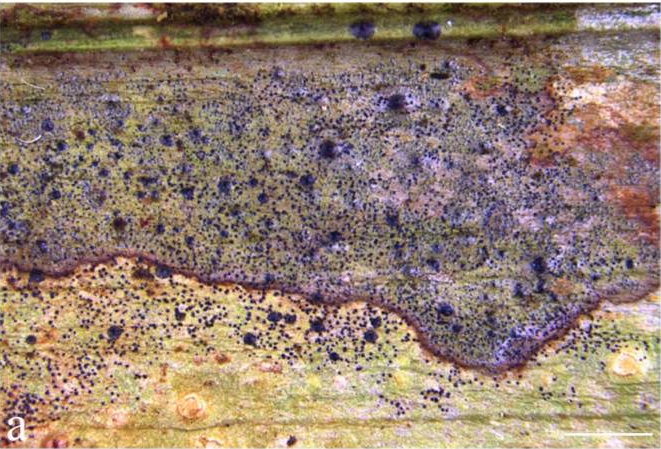
- Phylloporis palmae

Scientific classification
- Kingdom: Fungi
- Division: Ascomycota
- Class: Dothideomycetes
- Order: Strigulales
- Family: Strigulaceae
- Genus: Phylloporis; Clem. (1909)

Type species
- Phylloporis phyllogena (Müll.Arg.) Clem. (1909)

Synonyms
- Porinomyces Bat. (1967); Didymaster Bat. & H.Maia (1967); Manaustrum Cavalc. & A.A.Silva (1972); Porina sect. Sagediastrum Müll.Arg. (1883)

= Phylloporis =

Genus of lichens

Phylloporis is a genus of lichen-forming fungi in the family Strigulaceae. It comprises seven species that are primarily found growing on leaves, with occasional occurrences on bark or on rocks.

== Taxonomy ==
The genus Phylloporis was originally established by Frederic Clements in 1909, primarily to accommodate species with a foliicolous (leaf-dwelling) growth habit. Despite this, the genus was later merged into Strigula by some taxonomists due to shared anatomical characteristics, such as ascus type and internal anatomy. This broad generic concept was challenged by subsequent studies, which emphasised differences in thallus morphology and substrate preference. These distinctions have led to the resurrection of Phylloporis as a separate genus, supported by molecular phylogenetics evidence presented by Jiang and colleagues in 2020.

Currently, Phylloporis is recognised as a basally diverging lineage among the foliicolous clades of Strigula sensu lato (in the loose sense). Its supracuticular (surface-dwelling) thallus, in contrast to the subcuticular growth seen in other clades, is thought to be an ancestral trait shared with genera such as Flavobathelium and Phyllobathelium. This supports the view that Phylloporis represents a distinct evolutionary lineage, distinct from Strigula.

== Description ==
The vegetative body, or thallus, of Phylloporis lacks a protective outer layer (ecorticate) and is typically grey-green to grey in colour, forming a layer over its substrate. This genus associates with the green algal genus Phycopeltis as its photobiont, which provides photosynthetic capabilities.

Phylloporis produces sexual structures known as perithecia, which are specialised, rounded to conical fruiting bodies. These black structures can either erupt through the surface of the thallus or remain prominent and covered by the thallus layer. The perithecia are carbonaceous (composed of a hard, blackened material) and ostiolate, meaning they have a small opening (ostiole) for spore release. Surrounding the perithecia is a hardened outer covering, the involucrellum, which is also carbonised. The excipulum, or the layer of tissue beneath the involucrellum, has a net-like texture (prosoplectenchymatous) and is dark brown to blackish.

Inside the perithecia, the hamathecium—consisting of thread-like, unbranched paraphyses—is colourless (hyaline) and slightly flexible. These structures are extremely fine, measuring only 0.5–0.7 μm in width. The asci (spore sacs) are bitunicate, meaning they have two functional layers that assist in spore release, and contain eight spores each. These asci are cylindrical, with a short stalk (pedicel) and a narrow ocular chamber at the tip, and they do not react to iodine staining (non-amyloid). The spores are fusiform to ellipsoid, hyaline, and divided into two cells (uniseptate). They feature smooth walls and a slight constriction at the central septum.

The genus also produces asexual reproductive structures, the pycnidia, which appear as small, black dots on the thallus. These structures often dominate thalli, which may produce only pycnidia. The spores produced in these structures, known as conidia, can be of two types: macroconidia and microconidia. Macroconidia are larger, ellipsoid to rod-shaped (bacillar), and uniseptate, often with gelatinous appendages. In contrast, microconidia are smaller, ellipsoid to spindle-shaped (fusiform), and lack septa. Both types of conidia are transparent (hyaline). No secondary metabolites or lichen-specific chemicals have been identified in Phylloporis.

== Habitat and distribution ==
Phylloporis species are primarily found growing on leaves, with occasional occurrences on bark or rocks. They inhabit terrestrial environments ranging from lowland regions to montane zones within tropical and subtropical climates.

== Species ==
As of January 2025, Species Fungorum (in the Catalogue of Life) accept seven species of Phylloporis:

- Phylloporis austropunctata (P.M.McCarthy) S.H.Jiang, Lücking & J.C.Wei (2020)
- Phylloporis cinefaciens (Nyl.) S.H.Jiang, Lücking & Sérus. (2020)
- Phylloporis hypothallina (R.C.Harris) S.H.Jiang, Lücking & Sérus. (2020)
- Phylloporis palmae (Cavalc. & A.A.Silva) S.H.Jiang, Xavier-Leite & Lücking (2021)
- Phylloporis phyllogena (Müll.Arg.) Clem. (1909)
- Phylloporis radiata (Lücking) S.H.Jiang, Lücking & J.C.Wei (2020)
- Phylloporis vulgaris (Müll.Arg.) S.H.Jiang, Lücking & J.C.Wei (2020)
