= Raciborskiella =

Scientific classification
- Kingdom: Fungi
- Division: Ascomycota
- Class: Dothideomycetes
- Order: Strigulales
- Family: Strigulaceae
- Genus: Raciborskiella; Höhn. (1909)

Type species
- Raciborskiella talaumae (Racib.) Höhn. (1909)

Species
- R. talaumae R. janeirensis

Genus of lichens

Raciborskiella is a genus of foliicolous (leaf-dwelling) lichens in the family Strigulaceae. Characterized by their thin, dark bluish-grey thalli, these lichens form distinctive patches on leaf surfaces and develop between the leaf cuticle and epidermal cells. The genus was originally proposed by Franz Höhnel in 1909, later merged with Strigula, and then reinstated as a separate genus in 2020 based on molecular phylogenetics studies. Raciborskiella species are distinguished by their exposed, black perithecia, large ascospores with gelatinous appendages, and association with the green algal photobiont Cephaleuros. The genus has a pantropical distribution, with two recognized species.

== Taxonomy ==
Raciborskiella is a genus of foliicolous lichens in the family Strigulaceae. It was originally described by Franz Xaver Rudolf von Höhnel in 1909, with Raciborskiella talaumae designated as the type species. The genus was initially kept separate from Strigula by Rolf Santesson (1952) and subsequent researchers, but was later subsumed within Strigula by Richard Harris (1995), a classification followed in many major works.

Molecular phylogenetics studies by Jiang and colleagues (2020) demonstrated that Raciborskiella represents a distinct lineage within Strigulaceae, characterized by its own unique morphological features. This led to the reinstatement of Raciborskiella as a separate genus. The genus is distinguished by its very thin, dark bluish-grey thalli that form dispersed patches and grow hypophyllously (on leaf undersides), carbonized perithecial walls, large ascospores (30–70 μm long) with terminal gelatinous appendages, and slightly branched and anastomosing paraphyses.

Not all species previously classified in Raciborskiella belong in this genus. For example, Strigula prasina, which was once included in Raciborskiella due to its hypophyllous growth, was shown to be phylogenetically distinct and remains classified within Strigula.

== Description ==
Raciborskiella lichens are characterized by their distinctive growth habit on the underside (hypophyllous) of leaves in tropical forest environments. They form very thin, dark bluish-grey patches that appear as dispersed, rounded to partly confluent areas on the leaf surface. These lichens grow subcuticularly, developing between the cuticle and epidermal cells of the host leaf. The thallus (lichen body) is notably thin, typically 7–15 μm thick, with a dark grey-green to bluish grey colouration. Raciborskiella species associate with photobionts belonging to the green algal genus Cephaleuros, which forms irregular groups or threads of angular-rounded cells arranged in one or several layers.

The reproductive structures (perithecia) are fully exposed, prominent, and typically shaped like warts or cones. They measure 0.3–0.6 mm in diameter and 60–150 μm in height, with a characteristic black colouration. These perithecia are not covered by thallus tissue. The internal structure reveals a colourless, prosoplectenchymatous excipulum surrounded by a carbonized (blackened), thick involucrellum.

A distinctive feature of Raciborskiella is its large ascospores, measuring 30–70 μm in length and 5–7 μm in width. These ascospores are fusiform (spindle-shaped), colourless, 1-septate, and strongly constricted at the septum. They often break into part-spores within the asci and sometimes display thin, gelatinous appendages at both ends. The species also produce bacillar to filiform, 1-septate macroconidia with short to medium-sized gelatinous appendages. No secondary metabolites (lichen products) have been detected in Raciborskiella species by thin-layer chromatography.

== Habitat and distribution ==
Raciborskiella species are specialized foliicolous lichens that grow primarily on the undersides of leaves in humid tropical and subtropical forest environments. They form characteristic thin, bluish-grey patches that are adapted to the lower light conditions found on leaf undersides, where they grow subcuticularly (beneath the leaf cuticle). The genus has a pantropical distribution pattern. Raciborskiella talaumae appears to be primarily eastern paleotropical, with documented occurrences in Indonesia (Java) and mainland China, where it is found in humid, semi-exposed forest habitats. In contrast, Raciborskiella janeirensis has a primarily neotropical distribution, being reported from countries including Brazil, Guiana, and Peru.

== Species ==
- Raciborskiella talaumae (Racib.) Höhn. (1909)
- Raciborskiella zollerniae Bat. & J.A.Lima (1961)
