= Serusiauxiella =

Scientific classification
- Kingdom: Fungi
- Division: Ascomycota
- Class: Dothideomycetes
- Order: Strigulales
- Family: Strigulaceae
- Genus: Serusiauxiella; S.H.Jiang, Lücking & J.C.Wei (2020)

Type species
- Serusiauxiella filifera S.H.Jiang, Lücking & J.C.Wei (2020)

Species
- S. filifera S. flagellata S. sinensi

Genus of fungi

Serusiauxiella is a genus of leaf-dwelling lichens in the family Strigulaceae. It has three species, all of which are found in wet tropical forests in China. The genus was circumscribed in 2020 by Shu-Hua Jiang, Robert Lücking, and Jiang-Chu Wei, with Serusiauxiella filifera assigned as the type species. The genus name honours Belgian lichenologist Emmanuël Sérusiaux, "in recognition of his important contributions to lichenology, foliicolous lichens and the genus Strigula".

The three species in the genus are characterised by having macroconidia with appendages that rapidly elongate (up to 70 μm) after waiting up to 1 hour in microscope slide preparations called squash mounts. The photobiont partner is a green alga of the genus Trentepohlia. This is unlike the related genus Strigula, which has Cephaleuros as the photobiont.

== Species ==
- Serusiauxiella filifera S.H.Jiang, Lücking & J.C.Wei (2020) – southern China
- Serusiauxiella flagellata S.H.Jiang, Lücking & J.C.Wei (2020) – South China
- Serusiauxiella sinensi S.H.Jiang, Lücking & J.C.Wei (2020) – South China
