= Oletheriostrigula =

Scientific classification
- Kingdom: Fungi
- Division: Ascomycota
- Class: Dothideomycetes
- Order: Strigulales
- Family: Strigulaceae
- Genus: Oletheriostrigula; Huhndorf & R.C.Harris (1996)
- Species: O. papulosa

Binomial name
- Oletheriostrigula papulosa (Durieu & Mont.) Huhndorf & R.C.Harris (1996)

Synonyms
- Sphaeria papulosa Durieu & Mont. (1848); Leptosphaeria papulosa (Durieu & Mont.) Sacc. (1875); Metasphaeria papulosa (Durieu & Mont.) Sacc. (1883); Sphaerulina papulosa (Durieu & Mont.) Cooke (1890); Massarina papulosa (Durieu & Mont.) S.K.Bose (1961); Leptosphaerella jubaeae Speg. (1921)

Single-species lichen genus

Oletheriostrigula is a fungal genus in the family Strigulaceae. It comprises the single species Oletheriostrigula papulosa. This microscopic fungus was first described in 1848 and has undergone several taxonomic reclassifications before being placed in its own genus in 1996. Unlike the vast majority of the Strigulaceae, O. papulosa does not form a symbiotic relationship with algae. It produces small, spherical fruiting bodies (ascomata) that grow on dead plant material, particularly on plants with durable or persistent leaves. The fungus has a widespread distribution, favouring warm climates, and plays a role in decomposition processes. O. papulosa is characterised by its unique combination of morphological features, including apically free paraphyses with bulbous tips, and its ability to produce both sexual and asexual spores.

== Taxonomy ==
Oletheriostrigula is a monospecific genus of non lichen-forming fungi, containing the single species Oletheriostrigula papulosa. The genus was erected in 1996 by the mycologists Sabine Huhndorf and Richard C. Harris to accommodate the species previously known as Massarina papulosa. This species was originally described by the French mycologists Michel Charles Durieu de Maisonneuve and Camille Montagne in 1848; they classified it in the genus Sphaeria. The taxon was shuffled to various genera over the next decades of its taxonomic history, including Leptosphaeria, Metasphaeria, Sphaerulina, Leptosphaerella, and Massarina.

The genus name Oletheriostrigula reflects its close relationship to the lichen genus Strigula, while also indicating its non-lichenised nature. Unlike Strigula species, which form symbiotic relationships with algae, Oletheriostrigula does not contain photosynthetic partners and is therefore not considered a true lichen.

Oletheriostrigula is placed within the family Strigulaceae, which primarily consists of lichenised fungi. It is notable for being the only non-lichenised member of this family. The genus shares several characteristics with Strigula, including:

- Subcuticular growth habit on coriaceous (leathery) leaves
- Similar ascus and ascospore shapes
- Presence of apically free paraphyses (sterile filaments between the asci)
- Conidial septation patterns

However, Oletheriostrigula differs from Strigula in its lack of lichenisation and some specific morphological features. The placement of this species in its own genus was necessitated by its unique combination of characteristics, particularly the presence of apically free paraphyses with slightly bulbous tips, which is incompatible with its previous placement in the genus Massarina.

== Description ==
Oletheriostrigula papulosa is a microscopic fungus that, despite its classification within a family of predominantly lichens, does not form a symbiotic relationship with algae, setting it apart from true lichens. The fungus manifests as small, rounded structures called ascomata, which are nearly spherical in shape, measuring 170–250 μm in diameter and 130–230 μm in height. These ascomata are thickly scattered across the plant surface, appearing either individually or in small groups, and are surrounded by pale brown fungal threads known as hyphae. Each ascoma features a short, broad, rounded protrusion called a papilla that contains a circular opening (an ostiole) through which spores are released.

The internal structure of the ascoma is complex, with an ascomatal wall composed of small, polygonal to elongated cells. This wall is 20–32 μm thick, becoming thicker near the apex, with outer layers that are brown and inner layers that are colourless, or hyaline. Within the ascoma, thin, thread-like structures called paraphyses can be found between the spore-producing sacs. These paraphyses narrow from 2.5–3 μm at the base to 1 μm at the tip, which is slightly bulbous. The spore-producing sacs (asci) are obovate in shape, resembling an egg with the narrow end at the base. They measure 51–81 μm in length and 11.4–17.1 μm in width, are thick-walled with a rounded, thickened apex, and possess a double wall, a feature described as bitunicate. Each ascus contains eight spores arranged in one to three rows.

The reproductive spores (ascospores) of O. papulosa are fusiform to clavate-oblong in shape, wider at one end and tapering at the other. They measure 18.5–26.5 μm in length and 5.6–9.6 μm in width. These spores are colourless to nearly colourless and are usually divided by four (occasionally five) cross-walls called septa. A characteristic feature is the constriction at the middle septum and the thickened outer wall surrounding the spore, which appears sheath-like. In addition to its sexual reproductive structures, O. papulosa can also produce an asexual stage known as a Diplodia state. This stage forms simpler spores called conidia and has been observed both in laboratory cultures and occasionally on host plant tissues in nature.

== Habitat, distribution, and ecology ==
Oletheriostrigula papulosa is a widespread fungus that inhabits dead plant material, particularly favouring plants with durable or persistent leaves. This fungus is commonly found growing on dead stems and leaves of various host plants, where it plays a role in the decomposition process. The species shows a preference for warm climates, suggesting a primarily tropical to subtropical distribution. However, its exact geographical range has not been fully documented. It has been reported from diverse locations, including Algeria, where it was first described, and California in the United States.

Oletheriostrigula papulosa papulosa demonstrates a broad host range, colonising a variety of plant species. It has been observed on both evergreen and deciduous plants, but seems to favour those with tough, long-lasting foliage. Some of the documented host plants include species of Ilex (holly), Washingtonia (fan palms), and Yucca. Other reported hosts encompass a wide range of plant families, including citrus (Citrus aurantium), ivy (Hedera helix), fan palm (Chamaerops humilis), and various conifers such as Araucaria imbricata.

The fungus does not appear to cause significant damage to living plant tissues, as it is primarily found on dead or dying parts of its host plants. This suggests that O. papulosa functions as a saprobe, an organism that obtains its nutrients from dead organic matter. In this ecological role, it likely contributes to nutrient cycling in its habitat by breaking down complex plant materials.

The ability of O. papulosa to produce both sexual (ascospores) and asexual (conidia) spores potentially allows it to disperse and colonize new substrates efficiently. This dual reproductive strategy, combined with its ability to thrive on a wide range of host plants, likely contributes to its ecological success and widespread distribution in suitable habitats.
