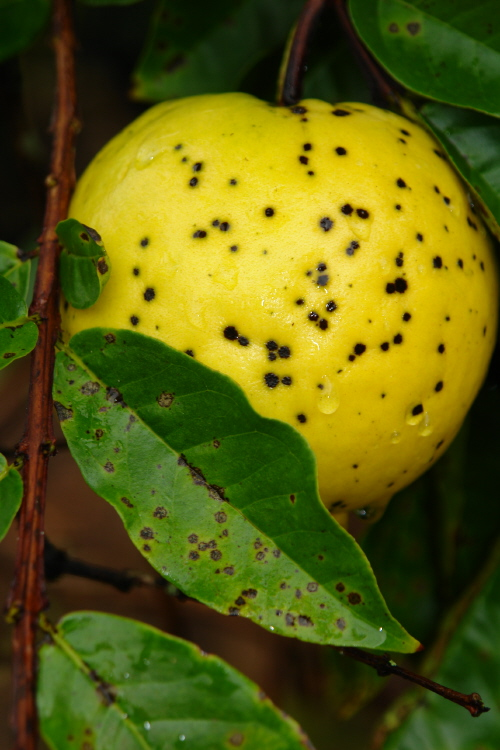
- Cephaleuros parasiticus on guava

Scientific classification
- Clade: Viridiplantae
- Division: Chlorophyta
- Class: Ulvophyceae
- Order: Trentepohliales
- Family: Trentepohliaceae
- Genus: Cephaleuros
- Species: C. parasiticus

Binomial name
- Cephaleuros parasiticus Karsten

= Cephaleuros parasiticus =

Plant pathogenic species of green algae

Cephaleuros parasiticus is a plant pathogenic member of the chlorophyta, or green algae. It infects several commercially important crops including tea. Unlike the majority of pathogenic Cephaleuros species, it penetrates the epidermis of plants and is not constrained to subcuticular growth. It has sometimes been misidentified as Cephaleuros virescens. Cortex penetration and the name red rust of tea are marked differentiators of C. parasiticus from its relative C. virescens, which does not penetrate the epidermis. It has been renamed several times as more phylogenetic information has become available.

== General biology ==
Cephaleuros parasiticus consists irregularly branching prostrate filaments, which form a round mass just underneath the epidermis of a leaf. From the prostrate filaments, a rhizoidal growth is produced which penetrates between the palisade cells and grows near the stomata.

Sporangiophores (which bear the asexually reproductive structures) occur singly or in tufts of 3-7, leading to the death of the stomata which they grow near. They consists of four to 11 cells, with a terminal head cell that has numerous whorls of "sporangiate-laterals". Sporangiate-laterals contain the zoosporangia which produce zoospores. Gametangia are produced beneath the upper epidermis, and/or with the sporangiophores in the lower epidermis.

One variety is known and is named var. nana. It differs from the typical variety (var. parasiticus) in that the lesions produced are more irregular, the sporangiophores are shorter (usually with two cells), and the head cells may produce an additional whorl of sporangiophores.

=== Symptoms and hosts ===
Red rust is known to infect other plants, including mango, coffee, citrus, and guava. It should not be confused with either the fungal coffee leaf rust, a basidiomycete rust; or with coffee red leaf spot, caused by the related C. virescens. Similar symptoms and pathogenesis seem to be present on all hosts.

Cephaleuros parasiticus can penetrate the epidermis, although spores more readily spread through wounds. It proceeds to invade the cortical tissue in the stem. On the upper surface of the leaf, the spot is dark red-brown to purple-black, up to 25 mm in diameter. At first, the spot is yellow to green and irregularly cushion-like, but then becomes white from the dead epidermis cells. The lower surface of the spot is equally sized, with dark brown dead leaf tissue. In leaves, the rust causes chlorosis and variegation, which might be surrounded by anthocyanescence. In humid conditions, red-orange filamentous growth may emerge on wounds; these are the crowded sporangiophores. The most extreme symptoms produce necrotic patches on the stem. Repeated infection cycles result in permanently reduced yields mortality, especially in younger plants.

=== Life cycle ===
The algae has a latent period of roughly a year following the initial infection of damaged tissue. After this time, it will begin fruiting during rainy periods. It disperses as both motile zoospores, and also through wind-borne sporangium. Wind and rain are mechanisms of this dispersal.

== Economic importance ==
The disease is increasingly a concern in tea plantations throughout the Indian subcontinent and Sri Lanka in recent decades. It is also present in Chinese tea plantations, although apparently to a lesser extent. In some cases, it can necessitate large-scale replanting, which are especially vulnerable to C. parasiticus. It may present in up to one-quarter of all tea plantations in Bangladesh, and is one of the major threats to the tea plantation industry. It has long been identified as a concern for the industry, with publications dating back to 1907. Already weakened plants, suffering from nutrient stress or damage caused by mechanical harvesters, are at heightened risk of severe infections. It is possible for otherwise healthy plants to develop an infection as well. The National Bank for Agriculture and Rural Development in India recommends the use of pesticides in the establishment of new tea plantations.

== Management ==
The use of mechanical tea harvesters can increase the losses caused by this pathogen, as wounds on the plants allow for aggravated pathogenesis and eventual loss of the plant. As an algae, various agents including detergents and fungicides are mostly ineffective in controlling the disease. A mixture of urea and muriate of potash can also be applied via spraying. Tolerant cultivars are also being developed to reduce loss, although no resistant cultivars currently exist. Cultural practices such as eliminating weed shade and maintaining soil health have also been mentioned as important for the management of C. parasiticus. The mechanism of resistance from potash spraying is related to vigorous plant growth, as potash is an important nutrient for tea plants. The use of potash in conjunction with bordeaux spraying reduced the severity of the algae's impact on crop yields. This is supported by findings that vigorous growth in young plants reduces the severity of an infection. Spraying with copper-based fungicides up to three times throughout the summer, especially as the alga sporulates, can control the disease. Pruning infected branches can also help plants recover.
