= Puiggariella =

Scientific classification
- Kingdom: Fungi
- Division: Ascomycota
- Class: Dothideomycetes
- Order: Strigulales
- Family: Strigulaceae
- Genus: Puiggariella; Speg. (1881)

Type species
- Puiggariella apiahyna Speg. (1881)

Species
- P. confluens P. hypothelia P. nemathora P. nigrocincta

Synonyms
- Amoebomyces Bat. & H.Maia (1965)

Genus of lichens

Puiggariella is a genus of lichen-forming fungi in the family Strigulaceae. It comprises four species of tropical leaf-dwelling lichens.

== Taxonomy ==
The genus Puiggariella was first established by the Argentine mycologist Carlo Luigi Spegazzini in 1881. Over time, it was subsumed within Strigula due to shared morphological features, such as pale, non-carbonised perithecia (fruiting bodies) and folded thalli with small white papillae. Molecular phylogenetics studies, particularly those by Jiang and colleagues (2020), have justified the resurrection of Puiggariella as a distinct genus, recognising its unique evolutionary lineage within foliicolous (leaf-dwelling) fungi.

This genus is closely related to Strigula, but distinct in both morphology and ecological preferences. The light grey-green to whitish thalli of Puiggariella are subcuticular (partially embedded within the leaf surface), often with a rugose (wrinkled) or plicate (folded) texture and scattered white papillae. The genus associates with the photobiont Cephaleuros, a relationship that is consistent across its known species.

Puiggariella includes four morphologically defined species, with molecular data available for two. Its type species, Puiggariella apiahyna (synonymised with Puiggariella nemathora), has long been recognised for its distinctive appearance, particularly the pale perithecia that lack carbonaceous walls. This taxon is now understood as a collective species, comprising several lineages with slight morphological differences.

Recent taxonomic revisions have led to new combinations within the genus, such as Puiggariella hypothelia. The genus Puiggariella is now recognised as a distinct clade, differentiated from related genera not only by its morphological traits but also by its substrate and photobiont specificity.

== Description ==
The thallus of Puiggariella is light grey-green to whitish green and partially embedded in the leaf surface (subcuticular). It is either corticate or pseudocorticate (having a thin, incomplete outer layer) and often has a wrinkled and folded (rugose-plicate) texture, interspersed with numerous small, white, wart-like projections (papillae). This genus associates with the green alga of the genus Cephaleuros, which serves as its photosynthetic partner.

The sexual reproductive structures, called perithecia, are small, pale, wart-shaped structures that develop partially embedded in or protruding from the thallus. These structures are stiolate, meaning they have a small opening through which spores are released, and lack the blackened, carbonaceous walls typical of many other lichen perithecia. Surrounding the perithecia is a pale to brownish involucrellum, a protective outer covering, with an excipulum (the layer beneath) of a similar colour and net-like texture (prosoplectenchymatous).

Inside, the hamathecium comprises slender, flexible, unbranched, or occasionally branched filaments called paraphyses, which are colourless (hyaline) and measure 0.5–0.7 μm in width. The asci, or spore sacs, are narrow and club-shaped (obclavate), containing eight spores each. They are bitunicate, with two functional wall layers aiding in spore release, and fissitunicate, meaning they split open to discharge spores. The ascospores are hyaline, fusiform (spindle-shaped), and divided into two cells (1-septate). They are thin-walled, slightly constricted at the septum, and arranged in either a random or two-row pattern within the asci.

Asexual reproduction occurs through specialised structures called pycnidia, which are infrequent and appear as small, dark, immersed dots on the thallus. These structures produce two types of asexual spores (conidia): larger, rod-shaped macroconidia with one septum and gelatinous appendages, and smaller, ellipsoid to spindle-shaped (fusiform) microconidia that lack septa. Both types of conidia are hyaline. No secondary metabolites, such as lichen-specific compounds, have been identified in this genus.

== Habitat and distribution ==
Puiggariella species are found in tropical regions, ranging from lowland areas to montane zones. They grow as lichenised fungi on the surfaces of leaves in terrestrial environments.

== Species ==
- Puiggariella confluens (Müll.Arg.) S.H.Jiang, Lücking & J.C.Wei (2020)
- Puiggariella hypothelia (Nyl.) S.H.Jiang, Lücking & Sérus. (2020)
- Puiggariella nemathora (Mont.) S.H.Jiang, Lücking & J.C.Wei (2020)
- Puiggariella nigrocincta (Müll.Arg.) S.H.Jiang, Lücking & J.C.Wei (2020)
