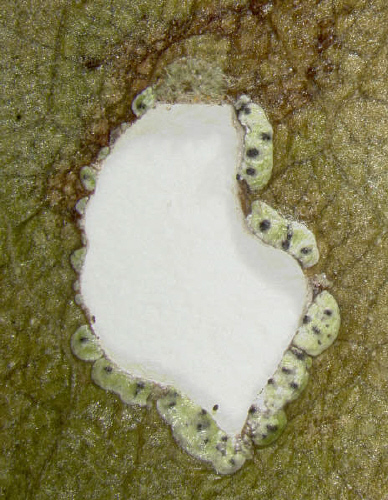
- Strigula species on plant foliage in Hawaii (possibly Strigula elegans)

Scientific classification
- Kingdom: Fungi
- Division: Ascomycota
- Class: Dothideomycetes
- Order: Strigulales
- Family: Strigulaceae; Zahlbr., 1898

Type genus
- Strigula Zahlbr. (1898)

Synonyms
- Phyllobatheliaceae Bitter & F.Schill. (1927)

= Strigulaceae =

Family of lichen-forming fungi

Strigulaceae is a family of mostly lichen-forming fungi, one of two families in the order Strigulales (class Dothideomycetes). A molecular analysis of the type genus, Strigula, has led to a reallocation of the foliicolous species into six genera that correspond to well-delimited clades with diagnostic phenotype features. These lichens live almost exclusively in tropical rainforests, where they grow as thin films on the surface of living leaves rather than on bark or rock like many other lichens. The family includes around 140 species distributed across multiple continents, making them one of the most widespread groups of leaf-dwelling organisms. DNA studies have revealed that what scientists once thought was a single large genus actually represents several distinct evolutionary lineages.

== Taxonomy ==
The family Strigulaceae was erected by Alexander Zahlbruckner in 1898 for a mixed assortment of leaf-inhabiting pyrenocarpous lichens. Mid-twentieth-century revisions restricted the concept to three epiphyllous genera—Strigula, Phylloporis and Raciborskiella—but subsequent authors merged the latter two into an expanded Strigula and went on to add corticolous (bark-dwelling) and saxicolous (rock-dwelling) species as well as the genera Phyllobathelium, Phyllocratera and Flavobathelium on morphological grounds. Although multigene surveys in the late 2000s showed that these satellite taxa belonged inside Strigulaceae, they also hinted that Strigula sensu lato (in the loose sense) was paraphyletic and that the delimitation of genera within the family required re-examination. Strigulaceae is placed in the order Strigulales (class Dothideomycetes) and forms the core lichenised lineage of that order; its closest relative is the recently described family Tenuitholiascaceae.

A broad multilocus phylogeny published in 2020 analysed 65 specimens representing 27 foliicolous species of Strigula sensu lato using various genetic markers. The study recovered six strongly supported clades that correlate with clear morphological and ecological characters, and it treated each clade at generic rank. The type species, S. smaragdula, anchors Strigula sensu stricto (in the strict sense); the novel Serusiauxiella groups species with rapidly elongating macroconidial appendages and a Trentepohlia-like photobiont; Raciborskiella comprises hypophyllous taxa with large ascospores; Puiggariella accommodates species with pale, non-carbonised perithecia and papillose thalli; Racoplaca covers the S. subtilissima complex characterised by olive-brown, finely lobed thalli edged by a black line; and Phylloporis was reinstated for supracuticular species allied to a Phycopeltis photobiont. Together these six genera constitute a monophyletic foliicolous lineage within Strigulaceae, and the authors transferred or recombined more than a dozen species names to reflect the revised framework.

The same analysis showed that the only sequenced non-foliicolous taxon, Strigula jamesii, does not belong to this core lineage but instead forms a separate clade together with Flavobathelium and Phyllobathelium . This finding implies that additional saxicolous and corticolous species presently kept in Strigula will require reassignment once their DNA data become available. As of 2020, therefore, Strigulaceae included at least the nine lichenised genera Strigula, Serusiauxiella, Raciborskiella, Puiggariella, Racoplaca, Phylloporis, Flavobathelium, Phyllobathelium and Phyllocratera, while the status of non-lichenised Oletheriostrigula remained doubtful pending further study.

== Description ==
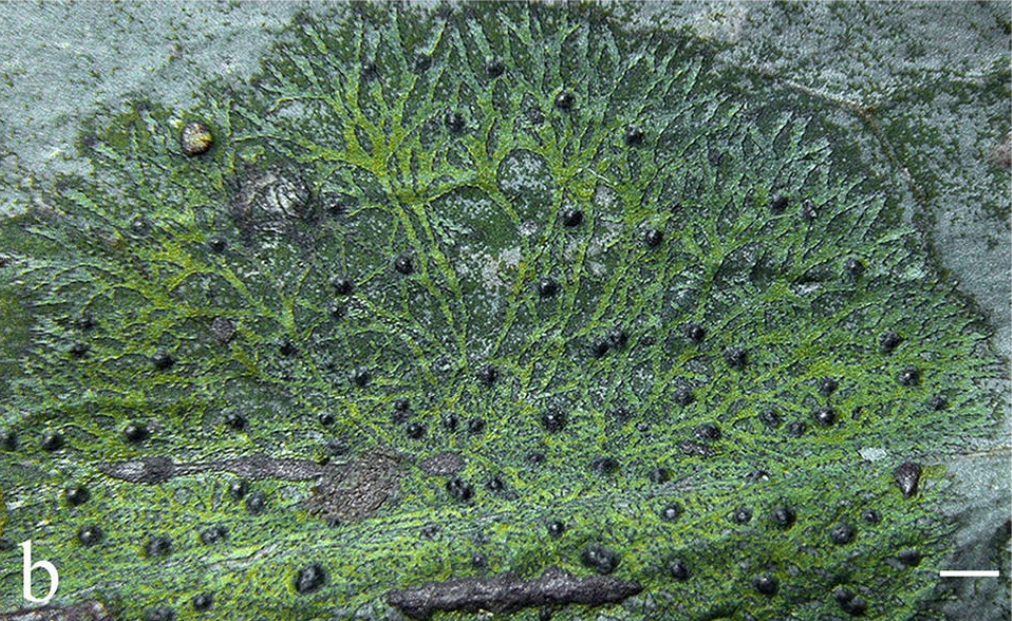
Racoplaca melanobapha

Members of Strigulaceae are tiny, leaf-inhabiting lichens that usually form thin, crust-like films rather than the leafy or shrubby growth seen in many temperate lichens. Most species live inside the outer cuticle of living leaves (a habit called subcuticular), so their thalli show up only as faint green to grey patches or delicate olive-brown lobes on the leaf surface; in a few genera the lichen sits on top of the cuticle (supracuticular) and can be peeled away with a needle. Four easily recognised thallus patterns match the main genetic lineages: thick bright-green crusts (Strigula sensu stricto and Serusiauxiella), paper-thin bluish films on the leaf underside (Raciborskiella), folded pale-green mats with tiny white pimples (Puiggariella), and olive-brown, lobe-edged patches outlined by a hair-line black border (Racoplaca). Because these lichens are so inconspicuous and confined to tropical forests, many casual observers overlook them entirely.

Microscopically the family is unified by a Strigula-type ascus—a tiny, double-walled (bitunicate) spore sac whose tip contains a short clear plug (the ocular chamber); this character separates Strigulaceae from its closest relative, Tenuitholiascaceae. Each ascus releases eight colourless ascospores, usually with a single cross-wall (septum) and measuring 7–70 micrometres (μm) depending on the genus; in Raciborskiella the spores are at the larger end of this range and bear gelatinous "tails" that probably aid in sticking to new leaves. The flask-shaped fruit bodies (perithecia) that house the asci are minute black dots, their walls commonly carbonised (hardened and darkened) except in Puiggariella. Asexual spores (macroconidia) are rod-shaped and tipped with mucilaginous appendages; in most genera these swell slowly after a day in water, but in Serusiauxiella they elongate to roughly 70 μm within an hour—a rapid-fire trick thought to help the spores glue themselves to the slippery leaf surface. Chemical screening shows no detectable lichen products, so chemical spot tests and thin-layer chromatography are uninformative for this family.

== Photobiont ==
Strigulaceae lichens partner with just a few groups of green algae. The majority harbour Cephaleuros, a filamentous alga that threads through the leaf cuticle and makes it difficult to lift the lichen away; Serusiauxiella instead teams up with a Trentepohlia-like alga, while the supracuticular genus Phylloporis associates with Phycopeltis, whose flat, radiating plates let the lichen detach cleanly.

== Genera ==
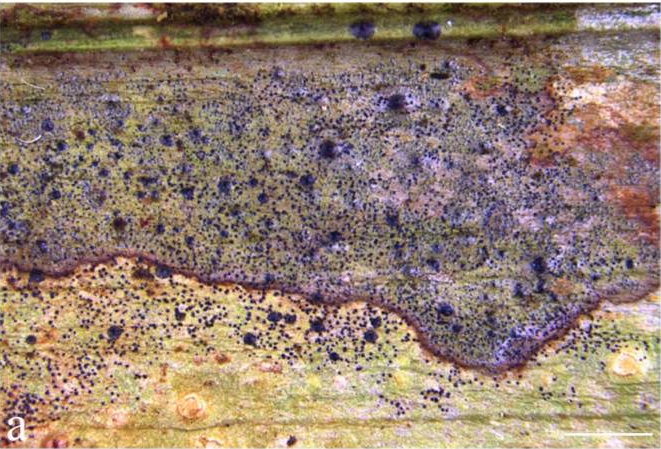
Phylloporis palmae

- Dichoporis Clem. (1909) – 20 spp.
- Flagellostrigula Lücking, S.H.Jiang & Sérus. (2020) – 2 spp.
- Flavobathelium Lücking, Aptroot & G.Thor (1997) – 1 sp.
- Oletheriostrigula Huhndorf & R.C.Harris (1996) – 1 sp.
- Phyllobathelium (Müll.Arg.) Müll.Arg. (1890) – 8 spp.
- Phyllocharis Fée – 1 sp.
- Phyllocraterina Sérus. & Aptroot (2020)
- Phylloporis Clem. (1909) – 6 spp.
- Puiggariella Speg. (1881) – 3 spp.
- Raciborskiella Höhn. (1909) – 2 spp.
- Racoplaca Fée (1825) – 5 spp.
- Serusiauxiella S.H.Jiang, Lücking & J.C.Wei (2020) – 3 spp.
- Strigula Fr. (1823) – ca. 60 spp.
- Swinscowia S.H.Jiang, Lücking & Sérus. (2020) – 34 spp.
