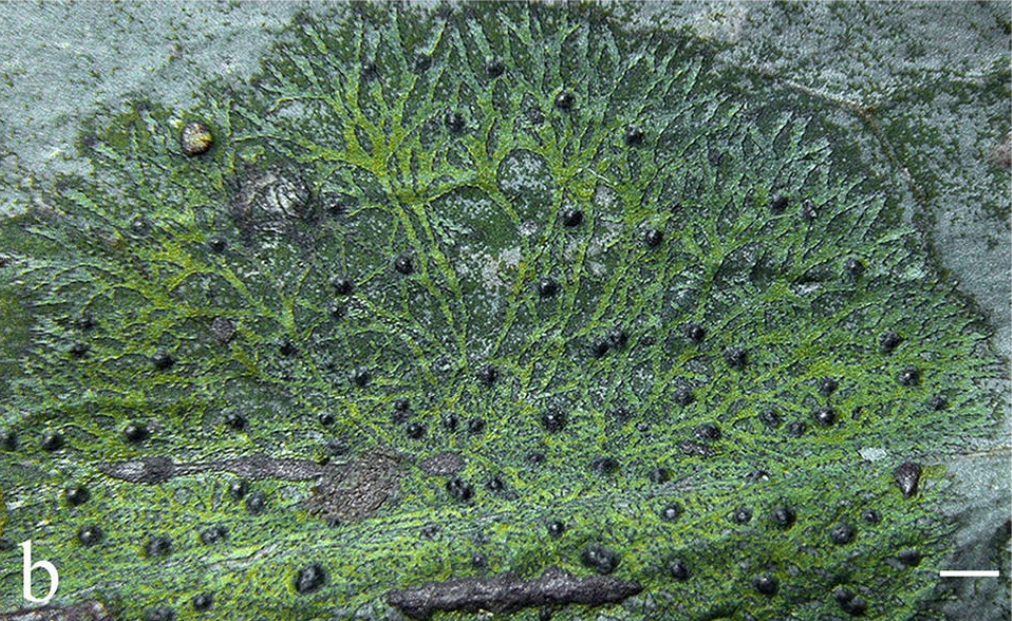
- Racoplaca melanobapha; scale bar = 600 micrometres

Scientific classification
- Kingdom: Fungi
- Division: Ascomycota
- Class: Dothideomycetes
- Order: Strigulales
- Family: Strigulaceae
- Genus: Racoplaca; Fée (1825)

Type species
- Racoplaca subtilissima Fée (1825)

Species
- R. macrospora R. maculata R. maculatoides R. melanobapha R. subtilissima R. transversoundulata R. tremens

= Racoplaca =

Genus of lichens

Racoplaca is a genus of lichen-forming fungi in the family Strigulaceae. It comprises seven species of foliicolous (leaf-dwelling) lichens.

== Taxonomy ==
The genus Racoplaca was originally established by Antoine Laurent Apollinaire Fée in 1824 but was later subsumed within the broader genus Strigula. A 2020 multilocus phylogenetic analysis by Shu-Hua Jiang and colleagues demonstrated that foliicolous (leaf-dwelling) species previously placed in Strigula actually represent six distinct evolutionary lineages. This led to the resurrection of Racoplaca specifically for members of the Strigula subtilissima group. The analysis showed Racoplaca forming a well-supported monophyletic clade characterised by thin, olive-brown to dark olive-green thalli with a metallic sheen, composed of dichotomously branched lobes bordered by thin black lines.

The genus can be distinguished from other related genera in the Strigulaceae by its characteristic thallus morphology, the presence of black borderlines along the lobes, and its carbonised perithecial walls that are covered by a thin thallus layer up to the ostiole.

== Description ==
Racoplaca is a genus of crustose lichens that grow on living leaves (foliicolous). The lichen forms a thin, distinctive crust beneath the leaf cuticle, characterised by repeated forking (dichotomous) branches that create a network-like pattern radiating outward. Each branch of this pattern is outlined by a thin black border. The photobiont (algal partner) in this symbiotic relationship is from the genus Cephaleuros.

The sexual reproductive structures (perithecia) are prominent and shaped like warts or cones. These are typically covered by a thin layer of the lichen's body (thallus) except at the opening (ostiole), giving them a partially black appearance. The internal fertile tissue (hamathecium) is colourless and does not react with iodine-based chemical tests. The spore-producing cells (asci) are club-shaped to oblong, with a short apex (tholus) and narrow chamber. Each ascus produces eight colourless, two-celled ascospores arranged in two rows or irregularly.

The asexual reproductive structures include small black, wart-like to conical chambers (pycnidia) that are either sunken or surface-level. These produce two types of colourless spores (conidia): larger rod-shaped to thread-like ones with two cells and short gel-like appendages at both ends (10–25 μm, never exceeding 50 μm), and smaller, single-celled, spindle to ellipsoid-shaped ones. Chemical analysis using thin-layer chromatography reveals no secondary metabolites.

== Species ==
As of January 2025, Species Fungorum (in the Catalogue of Life) accept seven species of Racoplaca:

- Racoplaca macrospora S.H.Jiang, J.C.Wei & Lücking (2021) – China
- Racoplaca maculata (Cooke & Massee) S.H.Jiang, Lücking & J.C.Wei (2020) – Brazil
- Racoplaca maculatoides S.H.Jiang, J.C.Wei & Lücking (2021) – China
- Racoplaca melanobapha (Kremp.) S.H.Jiang, Lücking & J.C.Wei (2020) – pantropical
- Racoplaca subtilissima Fée (1825)
- Racoplaca transversoundulata (Sipman) S.H.Jiang, Lücking & J.C.Wei (2020) – Guyana
- Racoplaca tremens (Müll.Arg.) S.H.Jiang, Lücking & J.C.Wei (2020) – Brazil
