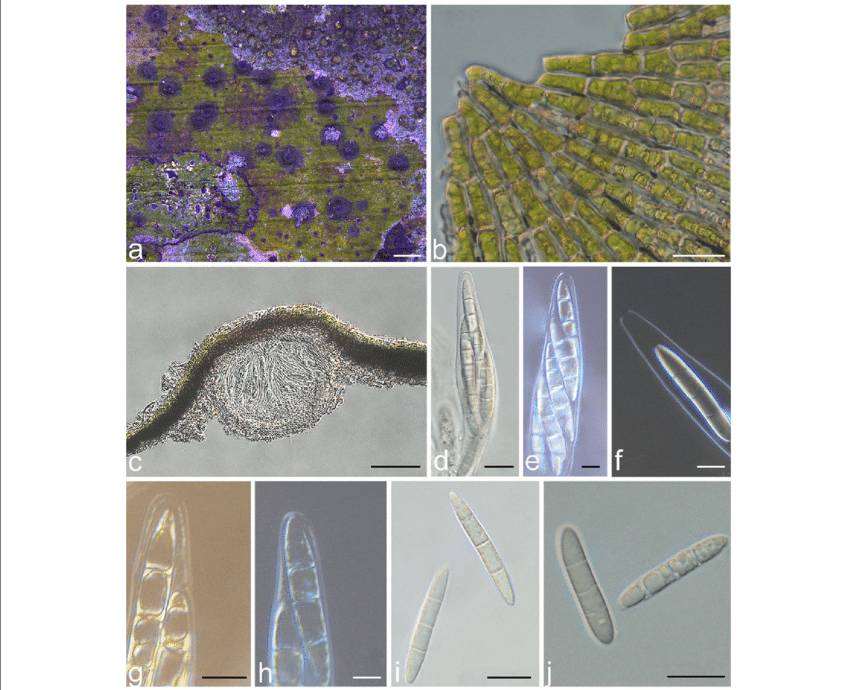
- Tenuitholiascus porinoides. (a) Thallus (b) The Phycopeltis algal partner (c) Perithecia in vertical section (d, e) Asci (f) Ascus apex (g, h) Ascus with iodine reaction (i, j) Ascospores. Scale bars: a=300 μm, b=10 μm, c=20 μm, d, i, j=10 μm, e–h=5 μm

Scientific classification
- Kingdom: Fungi
- Division: Ascomycota
- Class: Dothideomycetes
- Order: Strigulales
- Family: Tenuitholiascaceae; S.H.Jiang, Lücking & J.C.Wei (2020)
- Genus: Tenuitholiascus; S.H.Jiang, Lücking & J.C.Wei (2020)
- Species: T. porinoides

Binomial name
- Tenuitholiascus porinoides S.H.Jiang, Lücking & J.C.Wei (2020)

= Tenuitholiascus =

Species of lichen

Tenuitholiascus is a fungal genus in the monotypic family Tenuitholiascaceae, itself in the order Strigulales. The genus contains a single species, Tenuitholiascus porinoides, a foliicolous (leaf-dwelling) lichen found in China.

== Taxonomy ==
The genus, and family were circumscribed in 2020 by Shu-Hua Jiang, Robert Lücking and Jiang Chun Wei. The type specimen was collected by Jiang from the Hainan Bawangling National Nature Reserve (Hainan, China) at an altitude of 700 m (2,300 ft); there, in a wet tropical forest, it was growing on living leaves. It is only known to occur at the type locality. The genus name, which refers to its characteristic thin-walled asci, is derived from Latin roots: tenuis- ("slender"), tholus ("dome"), and ascus ("tube" or "bag"). The species epithet porinoides alludes to its resemblance to genus Porina.

Molecular phylogenetic analysis revealed that the fungus represented a previously unknown lineage in the Dothideomycetes, forming a clade with a sister group relationship to the Strigulaceae, a family mostly comprising foliicolous lichen-forming fungi.

== Description ==
The lichen, which lives on the cuticle of the leaf (and is readily removed from its surface), is smooth and pale green, measuring 3–12 mm in diameter and about 30–50 μm thick. The photobiont partner is from the trentepohlioid green algal genus Phycopeltis. Tenuitholiascus porinoides produces colourless,fusiform spores that have 3 septa and measure 25–30 by 6–8 μm. No lichen products were detected in collected specimens using thin-layer chromatography. The characteristic feature of the fungus is the thin walls of the apex of its ascus–an uncommon character in the Dothideomycetes.
