= Flagellostrigula =

Scientific classification
- Kingdom: Fungi
- Division: Ascomycota
- Class: Dothideomycetes
- Order: Strigulales
- Family: Strigulaceae
- Genus: Flagellostrigula; Lücking, S.H.Jiang & Sérus. (2020)

Type species
- Flagellostrigula laureriformis (Aptroot & Lücking) Lücking, S.H.Jiang & Sérus. (2020)

Species
- F. laureriformis F. pyrenuloides

Genus of lichens

Flagellostrigula is a small genus of lichen-forming fungi in the family Strigulaceae. It was established for a distinctive, bark-dwelling lineage known chiefly from its asexual stage. The type species is Flagellostrigula laureriformis, and a second species, F. pyrenuloides, was transferred to the genus in 2025. The genus is marked by unusually large asexual fruiting bodies (pycnidia) and by macroconidia that bear a single, long, whip-like gelatinous appendage at one end. Both species are found in tropical to subtropical regions of the Americas, growing on tree bark.

== Taxonomy ==
Flagellostrigula was proposed in 2020 by Robert Lücking, Shu-Hua Jiang, and Emmanuël Sérusiaux to accommodate a morphologically unusual species originally described as Strigula laureriformis; in establishing the genus, that species was transferred as Flagellostrigula laureriformis. Molecular data were not yet available, so the genus was originally delimited by morphology. It resembles Dichoporis in having macroconidia with a single septum, but differs in key details of the asexual structures.

In 2025, André Aptroot and Lücking made the new combination Flagellostrigula pyrenuloides (basionym Strigula pyrenuloides, 2020), based on material from Brazil (Pantanal, Mato Grosso do Sul), making the genus no longer monotypic. Reports from Costa Rica and Brazil match the concept of the type species, while a Chinese record with slightly different pycnidial morphology may represent an additional, as yet unnamed species within Flagellostrigula rather than F. laureriformis in the strict sense.

== Description ==
The thallus (lichen body) of Flagellostrigula is greenish and corticate (with a protective outer cortex), growing on bark. The photobiont partner is the green alga Trentepohlia. Sexual reproductive structures (ascomata) are unknown for the genus; all confirmed material is from the asexual state.

Pycnidia (asexual fruiting bodies) are common, conspicuous, and relatively large for the group, hemispherical to wart-like, and up to about 0.8 mm in diameter. They are covered by a noticeably thick layer of thallus tissue. Conidia are produced at the tip of the conidiogenous cell (acrogenous), and only macroconidia are known. These macroconidia are one-septate (two-celled), broadly rod-shaped, hyaline (colourless), and bear a single, very long, flagelliform (whip-like) gelatinous appendage at one end that measures roughly 15–35 × 1 micrometres and is typically three to four times the length of the conidium. No secondary metabolites (lichen products) have been detected in the thallus.

== Habitat and distribution ==
Flagellostrigula is corticolous (bark-dwelling) in terrestrial tropical to subtropical habitats. F. laureriformis is documented from the Neotropics, including Costa Rica and Brazil, and the Chinese material with deviating pycnidia may represent a separate species within the genus. F. pyrenuloides was described from the Brazilian Pantanal, consistent with a Neotropical distribution for the group as currently known.
