= Phyllobathelium =

Scientific classification
- Kingdom: Fungi
- Division: Ascomycota
- Class: Dothideomycetes
- Order: Strigulales
- Family: Strigulaceae
- Genus: Phyllobathelium (Müll.Arg.) Müll.Arg. (1890)

Synonyms
- Bathelium sect. Phyllobathelium Müll.Arg. (1883); Opercularia Stirt. (1878); Septoriomyces Cavalc. & A.A.Silva (1972)

Genus of lichens

Phyllobathelium is a genus of lichen-forming fungi in the family Strigulaceae. It comprises eight species of foliicolous (leaf-dwelling, crustose lichens.

== Taxonomy ==
The Swiss lichenologist Johannes Müller Argoviensis first proposed Phyllobathelium in 1883 as a section of the genus Bathelium. He promoted it to full genus status in 1890.

== Description ==
The main characteristic of the genus is the presence of black, amorphous to pulverulent (i.e., powdery and crumbly) structures on the upper part of the wall of the perithecium (fruiting bodies).

== Species ==
As of August 2024, Species Fungorum (in the Catalogue of Life) accept eight species of Phyllobathelium:

- Phyllobathelium anomalum Lücking (2008) – Ecuador
- Phyllobathelium chlorogastricum (Müll.Arg.) Aptroot & Lücking (2016) – South America
- Phyllobathelium epiphyllum (Müll.Arg.) Müll.Arg. (1890)
- Phyllobathelium firmum (Stirt.) Vězda (2000)
- Phyllobathelium leguminosae (Cavalc. & A.A.Silva) Lücking & Sérus. (1998)
- Phyllobathelium megapotamicum (Malme) R.Sant. (1952)
- Phyllobathelium nigrum R.Sant. & Tibell (1988) – Australia; Fiji; Java
- Phyllobathelium thaxteri (Vain.) Zahlbr. (1931)

Two species once placed in this genus have since been transferred to Swinscowia:

- Phyllobathelium albolinitum (Nyl.) H.Mayrhofer (1987) = Swinscowia albolinita
- Phyllobathelium obtectum (Vain.) H.Mayrhofer (1987) = Swinscowia obtecta

Phyllobathelium nudum Zahlbr. (1928) was transferred to the genus Phyllocraterina in 2013, and is now known as Phyllocraterina nuda.
