= Juwangsan =

Mountain in South Korea

Coordinates: 36°23′21.192″N 127°9′45.32″E

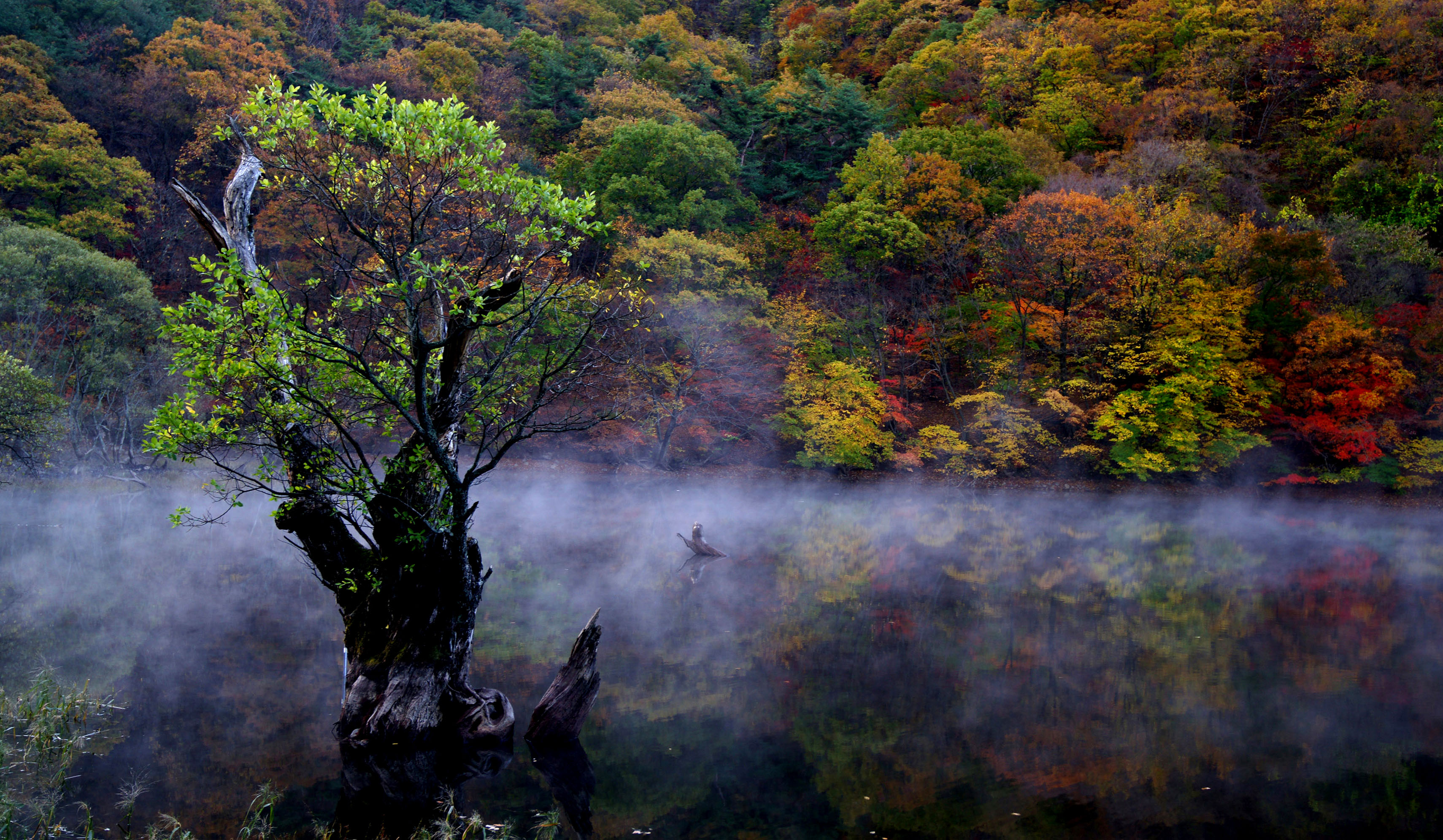

Highest point
- Elevation: 721 m (2,365 ft)

Geography
- Location: North Gyeongsang Province, South Korea

Juwangsan is a mountain of North Gyeongsang Province, eastern South Korea. It has an elevation of 721 metres.

== See also ==
- Juwangsan National Park
- List of mountains of Korea
