= Phyllocraterina =

Scientific classification
- Kingdom: Fungi
- Division: Ascomycota
- Class: Dothideomycetes
- Order: Strigulales
- Family: Strigulaceae
- Genus: Phyllocraterina; Sérus. & Aptroot (2020)

Species
- P. nuda P. papuana

Synonyms
- Phyllocratera Sérus. & Aptroot (1997)

Genus of lichens

Phyllocraterina is a small genus of lichen-forming fungi in the family Strigulaceae. It comprises two species of leaf-dwelling (foliicolous) lichens.

== Taxonomy ==
The genus was first proposed as Phyllocratera by the lichenologists Emmanuël Sérusiaux and André Aptroot in 1997. This name, however, was later deemed illegitimate under Article 53.1 of the International Code of Nomenclature for algae, fungi, and plants, due to prior use in botany. A similar name, Phyllocrater Wernham, had been established in 1914 for a genus in the family Rubiaceae. The Nomenclature Committee for Fungi determined that the similarity between Phyllocratera and Phyllocrater constituted a case of parahomonymy, leading to its invalidation. As a result, Sérusiaux and Aptroot established Phyllocraterina as a replacement name, publishing it alongside the type species Phyllocraterina papuana. While the genus currently includes two species, molecular data are not yet available for either.

== Description ==
Phyllocraterina species are tropical lichens that grow on the surfaces of leaves in lowland to montane regions. Their thalli (lichen bodies) are thin, grey-green, and slightly crust-like, forming a close bond with their green algae partner, Phycopeltis. The reproductive structures (the perithecia) are black and wart-like, with a broad base and a small pore at the top for spore release. These structures have tough, carbon-rich walls and a protective outer layer.

Inside the perithecia, there are slender, unbranched filaments (paraphyses) that are clear and measure about 1.5–2 micrometres wide. The spore-producing cells (asci) contain eight spores each. These asci are structured in a way that allows them to split open for spore release. The spores themselves are transparent, have multiple internal walls, and are shaped like elongated ellipses with a slight pinch at the middle. So far, no form of asexual reproduction has been observed, and no chemical compounds (lichen products) unique to these lichens have been detected.

== Species ==
- Phyllocratera nuda (Zahlbr.) Lücking & Sérus. (2013)
- Phyllocratera papuana Sérus. & Aptroot (1997)
