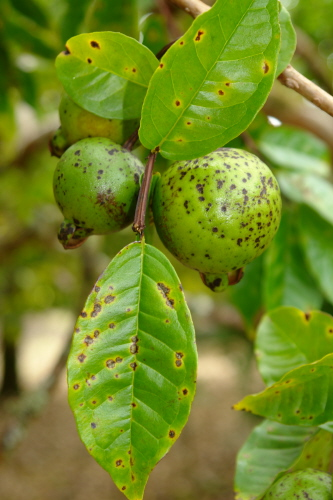
- Cephaleuros virescens as a parasite of guava leaves and fruit in Hawaii, causing a leaf and fruit spot disease

Scientific classification
- Clade: Viridiplantae
- Division: Chlorophyta
- Class: Ulvophyceae
- Order: Trentepohliales
- Family: Trentepohliaceae
- Genus: Cephaleuros
- Species: C. virescens

Binomial name
- Cephaleuros virescens Kunze ex E.M.Fries 1832: 327

Synonyms
- Cephaleuros parasiticus

= Cephaleuros virescens =

Species of alga

Cephaleuros virescens is an algal plant pathogen that infects tea, coffee and coconut plants, causing algal leaf spot or algal rust. It infects a wide vary of tree species, and is widely distributed in the tropics and subtropics.

== Biology ==
Cephaleuros virescens consists of circular thalli with a crenate margin, consisting of two main dichotomously branching filaments. Sporangiophores (asexually reproductive structures) emerge laterally from the thallus branches, and are solitary or in tufts of 3–5. Gametangia (sexually reproductive structures) are produced above the thallus, and characteristically the gametangial cell wall divides to form a group of 2–6 or more gametangia.

=== Host and symptoms ===
Cephaleuros virescens is known to have a broad host range, the widest host range of the genus. It has been recorded on 287 plant species and cultivars on the U.S. Gulf coast alone. Common hosts of the plant include tropical trees and shrubs, with the following being the more common or economically important; tea, kava, pepper, para rubber, magnolia, coffee, holly, Indian hawthorn, oil palm, avocado, vanilla, mango, breadfruit, guava, coconut, cashews, cacao, citrus, etc.

Most commonly Cephaleuros virescens is identified by the leaf spots it causes. Theses leaf spots are an orange-brown rust in color and usually occur entirely on the upper leaf surface, although leaf spots on the undersides of infected leaves have been reported. The spots are fuzzy in texture and approximately 2 cm (0.8 in) in diameter. In some cases, commonly in more susceptible hosts, stem and fruit spots can occur as a result of infection as well. These leaf spots cause a reduction in plant photosynthetic surface area. While usually harmless, severe causes of these leaf spots can lead to defoliation, twig dieback, tissue necrosis, and loss of marketable fruit.

=== Life cycle ===
Although both a sexual and an asexual form of reproduction occur, the asexual stage is considered to be important due to it being the more common mode 9k of inoculum in the pathogen's disease cycle. Infection occurs when either the sporangia or thallus filaments are deposited on the tissues of a susceptible plant host. The pathogen is usually dispersed through water or wind. Under the right environmental conditions, zoospores are released from the sporangia, and symptoms will begin to develop. The zoospores are able to penetrate the host cuticle in a haustorial manner. A flat, circular thallus develops subcuticularly. Algal filaments extend from these thalli further increasing the surface area this pathogen infects. The pathogen survives on existing leaf and stems as spores, and in fallen plant debris. As the pathogen lives in tropical climates it is able to survive year-round rather than relying on survival structures.

== Environment ==
As this plant pathogen is an algal species, it thrives under similar conditions as other algal organisms. Cephaleuros virescens prefers moist, humid weather. Areas with frequent rain, and warm to high temperatures are where this pathogen flourishes. It has been recorded in all continents with tropical and sub-tropical environments. It is commonly seen in Hawaii and Florida, but there has also been recorded incidents of the disease in India and Thailand.

== Management ==
Often, leaf spot caused by Cephaleuros virescens is not damaging enough to the host plant's vigor or crop yield and therefore generally does not warrant management. If however the crop is highly susceptible, a form of integrated pest management can be used to prevent the spread and infection of the disease. This includes sanitation and pruning of infected plant parts. Since lower branches are usually infected, make sure to remove them as well as any debris that has littered the ground below the infected plant. Reducing humidity or increasing air flow can also help, as the pathogen is most successful in moist, humid environments. Keep the plant or crop in a sunny, aerated, well-drained area. Selecting for a tolerant variety of plant, and if needed, intercropping, can reduce the rate of infection. If needed copper fungicides may assist but would need to be applied every two weeks if the environment remains wet.

== Importance ==
Although the plant pathogen is commonly mild enough to not cause serious effects to crop vigor and yield, in susceptible plants it can cause significant damage. Most commonly, economically detrimental infections occur in guava. Guava is considered to be a susceptible host, and the leaf spot symptoms can grow to be severe enough to reduce plant vigor and cause defoliation. In guava, Cephaleuros virescens can cause fruit spots as well, leading to a reduction in crop yield.
