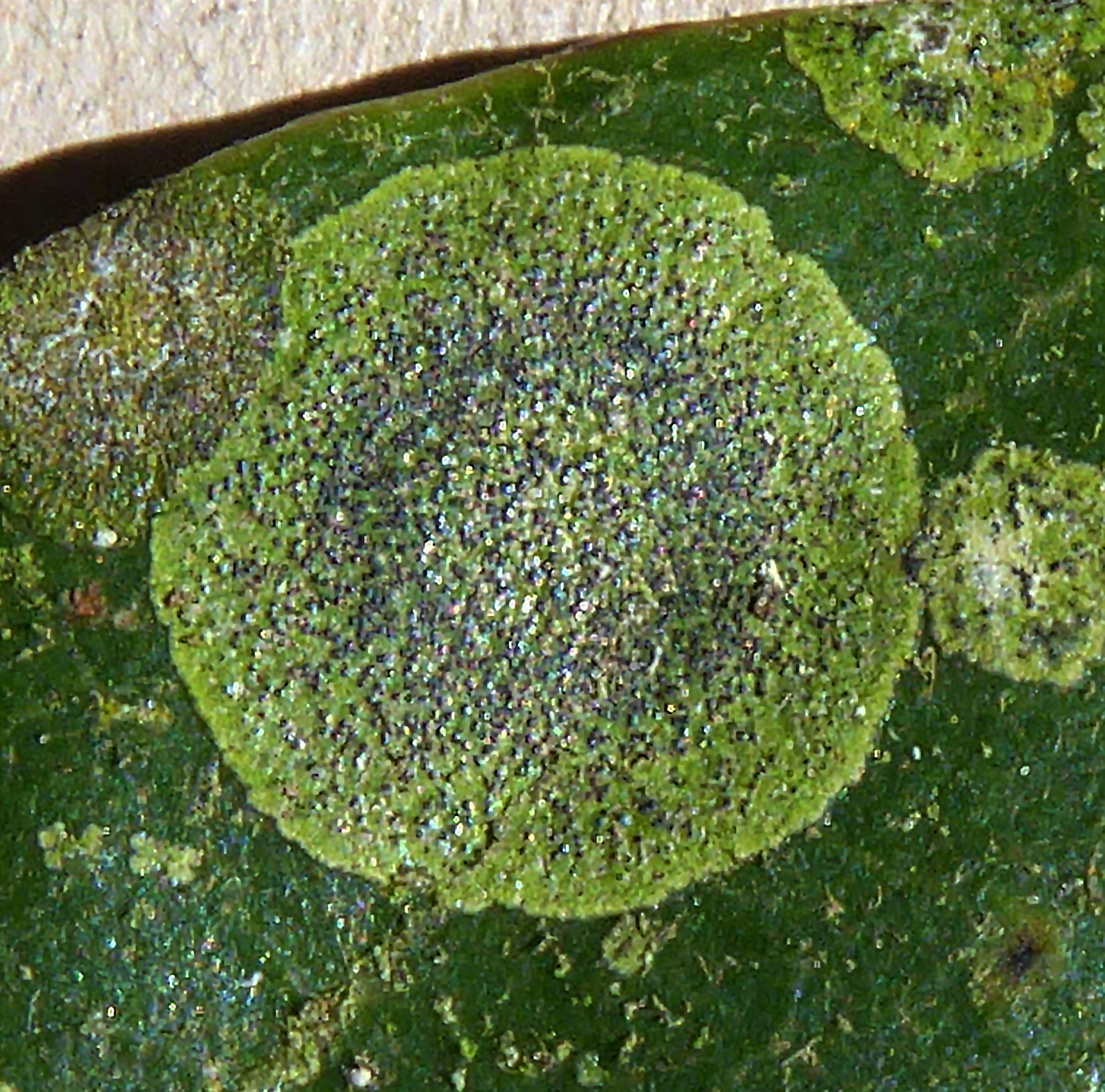
- Strigula oleistrata

Scientific classification
- Kingdom: Fungi
- Division: Ascomycota
- Class: Dothideomycetes
- Order: Strigulales; Lücking, M.P.Nelsen & K.D.Hyde (2013)

Families
- Strigulaceae; Tenuitholiascaceae

Synonyms
- Phyllobatheliaceae Bitter & F.Schill. (1927)

= Strigulales =

Order of lichen-forming fungi

The Strigulales are an order of lichen-forming fungi in the class Dothideomycetes. It contains two families: Strigulaceae and Tenuitholiascaceae, with a combined total of 115 species. The order was proposed in 2013. Most species in the order are foliicolous, that is, they grow on plant leaves.

== Taxonomy ==
Strigulales was introduced as a new order by Robert Lücking, Matthew Nelsen and Kevin Hyde in a 2013 revision of Dothideomycetes classification. The order is distinguished from most Trypetheliales by several microscopic features: its spores have true walls at each division (euseptate ascospores) with only a few cross-walls, and secondary metabolites (lichen products) are nearly absent from the lichen tissues. It also differs from both Monoblastiales and Trypetheliales in the structure of its sterile filaments (paraphyses), which are mostly unbranched, and in its large asexual spores (macroconidia), which form gel-like appendages at their ends. The order is typified by the genus Strigula Fr.

In 2020, Shu-Hua Jiang, Robert Lücking and Jiang-Chun Wei introduced a new monotypic family, Tenuitholiascaceae, to accommodate Tenuitholiascus porinoides, a foliicolous (leaf-dwelling) lichen from Hainan, and placed it within Strigulales. Their molecular analyses recovered Tenuitholiascus as a distinct lineage in the Dothideomycetes forming a sister relationship to Strigulaceae, supporting recognition at family rank within the order; subsequent outlines have retained this placement. The genus is diagnosed by its unusually thin-walled ascus apex and colourless, three-septate spores, features that, together with the phylogeny, justified establishing a separate family in Strigulales.

== Description ==
Strigulales species are predominantly crustose thalli that most often grow epiphytically—on living leaves, tree bark, or rock. On leaves the thallus sits just below or just above the cuticle; on bark it may occupy the outer skin (periderm) or sit on top of it; and it ranges from lacking a distinct outer layer (ecorticate) to having a thin cortex. The symbiotic partner (phtobiont) is a trentepohlioid alga (filamentous green algae that often look orange). Sexual fruiting bodies are perithecioid—small, flask-shaped structures—with a dark outer sheath (involucrellum, sometimes reduced) and a supporting wall of psoroplectenchyma (a compact, brick-like tissue). The asci are fissitunicate (their wall splits when spores are released) and bear a small "ocular chamber" at the tip; the accompanying paraphyses are mostly unbranched (occasionally branched or weakly interconnected but never forming a net). Ascospores are colourless (hyaline), typically spindle-shaped to oblong, with one true cross-wall (1-septate); in some species they have more septa (3–7) or a muriform pattern (both cross- and longitudinal walls). Asexual spores (conidia) are produced in pycnidia; the larger conidia are often septate to muriform and end in gelatinous, thread-like appendages. Secondary metabolites are generally absent in the order.

== Families and genera ==
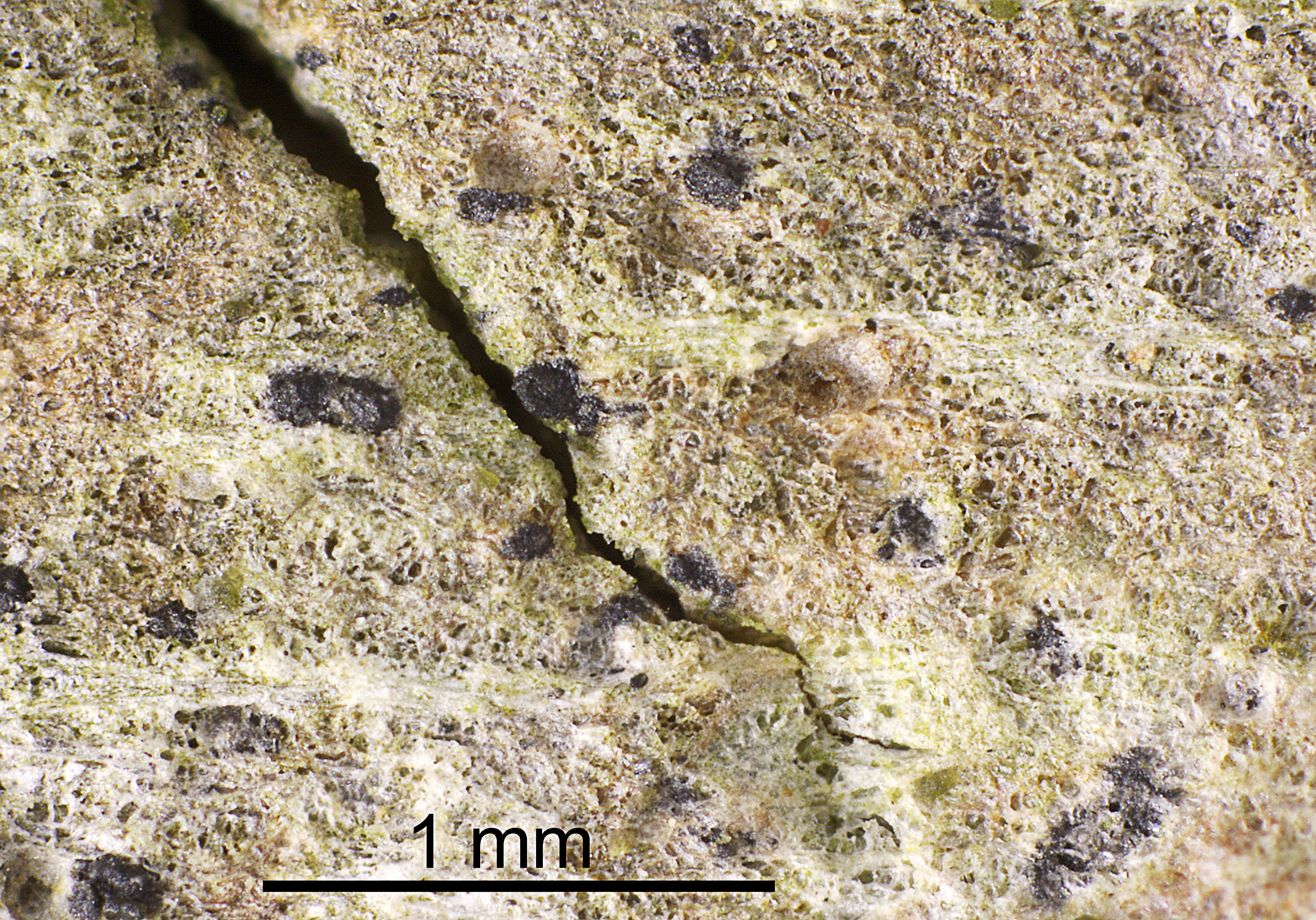
Swinscowia jamesii

According to a 2024 review of fungal classification, Strigulales contains 15 genera and about 140 species across two families.

- Strigulaceae Zahlbr. (1898)

- Dichoporis – 20 spp.
- Flagellostrigula – 1 sp.
- Flavobathelium – 1 sp.
- Oletheriostrigula – 1 sp.
- Phyllobathelium – 8 spp.
- Phyllocharis – 1 sp.
- Phyllocraterina – 2 spp.
- Phylloporis – 7 spp.
- Puiggariella – 5 spp.
- Raciborskiella – 1 spp.
- Racoplaca – 7 spp.
- Serusiauxiella – 3 spp.
- Strigula – ca. 50 spp.
- Swinscowia – 34 spp.

- Tenuitholiascaceae S.H.Jiang, Lücking & J.C.Wei (2020)

- Tenuitholiascus – 1 sp.
