= Flavobathelium =

Scientific classification
- Kingdom: Fungi
- Division: Ascomycota
- Class: Dothideomycetes
- Order: Strigulales
- Family: Strigulaceae
- Genus: Flavobathelium; Lücking, Aptroot & G.Thor (1997)

Type species
- Flavobathelium epiphyllum Lücking, Aptroot & G.Thor (1997)

Genus of fungi

Flavobathelium is a genus of fungi in the family Strigulaceae. A monotypic genus, it contains the single species Flavobathelium epiphyllum.

== See also ==
- List of Dothideomycetes genera incertae sedis
