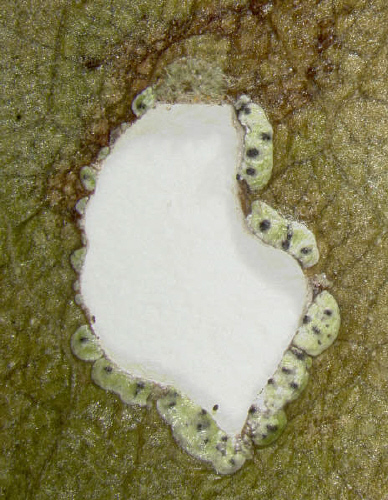
- Strigula species on plant foliage in Hawaii (possibly Strigula smaragdula)

Scientific classification
- Kingdom: Fungi
- Division: Ascomycota
- Class: Dothideomycetes
- Order: Strigulales
- Family: Strigulaceae
- Genus: Strigula; Fr. (1823)

Type species
- Strigula smaragdula Fr. (1830)

Synonyms
- List: Amoebomyces Bat. & H.Maia (1965); Craspedon Fée (1825); Didymaster Bat. & H.Maia (1967); Diporina Clem. (1909); Discosiella Syd. & P.Syd. (1912); Geisleriomyces Cif. & Tomas. (1953); Haploblastia Trevis. (1860); Heterodothis Syd. & P.Syd. (1914); Kilikiostroma Bat. & J.L.Bezerra (1961); Manaustrum Cavalc. & A.A.Silva (1972); Melanophthalmum Fée (1825); Nematora Fée (1825); Phyllocharis Fée (1825); Porinomyces Bat. (1967); Pycnociliospora Bat. (1962); Raciborskiella Höhn. (1909); Sagediomyces Cif. & Tomas. (1953); Shanoria Subram. & K.Ramakr. (1956); Strigulomyces Cif. & Tomas. (1953)

= Strigula =

Genus of lichens

Strigula is a genus of lichen-forming fungi in the family Strigulaceae.

== Taxonomy ==
The genus was circumscribed in 1823 by the English mycologist Elias Magnus Fries.

The taxonomy of the genus has undergone significant revisions based on multilocus phylogenetic analyses. Originally defined broadly to include species growing on various substrates, research revealed that foliicolous (leaf-dwelling) species formerly placed in Strigula actually form six well-defined clades that warranted recognition as separate genera. The foliicolous species have been reallocated into the following genera:

- Strigula (sensu stricto) – Includes the type species S. smaragdula and is characterized by thickened, bright green to grey-green thalli with a Cephaleuros photobiont (algal partner), carbonized perithecial walls, small to medium-sized ascospores, and macroconidia with short to medium-sized appendages.
- Serusiauxiella – A newly recognized genus with species that have a Trentepohlia photobiont and unique macroconidial appendages that rapidly grow to substantial lengths when observed in microscopic mounts.
- Raciborskiella – Includes hypophyllous (growing on leaf undersides) species with very thin, bluish grey thalli, carbonized perithecial walls, large ascospores (30–70 μm), and terminal appendages on ascospores.
- Puiggariella – Features species with distinctive thallus morphology displaying white papillae and non-carbonized (pale) perithecial walls.
- Racoplaca – Comprises species with thin, finely lobed thalli of olive-brown to dark olive-green color which feature a characteristic thin black line along the lobe margins.
- Phylloporis – Contains supracuticular species (growing on leaf surfaces) with a Phycopeltis photobiont, carbonized perithecial walls, and comparatively short asci and small ascospores.

== Description ==
Strigula, in its currently defined narrower sense, is a genus of lichen-forming fungi characterized by its distinctive foliicolous (leaf-dwelling) growth pattern. These lichens form subcuticular thalli, meaning they grow beneath the cuticle of leaves, infiltrating between cell layers rather than simply growing on the surface. The thalli (lichen bodies) of Strigula are typically thickened, with a characteristic bright green to grey-green coloration. They form rounded patches with entire to crenulate margins on leaf surfaces. Strigula species develop a symbiotic relationship with a specific algal partner (photobiont) in the genus Cephaleuros, which provides the lichen with carbohydrates through photosynthesis.

Reproductive structures include perithecia (flask-shaped fruiting bodies) that are partially immersed in the thallus, appearing as small, basally immersed and apically erumpent black dots. The perithecial wall is carbonized, appearing jet-black in cross-section. The perithecia contain asci (spore-producing cells) that are bitunicate (double-walled) with a short tholus and narrow ocular chamber.

Each ascus produces eight ascospores, which are arranged in one to two rows within the ascus. The ascospores are fusiform (spindle-shaped), single-septate (divided by one wall), colorless, and relatively small to medium-sized (7–25 × 4–6 μm). Strigula also produces asexual reproductive structures called pycnidia, which contain macroconidia (larger asexual spores) with short to medium-sized gelatinous appendages that extend only slowly when observed in laboratory preparations.

== Species ==
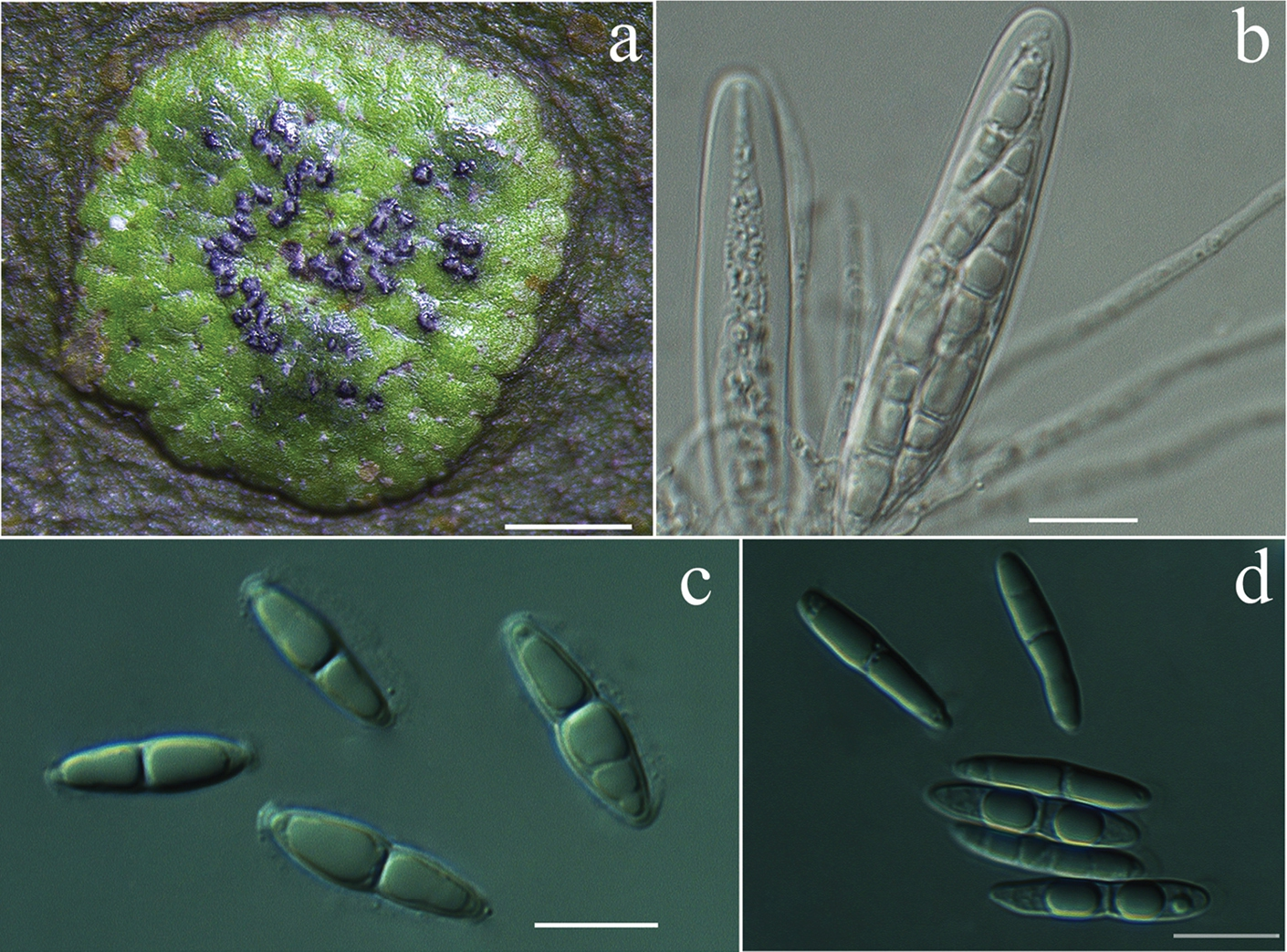
Holotype of Strigula acuticonidiarum. a. Thallus with perithecia and pycnidia. b. Asci, with eight biseriate ascospores. c. Ascospores, with constriction at septum. d. Macroconidia. Scale bars: a = 300 μm; b, d = 10 μm.

- Strigula acuticonidiarum S.H.Jiang, X.L.Wei & J.C.Wei (2017) – China
- Strigula antillarum (Fée) Müll.Arg. (1885)
- Strigula bella G.Thor, Lücking & Tat.Matsumoto (2000)
- Strigula caerulensis P.M.McCarthy (2009) – Australia
- Strigula concreta (Fée) R.Sant. (1952)
- Strigula cylindrospora (Syd. & P.Syd.) W.J.Li & K.D.Hyde (2020)
- Strigula depressa J.J.Woo, Lücking & Hur (2020) – Korea
- Strigula fossulicola P.M.McCarthy, Streimann & Elix (1996)
- Strigula fossulicoloides Sérus. (2004)
- Strigula guangdongensis S.H.Jiang, J.C.Wei & Lücking (2021) – China
- Strigula guangxiensis S.H.Jiang, X.L.Wei & J.C.Wei (2017) – China
- Strigula indutula (Nyl.) R.C.Harris (1995)
- Strigula intermedia S.H.Jiang, J.C.Wei & Lücking (2021) – China
- Strigula janeirensis (Müll.Arg.) Lücking (1998)
- Strigula lacericola P.M.McCarthy (2009)
- Strigula laevis S.H.Jiang, J.C.Wei & Lücking (2021) – China
- Strigula lobulosa Kunze ex Fr. (1830)
- Strigula macrocarpa Vain. (1923)
- Strigula microcarpa S.H.Jiang, J.C.Wei & Lücking (2021) – China
- Strigula minor (Vězda) Cl.Roux & Sérus. (2000)
- Strigula minuta Lücking (2008)
- Strigula multipunctata (G.Merr. ex R.Sant.) R.C.Harris (1995)
- Strigula nigrocarpa Lücking (2008)
- Strigula nitidula Mont. (1845)
- Strigula novae-zelandiae (Nag Raj) Sérus. (1998)
- Strigula obducta (Müll.Arg.) R.C.Harris (1995)
- Strigula oceanica P.M.McCarthy, Streimann & Elix (1996)
- Strigula oleistrata M.Ford, D.J.Blanchon & de Lange (2019)
- Strigula perparvula Diederich & Common (2019)
- Strigula platypoda (Müll.Arg.) R.C.Harris (1995)
- Strigula prasina Müll.Arg. (1885)
- Strigula pseudoantillarum S.H.Jiang, J.C.Wei & Lücking (2021) – China
- Strigula pseudosubtilissima S.H.Jiang, J.C.Wei & Lücking (2021) – China
- Strigula pycnoradians S.H.Jiang, J.C.Wei & Lücking (2021) – Thailand
- Strigula pyrenuloides Aptroot (2020) – Brazil
- Strigula schizospora R.Sant. (1952)
- Strigula sinoaustralis S.H.Jiang, X.L.Wei & J.C.Wei (2016)
- Strigula sinoconcreta S.H.Jiang, J.C.Wei & Lücking (2021) – China
- Strigula smaragdula Fr. (1830)
- Strigula stenoloba S.H.Jiang, J.C.Wei & Lücking (2021) – China
- Strigula subelegans Vain. (1923)
- Strigula submuriformis (R.C.Harris) R.C.Harris (1987)
- Strigula subtilissimoides S.H.Jiang, J.C.Wei & Lücking (2021) – China
- Strigula univelbiserialis S.H.Jiang, X.L.Wei & J.C.Wei (2017)
- Strigula wandae M.Cáceres & Lücking (2003)
