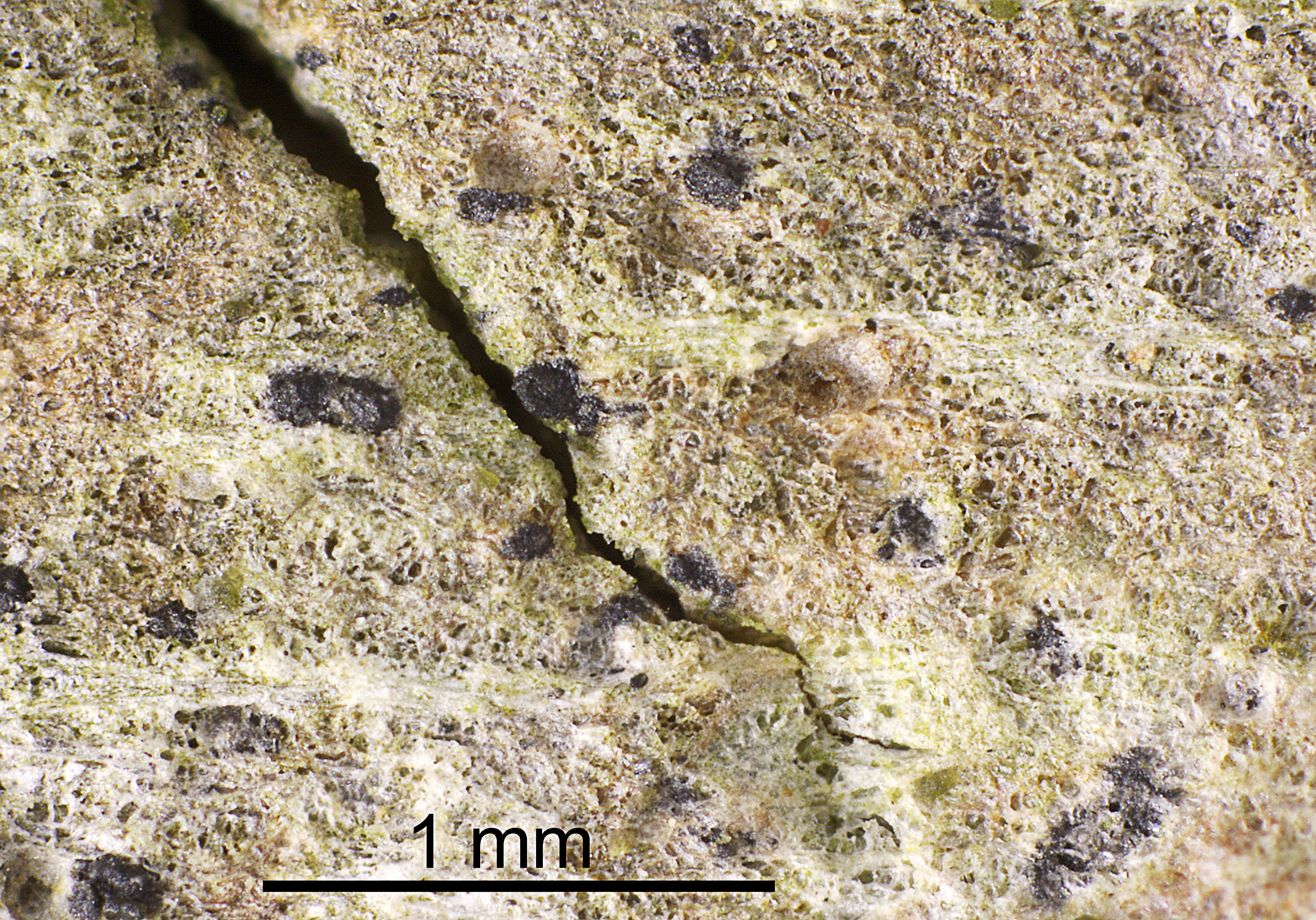
- Swinscowia jamesii

Scientific classification
- Kingdom: Fungi
- Division: Ascomycota
- Class: Dothideomycetes
- Order: Strigulales
- Family: Strigulaceae
- Genus: Swinscowia; S.H.Jiang, Lücking & Sérus. (2020)

Type species
- Swinscowia jamesii (Swinscow) S.H.Jiang, Lücking & Sérus. (2020)

Species
- see text

= Swinscowia =

Genus of lichen-forming fungi

Swinscowia is a genus of lichen-forming fungi in the family Strigulaceae. It has 34 species. Swinscowia was proposed in 2020 by the lichenologists Shu-Hua Jiang, Robert Lücking, and Emmanuël Sérusiaux to contain non-foliicolous species that were isolated from bark and rocks. Swinscowia jamesii, a species that was originally described in genus Geisleria, and later transferred to Strigula, is the type species of the genus. The genus name honours British lichenologist Dougal Swinscow, who originally described the type species in 1967.

== Description ==
Swinscowia is a genus of lichens that grows on bark and rocks, occurring in environments ranging from temperate mountain regions to tropical areas. The lichen forms a crust-like growth (thallus) that typically lacks a protective outer layer (cortex) and appears whitish to brownish in colour. The photosynthetic partner (photobiont) belongs to the green algal genus Trentepohlia.

The fungal reproductive structures (ascomata) appear as small, flask-shaped chambers called perithecia. These are usually black, though occasionally pale, and may be either sunken into or protruding from the lichen surface. They are typically scattered across the thallus but often occur in dense groups. The perithecia are generally hardened and carbonised, with a protective outer layer (involucrellum) and an inner spore-producing layer (excipulum) that ranges from pale to blackish-brown.

Inside the perithecia, spores develop within elongated sacs (asci), typically eight per sac. These spores (ascospores) are translucent and divided into segments by cross-walls, usually having 3–7 compartments, though some may develop a more complex, grid-like (muriform) internal structure. The spores are often constricted at these dividing walls and may break apart at these points. The genus also produces smaller reproductive structures called pycnidia, which appear as tiny black dots on the surface. These generate two types of asexual spores (conidia): larger ones with multiple segments and smaller, single-celled ones. Both types are translucent, with the larger conidia often bearing jelly-like appendages. Unlike many other lichen genera, Swinscowia does not produce any known secondary metabolites.

== Species ==
As of May 2025, Species Fungorum (in the Catalogue of Life) accept 34 species of Swinscowia:

- Swinscowia affinis (A.Massal.) S.H.Jiang, Lücking & Sérus. (2020)
- Swinscowia albicascens (Nyl.) S.H.Jiang, Lücking & Sérus. (2020)
- Swinscowia albolinita (Nyl.) S.H.Jiang, Lücking & Sérus. (2020)
- Swinscowia alpestris (Vězda) S.H.Jiang, Lücking & Sérus. (2020)
- Swinscowia amphora (Aptroot & Lücking) S.H.Jiang, Lücking & Sérus. (2020)
- Swinscowia aquatica (H.Harada) S.H.Jiang, Lücking & Sérus. (2020)
- Swinscowia australiensis (P.M.McCarthy) S.H.Jiang, Lücking & Sérus. (2020)
- Swinscowia bahamensis (Riddle) S.H.Jiang, Lücking & Sérus. (2020)
- Swinscowia bispora (Aptroot & K.H.Moon) S.H.Jiang, Lücking & Sérus. (2020)
- Swinscowia calcarea (Bricaud & Cl.Roux) S.H.Jiang, Lücking & Sérus. (2020)
- Swinscowia cavicola (Cl.Roux & Bricaud) S.H.Jiang, Lücking & Sérus. (2020)
- Swinscowia confusa (Fryday, Coppins & Common) S.H.Jiang, Lücking & Sérus. (2020)
- Swinscowia decipiens (Malme) S.H.Jiang, Lücking & Sérus. (2020)
- Swinscowia divisa (P.M.McCarthy) S.H.Jiang, Lücking & Sérus. (2020)
- Swinscowia endolithea (Cl.Roux & Bricaud) S.H.Jiang, Lücking & Sérus. (2020)
- Swinscowia fracticonidia (R.C.Harris) S.H.Jiang, Lücking & Sérus. (2020)
- Swinscowia glabra (A.Massal.) S.H.Jiang, Lücking & Sérus. (2020)
- Swinscowia griseonitens (R.C. Harris) S.H.Jiang, Lücking & Sérus. (2020)
- Swinscowia jamesii (Swinscow) S.H.Jiang, Lücking & Sérus. (2020)
- Swinscowia johnsonii (P.M.McCarthy) S.H.Jiang, Lücking & Sérus. (2020)
- Swinscowia laceribracae (R.C.Harris) S.H.Jiang, Lücking & Sérus. (2020)
- Swinscowia muriconidiata (Aptroot, L.I.Ferraro & M.Cáceres) S.H.Jiang, Lücking & Sérus. (2020)
- Swinscowia muriformis (Aptroot & Diederich) S.H.Jiang, Lücking & Sérus. (2020)
- Swinscowia muscicola (F.Berger, Coppins, Cl.Roux & Sérus.) S.H.Jiang, Lücking & Sérus. (2020)
- Swinscowia obtecta (Vain.) S.H.Jiang, Lücking & Sérus. (2020)
- Swinscowia pallida (Aptroot & K.H.Moon) S.H.Jiang, Lücking & Sérus. (2020)
- Swinscowia porinoides (Canals, Boqueras & Gómez-Bolea) S.H.Jiang, Lücking & Sérus. (2020)
- Swinscowia rhodinula (Zahlbr.) S.H.Jiang, Lücking & Sérus. (2020)
- Swinscowia rostrata (R.C.Harris & Aptroot) S.H.Jiang, Lücking & Sérus. (2020)
- Swinscowia rupestris (P.M.McCarthy) S.H.Jiang, Lücking & Sérus. (2020)
- Swinscowia stigmatella (Ach.) S.H.Jiang, Lücking & Sérus. (2020)
- Swinscowia submuriformis (R.C.Harris) S.H.Jiang, Lücking & Sérus. (2020)
- Swinscowia tagananae (Harm.) S.H.Jiang, Lücking & Sérus. (2020)
- Swinscowia thelopsidoides (Coppins, Cl.Roux & Sérus.) S.H.Jiang, Lücking & Sérus. (2020)
