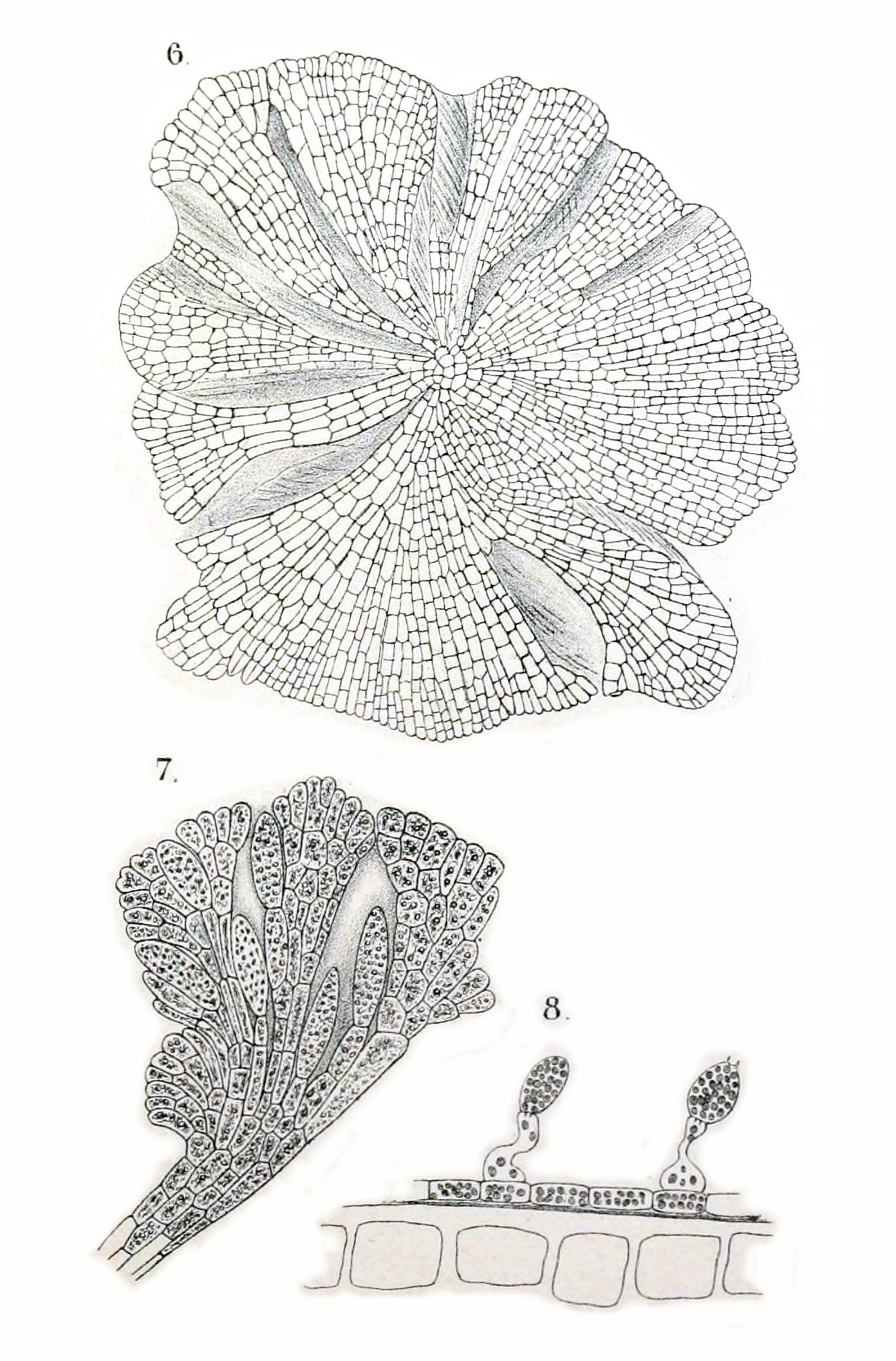
- Phycopeltis aurea

Scientific classification
- Kingdom: Plantae
- Division: Chlorophyta
- Class: Ulvophyceae
- Order: Trentepohliales
- Family: Trentepohliaceae
- Genus: Phycopeltis; Millardet

Type species
- Phycopeltis epiphyton Millardet

Species
- P. sp. 'M Guiry'

Synonyms
- Hansgirgia G.B.De Toni, 1888

= Phycopeltis =

Genus of algae

Phycopeltis is a genus of green algae in the family Trentepohliaceae. It is widespread in humid, tropical or subtropical regions. It typically occurs as an epiphyte on the surface of leaves, but may sometimes be found on rock, metal, or plastic surfaces. It can also be a phycobiont in lichens.

== Description ==
Phycopeltis consists of a single layer of coalescing, prostrate filaments that irregularly or regularly branch to form a small rounded or irregular disk. Some species have erect filaments growing out from the thallus, and/or "glandular" papillate cells. The thalli grow up to 7 mm in diameter. In shade, the thalli are green; with exposure to light or less humid conditions, they become pale yellow, orange or reddish brown due to the accumulation of carotenoid pigments and oil.

Asexual reproduction occurs by quadriflagellate zoospores, which are produced in sporangia that arise on curved, one- to many-celled stalks. Sexual reproduction is isogamous, and involves biflagellate gametes which are produced in lateral or intercalary gametangia.

The life cycle of Phycopeltis is incompletely known. Like its relative Trentepohlia, it is thought to have an isomorphic alternation of generations.

=== Identification ===
Phycopeltis differs from the related genus Cephaleuros in that the thalli are always monostromatic (one cell thick) and live on the surface of the leaves. Cephaleuros, on the other hand, has thalli that are within the leaves.
