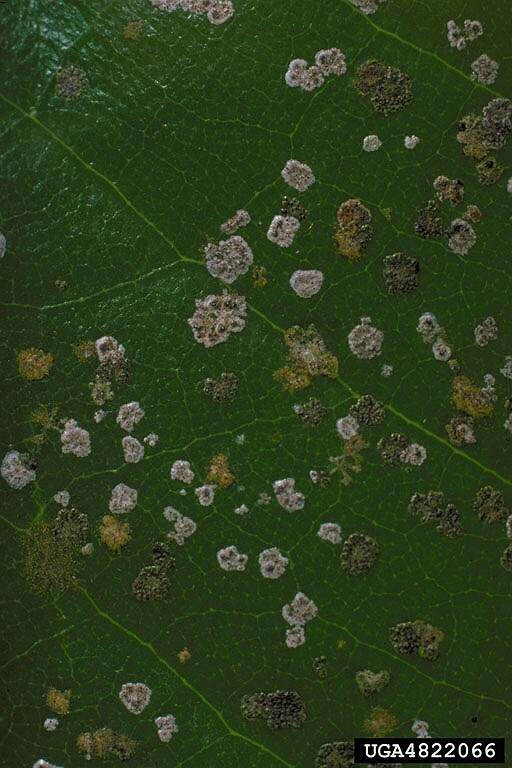
- Infestation of Cephaleuros virescens

Scientific classification
- Domain: Eukaryota
- Clade: Archaeplastida
- Clade: Viridiplantae
- Division: Chlorophyta
- Class: Ulvophyceae
- Order: Trentepohliales
- Family: Trentepohliaceae
- Genus: Cephaleuros; Kunze, 1827 ex Fries, 1832: 327

Type species
- Cephaleuros virescens Kunze ex E.M.Fries

= Cephaleuros =

Genus of algae

Cephaleuros is a genus of thalloid green algae comprising approximately 14 species. Its common name is red rust. Cephaleuros species are parasitic algae which grow within vascular plants, typically within the subtropics or tropics.

== Description ==
Cephaleuros forms velvet-like spots up to 10mm or more in diameter; these consist of a filamentous or pseudoparenchymatous, prostrate thallus and an erect system of filaments which branch from the prostrate thallus. The organism grows below the cuticle or epidermis of the host plant. Filaments branch dichotomously or pinnately, forming roughly circular thalli. Cells contain a single nucleus and an irregularly reticulate, parietal chloroplast with no pyrenoids. The cytoplasm often contains accumulations of carotenoid pigments, giving the thallus an orange-red color.

== Identification ==
Cephaleuros is often confused with non-algal taxa, since the fuzzy reddish spots are reminiscent of rust disease.

For species identification, the most important morphological characteristics are the thallus growth habit (filamentous or pseudoparenchymatous, location within the host plant cell), morphology of reproductive structures, and the kind of lesions produced (which are distinctive for a few species). Chromosome counts may also be useful.

=== Reproduction ===
Cephaleuros reproduces both asexually and sexually. Asexual reproduction occurs via the formation of zoospores, which are formed on zoosporangia on fertile branches. The fertile branches consist of an enlarged "head cell", and multiple "sporangiate laterals" which themselves consist of a short suffultory cell and a round, enlarged zoosporangium. Zoosporangia produce 8 to 64 zoospores. The zoospores have four equal flagella, and are released when the zoosporangia become wet.

Sexual reproduction is isogamous, with gametangia developing from lateral and terminal thallus cells. Eight to 64 gametes are produced within a gametangium; the gametes are biflagellate and somewhat smaller than their zoospore counterparts. They fuse outside of the gametangia if sufficient moisture is present, otherwise they fuse within the gametangia. The resulting zygotes reportedly developed into dwarf sporophytes which then produces spores through meiosis. However, this heteromorphic alternation of generations is not fully documented and may differ between species.

== Fossil record ==
Cephaleuros has been recorded from the fossil record once, as Pelicothallos villosus (originally thought to be a fungus, and now recognized to be a form of Cephaleuros). This fossil was found within the cuticle of Myrtaceae leaves in a Middle Eocene deposit in the Claiborne Formation, Tennessee.

== Parasitism ==
Cephaleuros is a parasite on angiosperms, and to a lesser extent gymnosperms. It is parasitic on some important economic plants of the tropics and subtropics such as tea, coffee, mango and guava causing damage limited to the area of algal growth on leaves (algal leaf spot), or killing new shoots, or disfiguring fruit. Spores germinate on plants in the rainy season. It is unclear how Cephaleuros enters its host plants.

Members of the genera may also grow with a fungus to form a lichen that does not damage the plants. In some cases (such as with Strigula smaragdula), it appears that the fungi surround the algae instead of the plants and extract water and nutrients from the algae; therefore, the fungi could be described as a hyperparasite.

Most species of Cephaleuros grow between the cuticle and epidermis of infected plants. A few species grow intercellularly, and these intercellular species cause more damage to host plants.

== Species ==
The species currently recognised are:

- Cephaleuros biolophus
- Cephaleuros diffusus
- Cephaleuros drouetii
- Cephaleuros endophyticus
- Cephaleuros expansa
- Cephaleuros henningsii
- Cephaleuros karstenii
- Cephaleuros lagerheimii
- Cephaleuros minimus
- Cephaleuros parasiticus
- Cephaleuros pilosa
- Cephaleuros solutus
- Cephaleuros tumidae-setae
- Cephaleuros virescens
