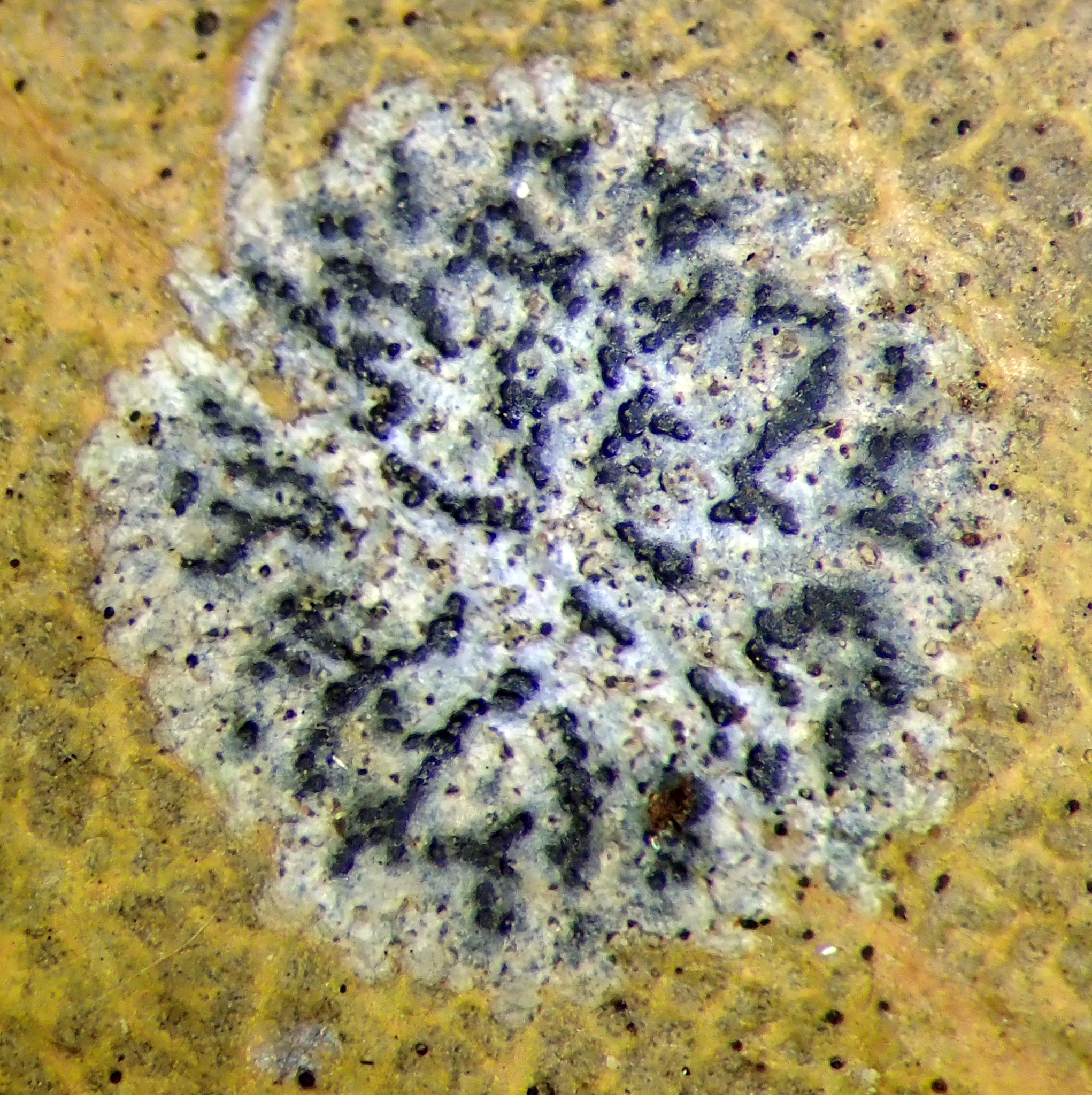
- Strigula novae-zelandiae on a Beilschmiedia tarairi leaf

Conservation status
- Naturally Uncommon (NZ TCS)

Scientific classification
- Kingdom: Fungi
- Division: Ascomycota
- Class: Dothideomycetes
- Order: Strigulales
- Family: Strigulaceae
- Genus: Strigula
- Species: S. novae-zelandiae

Binomial name
- Strigula novae-zelandiae (Nag Raj) Sérus., 1998

Synonyms
- Discosiella novae-zelandiae Nag Raj

= Strigula novae-zelandiae =

Species of lichen

Strigula novae-zelandiae is a species of foliicolous lichenised fungi in the family Strigulaceae. It is endemic to New Zealand, found northwards from the northern Waikato Region, and primarily grows on taraire leaves.

== Description ==
Strigula novae-zelandiae is typically pale green to ash green in colour, turning to white when dead. It has a smooth or slightly irregular surface and does not have a prothallus. It can be distinguished from other Strigula species in New Zealand due to the presence of polarilocular spores, and from Strigula oleistrata due to the lack of almost circular thalli or perithecia in Strigula novae-zelandiae.

== Taxonomy ==
The lichen was formally described as a new species by Tumkur R. Nag Raj in 1982, who used the name Discosiella novae-zelandiae. The holotype was collected from Kirk's Bush in Papakura, Auckland in 1973. The species was recombined by Emmanuël Sérusiaux in 1998, and moved to the genus Strigula. In 2019, the visually similar species Strigula oleistrata was segregated from Strigula novae-zelandiae and described as a new species, based on phylogenetic analysis and morphological differences. The species epithet refers to New Zealand.

== Distribution and habitat ==
The species is endemic to New Zealand, currently only known to occur in New Zealand as far south as the northern Waikato Region. It is found primarily in taraire-dominated forests, and is foliicolous, growing on the leaves of taraire, tawa and titoki trees.

== Gallery ==
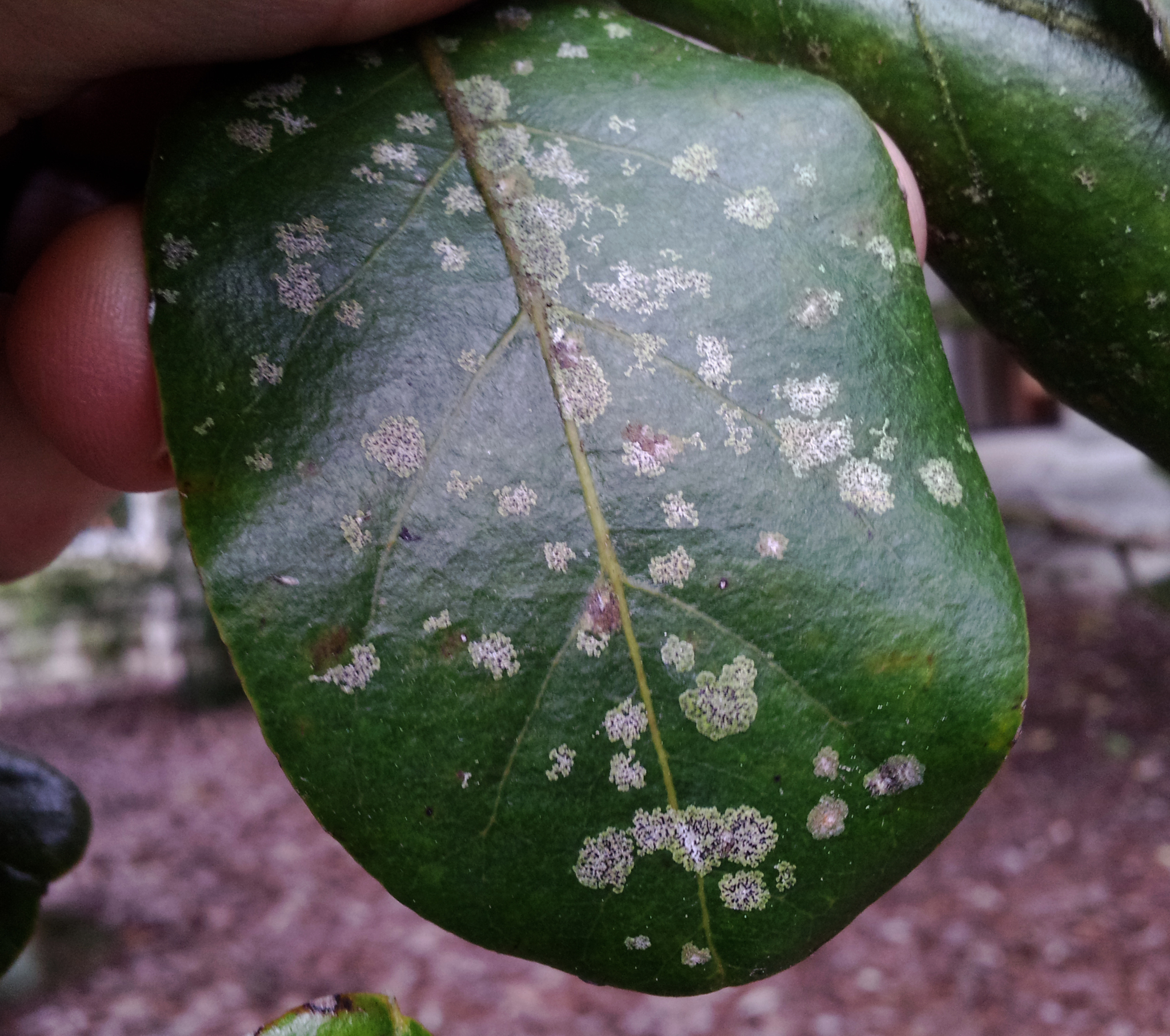

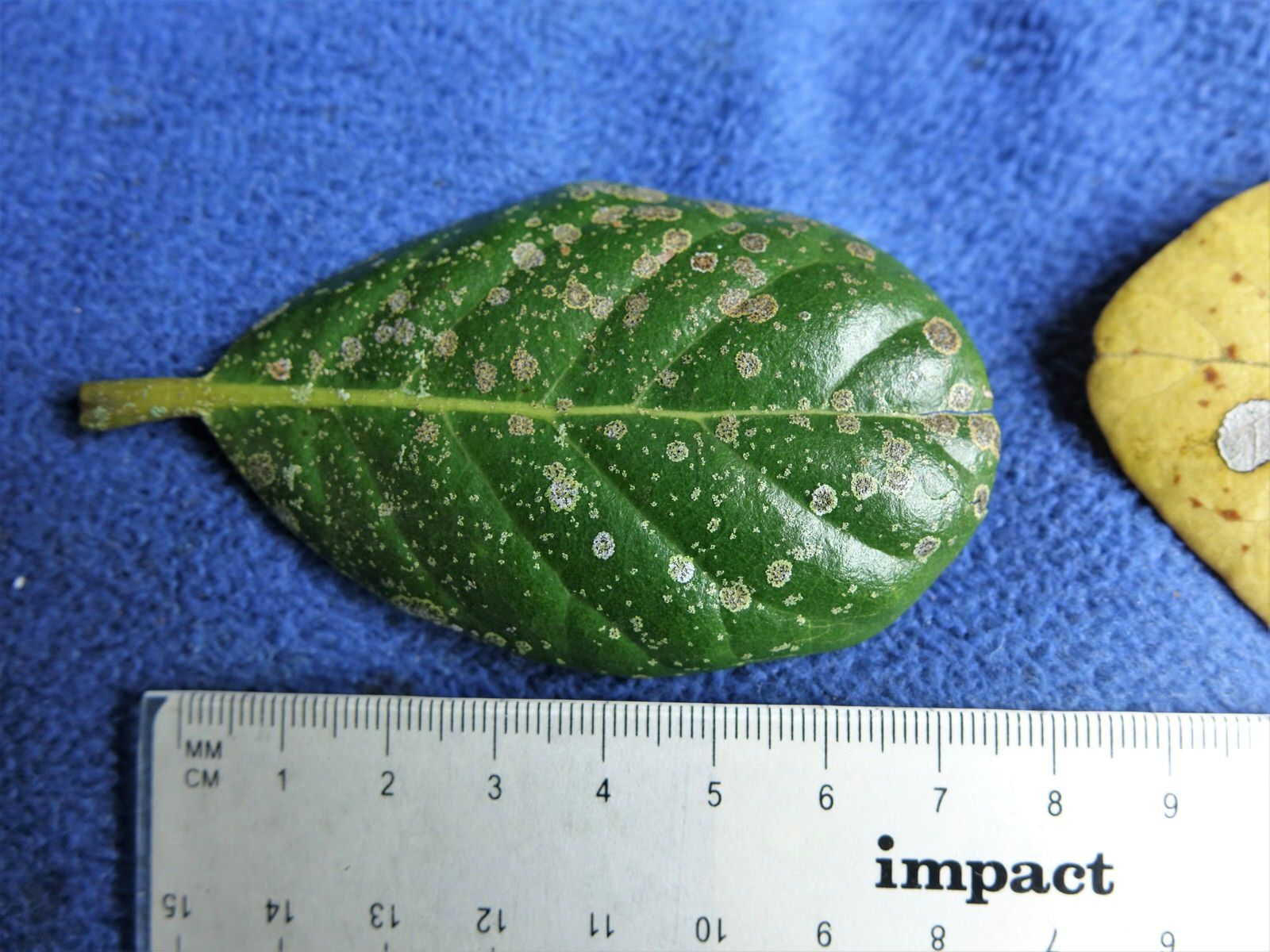

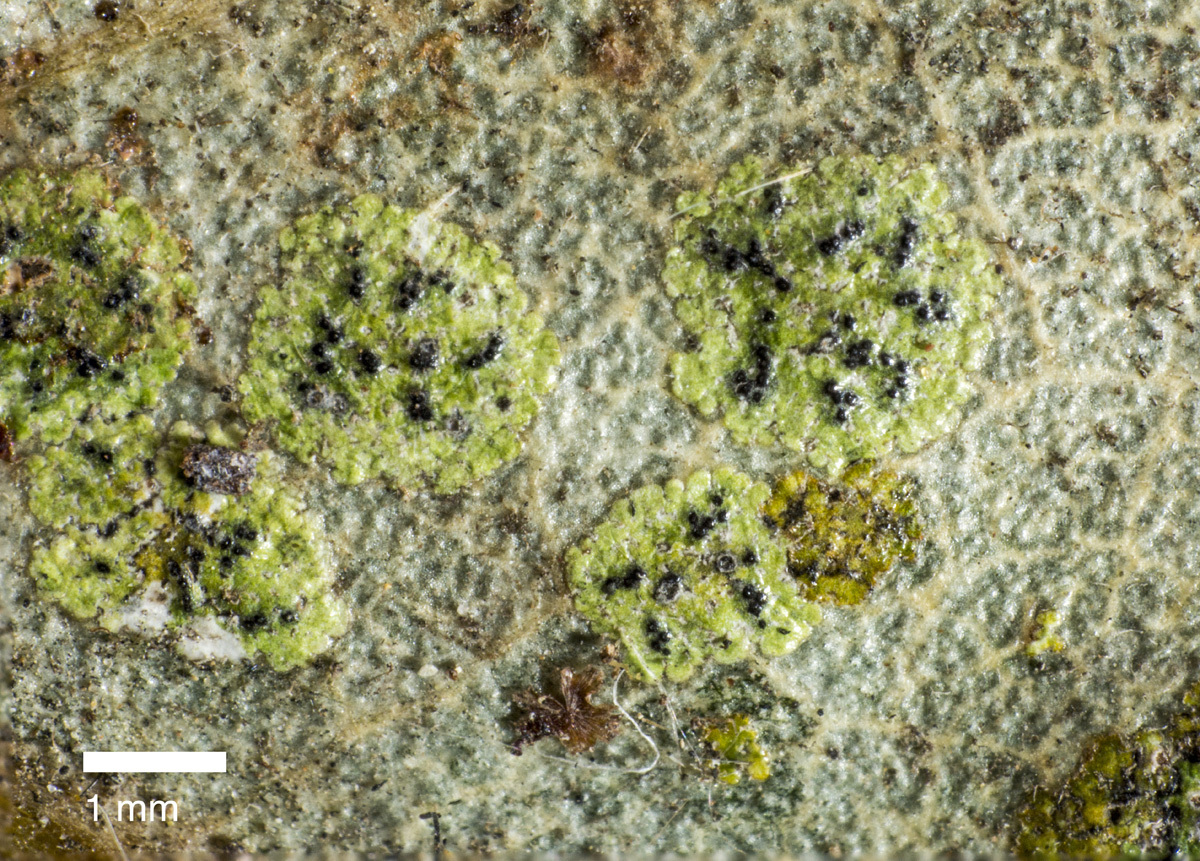
