= Kirk's Bush =

Forest in Auckland Region, New Zealand

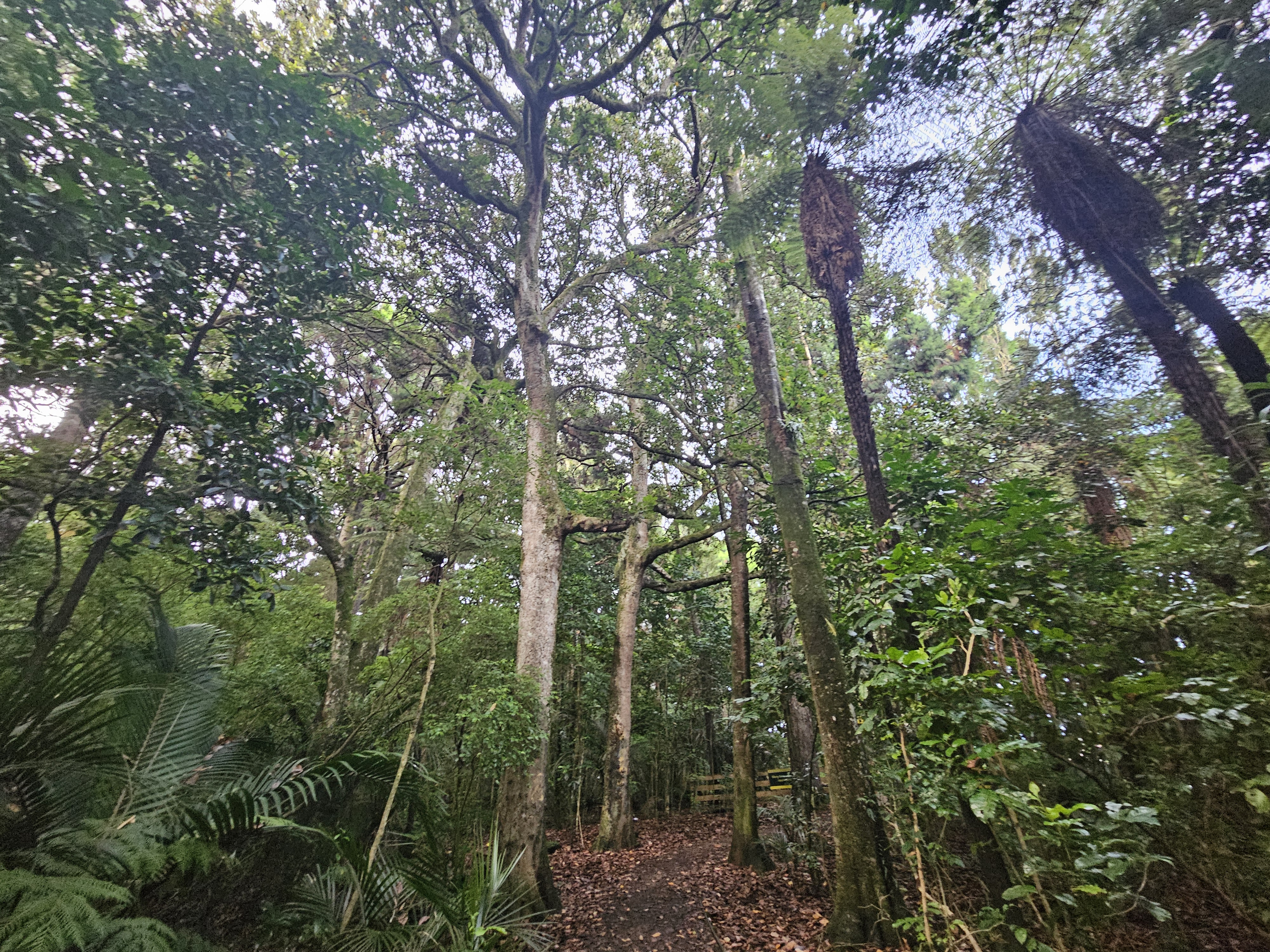
- Interactive map of Kirk's Bush
- Type: Public park
- Location: Papakura, Auckland, New Zealand
- Coordinates: 37°04′26″S 174°56′30″E
- Area: 6.9 hectares (17 acres)
- Created: 1921
- Operator: Auckland Council
- Status: Open year round

Kirk's Bush is a protected area of remnant native forest on Great South Road in Papakura, South Auckland, New Zealand. Dominated by mature taraire trees, the forest includes the largest known taraire tree in the world. Kirk's Bush was established as a scenic reserve in 1921, after community opposition to the forest's possible subdivision and sale.

== Geography ==
Kirk's Bush is located in Papakura, at the intersection of Great South Road and Beach Road. It is a remnant of the extensive forest that covered the Papakura area prior to European settlement. The park is primarily bush, connected by networks of paths and boardwalks, and adjoins Southern Park.

== Biodiversity ==
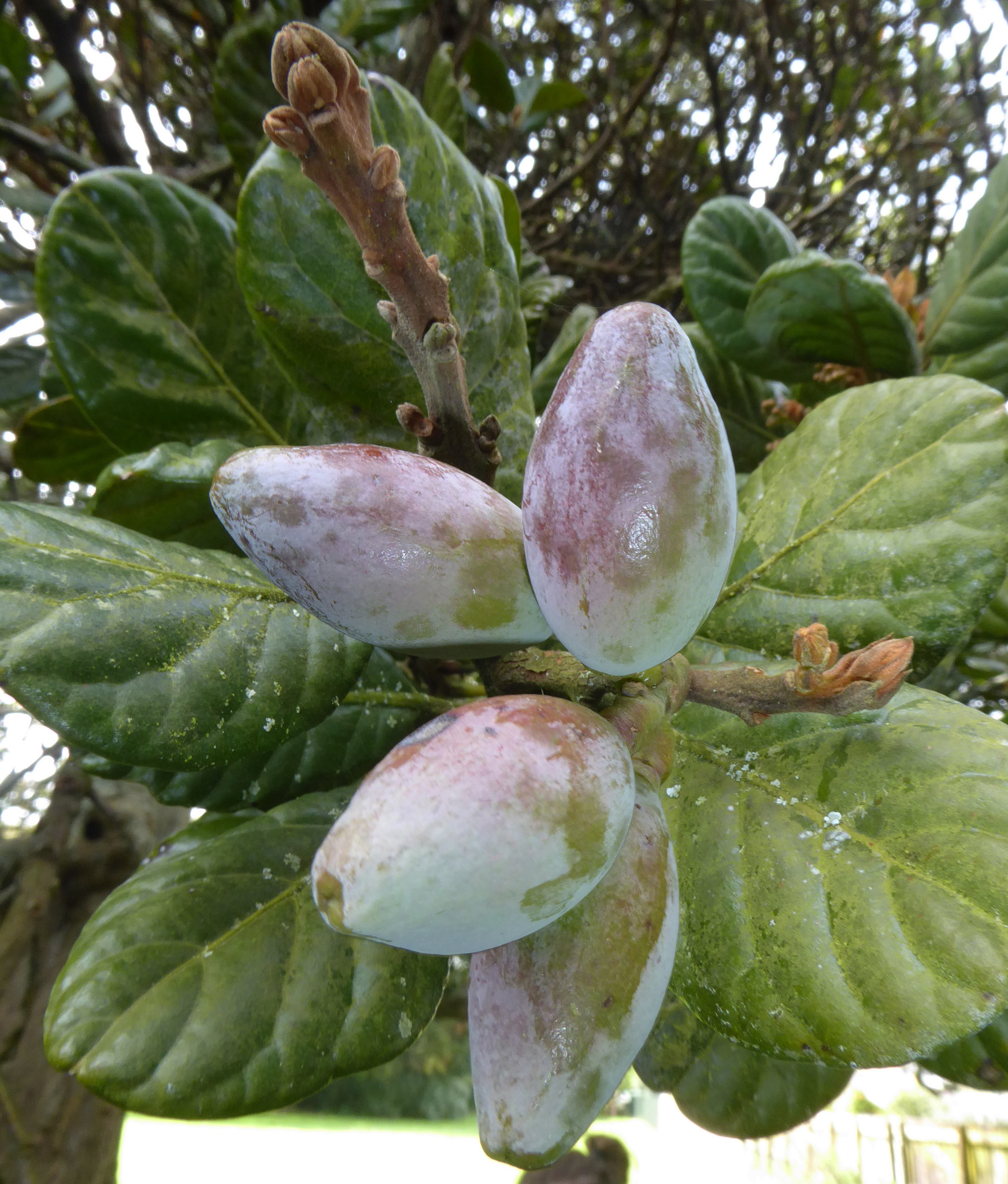
Taraire fruit in Kirk's Bush

Kirk's Bush is a remnant native forest dominated by mature taraire trees. Other major tree species found in the bush include tawa, pukatea, rewarewa, pūriri, mangeao, tītoki and karaka. Kirk's Bush has smaller sections of Podocarp forest, where rimu, kahikatea and miro grow. The ground is dominated by leaf-litter, with occasional understory plants, including kohekohe, hangehange and pigeonwood.

Kirk's Bush is the location of the largest known taraire tree in the world, measuring 20.5 m (67 ft) in height and having a trunk diameter of 107 cm (42 in).

Kirk's Bush serves as the type location of several species, including Rhinocladium dingleyae, a fungus found growing on rotting pukatea wood, Circinotrichum papakurae and Strigula novae-zelandiae, both of which are found on decaying taraire leaves.

== History ==
Kirk's Bush was known by the name Chisholm's Bush in the 19th century, after Papakura settler Adam Chisholm. The forest received the name Kirk's Bush after the Kirk brothers, settlers in Papakura who owned the property between 1894 and 1918. The bush was used as a site of community picnics in the 1890s.

In the 1910s and early 1920s, the Papakura community discussed acquiring the bush as a recreation reserve after the death of James Kirk, as the land was at risk of being developed into housing. Owing to the community protests, including a visit by Reverend William Charles Wood to the New Zealand Parliament, the Minister of Lands proclaimed that the land would be acquired by the New Zealand government under the Public Works Act on 19 November 1921, the same day that the land was to be sold at auction. It was later revealed that Prime Minister William Massey was responsible for the decision to save the bush from development.

In 1930, Robert John Willis and Alfred Willis donated an additional 2.75 acres (1.11 ha) to the scenic reserve. During this time period, Japanese honeysuckle had become a major invasive pest in the bush.

Over time, Kirk's Bush developed an unsavoury reputation, for reasons including heavy graffiti and sexual assaults.

In the early 2000s, the Friends of Kirk's Bush was established as a local community group to restore the nature of Kirk's Bush and improve the bush as a community amenity.

== Gallery ==
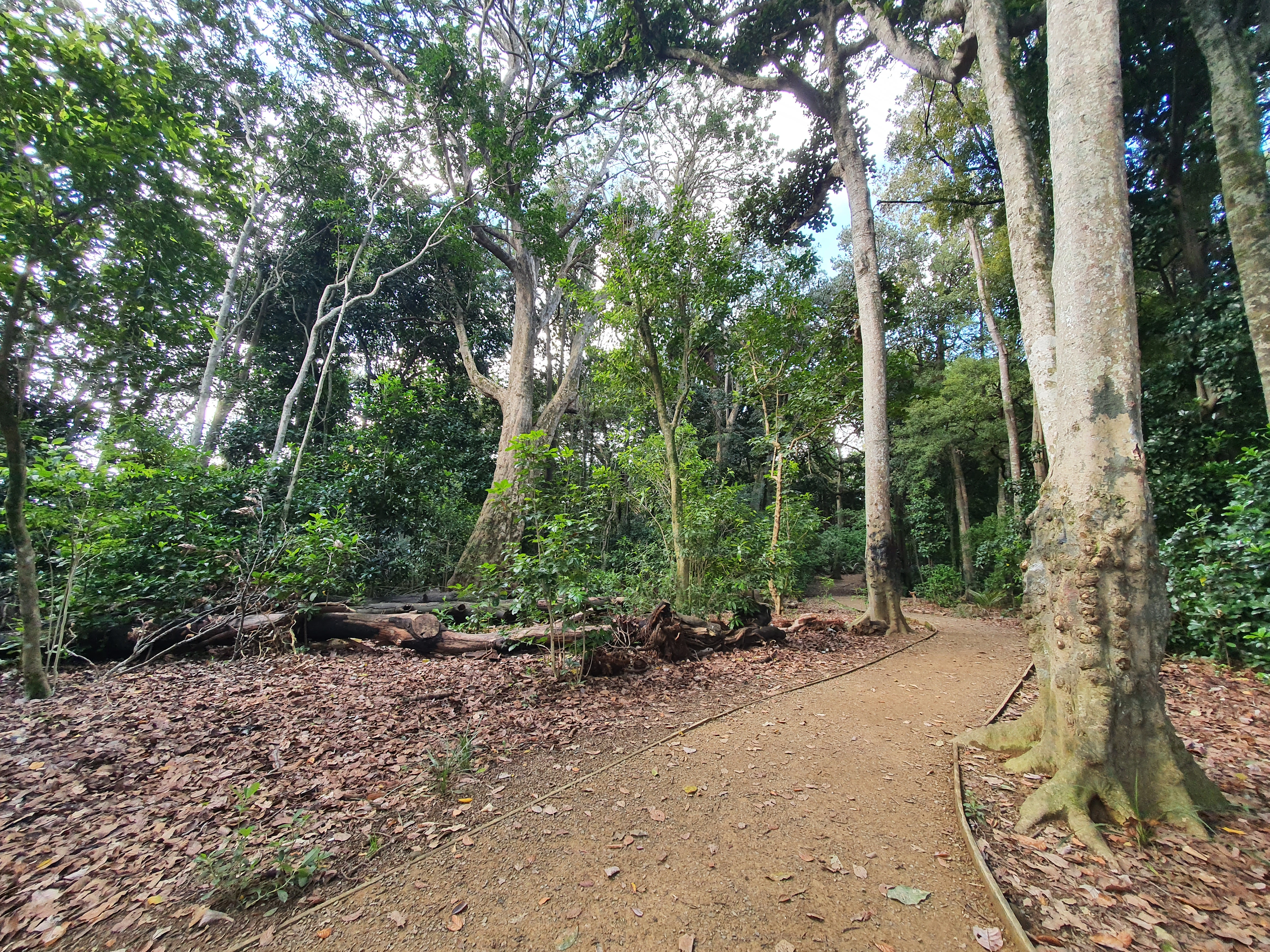
Forested area

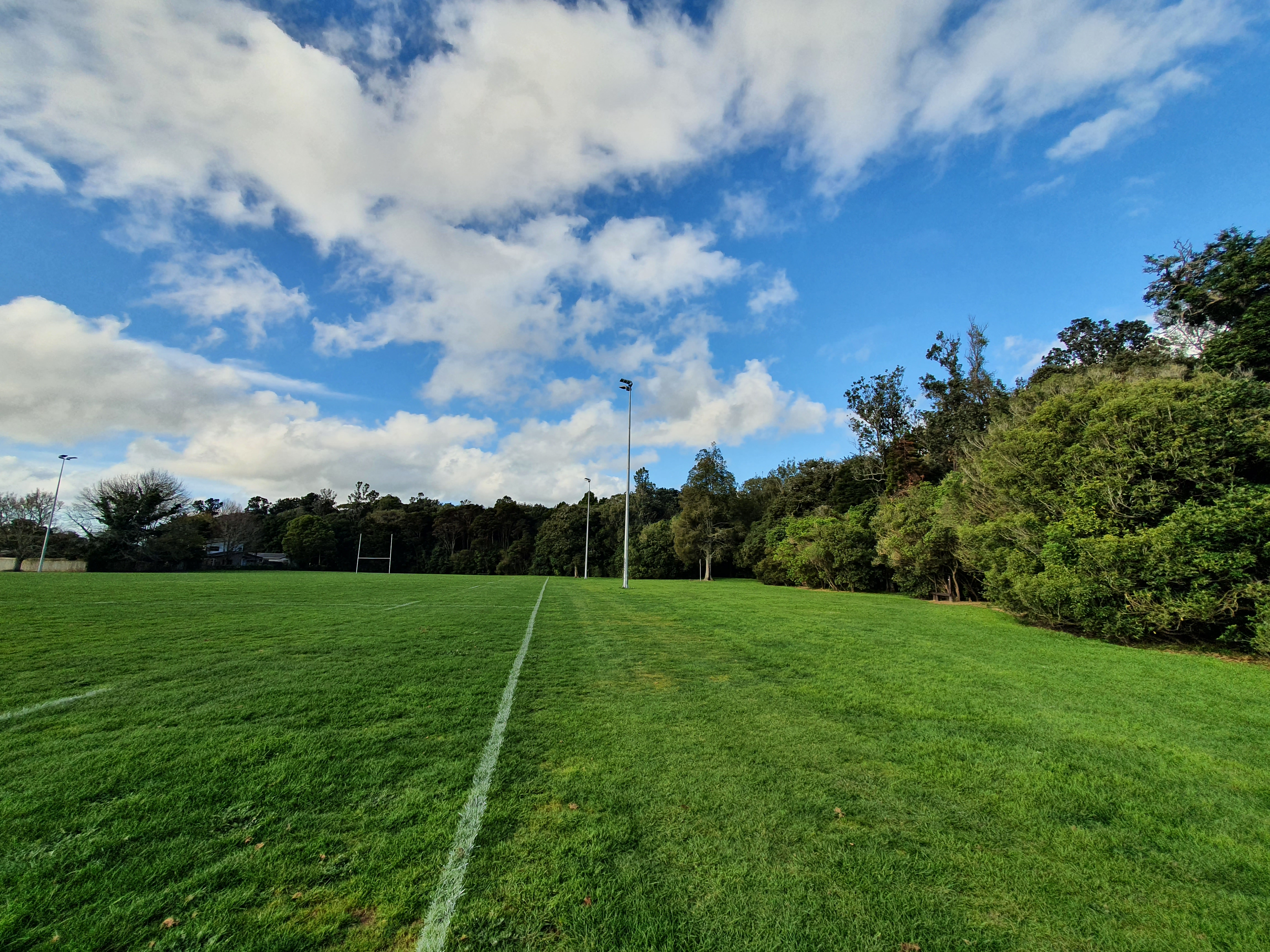
Sports fields adjacent to Kirk's Bush

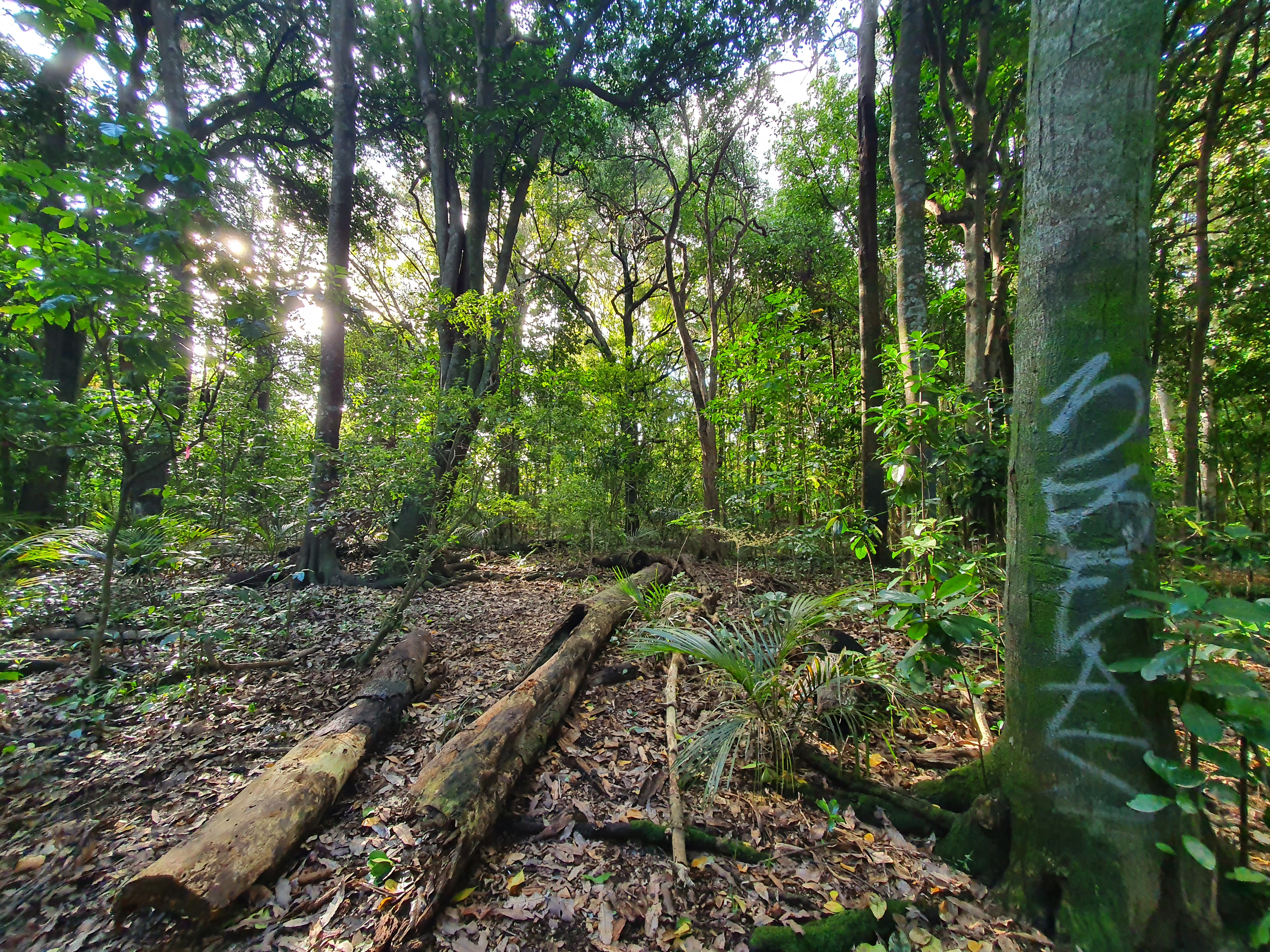
Graffiti in Kirk's Bush
