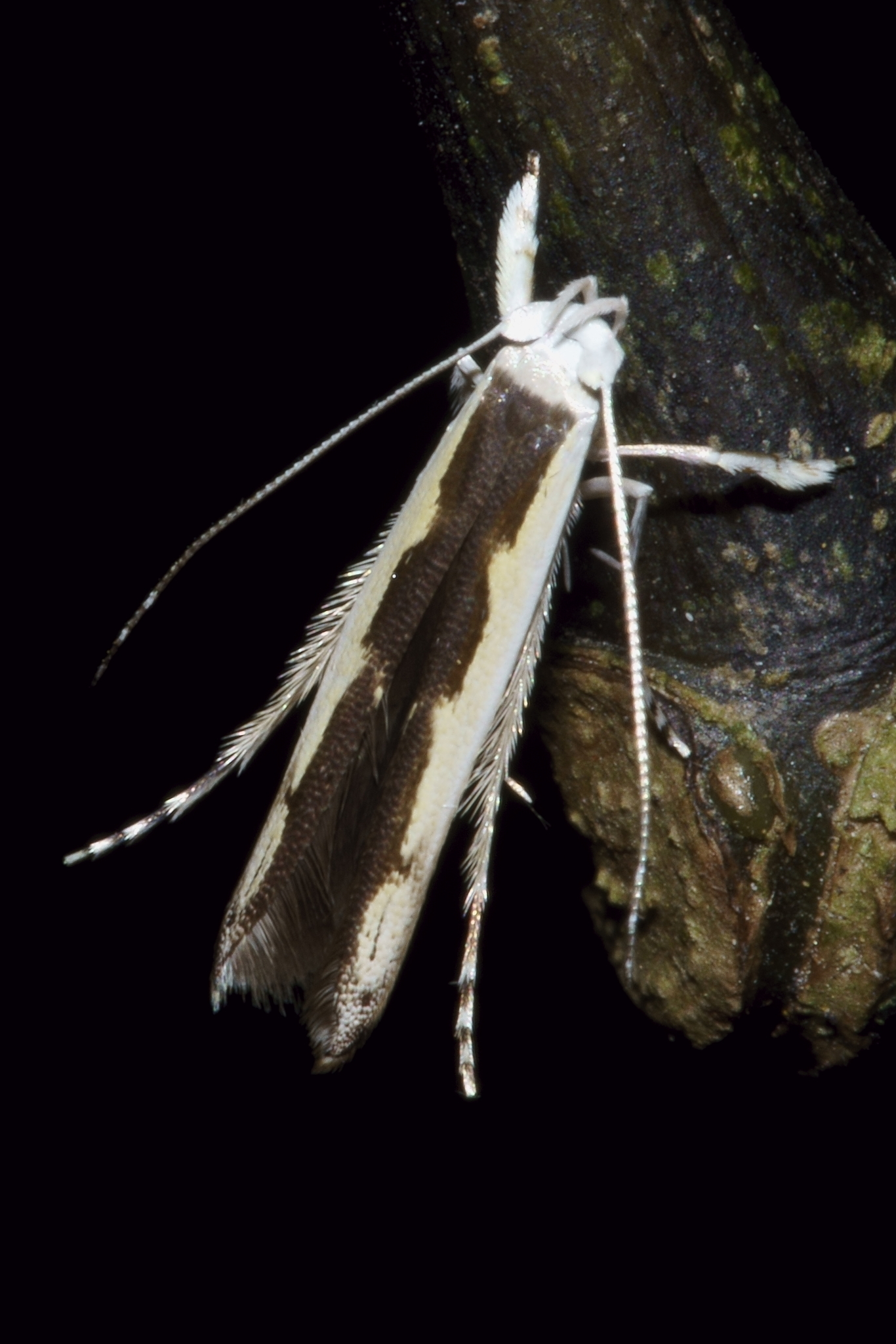

Scientific classification
- Kingdom: Animalia
- Phylum: Arthropoda
- Clade: Pancrustacea
- Class: Insecta
- Order: Lepidoptera
- Family: Roeslerstammiidae
- Genus: Vanicela
- Species: V. disjunctella

Binomial name
- Vanicela disjunctella Walker, 1864

Synonyms
- Gracilaria frontella Walker, 1864

= Vanicela disjunctella =

Species of moth endemic to New Zealand

Vanicela disjunctella, also known as the Titoki moth, is a species of moth in the family Roeslerstammiidae. This species was first described by the British entomologist Francis Walker in 1864. It is endemic to New Zealand and is found throughout the North Island and in the northern half of the South Island. This species frequents dense native forest, scrubland and garden habitat where its larval host is present. The female places an individual egg on the lower side of a leaf of its host plant Alectryon excelsus. The larvae are initially leaf miners but when more mature they roll a leaf to form shelters in which they live and from which they feed. They pupate in the folded leaves of their host plant or in the leaves of plants growing near their host. Adults are on the wing all year round and are attracted to light. It has been hypothesised that this species overwinters in its adult state and that it has several broods a year.

Vanicela disjunctella is likely predated upon by spiders and birds. Larvae of this moth have been parasitised by Trigonospila brevifacies and Meteorus pulchricornis and numerous species of parasitoid wasp have also been reared on the larvae.

== Taxonomy ==
Illustration by Hudson.

It was first described by Francis Walker in 1864 using a specimen collected by Daniel Bolton in Auckland. It is the type species of the genus Vanicela by original monotypy. Also in 1864, Walker thinking he was describing a new species, named this moth Gracilaria frontella. In 1889 the British entomologist Edward Meyrick gave a fuller description of this species. New Zealand entomologist George Hudson discussed and illustrated this species in his 1928 book The butterflies and moths of New Zealand. In 1988 New Zealand entomologist John S. Dugdale agreed with the placement of this species in the genus Vanicela and stated that Gracilaria frontella was a synonym of that species. The female holotype is held at the Natural History Museum, London.

== Description ==
Live pupa with four dark spots on either side in a mesh like cocoon

Mature larvae are green in colour and are between 8 and 10 mm in length. The adult has a wingspan of between 13 to 15 mm.

Hudson described the adult as follows:

The expansion of the wings is slightly under 7/8 inch. The fore-wings are very narrow, clear white slightly tinged with yellow; there is a broad bronzy black streak along the dorsum distinctly notched at about 1/4 and 1/2; a brown dot is situated beyond 3/4 and several blackish scales at the apex. The hind-wings and all the cilia are grey. The head, palpi and antennae are white. The thorax is white with its posterior half bronzy-black. The heavily-scaled tibiae and tarsi of the fore-legs and the conspicuous eye-cap in the large basal joint of the antennae, already noticed under the generic description, are very remarkable and will at once distinguish this species from any other known in New Zealand.

== Distribution ==
Vanicela disjunctella is endemic to New Zealand. It is found throughout the North Island and in the northern half of the South Island including Banks Peninsula. The geographic range of V. disjunctella mirrors that of its larval host plant.

== Habitat and hosts ==
This species frequents dense native forest habitat as well as scrubland and cultivated gardens where its larval host is present. The larvae mine and feed on the leaves of tītoki (Alectryon excelsus).

== Life cycle ==
V. disjunctella at rest.

Individual eggs are laid by the moth on the lower surface of growing leaves of A. excelsus. Once ready to hatch the larva eats through its egg and enters the developing leaf to feed and in doing so creates a distinctive leaf mine. The mine is full of twists and turns and has an obvious solid streak filled with dark coloured frass. When more mature the larva emerges from its mine and rolls the leaf to form a shelter in which it lives and from which it feeds. It frequently consumes the leaf that contains the mine in which it has previously lived. When ready to pupate the larva forms a pale green pupa, which has four dark spots on each side, in a cocoon that has a mesh or weaved appearance. Larva pupates either in a folded leaf of its host plant or alternatively in a leaf of plants growing near its host.

The adults are on the wing all year round but are most frequently observed from January to March. Adults are attracted to light. Hudson hypothesised that this moth overwinters in the imago or adult state. The New Zealand lepidopterist Carey Knox has hypothesised that there are likely two or more broods in a year.

== Behaviour ==
When at rest, the adult places the fore-legs in front; the palpi forwards with the tips touching and forming a semi-circle; the wings, intermediate- and hind-legs are pressed closely to the body, the tarsi being slightly turned outwards, and the antennae placed backwards along the sides.

== Predators and parasitoids ==
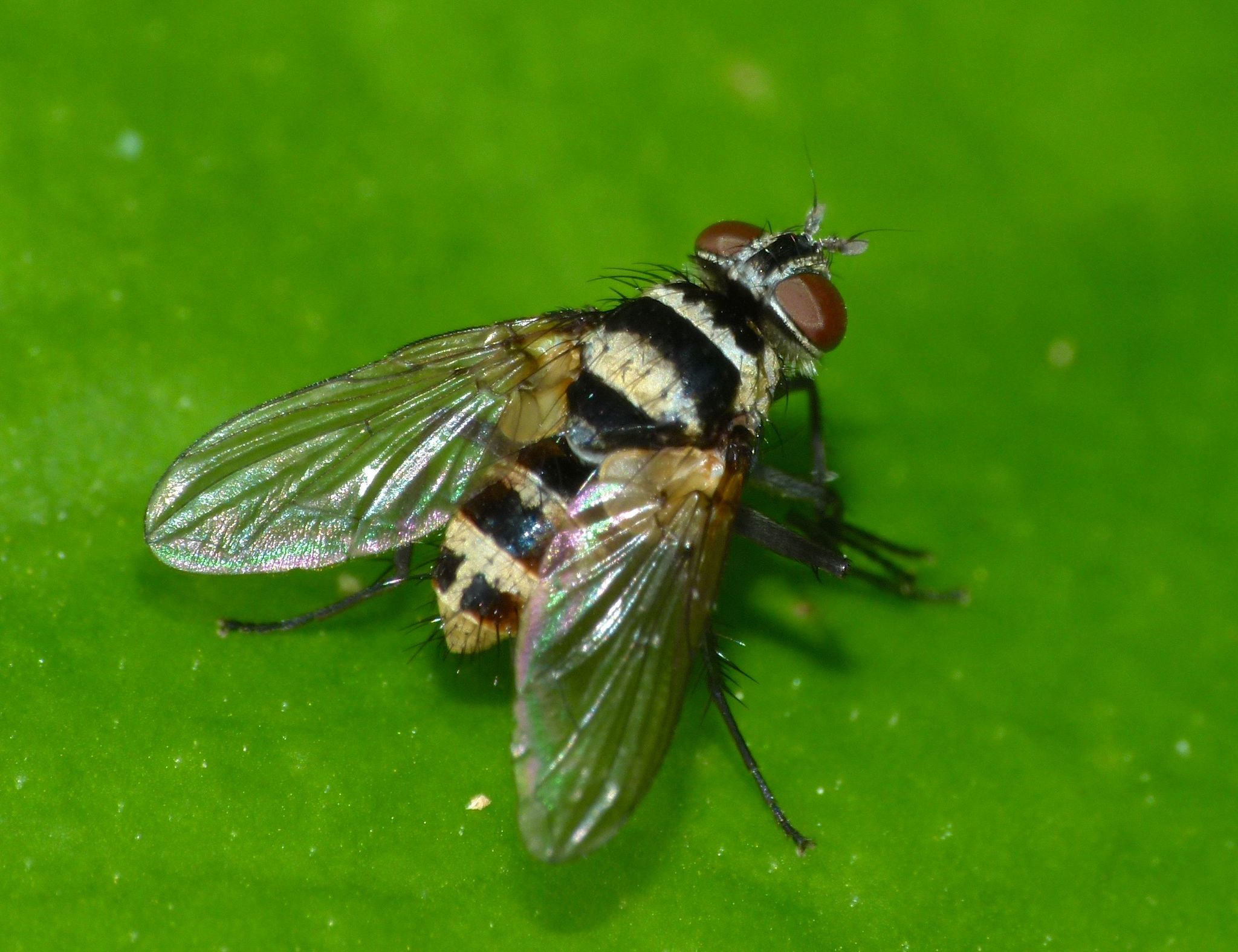
Larval parasitoid Trigonospila brevifacies

It is likely that this species is predated upon by spiders and birds. V. disjunctella larvae are parasitised by the exotic to New Zealand bristle fly species Trigonospila brevifacies as well as the introduced species Meteorus pulchricornis. Multiple species of parasitoid wasp have also been reared from the larvae of V. disjunctella. This includes parasitic wasp species in the genera Diadegma, Dolichogenidea, Zealachertus and Mesochorus.
