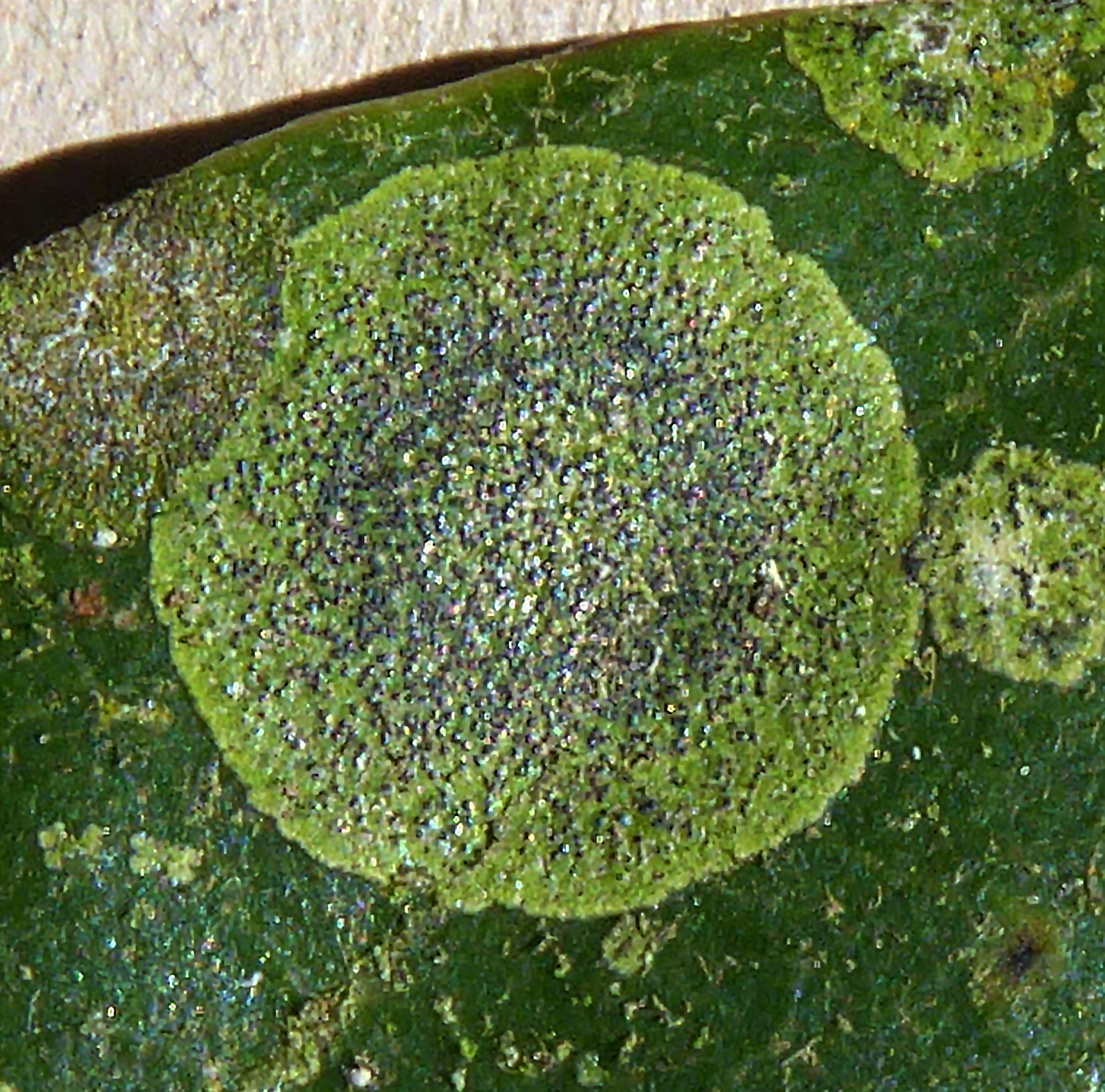
- Strigula oleistrata on a Beilschmiedia tarairi leaf

Scientific classification
- Kingdom: Fungi
- Division: Ascomycota
- Class: Dothideomycetes
- Order: Strigulales
- Family: Strigulaceae
- Genus: Strigula
- Species: S. oleistrata

Binomial name
- Strigula oleistrata M. Ford, Blanchon et de Lange

= Strigula oleistrata =

Species of lichen

Strigula oleistrata is a species of foliicolous lichenised fungi in the family Strigulaceae. Previously misidentified as members of Strigula novae-zelandiae, the species was recognised in 2019. It is endemic to New Zealand, found northwards from the northern Waikato Region, and primarily grows on taraire leaves, and less commonly on tītoki leaves.

== Description ==
Strigula oleistrata is typically pale green to ash green in colour, turning to white when dead. It has a smooth or slightly irregular surface and does not have a prothallus. It can be distinguished from Strigula novae-zelandiae due to the presence of almost circular thalli, the presence of perithecia, and scattered or clustered pycnidia.

== Taxonomy ==
The lichen was formally described as a new species by Marley Ford, Dan Blanchon and Peter de Lange in 2019, after undertaking a phylogenetic analysis of living specimens of Strigula found in New Zealand, splitting the species from Strigula novae-zelandiae on the basis of genetic and morphological differences. The analysis indicated that Strigula oleistrata was more closely related to other Strigula species including Strigula prasina, Strigula guangxiensis and Strigola sinoaustralis than to Strigula novae-zelandiae. The species epithet oleistrata means "strewn with olives", and refers to the species' pycnidia being visually similar to an olive pizza.

== Distribution and habitat ==
The species is endemic to New Zealand, currently only known to occur in New Zealand as far south as the northern Waikato Region. It is found in coastal and lowland indigenous forest remnants, and is foliicolous, growing on the leaves of Beilschmiedia tarairi and less commonly on Alectryon excelsus.

== Gallery ==
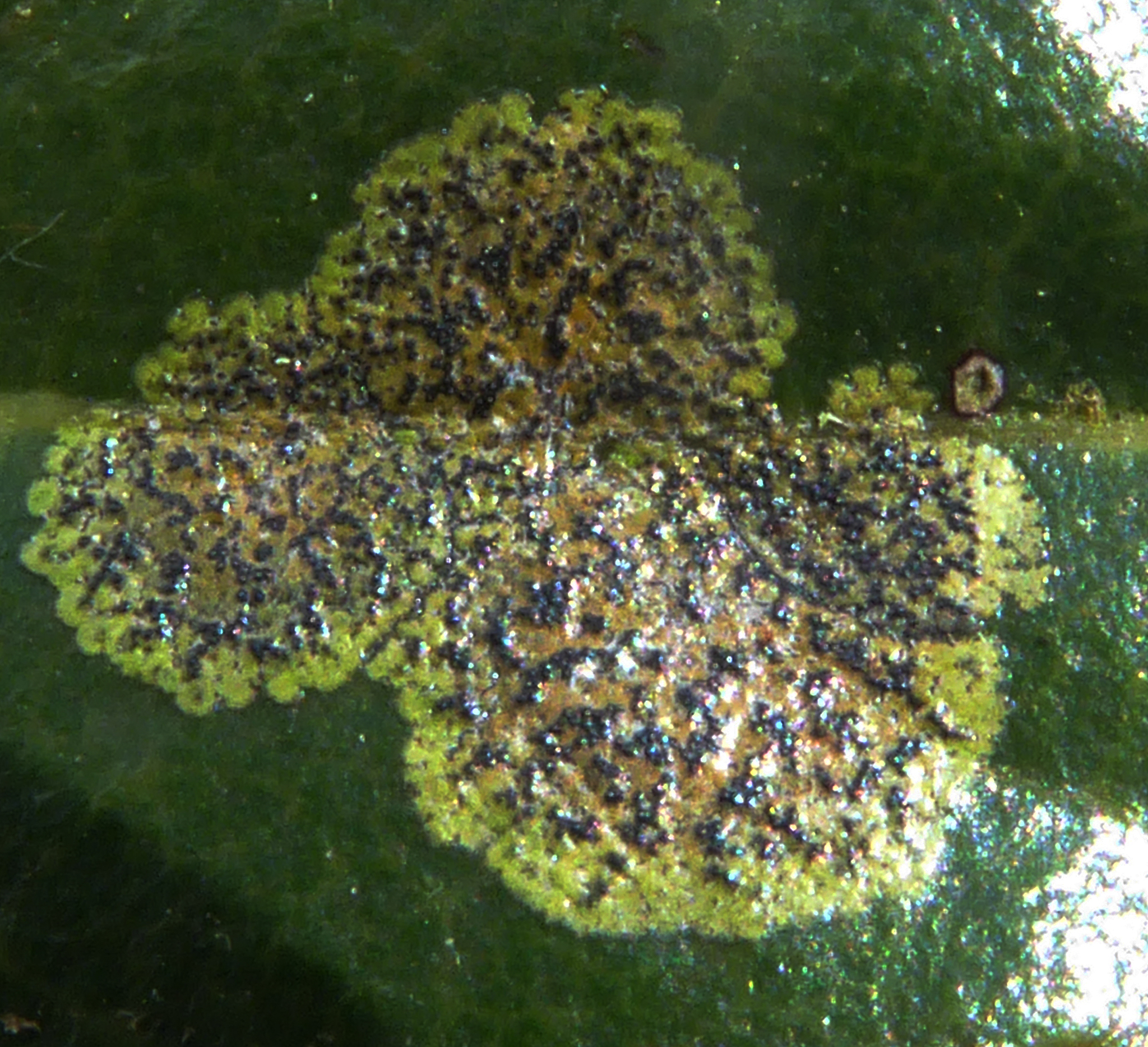

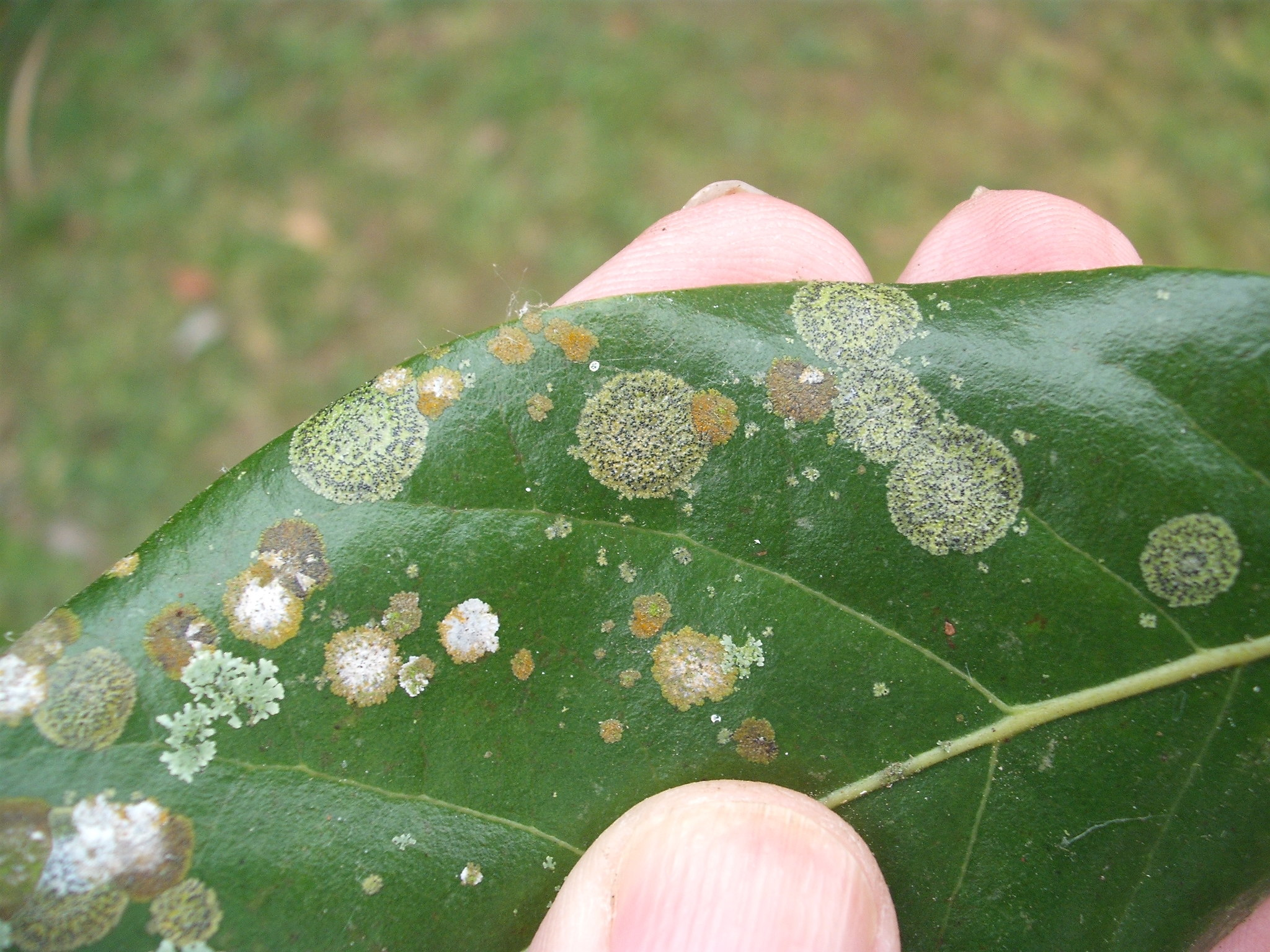
