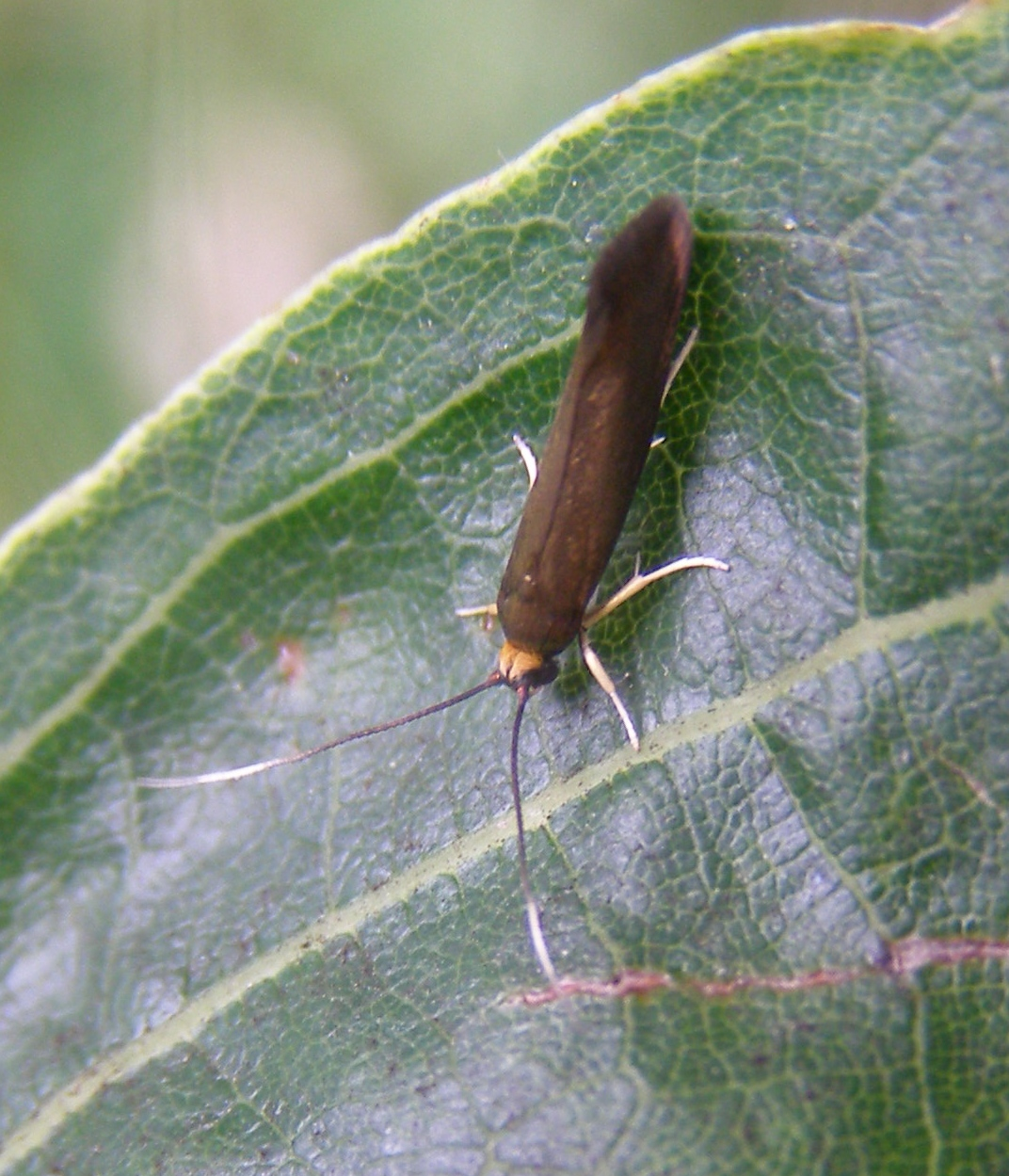

Scientific classification
- Kingdom: Animalia
- Phylum: Arthropoda
- Clade: Pancrustacea
- Class: Insecta
- Order: Lepidoptera
- Family: Roeslerstammiidae
- Genus: Roeslerstammia
- Species: R. erxlebella

Binomial name
- Roeslerstammia erxlebella (Fabricius, 1787)

Synonyms
- Alucita erxlebella Fabricius, 1787; Tinea fuscocuprella Haworth, 1828; Oecophora chrysitella Treitschke, 1833; Adela aeneella Duponchel, [1839]; Roeslerstammia bella Moriuti, 1972; Roeslerstammia durulguensis Budashkin & Kostjuk, 1993; erxlebeniella Zeller, 1839 (emendation)

= Roeslerstammia erxlebella =

Species of moth

Roeslerstammia erxlebella is a moth of the family Roeslerstammiidae. It is found in all of Europe (except Ireland, the Iberian Peninsula and the Balkan Peninsula), and east to Japan, where it is reported from Hokkaido, Shikoku, Kyushu and Honshu. Its wingspan is about 13mm.

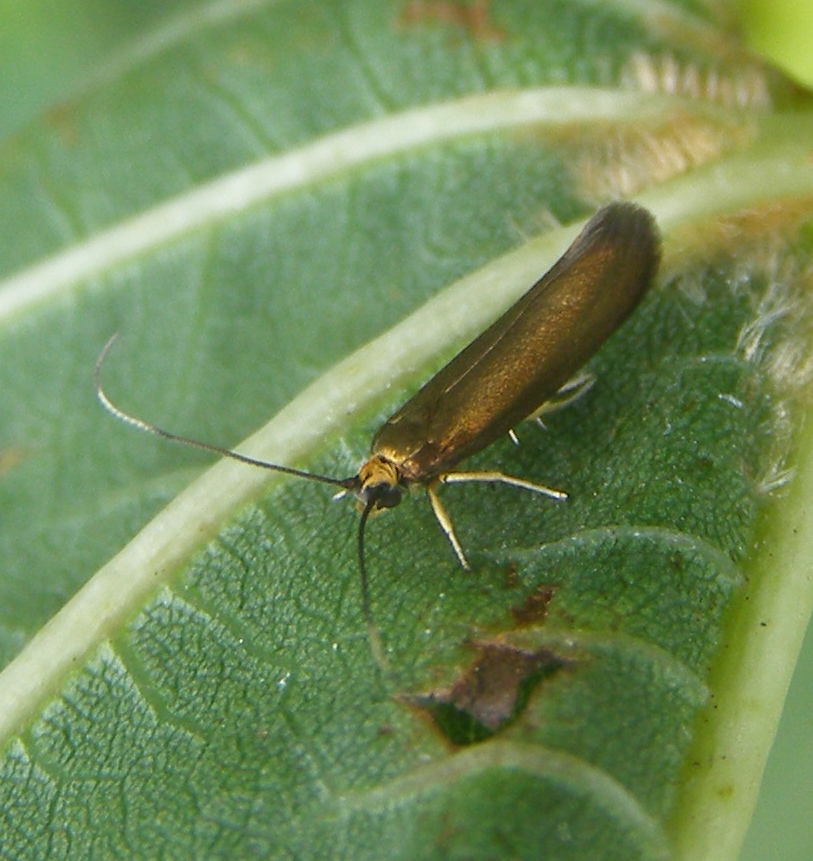

== Biology ==
Known host plants of R. erxlebella are species in the genera Tilia, Betula, Corylus and Acer.

Eggs are laid on the tips of leaves, where the first and second instars of the caterpillars live as leaf miners inside a gallery. Later instars live outside in a slight web on the leaf underside. For pupation, an edge of the leaf is turned down and a white silken cocoon is built by the caterpillar. Before ecdysis of the adult, the pupa protrudes from the cocoon. The adults (moths) are diurnal (day-flying) but are also attracted to light in the night. The adult stage is present from May to August, but are most frequently found in June and July. In England, R. erxlebella has two generations per year, with the moths of the first generation flying in May and June, while the second generation flies in and August and September.
