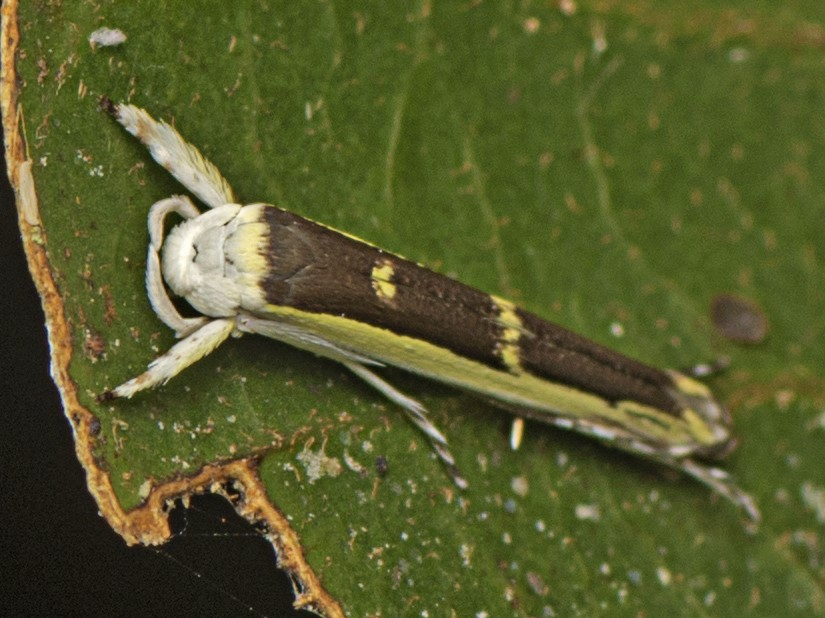

Scientific classification
- Domain: Eukaryota
- Kingdom: Animalia
- Phylum: Arthropoda
- Class: Insecta
- Order: Lepidoptera
- Family: Roeslerstammiidae
- Genus: Vanicela
- Species: V. xenadelpha

Binomial name
- Vanicela xenadelpha Meyrick, 1899

= Vanicela xenadelpha =

Species of moth endemic to Australia

Vanicela xenadelpha is a species of moth in the family Roeslerstammiidae.
