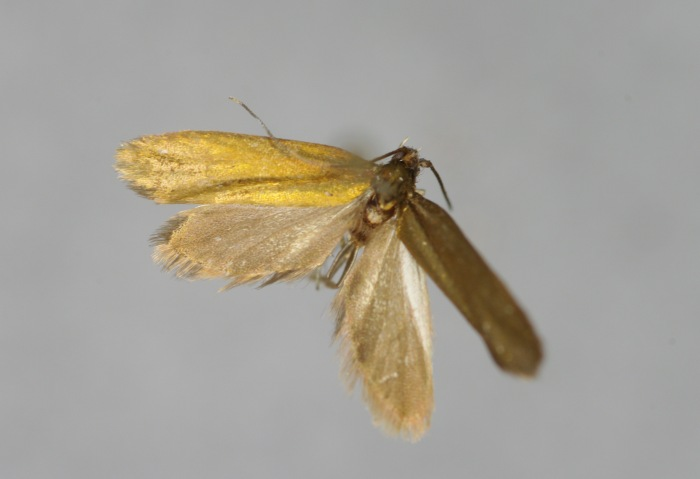

Scientific classification
- Kingdom: Animalia
- Phylum: Arthropoda
- Clade: Pancrustacea
- Class: Insecta
- Order: Lepidoptera
- Family: Roeslerstammiidae
- Genus: Roeslerstammia
- Species: R. pronubella

Binomial name
- Roeslerstammia pronubella (Denis & Schiffermüller, 1775)

Synonyms
- Tinea pronubella Denis & Schiffermüller, 1775; Roeslerstammia transcaucasica Toll, 1958; Roeslerstammia nitidella Moriuti, 1972

= Roeslerstammia pronubella =

Species of moth

Roeslerstammia pronubella is a species of moth belonging to the family Roeslerstammiidae, described by Michael Denis and Ignaz Schiffermüller in 1775. The species can be found throughout Europe and Russia as far east as Japan, where it is reported from Honshu and Kyushu.

== Biology ==
Larval hostplants of R. pronubella comprise Fagus crenata and Carpinus laxiflora in Japan, and Carpinus betulus and species of Tilia in Europe. The first larval instar is a leaf miner in the leaf tip, while from the second instar on, feeding takes place outside on the leaf edge. Pupation takes place in a white ellipsoidal cocoon in the gallery of a turned-down leaf margin. The adult moths fly from April to August.
