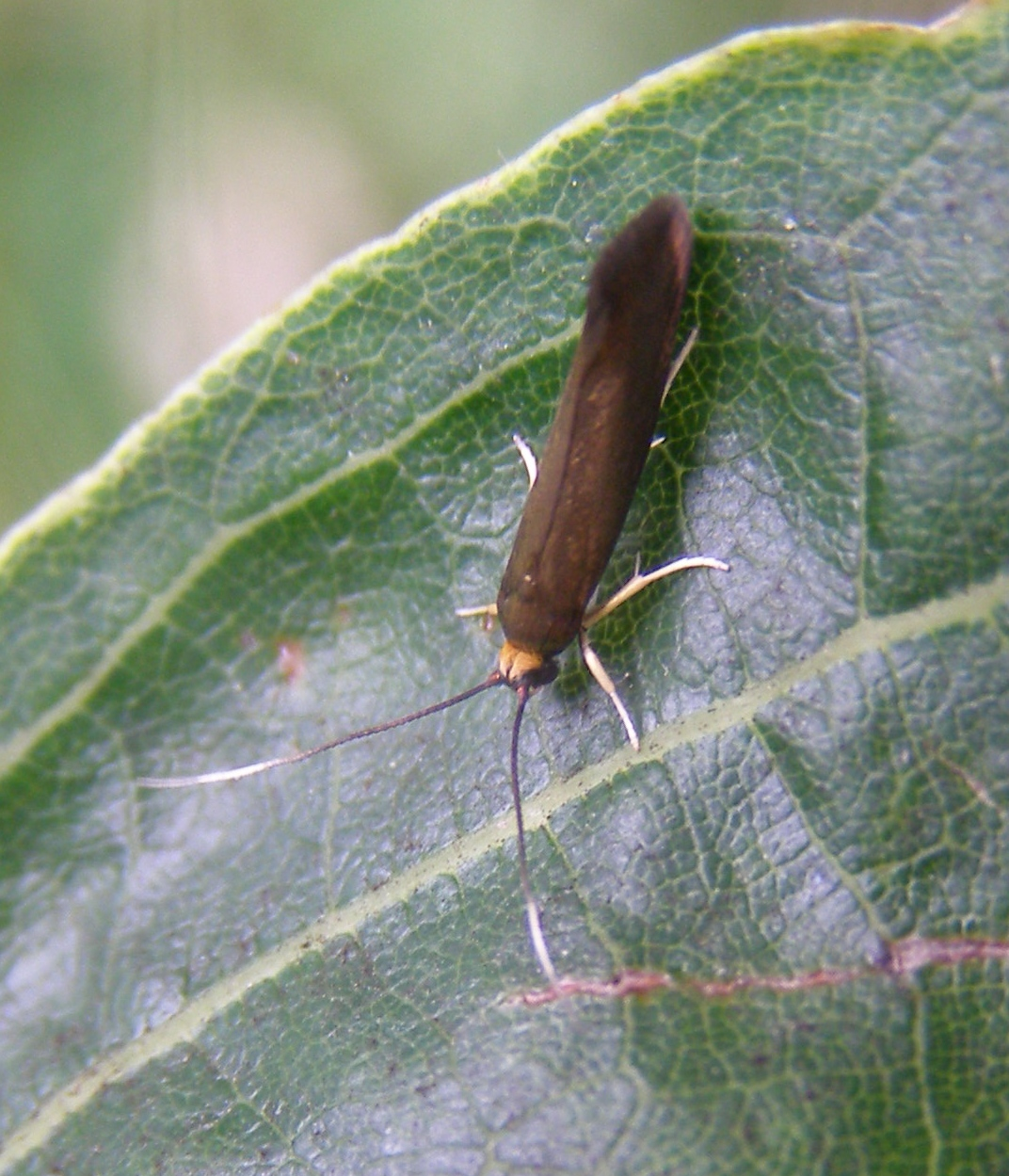
- Roeslerstammia

Scientific classification
- Kingdom: Animalia
- Phylum: Arthropoda
- Clade: Pancrustacea
- Class: Insecta
- Order: Lepidoptera
- Family: Roeslerstammiidae
- Genus: Roeslerstammia; Zeller, 1839

= Roeslerstammia =

Genus of moth

Roeslerstammia is a genus of moths belonging to the family Roeslerstammiidae, first described by Philipp Christoph Zeller in 1839. The four species of this genus are found in Asia and Europe.

== Species ==
- Roeslerstammia erxlebella (Fabricius, 1787)
- Roeslerstammia metaplastica Meyrick, 1921 (= Roeslerstammia hemiadelpha Meyrick, 1922)
- Roeslerstammia pronubella (Denis & Schiffermüller, 1775)
- Roeslerstammia tianpingshana Hirowatari, Huang & Wang, 2017
