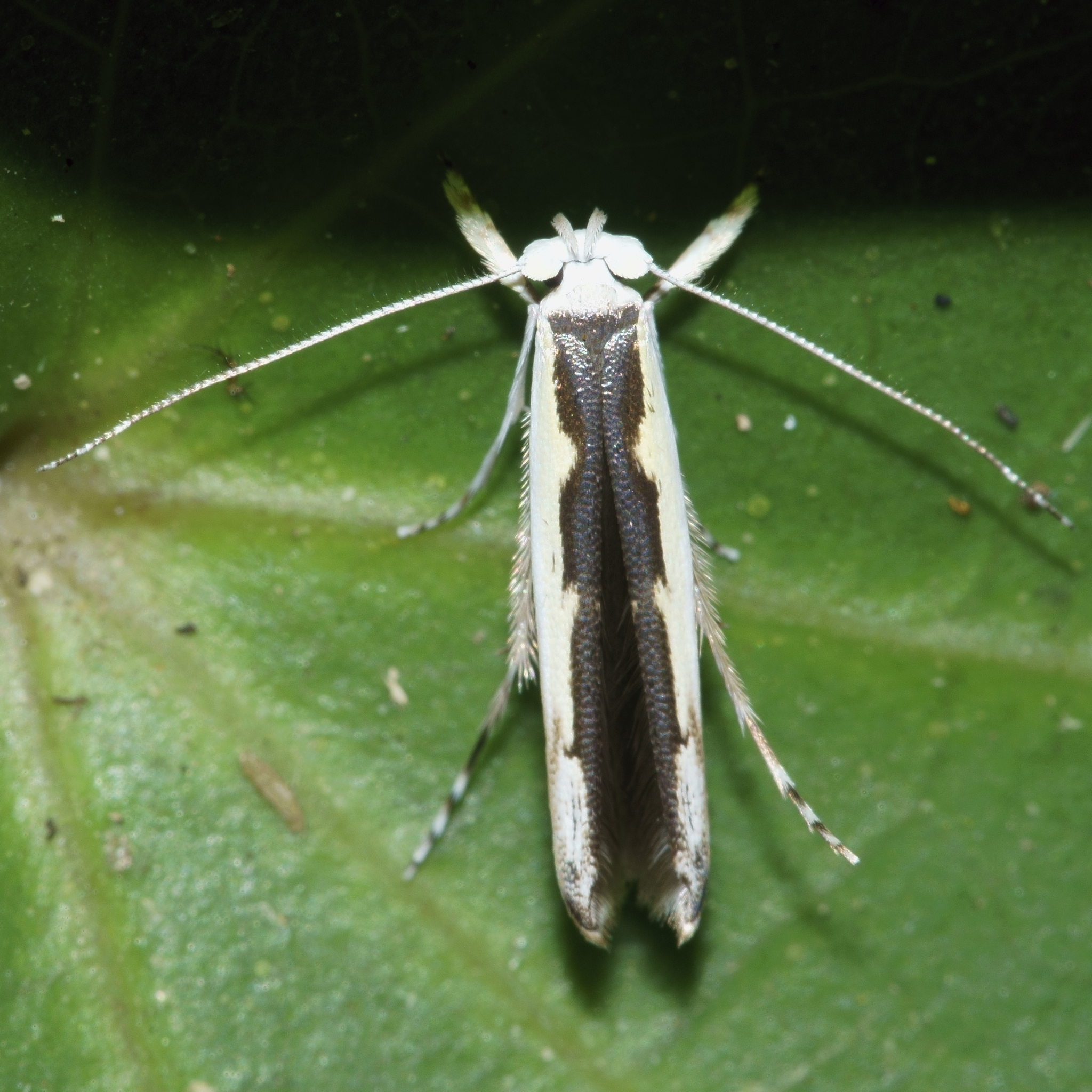
- Vanicela disjunctella

Scientific classification
- Kingdom: Animalia
- Phylum: Arthropoda
- Clade: Pancrustacea
- Class: Insecta
- Order: Lepidoptera
- Family: Roeslerstammiidae
- Genus: Vanicela; Walker, 1864

= Vanicela =

Genus of moths

Vanicela is a genus of moths in the family in the family Roeslerstammiidae.

== Species ==
- Vanicela dentigera Meyrick, 1913 - Australia
- Vanicela disjunctella Walker, 1864 - New Zealand
- Vanicela haliphanes Meyrick, 1927 - Samoa
- Vanicela tricolona Meyrick, 1913 - Australia
- Vanicela xenadelpha Meyrick, 1889 - Australia
