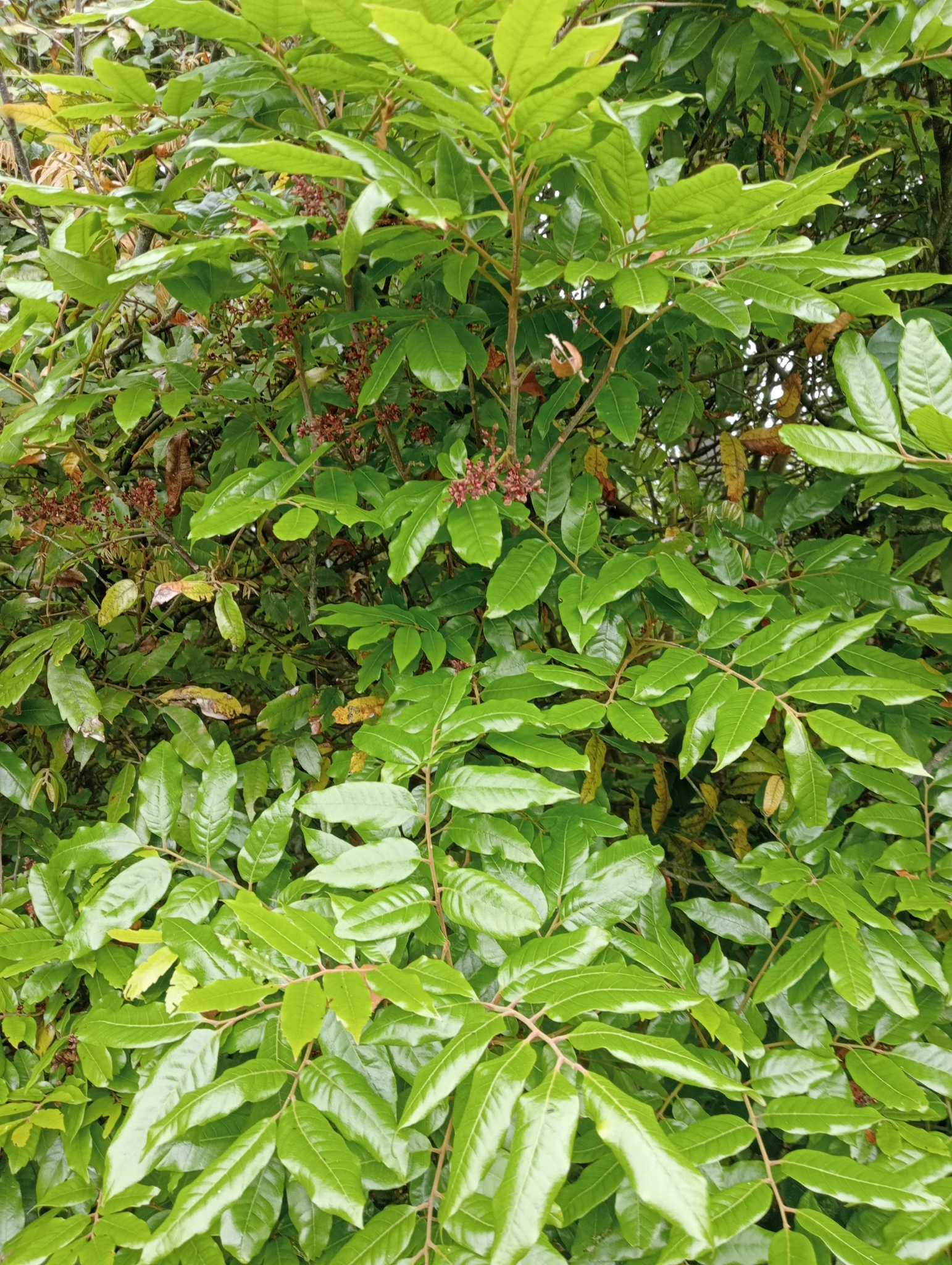
- A mature tree near Whanganui

Conservation status
- Least Concern (IUCN 3.1)

Scientific classification
- Kingdom: Plantae
- Clade: Tracheophytes
- Clade: Angiosperms
- Clade: Eudicots
- Clade: Rosids
- Order: Sapindales
- Family: Sapindaceae
- Genus: Alectryon
- Species: A. excelsus

Binomial name
- Alectryon excelsus Gaertn.

= Alectryon excelsus =

Species of flowering plant

Alectryon excelsus, commonly known as tītoki, New Zealand ash, or the New Zealand oak, is a species of tree in the family Sapindaceae. It reaches 20 metres (66 feet) in height. It is endemic to New Zealand; its range mainly covers the North Island, but is also present in the South Island with the Banks Peninsula being its southern limit. There are two recognised subspecies of this plant: A. excelsus subsp. excelsus native to mainland New Zealand, and subsp. grandis native to the Manawatāwhi / Three Kings Islands. A. excelsus has glossy alternating leaves. The seeds are found in brown seed capsules which split when mature.

The plant was first described by the German botanist Joseph Gaertner in 1788. A. excelsus's pollination strategy is not certain. The seeds are dispersed by fruit-eating animals (frugivores), such as birds. A. excelusus was traditionally prized by indigenous Māori people, and they especially valued the oil. A. excelsus subsp. excelsus's 2023 assessment in the New Zealand Threat Classification System was "Not Threatened".

== Description ==
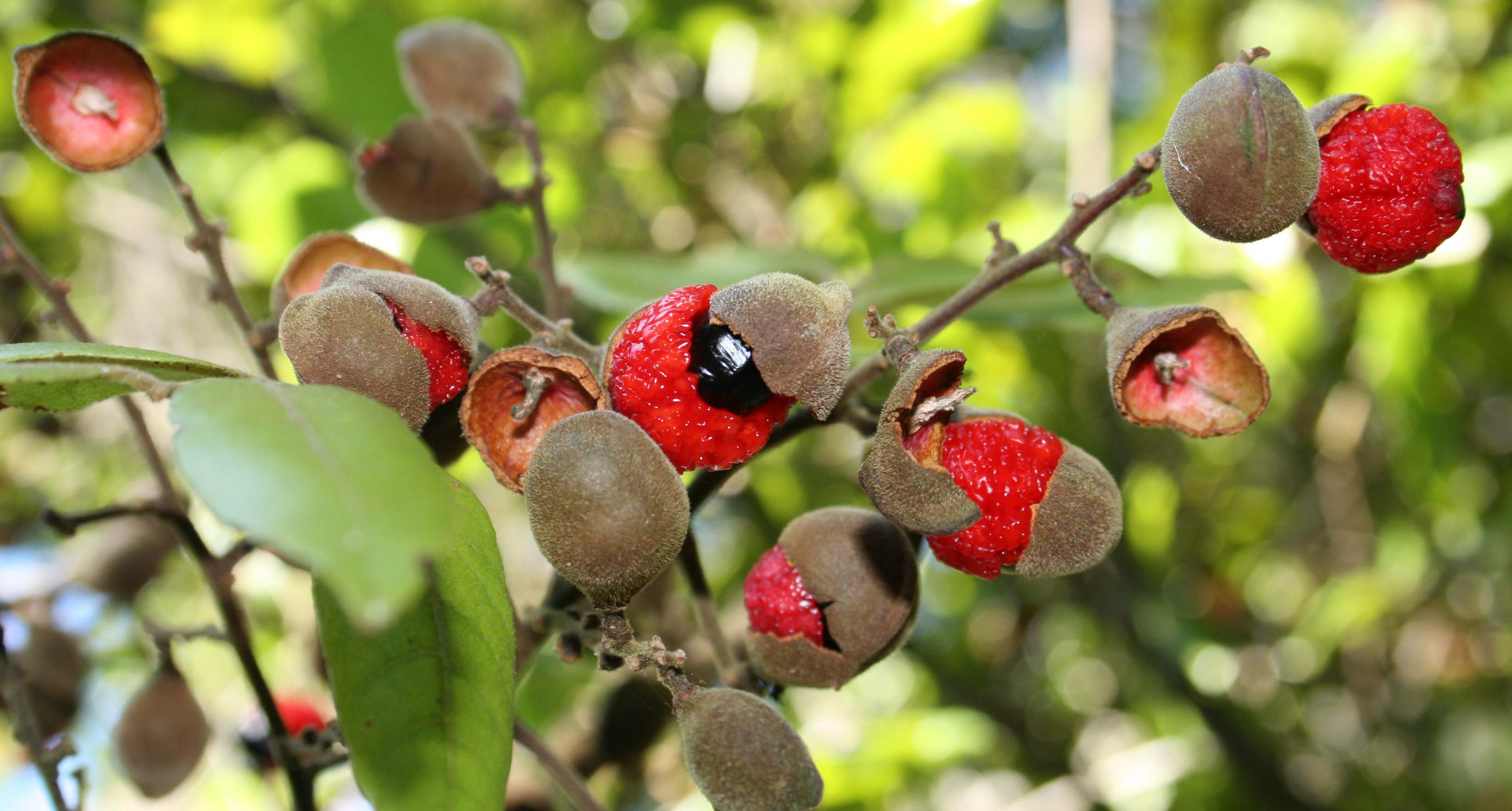
The brown seed capsules and arils

Alectryon excelsus is a small tree in the family Sapindaceae. It reaches 15–20 metres (50–70 feet) in height, with a stout trunk. The bark is fluted, and is black in colour. Branches are spreading and covered with small hairs. The wood is strong and tough, and is a light-reddish colour.

Leaves are arranged in an alternating to almost opposite pattern. Adult leaves are dark green in colour, glossy, and are imparipinnate, meaning they have a single leaflet at their tips. They are 80–260 mm (3.1–10.2 in) long. Leaflets are found in pairs of three to seven, the laminae (leaf blades) are 45–105 × 19–40 mm long, somewhat coriaceous (leather-like) in character. Leaflets are long and narrow, or oval-shaped, with tips that are usually slightly pointed or tapering, or are rarely blunt. The leaf margins are either smooth or are serrated.

The inflorescences (flower clusters) 90–120 mm (3.5–4.7 in) long. Flowers are a crimson colour. They are either bisexual or staminate. There are five to eight stamens (pollen containg parts) in bisexual flowers, and six to ten in staminate flowers. Fruiting occurs from November to August. Fruits are found in hairy brown seed capsules which have red, fleshy parts that surround a black seed that grow out and split the capsule. The seeds are 7–10 × 4–8 mm long, and somewhat globe-shaped. A. excelsus has a diploid chromosome count of 32.

== Taxonomy ==
The plant was first described by the German botanist Joseph Gaertner in 1788. It was first collected by Joseph Banks and Daniel Solander. A. excelsus is the only member of the genus Alectryon native to New Zealand. There are 32 species of the Alectryon genus currently accepted by the Plants of the World Online taxonomic database. These species are native to Southeast Asia, Papuasia, Australia, New Zealand, and several other islands in the Pacific. De Lange et al. (1999) transferred A. grandis to A. excelsus subsp. grandis. Edwards & Gadek (2001) conducted a phylogenetic analysis of the genus.

The Plants of the World Online taxonomic database recognises two subspecies of Alectryon excelsus:

- Alectryon excelsus subsp. excelsus — native to mainland New Zealand
- Alectryon excelsus subsp. grandis — native to the Three Kings Islands

=== Etymology ===
The etymology (word origin) of A. excelsus's genus name, Alectryon, has its roots from the Greek mythological soldier Alectryon and the god Ares. Alectryon was turned into a rooster by Ares after being enraged with him. The genus name Alectryon was chosen because the aril, the fleshy red part of the fruit, resembles a rooster's comb (or cockscomb). The specific epithet (second part of the scientific name), excelsus, means 'elevated', 'lofty', or 'tall'. The species is commonly known as tītoki, and is sometimes called the New Zealand ash or the New Zealand oak. The Māori language name tītoki originates from the Polynesian word 'taputoki', which refers to trees in the genera Alectryon and Cupaniopsis. The part 'toki' refers to the Polynesian word for adzes.

== Ecology ==
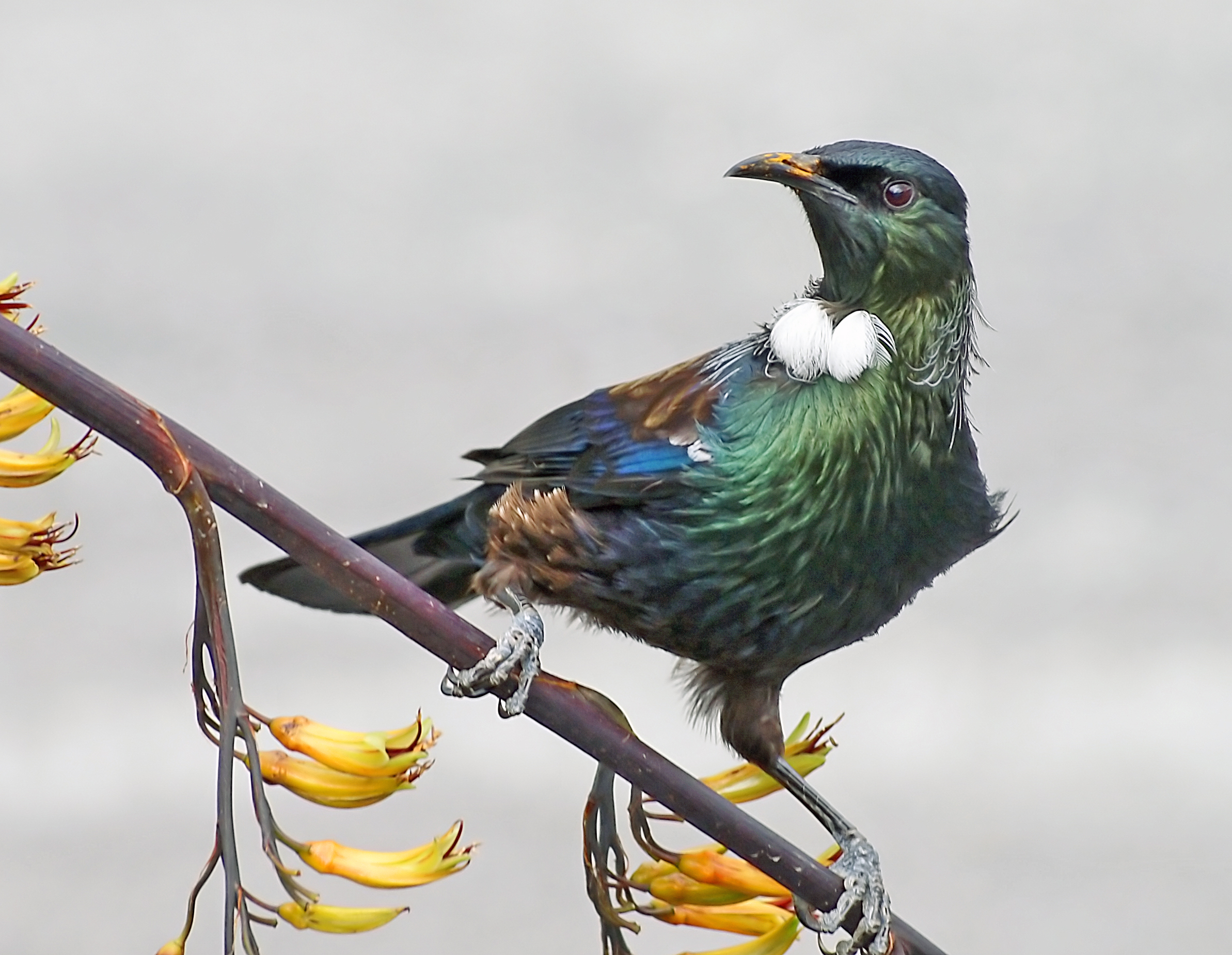
The native bird, tūī, has been recorded as a disperser of A. excelsus's fruits.

Alectryon excelsus's seeds are dispersed by fruit-eating animals (frugivores), such as birds. They are eaten by common blackbirds (Turdus merula), kererū (Hemiphaga novaeseelandiae), kōkako (Callaeas sp.), tūī (Prosthemadera novaeseelandiae), and song thrushes (Turdus philomelos). It is possible that a species of lizard, the Falla's skink (Oligosoma fallai), may be a disperser of A. excelsus subsp. grandis's fruits. Possums freely eat the leaves and fruits. Deer also browse the tree, although not to the extant that possums do. A. excelsus has been suspected in causing deaths in cattle as the plant contains hydrocyanic acids, as such, the botanist Henry Connor classifies the plant as poisonous in his book, The Poisonous Plants in New Zealand.

The sexual systems of Alectryon are not well-studied. A source from 1999 lists monoecy as their ancestral trait. A botanist in 1961 first reported that male trees were able to produce fruits. However, an ecology student, Emma Barnsley, looked at the flowers and noted the male flowers closely resembled the floral structures typically found on female trees. This would suggest that A. excelsus is gynodioecious, meaning individual trees are either hermaphroditic or female. Garnock-Jones (2025) states that describing the tree as subdioecious is more accurate.

The pollination strategy of A. excelsus is uncertain. Webb et al. (1999) listed the flowers as insect-pollinated, but did not list what insects visit the flowers. A student who conducted a thesis in 1971 did not observe any floral visitors and assumed the flowers might be wind-pollinated.

Alectryon excelsus has high flammability rates, according to a 2016 study. Alectryon excelsus plays host to some species of insects, including the lemon tree borer (Oemona hirta) and Conopomorpha cyanospila. The pūriri moth (Aenetus virescens) and the tītoki cocoon-weaver moth (Vanicela disjunctella) larvae can both be found on the tree, chewing the leaves. A kind of lichen, Strigula oleistrata, can be found on the tree.

== Distribution ==
Alectryon excelsus is endemic to New Zealand. A. excelsus subsp. excelsus's range mainly covers the North Island and the South Island, with the Banks Peninsula being its southernmost natural distribution area on the east coast of the South Island. The southernmost locality on the South Island's west coast varies by source. The New Zealand botanist Thomas Kirk stated in his 1889 revision of New Zealand flora that the southernmost distribution area is somewhere between Hokitika and Ross. Salmon (1986) claimed the southernmost distribution area on the west coast is Bruce Bay. Wardle (2011) claimed that it is slightly north of Karamea. A. excelsus subsp. grandis's range covers the Manawatāwhi / Three Kings Islands, where it is only found on the largest island of the archipelago, Great Island. A. excelsus subsp. excelsus's 2023 assessment in the New Zealand Threat Classification System was "Not Threatened".

=== Habitat ===
Alectryon excelsus is primarily found in coastal to lowland environments. It reaches 600 m (2,000 ft) above sea level at maximum elevation. It usually grows in well-drained, nutrient-rich soils near rivers and river terraces or on slopes. It is also common in coastal forests, either podocarp or hardwood forests, and is especially common in exposed areas or on soils with basalt or andesite as a substrate.

== Uses ==
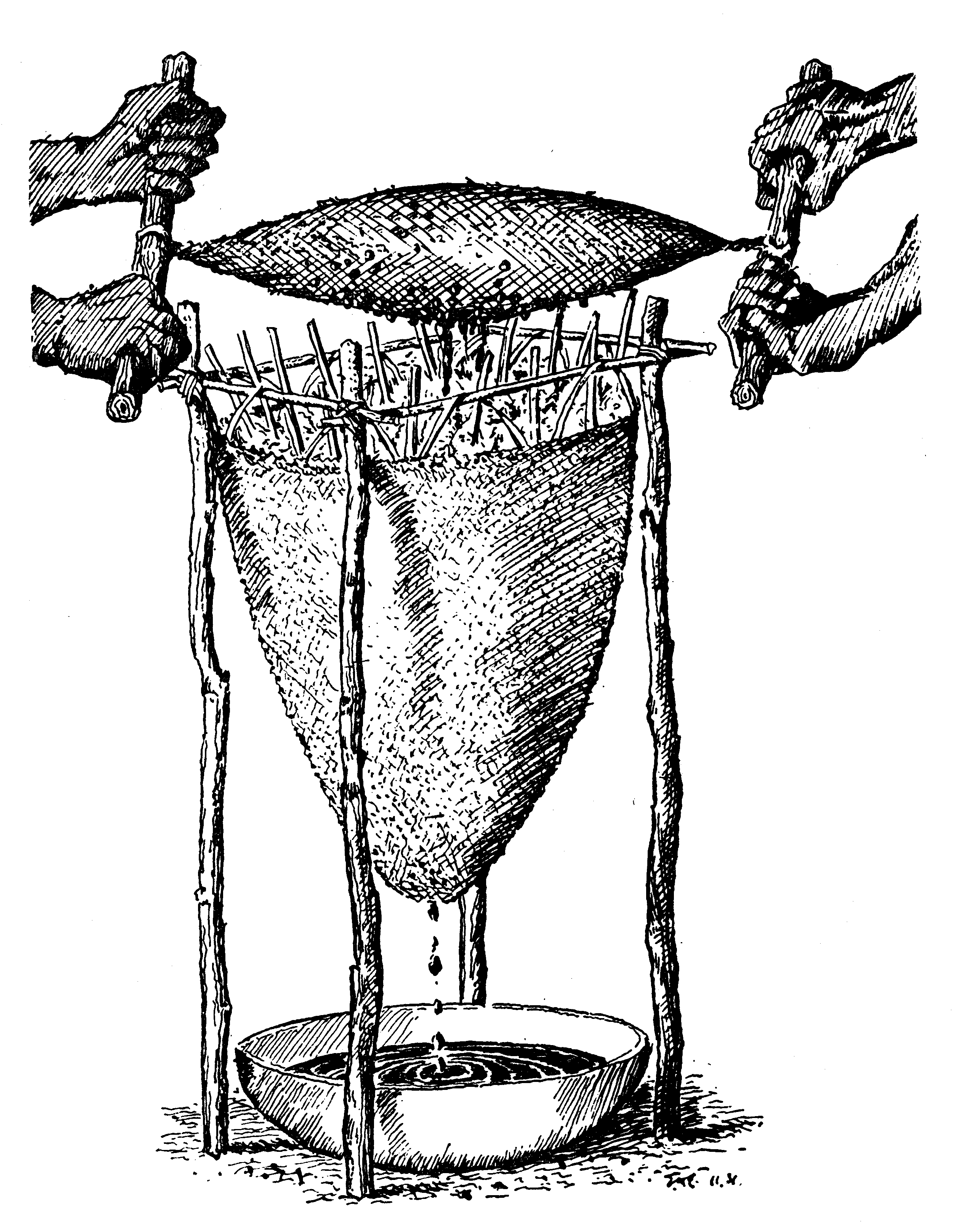
Traditional Māori oil extraction method of A. excelsus's seeds

Alectryon excelsus has several recorded Māori names, including, tapitapi, tītoki, tītongi, tokitoki, tongitongi, and topitopi. A. excelsus had several uses for the indigenous Māori people, but the oil from the seeds were especially prized by them. They also planted the seeds, ate the fruits when food was scarce, and used parts of the plant medicinally. The seeds were used to create an oil that was very highly regarded and was a traditional status symbol.

The oil was used as a hair oil, incorporated into body paint, believed to deter sandflies, and was used as a perfumery base, and could be steeped in aromatic leaves from plants such as tarata (Pittosporum eugenioides). This oil was also used in traditional medicinal practices, being applied to wounds, skin diseases, or being used in massages. It was also used to treat inflammations and ear pain.

Early European settlers used the oil for a range of uses including for machinery, however this fell out of popularity when the whaling industry in New Zealand expanded, and made whale oil cheaper to procure. The wood was used by early European settlers to create items such as coaches and cabinets, and other types of woodwork. The oil has also been recommended in watchmaking. The fruits are also used in the commercial making of liqueur for deserts and cocktails.

== Works cited ==
Books

- Connor, H.E. (1977). The Poisonous Plants in New Zealand. New Zealand Department of Scientific and Industrial Research.
- Crowe, Andrew (2009). Which Native Tree? New Zealand Native Trees: A Simple Guide to their Identification, Ecology and Uses. Auckland, New Zealand: Penguin Books. ISBN 978-0-14-300899-6.
- Garnock-Jones, Philip (2025). He Puāwai. Auckland, New Zealand: Auckland University Press. ISBN 978-1-77671-168-0.
- Kirk, Thomas (1889). The Forest Flora of New Zealand. Wellington, New Zealand: Government of New Zealand.
- Salmon, John Tenison (1986). The Native Trees of New Zealand. Auckland, New Zealand: Raupo. ISBN 978-0-7900-0104-3.
- Vennell, Robert (2019). The Meaning of Trees. Auckland, New Zealand: HarperCollins. ISBN 978-1-77554-130-1.
- Wardle, J. (2011). Wardle's Native Plants of New Zealand and Their Story. Bateson Publishing Limited. ISBN 9781877520068.

Journals

- Brooker, Stanley G.; Cambie, Richard C.; Cooper, Robert C. (1989). "Economic native plants of New Zealand". Economic Botany. 43 (1): 79–106. doi:10.1007/BF02859329. ISSN 0013-0001.
- Burrows, C. J. (1996). "Germination behaviour of seeds of the New Zealand woody species Alectryon excelsus, Corynocarpus laevigatus, and Kunzea ericoides". New Zealand Journal of Botany. 34 (4): 489–498. doi:10.1080/0028825X.1996.10410129. ISSN 0028-825X.
- Clout, M.N.; Hay, J. R. (1989). "The Importance of Birds as Browsers, Pollinators and Seed Dispersers in New Zealand Forests". New Zealand Journal of Ecology. 12. New Zealand Ecological Society: 27–33. ISSN 0110-6465. JSTOR 24053245.
- De Lange, P. J.; Cameron, E. K.; Murray, B. G. (1999). "Alectryon excelsus subsp. grandis (Sapindaceae): A new combination for an uncommon small tree endemic to the Three Kings Islands, New Zealand". New Zealand Journal of Botany. 37 (1): 7–16. doi:10.1080/0028825X.1999.9512608. ISSN 0028-825X.
- Edwards, K.J.; Gadek, P.A. (2001). "Evolution and Biogeography of Alectryon (Sapindaceae)". Molecular Phylogenetics and Evolution. 20 (1). Elsevier BV: 14–26. doi:10.1006/mpev.2001.0952. ISSN 1055-7903.
- Fitzgerald, Alice E. (1976). "Diet of the opossum Trichosuvus vulpecula (Kerr) in the Orongorongo Valley, Wellington, New Zealand, in relation to food‐plant availability". New Zealand Journal of Zoology. 3 (4): 399–419. doi:10.1080/03014223.1976.9517928. ISSN 0301-4223.
- Ford, Marley; Blanchon, Dan J.; Veale, Andrew; Doyle, Erin J.; Rolfe, Jeremy R.; De Lange, Peter J. (2019). "Hidden in plain sight—a new Strigula species segregated from Strigula novae-zelandiae (Lichenized Ascomycota: Strigulaceae)". Phytotaxa. 424 (5). doi:10.11646/phytotaxa.424.5.1. ISSN 1179-3163.
- Grehan, J. R. (1984). "The host range of Aenetus virescens (Lepidoptera: Hepialidae) and its evolution". New Zealand Entomologist. 8 (1): 52–61. doi:10.1080/00779962.1984.9722466. ISSN 0077-9962.
- Owen, Hamish J.; Norton, David A. (1995). "The diet of introduced brushtail possums Trichosurus vulpecula in a low-diversity New Zealand Nothofagus forest and possible implications for conservation management". Biological Conservation. 71 (3). Elsevier BV: 339–345. doi:10.1016/0006-3207(94)00058-x. ISSN 0006-3207.
- Sopow, Stephanie L.; Bain, John (2017). "A checklist of New Zealand Cerambycidae (Insecta: Coleoptera), excluding Lamiinae". New Zealand Entomologist. 40 (2): 55–71. Bibcode:2017NZEnt..40...55S. doi:10.1080/00779962.2017.1357423. ISSN 0077-9962.
- Webb, C. J.; Lloyd, David G.; Delph, Lynda F. (1999). "Gender dimorphism in indigenous New Zealand seed plants". New Zealand Journal of Botany. 37 (1): 119–130. doi:10.1080/0028825X.1999.9512618. ISSN 0028-825X.
- Wyse, Sarah V.; Perry, George L. W.; O'Connell, Dean M.; Holland, Phillip S.; Wright, Monique J.; Hosted, Catherine L.; Whitelock, Samuel L.; Geary, Ian J.; Maurin, Kévin J. L.; Curran, Timothy J. (2016). "A Quantitative Assessment of Shoot Flammability for 60 Tree and Shrub Species Supports Rankings Based on Expert Opinion". International Journal of Wildland Fire. 25 (4): 466. doi:10.1071/WF15047. hdl:10182/6884. ISSN 1049-8001.

Websites

- De Lange, Peter (2005). "Alectryon excelsus subsp. excelsus". New Zealand Plant Conservation Network. Archived from the original on 8 December 2025.
- "Alectryon excelsus Gaertn". Plants of the World Online. Archived from the original on 22 January 2025 – via Royal Botanic Gardens, Kew.
- "Alectryon Gaertn". Plants of the World Online. Archived from the original on 11 December 2025 – via Royal Botanic Gardens, Kew.
- "Ngā Rauropi Whakaoranga — Alectryon excelsus. Tītoki". Manaaki Whenua – Landcare Research. 2020. Archived from the original on 20 February 2025.
