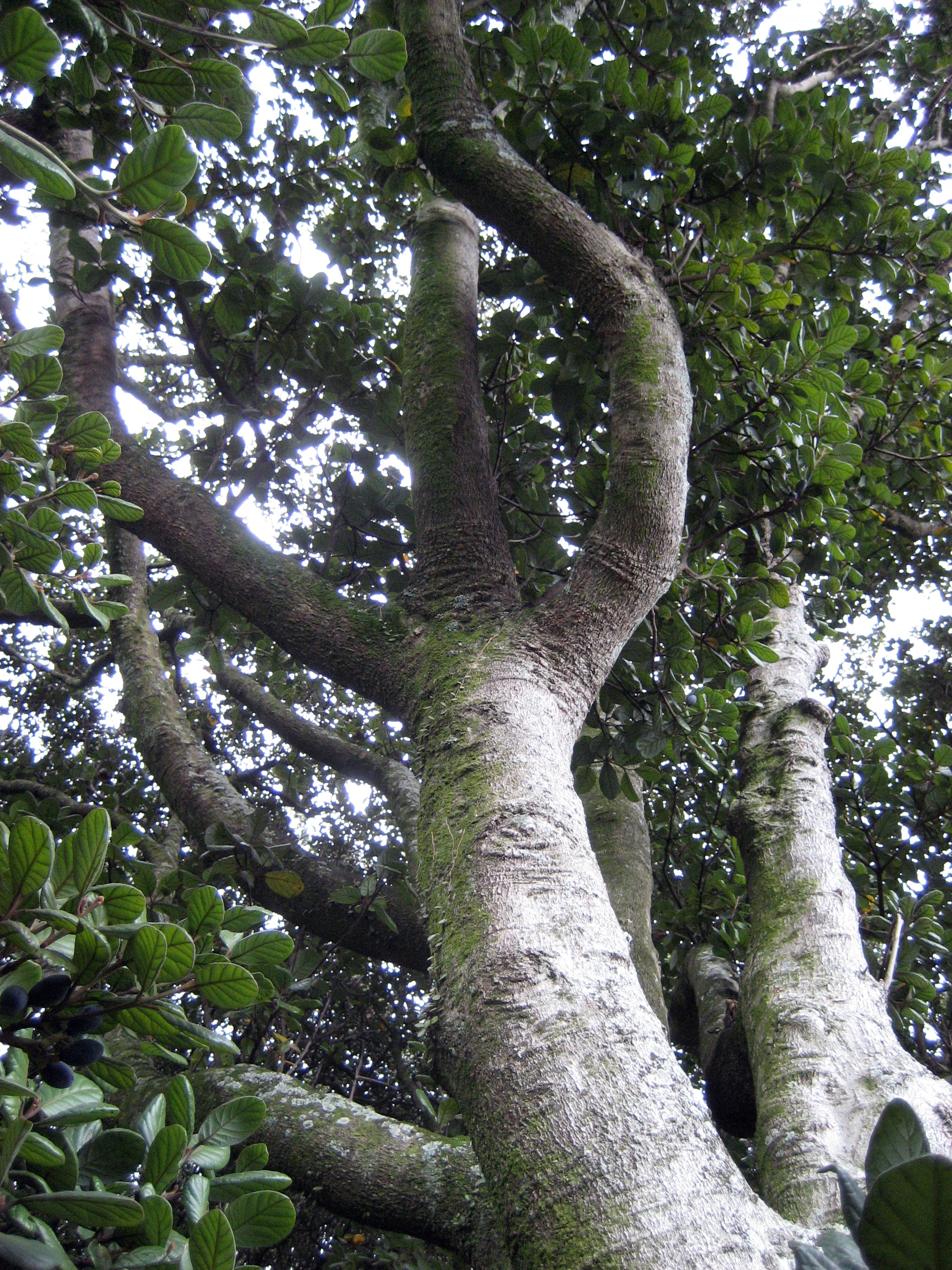

Conservation status
- Least Concern (IUCN 3.1)

- Not Threatened (NZ TCS)

Scientific classification
- Kingdom: Plantae
- Clade: Embryophytes
- Clade: Tracheophytes
- Clade: Spermatophytes
- Clade: Angiosperms
- Clade: Magnoliids
- Order: Laurales
- Family: Lauraceae
- Genus: Beilschmiedia
- Species: B. tarairi

Binomial name
- Beilschmiedia tarairi (A.Cunn.) Kirk

Synonyms
- Laurus tarairi A.Cunn.; Laurus macrophylla A.DC. ex A.Cunn.; Nesodaphne tarairi Hook.f.

= Beilschmiedia tarairi =

Species of tree endemic to New Zealand

Beilschmiedia tarairi, commonly known as taraire, is a tree of the family Lauraceae, endemic to the North Island of New Zealand. It is a common canopy tree in lowland forests north of Auckland, often growing in association with kauri (Agathis australis), pōhutukawa (Metrosideros excelsa), tawāpou (Planchonella costata), and pūriri (Vitex lucens) on basalt rocks and soils. Beilschmiedia is a genus of about 40 mainly tropical trees and shrubs with alternate to opposite leaves.

== Distribution ==
Taraire only occurs in the North Island north of 38°S latitude. It is most common north of Auckland and Thames at about 37°S. However, scattered populations of the tree occur on the west coast between Port Waikato and the Kawhia Harbour, and inland at Pukemokemoke. On the east, it occurs in scattered locations to East Cape.

== Description ==
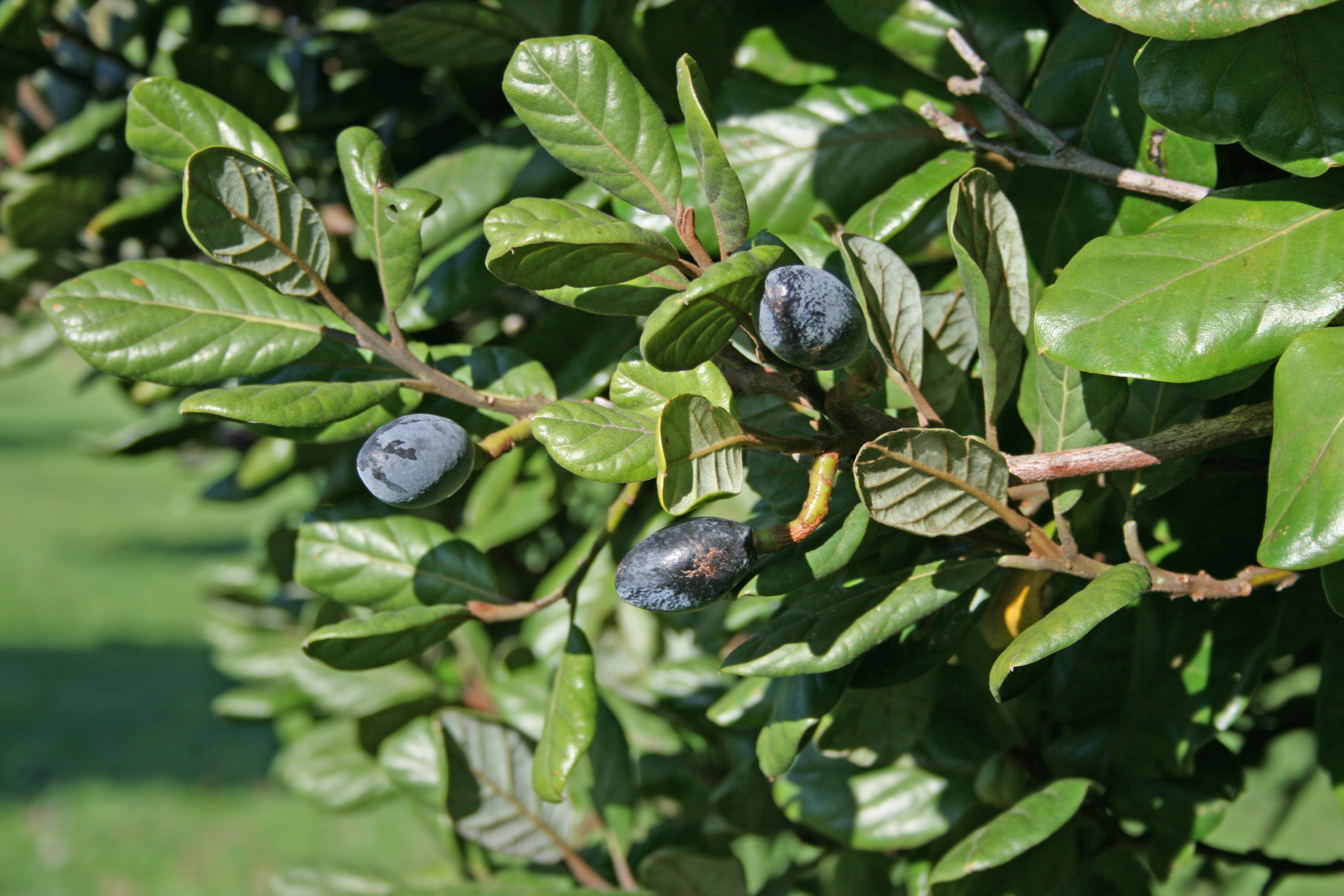
The fruit of the taraire is a favorite food of the New Zealand pigeon or kererū.

Taraire grows up to 22 m in height, and has a very wide crown. The trunk may be up to 1 m in diameter. The bark is dark brown and smooth. The branches are stout, and tend to spread widely. Fine reddish-brown hairs densely cover the branchlets, young leaves, leaf stems, and young flower buds. The dark-green leaves, which are generally between 50 and 72 mm long, and 34 to 48 mm wide, are alternate, leathery, and simple, with depressed veins. The leaf stems are 8 to 12 mm long. The inflorescence is an erect panicle up to 100 mm long arising from the leaf axils. Flowering occurs between September and December, with a peak in November. The greenish flowers are 3–5 mm in diameter and often clothed in dense reddish-brown hairs. The fruit is an erect, elliptical to ovoid drupe about 30 by 16 mm, dark purple when ripe, and covered in a waxy bloom. It contains one seed. Fruit ripen between March and November, and are a favourite food of the kererū (New Zealand pigeon). Taraire is a very distinct species of tropical appearance whose broad, dark-green leaves with their distinctive depressed veins, and large, erect plum-like dark purple fruits distinguish it from all other indigenous trees and shrubs of New Zealand.

Taraire is one of three endemic Beilschmiedia species in New Zealand. The others are the common canopy tree tawa (B. tawa), which has thin willow-like leaves, and tawaroa (B. tawaroa), which is similar to tawa, but has broader leaves.

== Propagation and conservation ==
Propagation is easy from fresh seed, and better germination results if the flesh surrounding the seed is removed. It is not regarded as threatened, but future dispersal may be limited because the kererū is generally the only species that can disperse the large seeds of the taraire, which pass through its gut unharmed. North Island kōkako (Callaeas wilsoni) can also disperse the fruits, but they are now rare in areas where taraire grow.

== Uses ==
The wood of the taraire is straight-grained, but brittle and prone to split, and is not durable when exposed to the elements. It has been used for flooring, light carts, furniture, picture frames, ship's blocks, and firewood.
