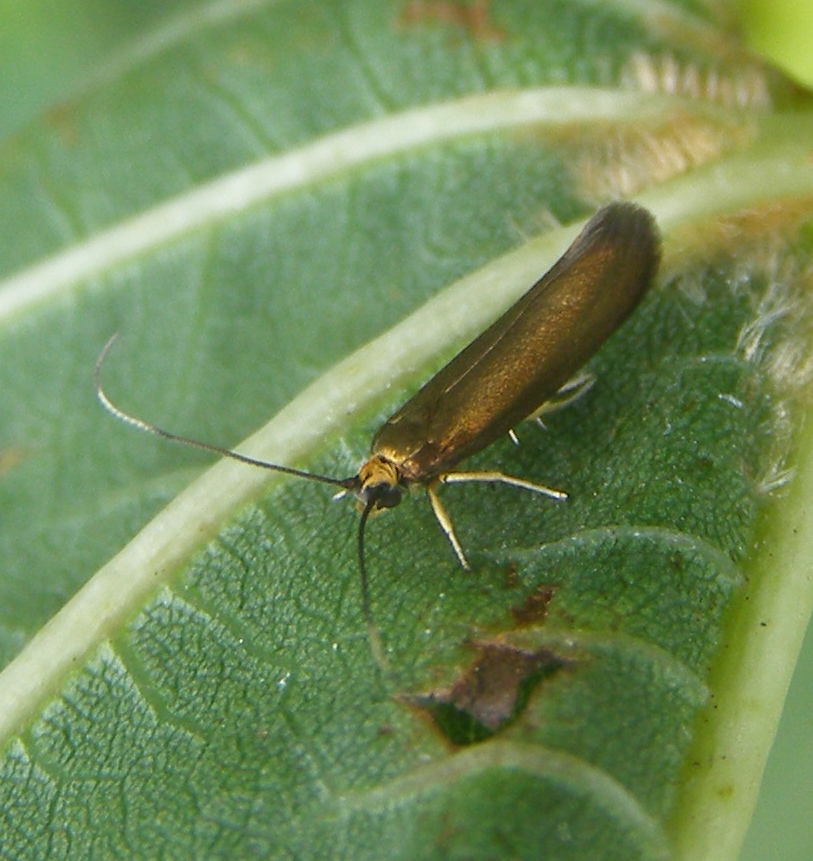
- Roeslerstammia erxlebella

Scientific classification
- Domain: Eukaryota
- Kingdom: Animalia
- Phylum: Arthropoda
- Class: Insecta
- Order: Lepidoptera
- Superfamily: Gracillarioidea
- Family: Roeslerstammiidae; Bruand, 1850

Genera
- See text

Diversity
- About 13 genera and 53 species

= Roeslerstammiidae =

Family of insects

Roeslerstammiidae is a family of insects in the order Lepidoptera. The family arose from the taxonomic uncertainty of the genus Roeslerstammia Zeller, 1839, which was assigned to different families. The genus Roeslerstammia was removed from the Yponomeutidae Stephens, 1829, and placed in the Amphitheridae Meyrick, 1913, which in consequence became a junior synonym of Roeslerstammiidae. Consequently, Roeslerstammiidae comprises the Palearctic genus Roeslerstammia, as well as the Oriental and Australasian genera that form part of the Amphitheridae.

== Genera ==
- Agriothera
- Amphithera
- Chalcoteuches
- Cuphomorpha
- Dasycarea
- Dinocrana
- Enchoptila
- Harpedonistis
- Hestiaula
- Macarangela
- Roeslerstammia
- Sphenograptis
- Thalassonympha
- Thereutis
- Vanicela
