= Synarthothelium =

Scientific classification
- Kingdom: Fungi
- Division: Ascomycota
- Class: Arthoniomycetes
- Order: Arthoniales
- Family: incertae sedis
- Genus: Synarthothelium; Sparrius (2009)

Type species
- Synarthothelium sipmanianum Sparrius (2009)

Species
- S. cerebriforme S. sipmanianum

Genus of lichens

Synarthothelium is a genus of lichen-forming fungi of uncertain familial placement in the order Arthoniales. It has two species of corticolous (bark-dwelling) crustose lichens that occur in tropical regions of the Americas.

== Taxonomy ==
The genus was circumscribed by the Dutch lichenologist Laurens Sparrius in 2009. Synarthothelium is distinguished from other genera in the Arthoniaceae by the presence of a thalline margin surrounding its reproductive structures (ascomata). While superficially resembling some members of the family Roccellaceae, such as Schismatomma and Mazosia, Synarthothelium differs in its ascus structure and larger spores. The asci are clavate (club-shaped) to globose (roughly spherical), similar to those found in Arthothelium (referred to as Arthothelium-type), and contain large ascospores.

The genus shares some characteristics with Cryptothecia and Stirtonia, which also have large spores and similar asci. However, these genera lack distinct ascomata and have different thallus structures. Synarthothelium can be further distinguished from Arthonia, Arthothelium, and Synarthonia based on various morphological features.

Another genus in the Arthoniaceae with a thalline margin is Amazonomyces, but it is strictly leaf-dwelling (foliicolous), has differently shaped spores, and produces abundant reproductive structures with very large conidia. The ascomata of Synarthothelium most closely resemble those of Arthothelium, but differ in having a thalline exciple, a carbonised excipulum, and non-muriform ascospores.

The genus Paradoxomyces, while sharing some features with Synarthothelium, lacks a thalline margin and is known only as a lichenicolous fungus (growing on other lichens) without its own visible thallus or associated algae.

Synarthothelium was originally classified tentatively in the family Arthoniaceae before being placed as incertae sedis (uncertain position) in the order Arthoniales in 2016, because of a lack of molecular sequence data.

== Habitat and distribution ==
The genus Synarthothelium is known from two species, both found in tropical regions of the Americas. These lichens are corticolous, meaning they grow on tree bark. Synarthothelium sipmanianum, the type species of the genus, has been recorded in Venezuela. It was discovered on Cerro Guaiquinima, a tepui in Bolívar State, at elevations between approximately 1000 and 1500 metres above sea level. The species was found growing on the base of Stegolepis plants and in forested areas along small streams.

Synarthothelium cerebriforme, the second known species in the genus, has been collected in Costa Rica. It was found in San Gerardo de Dota, a cloud forest located in San José Province, at an elevation of about 2800 metres. The specimen was collected from a sapling in a mixed, open Quercus (oak) forest on a steep slope.
