= Arthothelium hymeniicola =

Scientific classification
- Kingdom: Fungi
- Division: Ascomycota
- Class: Arthoniomycetes
- Order: Arthoniales
- Family: Arthoniaceae
- Genus: Arthothelium
- Species: A. hymeniicola

Binomial name
- Arthothelium hymeniicola Ertz & Fryday (2017)

Species of fungus

Arthothelium hymeniicola is a species of lichenicolous fungus (a fungus that grows on lichens) in the family Arthoniaceae. It lives entirely within the spore-producing layer of its host lichen's fruiting bodies, causing no visible damage to the host. The species is known only from Campbell Island in the New Zealand subantarctic.

== Taxonomy ==
Arthothelium hymeniicola was described as new to science in 2017 by Damien Ertz and Alan Fryday from material collected on Campbell Island, New Zealand, where it was found growing inside the fruiting bodies (apothecia) of an as-yet unidentified Bacidia species.

The species was assigned to the family Arthoniaceae and placed in Arthothelium in a provisional sense. This is because it does not develop its own fruiting bodies, and many of the characters normally used to separate genera and families in this group depend on ascomatal structure. The authors also discuss whether it could belong in the Cookellaceae (a group of dothideomycete fungi with superficially similar asci and spores), but note that the lack of molecular data and the absence of distinct ascomata make its placement uncertain for now.

== Description ==
This fungus is non-lichenised and forms no thallus of its own. Instead, it lives endohymenially: it develops within the hymenium (the spore-producing layer) of the host lichen's apothecia. The infection does not visibly deform or discolour the host fruiting bodies, so it may be undetectable without microscopy.

Microscopically, A. hymeniicola consists of loosely clustered, nearly spherical asci embedded mainly in the upper part of the host hymenium. The asci are 8-spored, about 35–40 × 24–30 μm, with a thickened upper wall (about 5 μm) and a small ocular chamber; in iodine tests the wall is I− but turns orange in Lugol's iodine (IKI). The ascospores are hyaline, ovoid to ellipsoid, and muriform (divided by several transverse septa plus a longitudinal septum), measuring 14–20 × 6–8 μm; they lack a distinct gelatinous sheath. Paraphysoids and conidiomata have not been observed.

== Habitat and distribution ==
Arthothelium hymeniicola is known only from its type collection on Campbell Island, from north of Beeman Station. It was collected on a branch in Dracophyllum scrub, where it was strictly confined to the hymenia of its Bacidia host. There are no confirmed records from elsewhere.
