= Synarthonia sikkimensis =

Scientific classification
- Kingdom: Fungi
- Division: Ascomycota
- Class: Arthoniomycetes
- Order: Arthoniales
- Family: incertae sedis
- Genus: Synarthonia
- Species: S. sikkimensis

Binomial name
- Synarthonia sikkimensis S.Joseph & G.P.Sinha (2015)
- Type locality: Sikkim, India

Species of lichen-forming fungus

Synarthonia sikkimensis is a species of corticolous (bark-dwelling) crustose lichen of uncertain familial classification in the order Arthoniales. Found in Sikkim, India, it was formally described as a new species in 2015. It is characterised by the sorediate thallus with a rhizomorph-like prothallus, a combination of features unique in the genus.

== Taxonomy ==
Synarthonia sikkimensis was described as new to science by Siljo Joseph and Gopal Prasad Sinha in 2015. The type was collected on bark in the Sikkim Himalaya (Lachung–Dombang, near Yakche) at 3,040 m elevation on 20 March 2012. The species was distinguished at publication by two features not previously recorded in Synarthonia: a sorediate thallus (a lichen body that produces powdery vegetative propagules called soredia) and a conspicuous, rhizomorph-like prothallus (a root-like marginal outgrowth); it also has larger spores than its closest look-alike, S. stigmatidialis. In the world key provided by the authors, S. sikkimensis is the only species with a sorediate thallus.

The genus itself is characterised by fruiting bodies that begin solitary and then merge into clustered synascomata (compound fruiting bodies sharing a single structure) embedded in a shallow pad of fungal tissue (a pseudostroma) with a thin white margin—patterns also seen in this species. A 2026 review of Synarthonia treated S. sikkimensis as one of about 25 recognized species in the genus. In discussing the separation of S. inconspicua, the authors used S. sikkimensis as a comparison taxon, distinguishing it by its sorediate thallus and I+ (reddish) hymenial reaction (a colour change in the spore-bearing layer when treated with iodine).

== Description ==
The thallus forms a thin, bark-adherent crust (about 100–180 μm thick), smooth to warted, with small pustules in the centre that break down into marginal soredia; calcium oxalate crystals are absent. The prothallus is rhizomorph-like and pale brownish where it contacts other lichens. The fertile structures develop as solitary, elongated to lirellate (slit-shaped) ascomata (spore-producing fruiting bodies) along the margins, but centrally they are gathered into slightly raised, multi-centred synascomata set in a pseudostroma with a thin white rim. The discs are usually dusted with a delicate white pruina (a fine, powdery bloom).

Internally, the epithecium (the thin layer capping the hymenium) is pale brownish. The hymenium (the spore-bearing layer) is clear and 50–80 μm tall, with an iodine staining reaction that is blue turning red (or red with blue streaks) and blue after KI pretreatment. The hypothecium (the tissue beneath the hymenium) is hyaline (translucent) to pale brownish, sometimes with brown inclusions, and shows similar iodine reactions. Asci (spore-bearing sacs) are 8-spored and of the Arthonia type; paraphysoids (slender, branched sterile filaments among the asci) are richly branched with slightly thickened, brown-tinged tips. Ascospores are hyaline, becoming brown and warty at maturity, 3–5-septate (divided by three to five cross-walls), and macrocephalic (the end cells are distinctly enlarged), mostly 19–23 μm long and 6.5–7.5 μm wide but occasionally reaching 25.7 × 8.6 μm. A very thin epispore (0.4–0.6 μm) is rarely present. The thallus gives negative results in standard spot tests (K−, C−, P−) and is UV−; no lichen substances were detected by thin-layer chromatography.

== Habitat and distribution ==
Synarthonia sikkimensis is a bark-dwelling lichen. It is confirmed from the Sikkim Himalaya, India, where the type was collected at 3,040 m elevation. A 2017 checklist of Sikkim microlichens included Synarthonia sikkimensis among the corticolous, crustose lichens recorded from North Sikkim, and marked the species as endemic.
