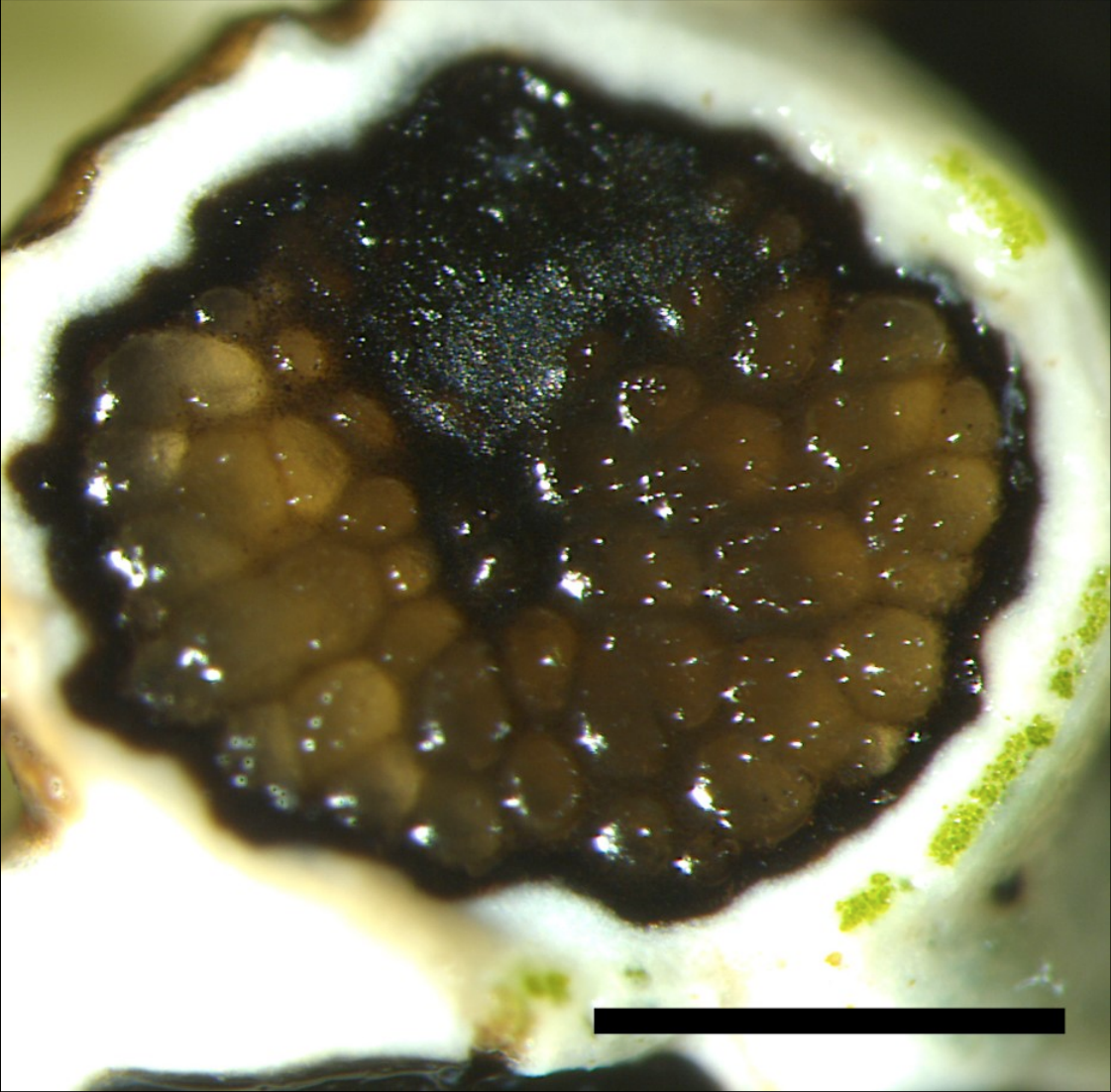
- Horizontal section of a gall soaked in water, showing perithecioid locules in fungal stroma. Scale = 0.5 mm.

Scientific classification
- Kingdom: Fungi
- Division: Ascomycota
- Class: Arthoniomycetes
- Order: Arthoniales
- Family: incertae sedis
- Genus: Perigrapha
- Species: P. superveniens

Binomial name
- Perigrapha superveniens (Nyl.) Hafellner (1996)

Synonyms
- Melanotheca superveniens Nyl. (1864); Metasphaeria superveniens (Nyl.) Sacc. & D.Sacc. (1905)

= Perigrapha superveniens =

Species of lichen

Perigrapha superveniens is a species of lichenicolous (lichen-dwelling) fungus of uncertain familial placement in the order Arthoniales. It is the type species of the genus Perigrapha. It uses members of the foliose lichen genus Parmelia as its host.

== Taxonomy ==
The fungus was first formally described in 1864 by the Finnish lichenologist William Nylander, who classified it in the genus Melanotheca. The type specimen was collected in France, where it was found growing on the thallus of Parmelia sulcata. Josef Hafellner transferred it to the genus Perigrapha in 1996.

== Description ==
Perigrapha superveniens is a species of lichenicolous fungus (a fungus that lives on lichens) that forms distinctive gall-like growths on its host lichen, primarily Parmelia sulcata. These galls appear as irregular, wavy outgrowths that are narrower at their base where they attach to the host lichen's surface. The fungus creates small, black, round to star-shaped discs on these galls, surrounded by a thick rim of host tissue.

Inside the galls, P. superveniens has a complex internal structure composed of fungal tissue (called stroma) containing numerous small chamber-like cavities (known as perithecioid locules). These chambers house the fungus's reproductive structures, including specialised cells called asci that produce spores. Each ascus typically contains 4–8 spores and measures 75–100 micrometres (μm) long by 12–16 μm wide.

The spores themselves have distinctive features: they are divided into four sections by three cross-walls (described as 3-septate), measure approximately 30–35 by 4.5–6 μm, and possess a clear outer coating (perispore). A unique characteristic of these spores is a thread-like appendage at one end. As the spores age, they develop a brownish colour and their surface becomes warty in texture. When treated with potassium hydroxide (KOH) solution, the brownish pigment in the upper layer of the fungal discs turns a dark reddish colour, which is useful for identification purposes. The species typically does not produce secondary reproductive structures called pycnidia.

Perigrapha superveniens appears to be an obligate parasite, meaning it can only survive by growing on its host lichen, primarily Parmelia sulcata, though it has also been reported on Parmelia squarrosa in Japan. Previous reports of the fungus growing on other lichen species have been determined to be misidentifications of different lichenicolous fungi.

== Habitat and distribution ==
Perigrapha superveniens shows a strong preference for humid, coastal forest environments. In Norway, where it was first reported in 2021, the species is found in the northern regions of Trøndelag and Nordland, particularly in areas characterised as boreal rainforest. It inhabits various forest types, including deciduous boreal forests, mixed forests dominated by Norway spruce (Picea abies) and deciduous trees, and open woodlands where Scots pine (Pinus sylvestris) and aspen (Populus tremula) are prevalent. The fungus has been found growing on its host lichen on various tree species, including aspen, rowan (Sorbus aucuparia), and goat willow (Salix caprea).

The species appears to be closely associated with highly oceanic environments, particularly occurring in the southern boreal vegetation zone in areas marked by significant oceanic influence. In Norway, it is often found alongside other moisture-loving lichenicolous fungi, including Arthophacopsis parmeliarum, Nesolechia oxyspora, and various Plectocarpon species.

Globally, P. superveniens has a scattered distribution across several continents, having been reported from:

- Europe (France, Ireland, Scotland, and Norway)
- North America (Newfoundland, Canada)
- Asia (Japan and the Caucasus region)
- Africa (South Africa)
- Atlantic islands (Madeira)

Despite its wide geographical range, the species appears to be relatively rare even within suitable habitats. For example, it was not detected during an extensive survey of Norwegian rainforest lichens, suggesting it may be genuinely scarce rather than simply overlooked, despite being relatively easy to spot in the field due to its distinctive appearance.
