= Wegea =

Scientific classification
- Kingdom: Fungi
- Division: Ascomycota
- Class: Arthoniomycetes
- Order: Arthoniales
- Family: incertae sedis
- Genus: Wegea; Aptroot & Tibell (1997)

Type species
- Wegea tylophorelloides Aptroot & Tibell (1997)

Genus of fungi

Wegea is a fungal genus in the order Arthoniales. It has not been placed into a family. It is a monospecific genus, containing the little-known single species Wegea tylophorelloides. The species has a morphology similar to calicioid fungi (a group characterized by their distinctive pin-like or club-shaped fruiting bodies) but does not form a powder spore mass (mazaedium). The genus, established in 1997, is known only from a single collection found growing on dead bark in the lowland rainforests of Papua New Guinea.

== Taxonomy ==
Wegea was established as a new genus in 1997 by André Aptroot and Leif Tibell to accommodate a distinctive calicioid fungus that could not be placed within any existing taxonomic groups. The genus is monotypic, containing only the single species W. tylophorelloides, which serves as both the type species and the defining representative of the genus. The genus name Wegea honours the prominent mycologist Walter Gams, recognizing his significant contributions to fungal taxonomy and systematics. The species epithet tylophorelloides reflects the morphological similarities between this fungus and members of the related genus Tylophorella, indicating their close evolutionary relationship while acknowledging the distinct differences that warrant separate generic status.

Taxonomically, Wegea is classified within the order Arthoniales, a diverse group of ascomycete fungi that includes both lichenized and non-lichenized species. Within this order, Wegea belongs to the calicioid fungi, a morphologically defined group characterized by their distinctive pin-like or club-shaped fruiting bodies. Despite sharing many structural features with other Arthoniales, Wegea represents one of the non-lichenized lineages within this predominantly lichen-forming order.

The closest relative to Wegea appears to be Tylophorella, particularly T. pyrenaica, based on similarities in ascus structure, spore development, and overall morphology. However, several key differences distinguish Wegea from Tylophorella: the absence of lichenization, the presence of distinctive pigmentation, shorter-stalked fruiting bodies, and spores that remain 3-septate throughout maturity rather than fragmenting into individual cells.

The type specimen of W. tylophorelloides was collected from the Finisterre Range foothills in Papua New Guinea's Madang Province, where it was found growing on the bark of a felled tree in lowland rainforest at roughly 230 metres elevation. This specimen, designated as holotype CBS 33330, is preserved in multiple herbaria and serves as the definitive reference for the species.

== Description ==
The fungus produces distinctive fruiting bodies (ascomata) that are short-stalked and measure 0.26–0.34 mm in height. These structures have a widened, subspherical top portion (capitulum) that appears greyish to reddish-brown with an uneven surface. The stalk itself is short, black, and smooth, measuring 0.12–0.14 mm in diameter. The lower portion of the stalk consists of strongly intertwined, translucent thread-like structures (hyphae) that are 5–8 micrometres (μm) in diameter, while the upper part contains irregularly distributed reddish pigment crystals.

A key diagnostic feature of Wegea is its distinctive spore ornamentation. The mature spores are dark brown with an elaborate surface pattern that is clearly visible under light microscopy. When examined with scanning electron microscopy, the spores reveal an intricate network of irregular ridges and depressions across their surface. The spores are 3-septate (divided by three cross-walls), measuring 12–18 × 4–6 μm, and have a slightly asymmetric, elongated shape.

The internal structure of the fruiting bodies includes strongly thickened asci (spore-containing sacs) at their tips, with a distinct layered chamber. Unlike many related fungi in the Arthoniales, Wegea lacks certain chemical reactions typical of the group and does not form a lichenized partnership with algae. The fungus also contains a reddish pigment that is not soluble in acetone.

Wegea shares several morphological features with the related genus Tylophorella, including the overall structure of its fruiting bodies and spore characteristics. However, it differs in being non-lichenized, having shorter-stalked fruiting bodies, containing distinctive pigmentation, and producing 3-septate spores that remain intact at maturity rather than fragmenting into individual cells as occurs in Tylophorella.

== Habitat and distribution ==
Wegea tylophorelloides is known only from its type locality in Papua New Guinea, where it was discovered in the Madang Province along the foothills of the Finisterre Range. The species inhabits lowland tropical rainforest environments at relatively low elevations, with the type collection made at about 230 meters above sea level.

The fungus appears to be a saprobic colonizer of dead wood, having been found growing on the bark of a recently felled tree in virgin rainforest. This suggests that W. tylophorelloides may play a role in the decomposition of woody plant material in these tropical ecosystems. The species was initially discovered during a lichenological expedition in 1992, and subsequent visits to the same locality in 1995 confirmed its presence on additional lichen-covered substrates, though no fruiting bodies were observed during the later collection. The habitat represents a corticolous (bark-dwelling) niche within the tropical rainforest ecosystem, growing in the high humidity and environmental conditions characteristic of lowland New Guinea forests. The specific microhabitat requirements and ecological preferences of W. tylophorelloides remain poorly understood due to the limited number of collections and observations.
