= Synarthonia xanthonica =

Scientific classification
- Kingdom: Fungi
- Division: Ascomycota
- Class: Arthoniomycetes
- Order: Arthoniales
- Genus: Synarthonia
- Species: S. xanthonica

Binomial name
- Synarthonia xanthonica Aptroot (2022)

Species of lichen

Synarthonia xanthonica is a species of crustose lichen in order Arthoniales, characterized by its UV-positive orange thallus and linear to ink spot-like ascomata (fruiting bodies). This lichen is corticolous, growing on the bark of trees in primary rainforests in Brazil.

== Taxonomy ==
Synarthonia xanthonica was described by André Aptroot in 2022 from specimens collected in the Cristalino nature reserve, Mato Grosso, Brazil. The species was identified as a novel member of the genus Synarthonia. The specific epithet, xanthonica, refers to the presence of xanthone compounds in the lichen, which contribute to the distinctive UV+ (orange) colouration of the thallus.

== Description ==
The thallus of Synarthonia xanthonica is crustose and continuous, lacking a cortex and featuring a dull, pale ochraceous-white colouration. It covers areas up to 3 cm in diameter and is under 0.1 mm thick, bordered by a dark brown prothallus line about 0.2 mm wide. The photobiont associated with this species is trentepohlioid (i.e., a member of the green algal genus Trentepohlia).

Ascomata (fruiting bodies) are solitary, superficial on the thallus, and present an irregularly linear to ink spot-like branched outline. They measure 0.3–0.8 mm in width and are under 0.05 mm high, with a dark grey, white pruinose disc. The margin of the ascomata is not differentiated. Ascospores are club-shaped (clavate), hyaline, and contain two septa; they measure 12–13.5 by 4.5–5.5 μm, and are not surrounded by a gelatinous sheath.

Chemical analysis revealed the presence of a xanthone, likely 1,8-dihydroxy-3,6-dimethoxyxanthone, contributing to the UV+ (orange) reaction of the thallus. Other chemical spot test reactions include C−, K−, KC−, and P−.

== Ecology and distribution ==
Synarthonia xanthonica is exclusively known to occur in its type locality within the primary rainforests of Mato Grosso, Brazil.
