= Bryostigma huriellae =

Scientific classification
- Kingdom: Fungi
- Division: Ascomycota
- Class: Arthoniomycetes
- Order: Arthoniales
- Family: incertae sedis
- Genus: Bryostigma
- Species: B. huriellae

Binomial name
- Bryostigma huriellae S.Y.Kondr. & J.-S.Hur (2020)

Species of lichen

Bryostigma huriellae is a species of lichenicolous (lichen-dwelling) fungus of uncertain familial placement in the order Arthoniales. Found in South Korea, it was formally described as a new species in 2020 by lichenologists Sergey Kondratyuk and Jae-Seoun Hur.

Bryostigma huriellae infects the thallus and apothecia of the crustose lichen Huriella pohangensis–it is this host that is referred to in the species epithet huriellae. The infection spots it forms on the host are highly inconspicuous, often only visible under 100x magnification or when examining sections of the host. These spots often display tiny, widely spaced ascomata or conidiomata. Over time, this fungus can be lethal to the host lichen.

The ascomata of Bryostigma huriellae ranges from 70 to 100 μm in diameter and is 50 to 70 μm thick when sectioned. These structures are mostly embedded deep within the host's thallus or reproductive parts, and typically group in small clusters of 1 to 3. Their colour is predominantly black but can exhibit a dark brown to blackish hue at the top and sides. When treated with a solution of potassium hydroxide (K), this colour turns a muted greyish-black, with the brown tint fading. The base of the exciple, however, remains clear. Paraphysoids in the fungus can reach up to 3 μm in diameter, and some might widen slightly at the tips to around 3–4 μm. They tend to curve above the asci tips. The asci measure between 20 and 24 by 12–15 μm. The ascospores, which turn slightly grey over time, are hyaline, 1-septate, and have dimensions of 9–13 by 3.5–5.5 μm. One cell of the ascospore is noticeably broader. In water, the epispore of these ascospores is barely discernible.

Bryostigma huriellae bears resemblance to both B. parietinarium and B. dokdoense. However, it distinguishes itself from these by producing much smaller infection spots and exhibiting unique microscopic features. Additionally, its host preference differs from those of the mentioned species.
