= Synarthonia leproidica =

Scientific classification
- Kingdom: Fungi
- Division: Ascomycota
- Class: Arthoniomycetes
- Order: Arthoniales
- Genus: Synarthonia
- Species: S. leproidica

Binomial name
- Synarthonia leproidica Ertz, Aptroot & Diederich (2020)

Species of lichen

Synarthonia leproidica is a species of saxicolous (rock-dwelling) and crustose lichen in the order Arthoniales. It is found in a few locations in Luxembourg where it grows on sheltered, relatively open siliceous rock outcrops near forest edges.

== Taxonomy ==
The lichen was formally described as a new species in 2020 by the lichenologists Damien Ertz, André Aptroot, and Paul Diederich. The type specimen was collected in the Vallée du Lellgerbaach (Lellingen) at an elevation of 323 m (1,060 ft). Here the lichen was found on a siliceous wall at the edge of a forest path in an oak-hornbeam forest. It has a pale greyish crust-like thallus with dark brown/violet tinges. It has a leproid growth form, meaning that it looks like it is made of granules; the specific epithet refers to this characteristic.

== Description ==
Synarthonia leproidica has a distinctive pale greyish crust-like thallus (the main body of the lichen) with a dark brown violaceous (purplish) tinge at the surface, forming patches typically 0.5–5 mm in diameter, though these can merge to cover areas up to 10 cm across. The thallus is leproid (powdery or granular in appearance) and can reach 1–2 mm in thickness. When damaged or abraded, thicker parts of the thallus reveal a greenish tinge inside.

The lichen produces small granules called soredia, measuring 14–38 μm in diameter, which contain photobiont cells (algal cells that form a symbiotic relationship with the fungus). These soredia consist of individual algal cells or short chains of cells surrounded by either hyaline (colourless and transparent) or dark brown hyphae (fungal filaments) about 2–3 μm in diameter. The photobiont partner is trentepohlioid (a type of green alga containing orange pigments), visible as individual globose cells 6–15 μm in diameter or in short chains of 2–4 cells, with individual algal cells measuring 13–20 by 9–16 μm. Ascomata (fungal fruiting bodies) and conidiomata (asexual reproductive structures) are unknown in this species.

When tested with chemical spot tests, the thallus is K−, C−, and Pd+ (bright orange-yellow). It does not fluoresce under ultraviolet light (UV−). Thin-layer chromatography reveals that it produces psoromic acid, a lichen secondary metabolite.

== Habitat and distribution ==
At the time of its original publication Synarthonia leproidica was known only from three localities in Luxembourg. All documented specimens have been collected from the Ardennes district, a distinctive region characterized by markedly siliceous rocks dating back to the Cambrian, Ordovician, and Lower Devonian periods. This area is predominantly covered by extensive forests.

The lichen inhabits sheltered siliceous schistose rock faces in relatively open conditions near forest edges. It typically grows on more or less vertical rock surfaces that are somewhat protected from direct rainfall. The specific collection sites include forest paths with small exposed rock outcrops, and in one case, a shaded rock face beneath the enclosure wall of a castle.

The associated lichen vegetation in these habitats is species-poor. Common companions include Psilolechia lucida (a bright yellow-green crustose lichen) and various species from the genus Lepraria (commonly known as dust lichens).
