= Arthothelium feuereri =

Scientific classification
- Kingdom: Fungi
- Division: Ascomycota
- Class: Arthoniomycetes
- Order: Arthoniales
- Family: Arthoniaceae
- Genus: Arthothelium
- Species: A. feuereri

Binomial name
- Arthothelium feuereri Aptroot & Seaward (2004)

Species of lichen

Arthothelium feuereri is a rare species of saxicolous (rock-dwelling) crustose lichen in the family Arthoniaceae. It forms a thin, pale-brown, varnish-like film on sun-blasted rock and bears scattered black fruit-bodies whose spores are densely divided into many chambers (muriform) and have conspicuously enlarged end-cells. The thallus contains gyrophoric acid—a secondary metabolite common in some lichens but previously unknown in saxicolous members of Arthothelium. The species is known only from its type locality on the summit of Les Trois Frères on Mahé, Seychelles.

== Taxonomy ==
Arthothelium feuereri was described by André Aptroot and Mark Seaward in 2004. The holotype specimen was gathered on 6 March 1994 by Tassilo Feuerer on bare granite at about 500 m elevation; the species epithet honours that collector. Among the six Arthothelium species that live on rock, A. feuereri is unique in having a smooth brown thallus—others in the genus all have a thick chalk-white crust. It also differs from corticolous relatives such as A. dictyosporum by the combination of densely muriform, macrocephalic spores and the presence of gyrophoric acid, the latter absent from those bark-dwelling taxa.

== Description ==
The thallus is thin (hardly more than a surface glaze), smooth and pale brown—likened by the authors to the colour of Acarospora fuscata—and lacks cracks or areoles. A narrow (about 1 mm) black hypothallus often outlines the lichen, creating an effigurate pattern against the rock. The embedded algae are minute green ellipsoids (probably Stichococcus).

Black, immarginate apothecia rest directly on the thallus surface (sessile) and are round to slightly irregular, 0.5–1.0 mm in diameter, with discs that become weakly convex. A dark-brown epihymenium reacts green when a drop of potassium hydroxide solution is applied, sitting above a clear hymenium roughly 200 micrometres (μm) tall. The colourless hypothecium is about 50 μm high. Paraphysoids—slender filaments that weave through the hymenium—are tightly anastomosed and only 1.5–2 μm thick. Asci are nearly spherical globose), 100–150 μm long and 80–125 μm wide, each containing four spores. The ascospores are hyaline to very pale brown, ellipsoid, densely muriform with 9–11 longitudinal and 7–12 transverse walls, and measure 40–50 × 20–25 μm; their enlarged terminal cells give the macrocephalic appearance. A thin gelatinous sheath (1–2 μm) surrounds each spore. No asexual reproductive structures (conidiomata) have been observed in this species.

== Habitat and distribution ==
The species is saxicolous, occurring on exposed granite on the summit ridge of Les Trois Frères, a low mountain on Mahé, the largest island of the Seychelles. There it shares the harsh, sun-baked rock surface with other unusual lichens such as Relicina abstrusa. Arthothelium feuereri has not been found on the coastal rocks that harbour most other rock-dwelling Arthothelium species worldwide, nor on bark where many others in the genus live. The single known population lies around 500 m elevation in a tropical environment, and, given the geological isolation of the inner Seychelles, the lichen may be a local endemic. It is the only member of the genus Arthothelium that has been recorded in the Seychelles Group.
