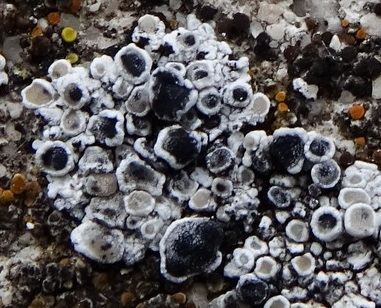
- Bryostigma apotheciorum

Scientific classification
- Kingdom: Fungi
- Division: Ascomycota
- Class: Arthoniomycetes
- Order: Arthoniales
- Family: incertae sedis
- Genus: Bryostigma; Poelt & Döbbeler (1979)

Type species
- Bryostigma leucodontis Poelt & Döbbeler (1979)

= Bryostigma =

Genus of lichens

Bryostigma is a genus of fungi of uncertain familial placement in the order Arthoniales. The genus is characterised by its thin, patchy growth that either partially embeds into its growing surface or forms an irregular, granular surface, with distinctive red or blue iodine staining of its hyphae and very small fruiting bodies. Most Bryostigma species are parasitic (lichenicolous), growing on other lichens, though a few species like B. lapidicola grow independently on stone or moss. While the genus was initially established with a single species growing on moss, it was significantly expanded in 2020 when several species were transferred from the related genus Arthonia based on DNA analysis, though this taxonomic reclassification has been subject to some scientific dispute. As of 2024, the genus includes seventeen species – thirteen parasitic and four independent lichen species.

== Taxonomy ==
The genus was circumscribed in 1979 by Josef Poelt and Peter Döbbeler, with the muscicolous lichen Bryostigma leucodontis assigned as the type species. A dozen Arthonia species were transferred into the genus in 2020 following molecular phylogenetic analysis of the family Arthoniaceae that showed distinct phylogenetic lineages that were basal to that family. The genus contains several parasitic species that occur on hosts having chlorococcoid photobionts (i.e., green algae that have a spherical shape). These taxonomic changes have been disputed, however; in the Revisions of British and Irish Lichens series, the authors note: "Work by Kondratyuk et al. (2020) included twelve new combinations into Bryostigma for these lichenicolous species, but added minimally to understanding of the clade and introduced several errors."

== Description ==
Bryostigma lichens have a thin, patchy thallus that is partially embedded in its substrate or has an irregular, granular surface. The primary photosynthetic partner (photobiont) in these lichens is a green alga with round cells, known as a chlorococcoid photobiont. The reproductive structures, called apothecia, are small, convex, and dark brown to black in colour, without a powdery coating (pruina).

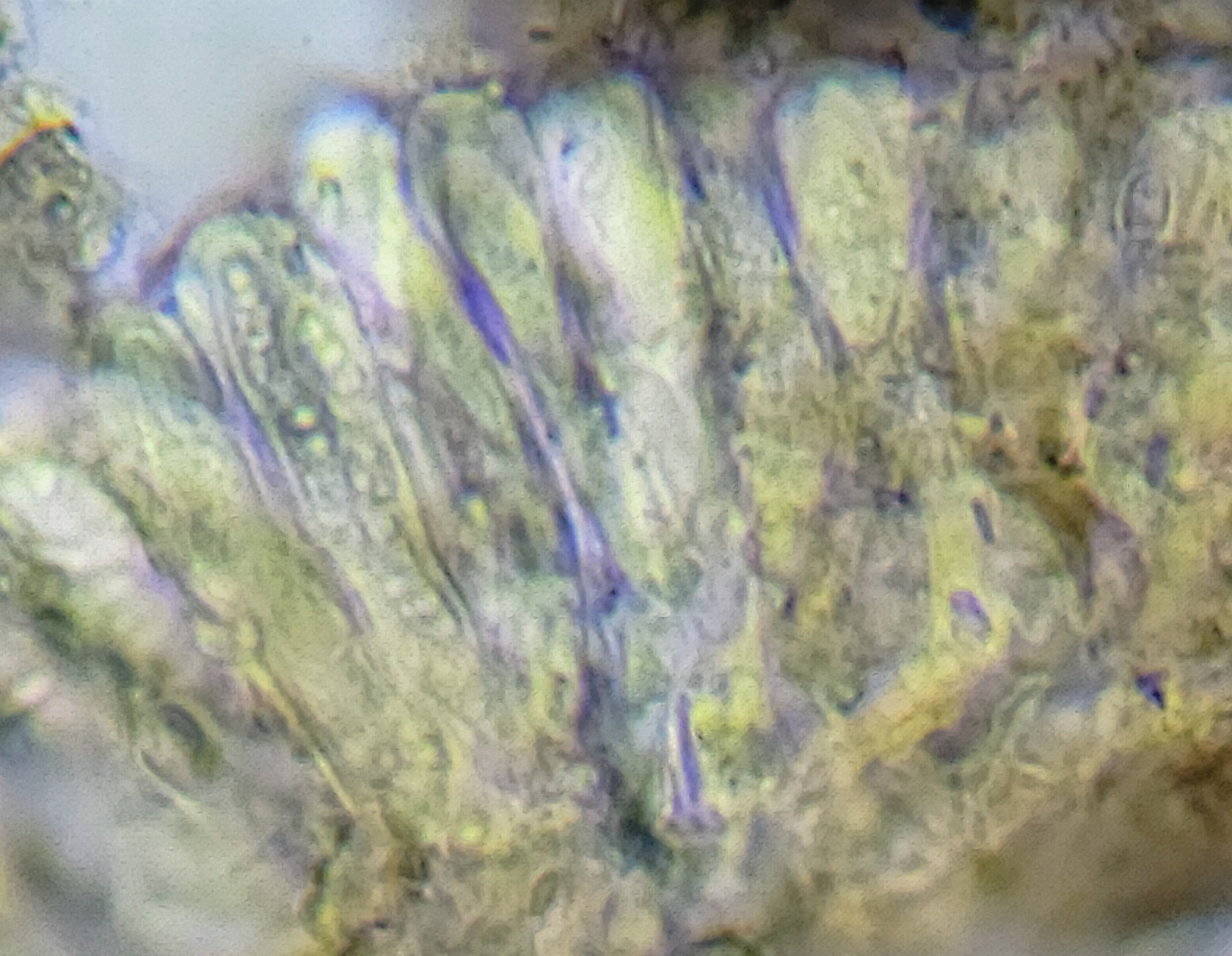
Hymenium of Bryostigma muscigenum, showing asci with ascospores

Under magnification, the upper layer of the apothecia (epithecium) appears pale green or reddish-brown and reacts to chemical spot tests (potassium hydroxide solution turns it green or olive-brown). The middle layer (hymenium) is either colourless or slightly green, while the base (hypothecium) is darker, sometimes reddish-brown, and reacts similarly to the epithecium with KOH. Thread-like structures called paraphysoids in the hymenium often have swollen tips with dark caps.

The asci, which are the sac-like structures that produce spores, are of the Arthonia-type, a specific structural form. The spores are two-celled, obovoid (egg-shaped, with the upper cell broader than the lower), and colourless. The genus also features small reproductive bodies called pycnidia, which are embedded in the thallus and have a reddish-brown outer wall. They release rod-shaped (bacilliform) conidia, a type of asexual spore. No secondary metabolites have been detected in this genus through thin-layer chromatography, a standard method for identifying lichen products.

== Species ==
As of December 2024, Species Fungorum (in the Catalogue of Life) accepts 15 species of Bryostigma. The 2024 Outline of Fungi includes 17 species in the genus. Hosts are indicated for lichicolous species.

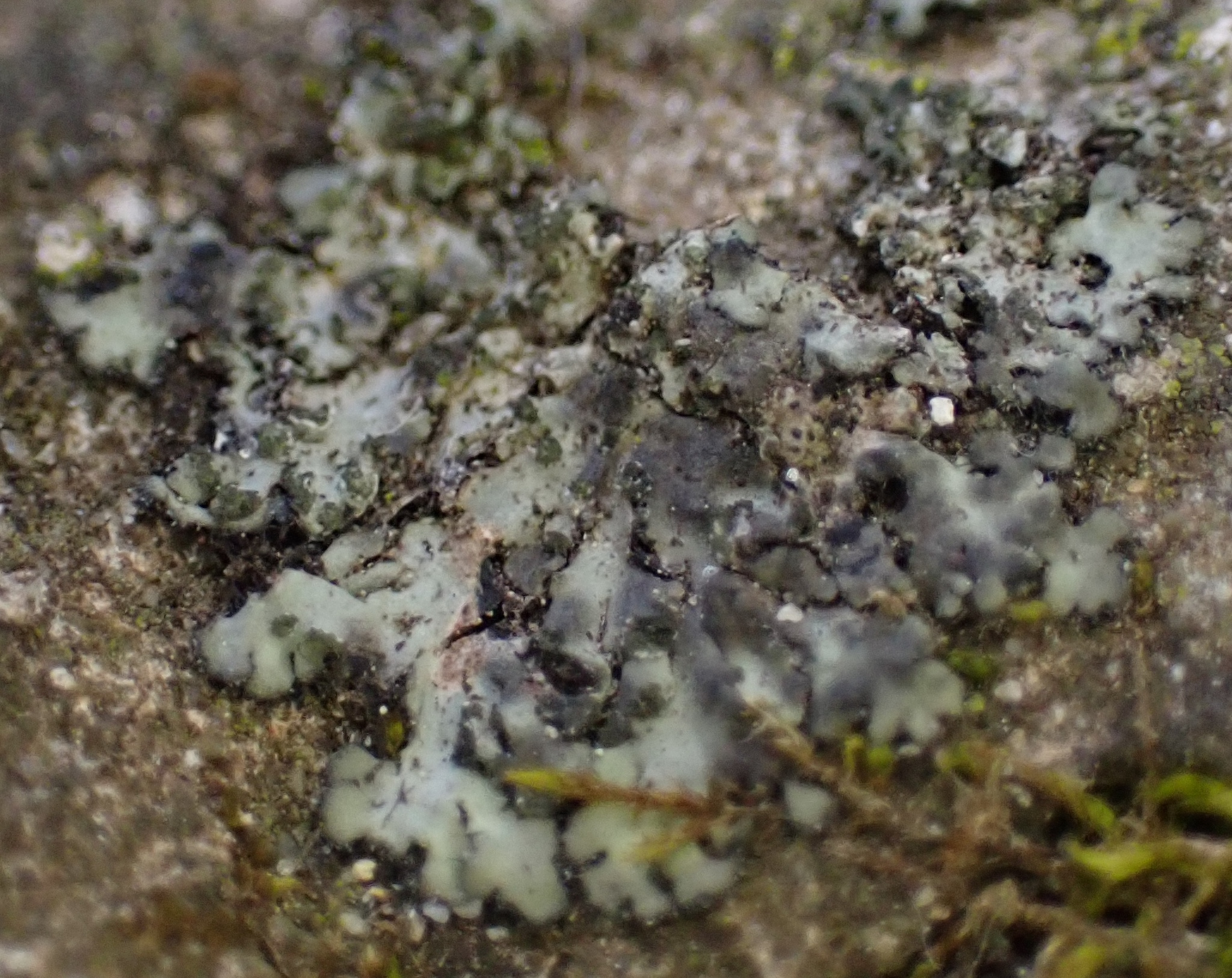
Bryostigma phaeophysciae (formerly in Arthonia) is parasitic on Phaeophyscia orbicularis.

- Bryostigma apotheciorum (A.Massal.) S.Y.Kondr. & Hur (2020) – host: Myriolecis albescens
- Bryostigma biatoricola (Ihlen & Owe-Larss.) S.Y.Kondr. & Hur (2020) – host: Biatora efflorescens
- Bryostigma dokdoense (S.Y.Kondr., Lőkös, B.G.Lee, J.J.Woo & Hur) S.Y.Kondr. & Hur (2020) – host: Orientophila
- Bryostigma epiphyscium (Nyl.) S.Y.Kondr. & Hur (2020) – host: Physcia
- Bryostigma excentricum (Th.Fr.) Etayo & Pino-Bodas (2023) – host: Lepraria and Leprocaulon
- Bryostigma huriellae S.Y.Kondr. & J.-S. Hur (2020) – South Korea; host: Huriella pohangensis
- Bryostigma lapalmae van den Boom & Ertz (2021)
- Bryostigma lapidicola (Taylor) S.Y.Kondr. & Hur (2020)
- Bryostigma lobariellae (Etayo) S.Y.Kondr. & Hur (2020) – host: Lobariella
- Bryostigma molendoi (Heufl. ex Arnold) S.Y.Kondr. & Hur (2020) – host: Caloplaca and Xanthoria
- Bryostigma muscigenum (Th.Fr.) Frisch & G.Thor (2014)
- Bryostigma neglectulum (Nyl.) S.Y.Kondr. & Hur (2020) – host: Lepraria neglecta?
- Bryostigma parietinarium (Hafellner & Fleischhacker) S.Y.Kondr. & Hur (2020) – host: Xanthoria parietina
- Bryostigma peltigerinum (Almq.) S.Y.Kondr. & Hur (2020) – host: Peltigera and Solorina
- Bryostigma phaeophysciae (Grube & Matzer) S.Y.Kondr. & Hur (2020) – host: Phaeophyscia orbicularis
- Bryostigma stereocaulinum (Ohlert) S.Y.Kondr. & Hur (2020) – host: Stereocaulon
