= Sterile fungi =

Form group of fungi that do not produce any spores

The sterile fungi, or mycelia sterilia, are a group of fungi that do not produce any known spores, either sexual or asexual. This is considered a form group, not a taxonomic division, and is used as a matter of convenience only, as various isolates within such morphotypes could include distantly related taxa or different morphotypes of the same species, leading to incorrect identifications. Because these fungi do not produce spores, it is impossible to use traditional methods of morphological comparison to classify them. However, molecular techniques can be applied to determine their evolutionary history, with ITS testing being the preferred method. Several lichen genera include sterile species: Andreiomyces, Aspicilia Buellia, Calvatimella, Chrysothrix, Lepraria, Megalaria and Phlyctis. According to one study, approximately 42% of fluids collected from broncho-alveolar lavage have had sterile mycelium observed in them.
