= Bryostigma epiphyscium =

Scientific classification
- Domain: Eukaryota
- Kingdom: Fungi
- Division: Ascomycota
- Class: Arthoniomycetes
- Order: Arthoniales
- Genus: Bryostigma
- Species: B. epiphyscium

Binomial name
- Bryostigma epiphyscium (Nyl.) S.Y.Kondr. & Hur (2020)

Synonyms
- Conida epiphyscia (Nyl.) Zopf (1896); Arthonia epiphyscia Nyl. (1875)

Species of lichen

Bryostigma epiphyscium is a species of lichenicolous fungus in the order Arthoniales. Formerly classified in the genera Arthonia and Conida, it was transferred to the genus Bryostigma in 2020.

It is known to infect the lichen Physcia caesia and other lichens of the genus Physcia.
