= Synarthonia bicolor =

Scientific classification
- Kingdom: Fungi
- Division: Ascomycota
- Class: Arthoniomycetes
- Order: Arthoniales
- Family: incertae sedis
- Genus: Synarthonia
- Species: S. bicolor

Binomial name
- Synarthonia bicolor Müll.Arg. (1891)

Synonyms
- Synarthoniomyces bicoloris Cif. & Tomas. (1953); Arthonia translucens Stirt. (1881); Arthonia subcaesia C.W.Dodge (1953)

Species of lichen

Synarthonia bicolor is a species of corticolous (bark-dwelling) crustose lichen of uncertain familial classification in the order Arthoniales. This tropical lichen forms thin, whitish-grey crusts on tree bark and is distinguished by its fruiting bodies that start as single structures but later cluster together into compound formations surrounded by white margins. It is chemically unique within its genus due to the presence of lichexanthone, a lichen product that causes the thallus to glow bright yellow under ultraviolet light. The species has a disjunct distribution, being known from Costa Rica where it was originally described and from mangrove forests in the Sundarbans region of India.

== Taxonomy ==
Synarthonia bicolor was described by Johannes Müller Argoviensis in 1891 from material collected by Henri François Pittier near San José, Costa Rica. The species belongs to a genus characterised by ascomata that start out solitary and later aggregate into clusters (synascomata) embedded in a slightly raised to immersed pseudostroma (a stroma-like pad of fungal tissue) with a thin white margin; this developmental pattern is well documented in S. bicolor. Within Synarthonia, S. bicolor is set apart chemically and microscopically: its thallus contains lichexanthone and the hymenium reacts iodine-positive red.

== Description ==
The thallus forms a thin, closely adherent crust on bark, white to whitish grey (sometimes with yellowish to brownish patches), with a narrow dark brown border line; calcium oxalate crystals are absent. Young fruiting bodies (ascomata) start out single with a well-developed white rim, but they soon begin clustering together: around the edges of a colony they form small groups of 1–3 fruiting bodies ("mono-carpocentral clusters"), while in the center they merge into larger compound structures that can contain many fruiting bodies fused together ("pluricarpocentral synascomata"). Discs are usually epruinose (without a powdery bloom), only rarely thinly pruinose.

Internal anatomy is typical for the genus: the excipulum is hyaline to pale brownish; the epithecium is brownish to greyish with some gelatinous material and crystals; the hymenium is clear and iodine-positive directly red (turning blue with KI); paraphysoids are richly branched with slightly thickened brownish tips; and the hypothecium is hyaline to pale yellowish and also I+.

Ascospores are hyaline, becoming pale brownish when mature, macrocephalic (the end cells noticeably larger), and (3–)4–5-septate, measuring about 20–24 × 7–8.5 μm (old spores often appear slightly warty or shrivelled; an epispore was not seen). In terms of spot test reactions, thallus is K−, C−, and P−, but glows bright yellow under long-wave ultraviolet owing to lichexanthone; within the genus, S. bicolor is the only species with this UV-positive yellow thallus linked to lichexanthone.

== Habitat and distribution ==
The species is bark-dwelling (corticolous). Beyond the type locality in Costa Rica (San José), it has been confirmed from the Sundarbans region of West Bengal, India, where it grows on the mangrove tree Excoecaria agallocha. These Indian records document multiple collections from the Sundarbans Biosphere Reserve and nearby localities.
