= Tarbertia =

Scientific classification
- Kingdom: Fungi
- Division: Ascomycota
- Class: Arthoniomycetes
- Order: Arthoniales
- Family: incertae sedis
- Genus: Tarbertia; Dennis (1974)

Type species
- Tarbertia juncina Dennis (1974)

Genus of fungi

Tarbertia is a single-species fungal genus in the order Arthoniales. The genus has not been placed into a family. This monotypic genus contains the species Tarbertia juncina.

== Taxonomy ==
Both the genus and species were described as new to science in 1974 by the English mycologist Richard Dennis. The type specimen was collected from the Outer Hebrides in 1972. According to Dennis, Margaret Elizabeth Barr Bigelow suggested to him that the fungus might belong in the family Arthoniaceae, because of similarities to Arthothelium, a genus of bark-dwelling, lichen-forming fungi. Although Tarbertia juncina is not lichenised, it does grow on the culm of Juncus (a genus in the rush family).

== Description ==
The dark brown ascoma of the fungus forms a layer between 7 and 10 μm thick and extending four to five cells deep. After the external layer sloughs off, it exposes a margin with black lobes and yellow ascus-forming tissue, ultimately resembling a tiny species of Coccomyces. The ascospores are oblong with three transverse septa, and measure 11–12 by 6 μm.
