= Synarthonia psoromica =

Scientific classification
- Kingdom: Fungi
- Division: Ascomycota
- Class: Arthoniomycetes
- Order: Arthoniales
- Family: incertae sedis
- Genus: Synarthonia
- Species: S. psoromica

Binomial name
- Synarthonia psoromica S.Joseph & G.P.Sinha (2015)

Species of lichen-forming fungus

Synarthonia psoromica is a species of corticolous (bark-dwelling) lichen of uncertain familial classification in the order Arthoniales. Found in the Nilgiri Mountains of Tamil Nadu, India, it was formally described as a new species in 2015 by Siljo Joseph and Gopal Prasad Sinha. It was described as a distinct species on the basis of its immersed synascomata (clusters of fruiting bodies) and the detection of psoromic acid in the thallus.

== Taxonomy ==
Synarthonia psoromica was described as new to science by Siljo Joseph and Gopal Prasad Sinha in 2015. The type material was collected in Armbi Forest in the Nilgiri Mountains of Tamil Nadu, India, where it was gathered from bark at 2,410 m elevation on 6 December 2012.

In their original diagnosis, Joseph and Sinha distinguished the species from other Synarthonia taxa by a combination of characters rather than by any single feature. They cited the immersed clusters ("synascomata", which are tight clusters of ascomata that function together) set in a slightly sunken pseudostroma (a pad of fungal tissue); the ascospores typically have three septa; and the thallus contains the lichen substance psoromic acid, detected by thin-layer chromatography.

== Description ==
The species forms a thin, whitish crust on bark about 100 μm thick. Its surface is cracked into a rimose pattern, and no observed calcium oxalate crystals were observed. A pale brown, fibrous prothallus borders the thallus, and the photobiont cells measure 11–16 × 9–14 μm. The fruiting bodies are grouped into slightly sunken patches of fungal tissue, or pseudostroma, that contain clustered synascomata. These clusters are often separated from the surrounding thallus by a narrow slit, and the individual ascomata are rounded to somewhat elongate, with faint to inconspicuous margins and discs lightly dusted with white pruina.

Microscopically, the ascomata have a pale excipulum and a pale-brown epithecium containing light-coloured crystals. The hymenium is clear and 40–70 μm high, reacting I+ (red) and KI+ (pale blue), while the hypothecium is colourless to pale yellowish, contains some brownish hyphal inclusions, and reacts I+ (blue) and KI+ (deep blue). The paraphysoids are densely branched and interconnected, and the eight-spored asci are of the Arthonia type. The ascospores are hyaline when young, becoming brownish at maturity. They are usually 3-septate but sometimes 2-septate, have an enlarged terminal cell, and measure 12.5–15.8 × 4.0–5.5 μm. Spot tests are K−, C−, P+ (yellow), and UV−, and thin-layer chromatography detected psoromic acid.

== Habitat and distribution ==
Synarthonia psoromica is known from the Nilgiri Hills of Tamil Nadu in southern India, where it grows on bark at high elevation. The type specimen was collected in Armbi Forest at 2,410 m on the bark of Myrsine wightiana.
