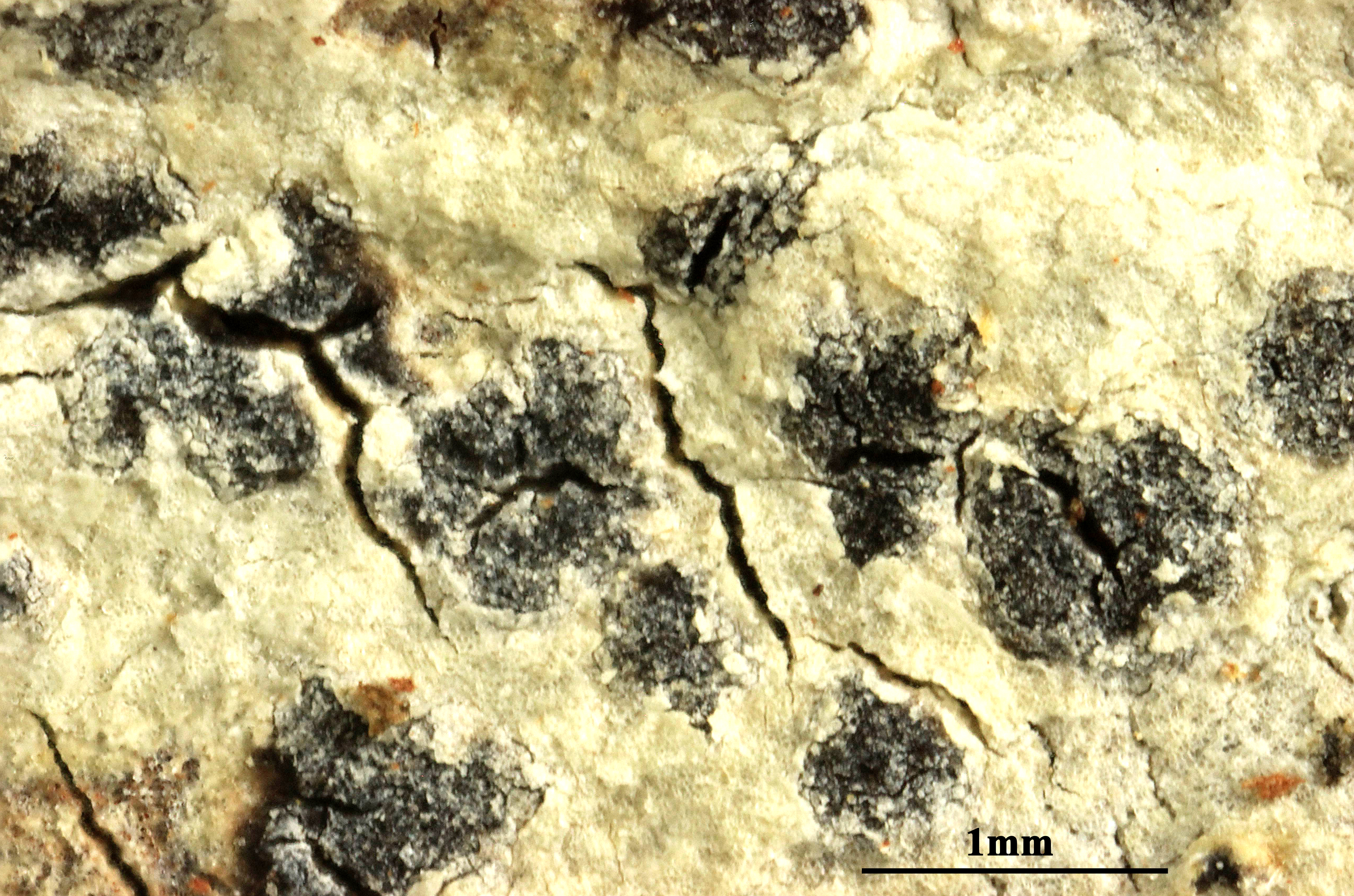

Scientific classification
- Kingdom: Fungi
- Division: Ascomycota
- Class: Arthoniomycetes
- Order: Arthoniales
- Family: Arthoniaceae
- Genus: Arthothelium
- Species: A. spectabile

Binomial name
- Arthothelium spectabile A.Massal. (1852)

Synonyms
- Arthonia spectabilis Flot. (1831); Arthonia spectabilis (A.Massal.) Anzi (1860)

= Arthothelium spectabile =

Species of lichen-forming fungus

Arthothelium spectabile is a species of corticolous (bark-dwelling) crustose lichen in the family Arthoniaceae.

== Taxonomy ==
Arthothelium spectabile was described as a new species by the Italian lichenologist Abramo Bartolommeo Massalongo in 1852. In the protologue, Massalongo reported it from tree trunks across Europe and said it was common in the Verona region (northern Italy), especially on hazel (Corylus avellana) near Bolca (Val Cherpa); he also linked it to earlier usage under names in Opegrapha and Arthonia.

== Description ==
The thallus of Arthothelium spectabile is mostly immersed in the surface of its substrate and appears as creamy-white to grey-white patches. It is often edged by a thin brown boundary line (a prothallus) that helps define the extent of the thallus. The photosynthetic partner is a trentepohlioid alga.

Its fruiting bodies (apothecia) are black and lack a powdery coating (they are not pruinose). They are typically rounded to irregular in outline, sometimes becoming angular (polygonal), and may be either circular (up to about 1.2 mm across) or somewhat elongated (to about 2 mm long). In section the apothecia are about 120–150 micrometres (μm) tall. The upper surface layer (epithecium) is red-brown and turns a deeper reddish colour in potassium hydroxide solution (K+). The spore-bearing layer (hymenium) and the underlying tissue (hypothecium) are pale reddish-brown, showing at most a faint greenish reaction in K. Numerous fine paraphysoids (about 0.5–1 μm thick) run through the hymenium; their tips are usually unpigmented and do not form swollen caps. The ascospores measure 26–36 × 12–15 μm and are ellipsoid to somewhat cylindrical-ellipsoid. They are muriform, with 5–7 cross-walls, and most of the compartments are further divided by 1–3 longitudinal septa.
