= Perigrapha =

Perigrapha may refer to:

- Perigrapha (fungus), a genus of fungi in the order Arthoniales
- Perigrapha (moth), a genus of moths in the family Noctuidae
