= Glyphopsis =

Scientific classification
- Kingdom: Fungi
- Division: Ascomycota
- Class: Arthoniomycetes
- Order: Arthoniales
- Family: incertae sedis
- Genus: Glyphopsis; Aptroot (2014)
- Species: G. aurantiodisca

Binomial name
- Glyphopsis aurantiodisca Aptroot (2014)

Genus of lichens

Glyphopsis is a fungal genus of uncertain familial placement in the order Arthoniales. It contains the single species Glyphopsis aurantiodisca, a bark-dwelling crustose lichen found in New Caledonia. Both the genus and species were described as new to science in 2014 by the Dutch lichenologist André Aptroot.

== Description ==
Glyphopsis aurantiodisca has a crustose (crust-like) thallus, which is white and adheres closely to the bark of trees. The thallus is thin, cracked, and lacks a protective outer layer (cortex), giving it a dull appearance. It often contains hyaline (colourless) crystals that can fall out, leaving angular holes in the surface. The internal tissue (medulla) is white, and no prothallus (a distinct boundary layer) is present. The lichen hosts trentepohlioid algae, a type of green algae that forms a symbiotic relationship with the fungus.

The ascomata (fruiting bodies) are sessile (directly attached to the substrate without a stalk) and have a broad base. These structures are typically round to irregularly shaped, sometimes branching slightly, and are often grouped together in stroma-like (supportive tissue) formations. The ascomata measure between 0.5 and 1.4 mm in diameter and feature a bright orange, pruinose (powdery) disc that is exposed. The margins of the ascomata are raised above the disc and are of the same white colour as the thallus, measuring around 0.2 mm wide.

The outer layer of the ascomata (excipulum) is hyaline and contains large, angular crystals, with the hyphae (fungal filaments) also incrusted with small hyaline crystals. The underlying tissue (hypothecium) is yellowish and measures about 100–155 μm in height. The surrounding tissue (parathecium) is thin and contains orange pigment, while the internal tissue (hamathecium) is not filled with granular material (inspersed) but shows streaks of orange pigment and contains filaments that intertwine (anastomose).

The asci, which are spore-producing sacs, are broadly clavate (club-shaped) and contain eight ascospores each. These ascospores are hyaline, somewhat clavate in shape, and typically have 5 to 7 transverse septa (dividing partitions) with 1 to 4 longitudinal septa. They measure 18–21 by 7–8.5 μm.

Chemically, the thallus reacts to ultraviolet light with a white fluorescence and contains divaricatic acid and zeorin, two lichen products identified through thin-layer chromatography (TLC). The ascomata also contain two anthraquinones, pigments responsible for the bright orange colour, although these compounds do not appear on TLC tests.

== Habitat and distribution ==
Glyphopsis aurantiodisca is found exclusively in New Caledonia, where it inhabits the bark of trees in scrub forests. The species has been recorded from the Plaine des Lacs region, specifically along the Rivière des Lacs at an elevation of about 250 m (820 ft). At the time of its original publication, this lichen was known to occur only from this location, making it endemic to the New Caledonia region.
