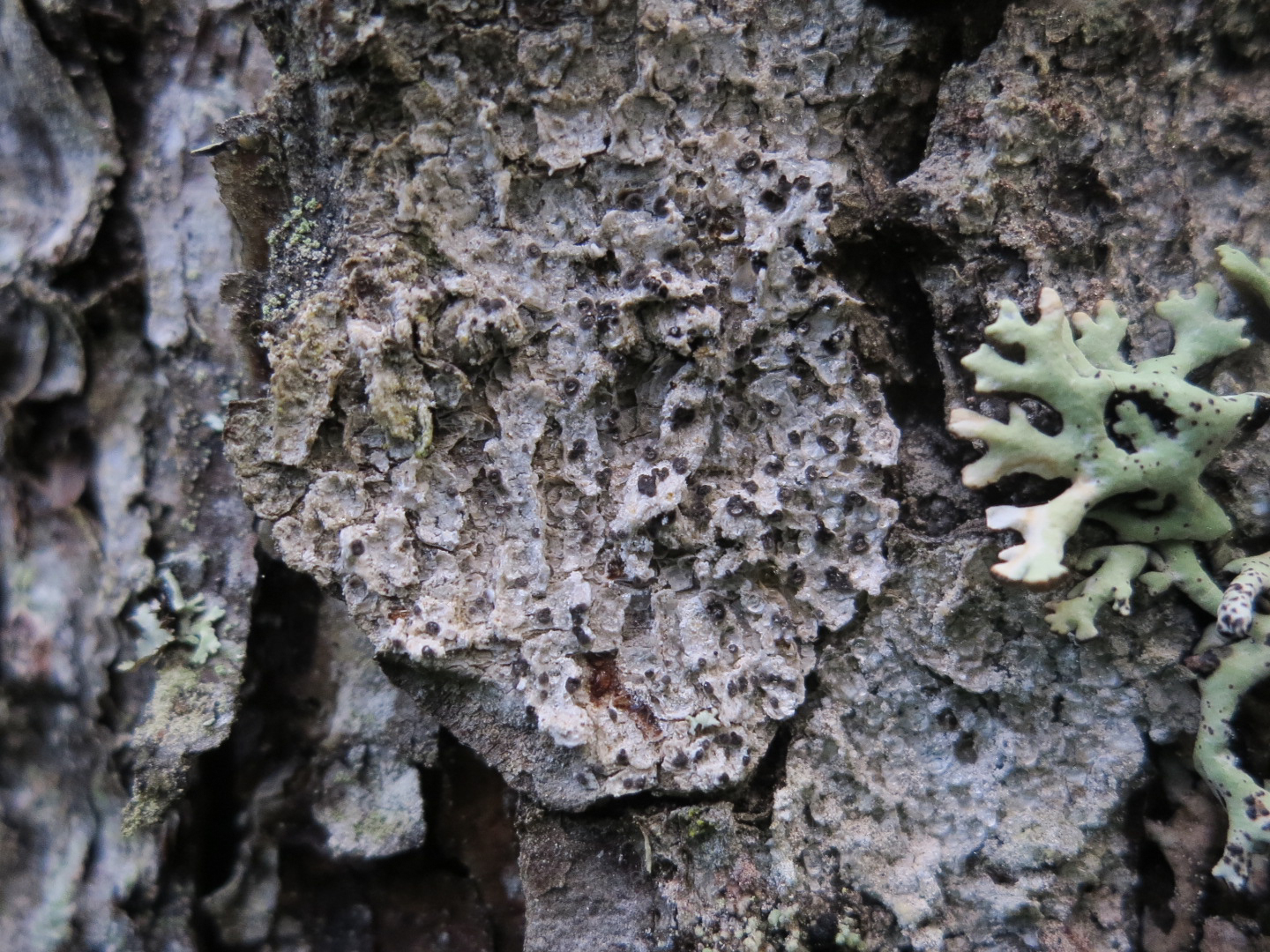
- Felipes leucopellaeus

Scientific classification
- Domain: Eukaryota
- Kingdom: Fungi
- Division: Ascomycota
- Class: Arthoniomycetes
- Order: Arthoniales
- Genus: Felipes; Frisch & G.Thor, 2014
- Species: F. leucopellaeus

Binomial name
- Felipes leucopellaeus (Ach.) Frisch & G.Thor, 2014

Synonyms
- Arthonia leucopellaea (Ach.); Arthonia leucopellaea (Ach.) Almq. Spiloma melaleucum var. leucopellaeum (Ach.)

= Felipes =

Genus of lichen

Felipes is a genus of lichenized fungi in the order Arthoniales. Circumscribed by Andreas Frisch and Göran Thor in 2014, it contains the single species Felipes leucopellaeus. Genetic analysis shows that the genus falls into the order Arthoniales, but its familial placement is uncertain. Felipes leucopellaeus is found across Europe and North America in temperate and boreal regions, typically in old-growth forest or wooded mires. It is crustose and corticolous.

== Systematics ==
Felipes leucopellaeus was first described in 1810 by Erik Acharius, who named it Spiloma melaleucum var. leucopellaeum. He later moved it to the genus Arthonia as Arthonia leucopellaea, where most taxonomists listed it for nearly two centuries. However, in 2014, Andreas Frisch and Göran Thor moved it to the monotypic genus Felipes. The genus name is Latin for "cat's paw", a reference to the shape of its ascomata (fruiting structures).

== Description ==
Felipes leucopellaeus is a crustose lichen. Its thallus is whitish to pale yellow or fawn in colour, variously described as being flaky (scurfy), minutely granular (leprose) or somewhat "cobwebby" (arachnoid) in appearance. Fresh growth often has a pinkish tinge, and the lichen has no distinct margin. Its apothecia (the lichen's spore-carrying structures) are dark brown to black in colour, ranging in shape from generally rounded to star-like or lobed.

== Ecology ==
Felipes leucopellaeus is a corticolous lichen, growing on tree bark – particularly acidic tree bark. In Europe, it is found on the bark of mature birch (Betula), oak (Quercus), pine (Pinus) and holly (Ilex) trees, as well as occasionally on old common heather (Calluna) stems. In North America, where it was first recorded in 1988, it has been found on the bark of Betula alleghaniensis (yellow birch) and Picea rubens (red spruce).

It is uncommon in many of the places it occurs. In Italy, it is considered critically endangered, and it is a red-listed species in Poland and Lithuania. It is sometimes attacked by the lichenicolous species Chaenothecopsis vainioana.

== Citations ==
=== References cited ===
- Acharius, Erik (1810). Lichenographia universalis. Gottingae: I.F. Danckwerts.
- "Felipes". Catalogue of Life.
- "Felipes leucopellaeus (Ach.) Frisch & G. Thor". National Biodiversity Network.
- Frisch, Andreas; Thor, Göran; Ertz, Damien; Grube, Martin (August 2014). "The Arthonialean challenge: Restructuring Arthoniaceae". Taxon. 63 (4): 727–744. doi:10.12705/634.20. JSTOR taxon.63.4.727.
- Gowan, Sharon P.; Brodo, Irwin M. (Winter 1988). "The Lichens of Fundy National Park, New Brunswick, Canada". The Bryologist. 91 (4): 255–325. doi:10.2307/3242770. JSTOR 3242770.
- Motiejûnaitë, Jurga; Alstrup, Vagn; Randlane, Tiina; Himelbrant, Dmitry; Stonèius, Darius; Hermansson, Janolof; Urbanavichus, Gennadij; Suija, Ave; Fritz, Örjan; Lukođienë, Ingrida Prigodina; Johansson, Per (2008). "New or noteworthy lichens, lichenicolous and allied fungi from Birþai district, Lithuania". Botanica Lithuanica. 14 (1): 29–42.
- Nimis, Pier Luigi (2022). "Felipes leucopellaeus (Ach.) Frisch & G. Thor". ITALIC - The Information System on Italian Lichens. 7.0. University of Trieste, Department of Biology.
- Smith, C. W.; Aptroot, A.; Coppins, B. J.; Fletcher, A.; Gilbert, O. L.; James, P. W.; Wolseley, P. A., eds. (2009). The Lichens of Great Britain and Ireland. London: The British Lichen Society. ISBN 978-0-9540418-8-5.
