= Catarraphia =

Scientific classification
- Kingdom: Fungi
- Division: Ascomycota
- Class: Arthoniomycetes
- Order: Arthoniales
- Family: incertae sedis
- Genus: Catarraphia; A.Massal. (1860)

Type species
- Catarraphia dictyoplaca (Mont. & Bosch) A.Massal. (1860)

Genus of fungi

Catarraphia is a genus of fungi within the order Arthoniales. The genus has not been placed into a family. This is a monotypic genus, containing the single species Catarraphia dictyoplaca.
