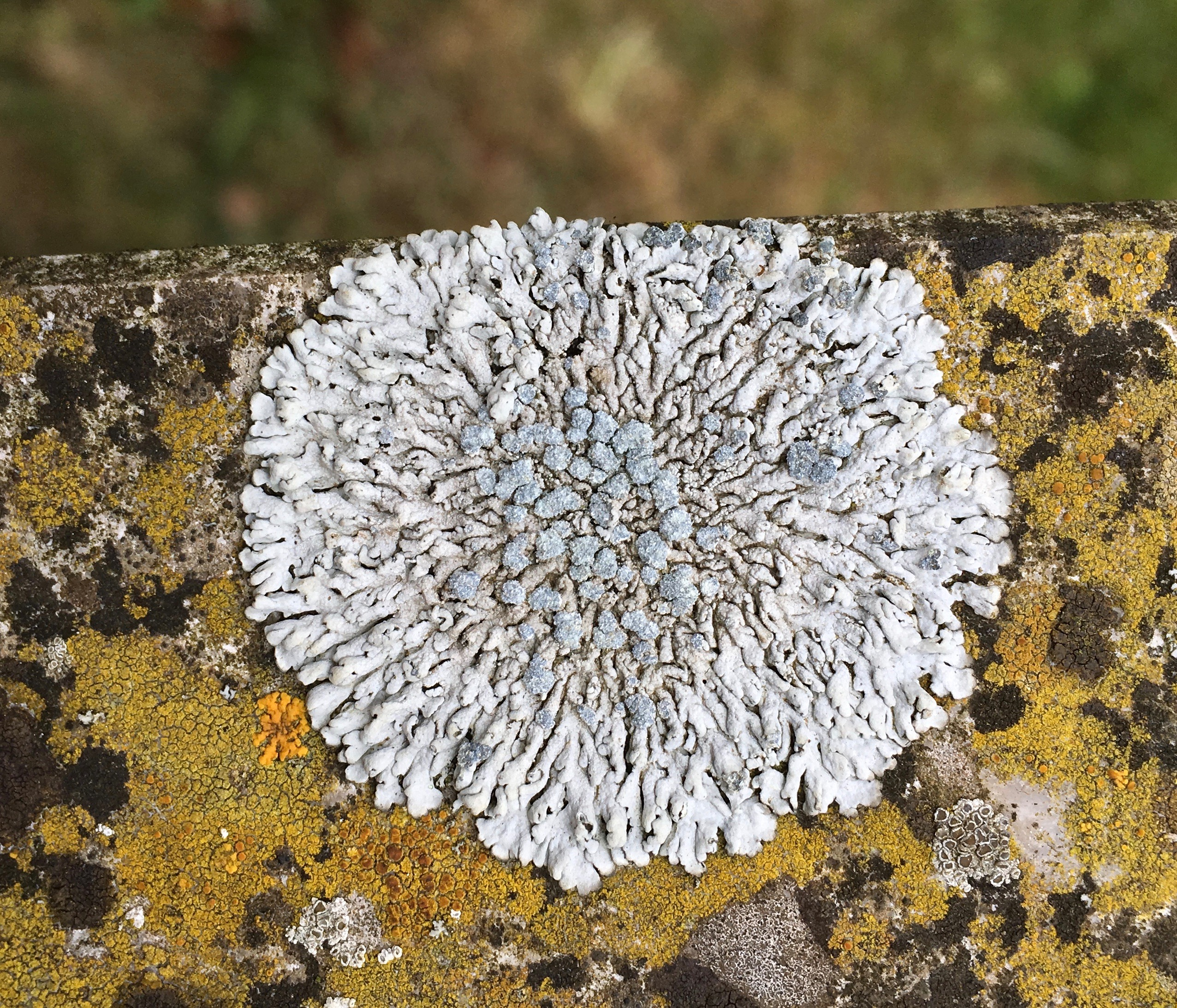

Conservation status
- Secure (NatureServe)

Scientific classification
- Kingdom: Fungi
- Division: Ascomycota
- Class: Lecanoromycetes
- Order: Caliciales
- Family: Physciaceae
- Genus: Physcia
- Species: P. caesia

Binomial name
- Physcia caesia (Hoffm.) Fürnr., 1839

Subspecies
- Physcia caesia caesia Physcia caesia ventosa

Synonyms
- Borrera caesia (Hoffm.) Mudd, 1861; Dimelaena caesia (Hoffm.) Norman, 1853; Hagenia caesia (Hoffm.) Bagl. and Carestia, 1865; Imbricaria caesia (Hoffm.) DC, 1805; Lichen caesius Hoffm., 1784; Lobaria caesia (Hoffm.) Hoffm., 1790; Parmelia caesia (Hoffm.) Ach., 1803; Physcia wainioi Räsänen, 1921; Placodium caesium (Hoffm.) Frege, 1812; Psora caesia (Hoffm.) Hoffm., 1795; Squamaria caesia (Hoffm.) Hook., 1844; Xanthoria caesia (Hoffm.) Horw., 1912

= Physcia caesia =

Blue-gray foliose lichen found throughout much of the world

Physcia caesia, known colloquially as blue-gray rosette lichen and powder-back lichen, is a species of foliose lichenized fungus. First described by Georg Franz Hoffmann in 1784, it is common across much of Europe, North America and New Zealand, and more patchily distributed in South America, Asia, Australia and Antarctica. There are 2 subspecies: P. c. caesia and P. c. ventosa, as well as a number of distinct forms and varieties. Molecular studies suggest that the species as currently defined may be polyphyletic. It is typically pale gray shading to darker gray in the center (though some forms are considerably darker), and grows in a small rosette, usually some 2–3 cm (0.79–1.18 in) across at maturity. It only rarely has apothecia, instead reproducing most often vegetatively via soredia, which are piled in round blue-gray mounds across the thallus's upper surface. It grows most often on rock—principally calcareous, but also basaltic and siliceous—and also occurs on bone, bark and soil. It is nitrophilic and is particularly common on substrates where birds perch.

Capable of growing at a multitude of angles on a variety of surfaces, Physcia caesia also tolerates a wide range of environmental extremes from the high temperatures of desert locations to the low temperatures of the Antarctic. It grows on both dry stone and that moistened by seepage, and can survive being irregularly submerged for extended periods underwater. Like many lichens that grow on rock, Physcia caesia is able to extract nutrients from the substrate upon which it grows, as well as from rainwater and atmospheric dust. It is threatened by habitat loss through development, as well as trampling or overgrowth of its location. A number of lichenicolous species are known parasites.

== Taxonomy ==
Physcia caesia was first described by German botanist Georg Franz Hoffmann in 1784 as Lichen caesius. Other lichenologists assigned it to various other genera both before and after it was moved into its current genus by August Emanuel Fürnrohr in 1839. It has two subspecies, P. c. caesia and P. c. ventosa, as well as a number of distinct forms and varieties, some of which were thought to be distinct species in the past. Although this species and Physcia aipolia have been considered a species pair, some molecular studies suggest that they should instead be considered conspecific. Other molecular studies suggest that both Physcia caesia and Physcia aipolia are polyphyletic taxa, with various forms more closely related to other species than to each other. The nomenclatural database MycoBank considers the taxon Physcia wainioi, one of its many synonyms, to be a distinct species.

The genus name Physcia means "inflated" or "sausage-like", referring to the form of the type species. The specific epithet caesia is a Latin word meaning "blue-gray". Physcia caesia is known colloquially as blue-gray rosette lichen and powder-back lichen.

== Description ==
Physcia caesia is a foliose lichen that forms small rosettes, typically measuring 2–3 cm (0.79–1.18 in) across at maturity, though it can reach diameters of up to 7 cm (2.8 in). The thallus is pale gray shading to darker gray in the center, and adheres closely to the substrate on which it grows. Its convex lobes are linear, typically measuring 0.5–1.0 mm (0.02–0.04 in) in width, though occasionally as wide as 2 mm (0.08 in). Forms in some areas, including Greenland, can be considerably darker, with a thallus ranging from gray to dark gray; they can also have broader or narrower lobes. The lichen's surface is white-spotted, though this is not always obvious. It has blue-gray soredia, which are piled in round mounds (such aggregations are known as soralia) across the thallus's upper surface. The lower surface is white to brown with short, dark rhizines. Physcia caesia only rarely has apothecia. Where present, these are black discs measuring up to 2 millimetres (0.08 in) across, with prominent thalline margins (which means the thallus extends up around the edges of the apothecia) and a grayish pruinescence. Each ascus contains 8 spores, which are thick-walled and brown, measuring 18–25 μm (0.00071–0.00098 in) x 6–10 μm (0.00024–0.00039 in). Its photobiont is the green alga Trebouxia impressa, a species associated with many Physcia lichens.

The lichen's cortex and medulla react positively with potassium hydroxide (K), turning yellow. Cortex and medulla react positively with para-phenylenediamene (Pd) as well, also turning yellow. They produce no reaction with calcium or sodium hypochlorite (bleach – C), nor with KC (potassium hydroxide quickly followed by bleach). Among the substances produced by the lichen are atranorin and zeorin.

=== Similar species ===
Physcia caesia was long considered to be a species pair with the very similar Physcia aipolia; the latter is regularly covered with black apothecia, and typically grows epiphytically. Physcia caesia may also be confused with Physcia poncinsii, but the latter has "crateriform" (hollowed, like a bowl or saucer) rather than rounded soralia, and obviously convex lobes. It may also be confused with Physcia dubia which, like Physcia caesia, can be quite variable; however, P. dubia has lip-shaped soralia (which tend to be primarily apical), and its thallus does not react with potassium hydroxide.

== Distribution and habitat ==
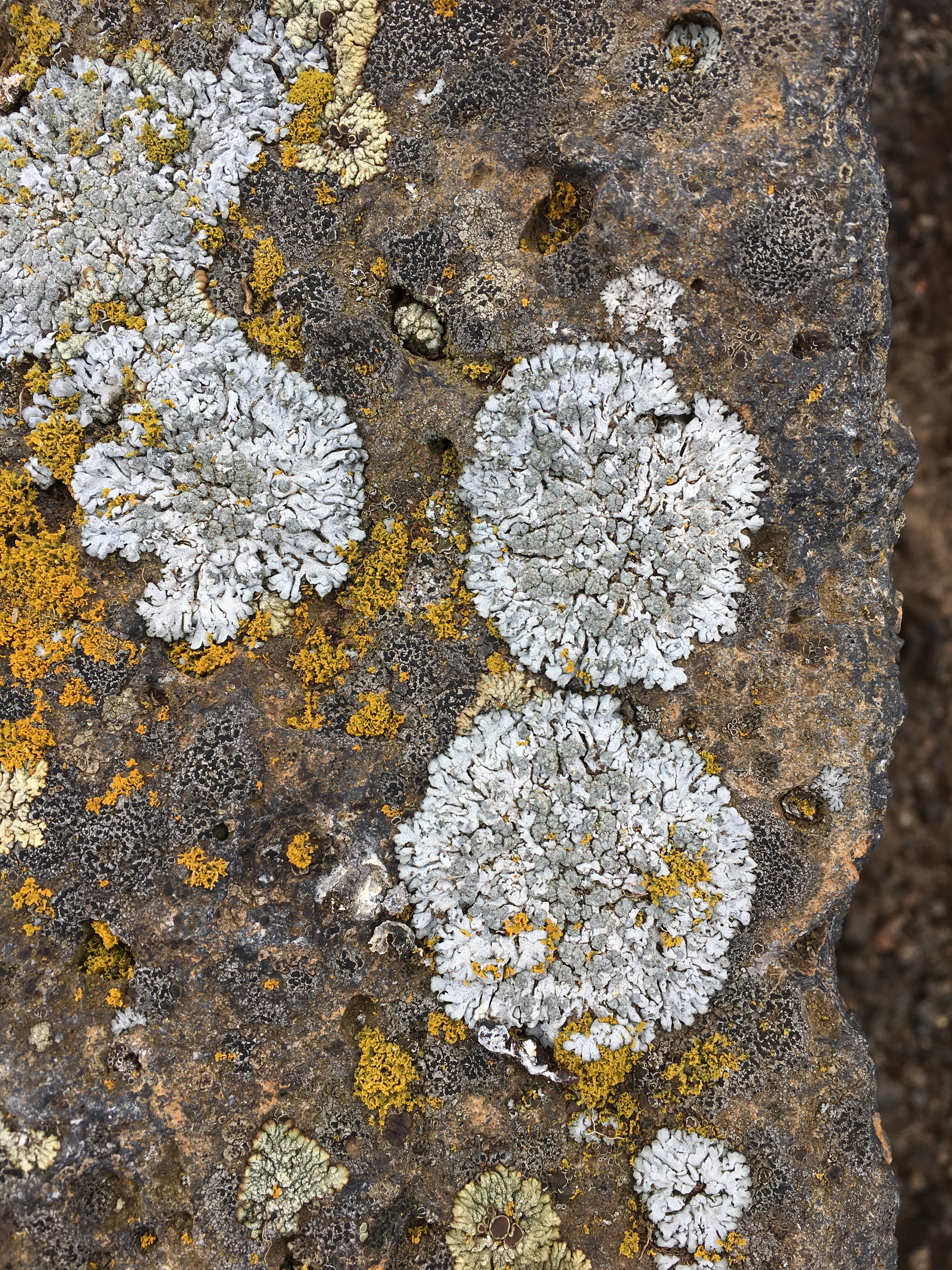
Physcia caesia on rock on St. Paul Island, Alaska

Physcia caesia is widespread across much of the world, found in Arctic, boreal and temperate vegetation zones. Widely distributed across Europe, it is one of the most common species of Physcia in Greenland, and is abundant throughout Britain. Though found across much of North America, it is absent from central and southeastern United States, parts of the Great Basin, and northern Alaska. In South America, it is found in Argentina, Chile, and Peru; common and widespread in temperate areas, it occurs only rarely and only at elevations above 3,700 m (12,100 ft) in tropical regions. It occurs patchily across Asia—in India, Bhutan, Nepal and Japan—as well as in East Africa. It is described as "cosmopolitan" in New Zealand, has been reported from a number of sites in southeastern Australia and Tasmania, and also occurs in Antarctica.

It is common on calcareous substrates, growing on limestone (including tufa) and concrete. It also grows on basaltic and siliceous rock, as well as on bone. It is particularly common on rocks where birds perch and defecate. It is uncommon on bark; however, in the Colorado Rocky Mountains, it is one of the predominant lichens on juniper trees, growing primarily within 0.1 m (3.9 in) of the ground on the northern and eastern side of trunks. In Antarctica, it grows on mosses, soil and gravel, and may be among the species contributing to the formation of a soil crust on the continent. In California, it is found in montane and subalpine forests ranging from 1,000–8,000 ft (300–2,440 m) in elevation.

== Ecology ==
Physcia caesia tolerates a variety of locations, occurring on vertical, angled and horizontal surfaces, as well as rocky overhangs. It is found on both dry stone and stone moistened by seepage, and can tolerate being irregularly submerged underwater. It survives in hot desert conditions, primarily on the north side of slopes. It also thrives in cold conditions, and is able to photosynthesize at temperatures as low as −14 °C (7 °F).

Like many lichens that grow on rocky substrates, Physcia caesia is able to accumulate a number of necessary nutrients—including nitrogen, phosphorus, potassium and iron—from the substrate upon which it grows, as well as from rainwater and atmospheric dust. Its hyphae can extend into substrate as much as 17 mm (0.67 in). It is a nitrophyte and can tolerate higher levels of atmospheric ammonia than can many other species of lichen, because it can survive on substrates with a higher pH. It has been recorded growing on a lead surface (probably a weathered oxide). Physcia caesia is known to accumulate high concentrations of heavy metals, including chromium, zinc, copper and iron. It is slow-growing, with an increase in size of only 0.98 mm (0.04 in) per year for a colony observed in one study.

In Greenland, it often grows in association with other lichen species tolerant of enriched environments, including Umbilicaria arctica, Polycauliona candelaria, Rusavskia elegans, Physcia dubia, and Rhizoplaca melanophthalma. In Poland, it is part of bryophyte communities found on asbestos tile roofs, occurring with Syntrichia ruralis, Orthotrichum anomalum, Grimmia pulvinata, Schistidium apocarpum and others.

Foliose lichens such as Physcia caesia are intermediate in their response to air pollution — less sensitive than fruticose lichens, but more sensitive than crustose lichens. Physcia caesia is found in cities, though at lower frequencies than more pollution-tolerant species. As with most lichens, Physcia caesia is impacted by habitat loss through development, as well as by the trampling or overgrowth of its location. However, the retention of old stone walls, buildings and bridges can help to support its populations, even in cities. Physcia caesia is attacked by lichenicolous fungi, including Polycoccum galligenum, Polycoccum pulvinatum, Zwackhiomyces physciicola and Bryostigma epiphyscium.
