= Angiactis =

Scientific classification
- Domain: Eukaryota
- Kingdom: Fungi
- Division: Ascomycota
- Class: Arthoniomycetes
- Order: Arthoniales
- Family: incertae sedis
- Genus: Angiactis; Aptroot & Sparrius (2008)

Type species
- Angiactis littoralis (Kantvilas) Aptroot & Sparrius (2008)

Species
- A. banksiae A. bermudensis A. littoralis A. spinicola

Genus of lichen-forming fungi

Angiactis is a genus of crustose lichens of uncertain familial placement in the order Arthoniales. It has four species.

== Taxonomy ==
The genus was circumscribed in 2008 by lichenologists André Aptroot and Laurens Sparrius, with Angiactis littoralis assigned as the type species. This lichen was originally described as a species of Lecanographa by Gintaras Kantvilas. The genus name Angiactis derives from the Greek αγγείο ("receptacle") and αὐτός ("shaped"), and refers to the thalline excipulum that covers the fruiting bodies.

== Description ==
Angiactis species have a thalline exciple (rim), but lack a cortex. Their asci are of the Grumulosa-type, and the ascospores are hyaline, with thick walls. The excipulum is carbonized (blackened) and does not have any reaction with a KOH solution.

== Species ==
As of July 2024, Species Fungorum (in the Catalogue of Life) accepts four species of Angiactis:

- Angiactis banksiae (Müll.Arg.) Kantvilas & Stajsic (2020)
- Angiactis bermudensis LaGreca (2008) – Bermuda
- Angiactis littoralis (Kantvilas) Aptroot & Sparrius (2008) – Australia
- Angiactis spinicola Aptroot & Sparrius (2008) – Galápagos
