= Helminthocarpon =

Scientific classification
- Kingdom: Fungi
- Division: Ascomycota
- Class: Arthoniomycetes
- Order: Arthoniales
- Family: incertae sedis
- Genus: Helminthocarpon; Fée (1837)
- Species: H. leprevostii

Binomial name
- Helminthocarpon leprevostii Fée (1837)

Synonyms
- Graphis leprovostii (Fée) Mont. (1845)

Single-species fungal genus

Helminthocarpon is a fungal genus of uncertain familial placement in the order Arthoniales. It comprises the single species Helminthocarpon leprevostii, a crustose lichen. This species, which is widespread in tropical regions of the world, is typically found growing on tree bark, and occasionally on wood.

== Taxonomy ==
Helminthocarpon is a monospecific genus, containing only the species Helminthocarpon leprevostii. First described by the French botanist Antoine Laurent Apollinaire Fée in 1837, its taxonomic placement has been a subject of debate. Several years after Fée's original description of the species, Camille Montagne suggested that the genus Graphis would be a more appropriate placement. Originally classified in the family Graphidaceae due to its lirellate (elongated and furrowed) fruiting bodies, studies in the late 20th and early 21st centuries suggested that Helminthocarpon may be more closely related to members of the order Arthoniales.

Helminthocarpon shares several characteristics with genera in the Arthoniales, particularly Cryptothecia. These include similarities in ascus development, spore structure, and the arrangement of structures surrounding the asci. However, Helminthocarpon differs in having a corticate thallus (outer fungal layer) and more well-defined fruiting structures compared to Cryptothecia. Some researchers have suggested Helminthocarpon may represent an evolutionary link between the less structured fruiting bodies of Cryptothecia and the more defined ones of other Arthoniales genera.

As of 2013, the exact familial placement of Helminthocarpon within the Arthoniales remains unresolved. Further molecular studies are needed to determine whether it belongs in the family Arthoniaceae or Opegraphaceae. The genus is no longer included in major taxonomic outlines of the Graphidaceae.

Two species described from Meghalaya (India) and formerly placed in the genus, Helminthocarpon album and H. cherrapunjiense, were made synonymous with Diorygma radiatum in 2009.

== Description ==
The crustose thallus of Helminthocarpon leprevostii is pale beige in colour with a smooth, somewhat shiny surface. Unlike many related lichens in the Arthoniales, Helminthocarpon has a cortex, a protective outer layer that gives the thallus its distinctive appearance. The ascomata (fruiting bodies) are a defining feature of this species. They appear as short, broad, swollen lirellae – elongated fruiting bodies resembling small beans or furrows. These lirellae are beige to white in colour, similar to the thallus, and develop a wide, irregular central slit as they mature. The internal structure of the lirellae is complex: the sides (exciple flanks) are strongly carbonised, appearing black, but this carbonisation is concealed beneath a thick thalline layer, giving the outward appearance of pale, swollen structures on the lichen surface.

The internal reproductive components of Helminthocarpon are equally distinctive. The asci, or spore-producing cells, develop within a hamathecium – a structure composed of strongly branched and repeatedly joining threads called paraphysoids. These paraphysoids form a dense network around individual asci, a characteristic that distinguishes Helminthocarpon from many other lichens. The asci themselves are cylindrical to narrowly club-shaped, tapering at the base into a stalk. They have a thick, two-layered wall that reacts differently to iodine-based staining: the outer layer does not stain, while the inner layer turns a pale blue. The ascospores are large (89–165 μm long and 22–62 μm wide), colourless, and muriform, meaning they are divided by both longitudinal and transverse septa (internal walls). These septa are curved rather than straight, giving the spores a distinctive appearance. Both the medulla (the internal layer of the thallus) and the spores show no colour change (are negative) when tested with iodine.

== Habitat and distribution ==
Helminthocarpon leprevostii has a pantropical distribution, meaning it is found in tropical regions around the world. The species has been recorded in various locations, including the Galápagos Islands, where it was newly reported in 2013. In terms of habitat preferences, H. leprevostii is primarily corticolous, growing on the bark of trees. It shows a particular affinity for native and endemic tree species in its habitats. In the Galápagos, it has been frequently observed on the bark of Bursera graveolens, Pisonia floribunda, and Cordia lutea. While primarily bark-dwelling, the species has also been occasionally found growing on wood, demonstrating some versatility in its substrate choices.

Helminthocarpon leprevostii appears to favour specific ecological zones within its range. In the Galápagos, it is moderately common throughout the dry zone and lower transition zone of the islands. This suggests a tolerance for, or perhaps preference for, somewhat arid conditions. The lichen tends to grow in semi-shaded to shaded environments that offer some degree of shelter. However, it has also been observed in moderately sunny and exposed sites, indicating a certain adaptability to light conditions. This habitat flexibility may contribute to its widespread distribution in tropical regions.
