= Minksia =

Scientific classification
- Kingdom: Fungi
- Division: Ascomycota
- Class: Arthoniomycetes
- Order: Arthoniales
- Family: incertae sedis
- Genus: Minksia; Müll.Arg. (1882)

Type species
- Minksia caesiella Müll.Arg. (1882)

Species
- M. alba M. caesiella M. candida M. irregularis M. saxicola

Synonyms
- Cyrtographa Müll.Arg. (1894)

Genus of lichens

Minksia is a genus of lichen-forming fungi of uncertain familial placement in the order Arthoniales. The genus was circumscribed by Swiss lichenologist Johannes Müller Argoviensis in 1882 with Minksia caesiella assigned as the type species.

The genus name of Minksia is in honour of Arthur Minks (1846-1908), who was a German doctor and botanist (Mycology and Lichenology), who worked in Stettin.

== Species ==
- Minksia alba Makhija & Patw. (1988) – India
- Minksia caesiella Müll.Arg. (1882)
- Minksia candida Müll.Arg. (1882)
- Minksia irregularis (Müll.Arg.) Müll.Arg. (1895)
- Minksia saxicola J.Hedrick (1942)

Minksia angolensis (Nyl.) Makhija & Patw. is now known as Tremotylium angolense.

Minksia chilena (C.W.Dodge) Redón & Follmann (1972) is now Carbacanthographis chilensis (family Graphidaceae).
