= Sporostigma =

Scientific classification
- Kingdom: Fungi
- Division: Ascomycota
- Class: Arthoniomycetes
- Order: Arthoniales
- Family: incertae sedis
- Genus: Sporostigma; Grube (2001)

Type species
- Sporostigma melaspora (Tuck.) Grube (2001)

Genus of fungi

Sporostigma is a genus of lichenized fungi in the order Arthoniales. Its familial placement is uncertain. This is a monotypic genus, containing the single species Sporostigma melaspora.
