= Synarthonia stigmatidialis =

Scientific classification
- Kingdom: Fungi
- Division: Ascomycota
- Class: Arthoniomycetes
- Order: Arthoniales
- Family: incertae sedis
- Genus: Synarthonia
- Species: S. stigmatidialis

Binomial name
- Synarthonia stigmatidialis Müll.-Arg. (1895)

Species of lichen-forming fungus

Synarthonia stigmatidialis is a species of corticolous (bark-dwelling) crustose lichen of uncertain familial classification in the order Arthoniales. Originally described from a single collection in the Mexican state of San Luis Potosí in 1895, this lichen remains known only from its type locality, making it one of the rarest members of its genus. The species is distinguished by its whitish crusty growth on bark and its clustered fruiting structures that are dusted with a delicate white powder, as well as its distinctive ascospores that develop enlarged cells at their tip and turn pale brown at maturity.

== Taxonomy ==
Synarthonia stigmatidialis was described by Johannes Müller Argoviensis in 1895. He noted that, while it can resemble Stigmatidium at first glance, its tightly packed, stromatic fruiting patches and multi-septate, "macrocephalous" spores with an enlarged apical cell place it in Synarthonia rather than that genus. The type was collected in Mexico (San Luis Potosí) by J.M. Eckfeldt (specimen no. 245, housed in G, the herbarium of the Geneva Botanical Garden). Subsequent re-examination expanded the original spore size range and, for the first time in this species, confirmed iodine reactions and spot test results, providing firmer characters for separating it from related taxa. Within Synarthonia, species characteristically develop fruiting bodies that begin singly but coalesce into clustered "synascomata" set in a shallow pad of fungal tissue (a pseudostroma) with a thin white margin—features that fit S. stigmatidialis.

== Description ==
The thallus forms a thin, cracked (rimose) whitish crust on bark; a fibrous-looking prothallus may border the colony. The fertile structures are grouped into slightly sunken, multi-centred synascomata embedded in a pseudostroma with an inconspicuous to thin white rim; individual ascomata are rounded to short lirellate, and the discs are usually dusted with a delicate white pruina (a fine powdery bloom). Internally, the excipulum is hyaline to pale brownish; the epithecium is greyish to brownish; and the hymenium is clear, 40–70 μm tall, and iodine-positive (I+ blue; KI deep blue). Paraphysoids are richly branched, with slightly thickened, brown-pigmented tips; the hypothecium is hyaline and I+ (deep blue). Asci are 8-spored and of the Arthonia type. Ascospores are hyaline, becoming pale brown when mature, and macrocephalic—that is, the end cells are enlarged. They are usually 4-septate, sometimes 3 or 5, and measure mostly 14.5–19.0 × 5.4–6.6 μm, with occasional extremes from 12 × 4.8 μm up to 22 × 7.0 μm. A thin epispore about 0.5 μm thick is rare. Chemically, the thallus is unreactive to standard chemical spot tests (K−, C−, P−, and UV−); thin-layer chromatography was not conducted in the modern study.

== Habitat and distribution ==
Synarthonia stigmatidialis grows on bark (corticolous). It is known only from the type locality in San Luis Potosí, Mexico.
