= Trichophyma =

Scientific classification
- Kingdom: Fungi
- Division: Ascomycota
- Class: Arthoniomycetes
- Order: Arthoniales
- Family: incertae sedis
- Genus: Trichophyma; Rehm (1905)

Type species
- Trichophyma bunchosiae Rehm (1904)

Species
- T. bunchosiae T. similis

Genus of fungi

Trichophyma is a small genus of fungi in the order Arthoniales. The genus has not been placed into a family. The genus comprises two species.
