= Nipholepis =

Scientific classification
- Kingdom: Fungi
- Division: Ascomycota
- Class: Arthoniomycetes
- Order: Arthoniales
- Family: incertae sedis
- Genus: Nipholepis; Syd. (1935)
- Species: N. filicina

Binomial name
- Nipholepis filicina Syd. (1935)

Single-species fungal genus

Nipholepis is a little-known fungal genus in the order Arthoniales. The genus has not been placed into a family. It is a monotypic genus, containing the single species Nipholepis filicina, found in Venezuela. Both the genus and species were described in 1935 by German mycologist Hans Sydow. Nipholepis filicina is an epiphytic fungus, living on the surface of plant leaves. This plant parasite creates thin, pale patches on fern surfaces that have a soft, jelly-like texture and become slightly see-through when fresh. The fungus produces elongated spores that develop a yellowish colour and crystal-like appearance as they mature within the infected plant tissue.

== Taxonomy ==
The genus Nipholepis was established by Hans Sydow in 1935 as part of his comprehensive study of Venezuelan fungi. Sydow, a German mycologist, created this new genus to accommodate a distinctive fungal species that didn't fit comfortably within existing taxonomic classifications of the time. Sydow found the fungus forming minute white flecks on the lower frond surfaces of the fern Diplazium expansum, the upper surface of which was covered in algae, mosses, and lichens. He noted a resemblance to the lichen Myxotheca hypocreoides, a member of the family Arthoniaceae. The genus name Nipholepis, derived from Greek roots meaning "snow scale", likely refers to the characteristic whitish, scale-like appearance of the fungal stromata on infected plant material. Nipholepis is recognised as a monotypic genus, with a single species: Nipholepis filicina. This species was also described by Sydow in the same 1935 publication, based on specimens he collected from ferns in the Los Rastrojos region of Venezuela. The specific epithet filicina indicates the fungus's association with ferns, from the Latin filix meaning fern.

The taxonomic placement of Nipholepis within the broader classification of fungi has been somewhat problematic due to its unique characteristics. Sydow originally placed it among the stromatic fungi, a group characterised by their formation of specialised tissue masses that house the reproductive structures. However, the precise relationships of this genus to other fungal groups remain unclear, as relatively few specimens have been studied since Sydow's original description. The type specimen, collected from Diplazium expansum (a tropical fern species), remains the primary reference material for this genus.

== Description ==
Nipholepis is a genus of plant-parasitic fungi that produce thin, whitish to pale-yellow stromata—fleshy, membrane-like growths that become slightly translucent and glossy when fresh. The stromatal tissue is soft and gelatinous, forming irregular patches that replace the normal surface of the host and may appear slightly swollen above surrounding tissues.

The reproductive structures are embedded within each stroma. The asci, which bear the spores, are arranged in one to three superposed rows and are relatively short and broad, each containing eight spores. Spores are elongated and ellipsoid to sub-cylindrical, measuring 12–25 μm long by 4.5–6 μm wide, with thin yet resilient walls; at maturity they develop a faint yellowish tint and a conspicuous light-refracting (crystalline) appearance. Sterile hyphae interwoven among the asci reinforce the stromatal matrix. Because the entire reproductive apparatus remains enclosed within the host tissue, the infected areas present as irregular, pale patches with a softer texture than healthy tissue.
