= Gossypiothallon =

Scientific classification
- Kingdom: Fungi
- Division: Ascomycota
- Class: Arthoniomycetes
- Order: Arthoniales
- Family: incertae sedis
- Genus: Gossypiothallon; Aptroot (2014)
- Species: G. appendisporum

Binomial name
- Gossypiothallon appendisporum Aptroot (2014)

Species of lichen

Gossypiothallon is a fungal genus of uncertain familial placement in the order Arthoniales. It contains the single species Gossypiothallon appendisporum, a corticolous (bark-dwelling), crustose lichen found in South Solomons. Both the genus and species were described as new to science in 2014 by Dutch lichenologist André Aptroot. The type specimen was collected from Kolombangara island at an altitude of 700 m (2,300 ft), where it was found growing on bark.

The lichen has a white, crustose thallus lacking a cortex, and with a cottony (byssoid) texture. The ascomata have a pedicel and have pale pink discs that lack differentiated margins. The ascospores, which number eight per ascus, are hyaline, rod-shaped, and have 3 septa; their dimensions are 20–22 by 5.5–6.5 μm. They have two polar, gelatinous appendages that are typically curved. The thallus contains zeorin, a lichen product detectable using thin-layer chromatography. Both the thallus and ascomata do not show any reaction with standard chemical spot tests (i.e., C−, P−, and K−).
