= Hormosphaeria =

Scientific classification
- Kingdom: Fungi
- Division: Ascomycota
- Class: Arthoniomycetes
- Order: Arthoniales
- Family: incertae sedis
- Genus: Hormosphaeria; Lév. (1863)
- Species: H. tessellata

Binomial name
- Hormosphaeria tessellata Lév. (1863)

Genus of fungi

Hormosphaeria is a single-species fungal genus in the order Arthoniales. The genus has not been placed into a family. It contains the species Hormosphaeria tessellata
