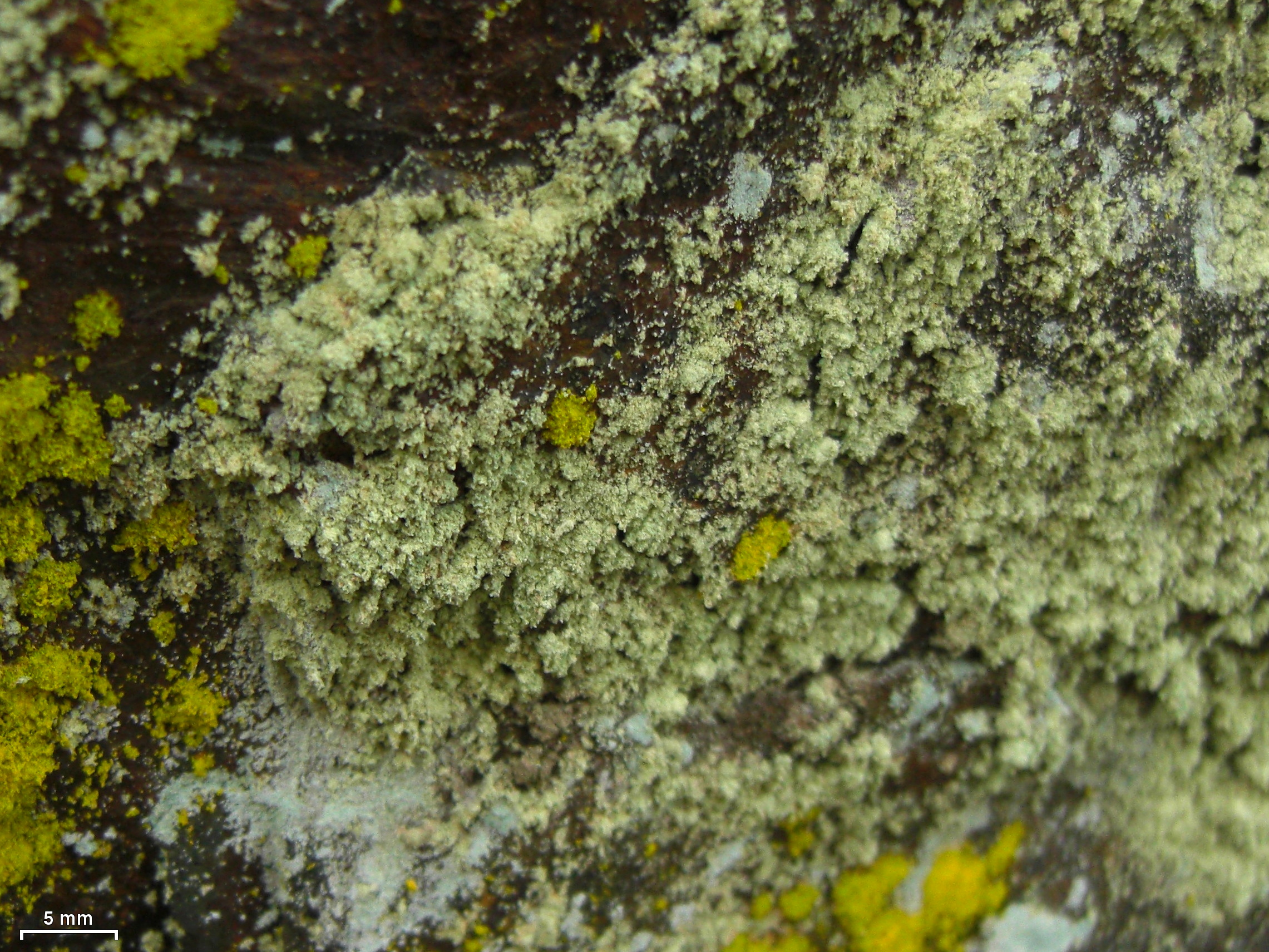
- Andreiomyces morozianus scale bar = 5 mm

Scientific classification
- Kingdom: Fungi
- Division: Ascomycota
- Class: Arthoniomycetes
- Order: Arthoniales
- Family: Andreiomycetaceae; B.P.Hodk. & Lendemer (2013)
- Genus: Andreiomyces; B.P.Hodk. & Lendemer (2013)

Type species
- Andreiomyces morozianus (Lendemer) B.P.Hodk. & Lendemer (2013)

Species
- A. morozianus A. obtusaticus

= Andreiomyces =

Genus of fungi

Andreiomyces is the sole genus in Andreiomycetaceae, a family in the order Arthoniales. Andreiomyces contains two lichen-forming fungi, both of which were previously classified in the genus Lepraria.

== Taxonomy ==
The genus and family were circumscribed in 2013 by lichenologists Brendan Hodkinson and James Lendemer following a molecular phylogenetic study of these and similar lichens. This analysis showed that two leprose lichens had been mistakenly classified in genus Lepraria because of their morphological similarity with members of this genus, but actually belonged to a new genus and family, in a different order. In this phylogenetic analysis, family Andreiomycetaceae has a sister taxon relationship with Chrysothricaceae. The generic name honours Dr. Andrei "Andy" Moroz, spouse of the second author.

== Description ==
Unlike all other members of the Arthoniales, Andreiomyces has a coccoid photobiont, a thallus that is persistently sterile, and it makes obtusatic acid, a lichen product. Andreiomyces obtusaticus additionally produces isousnic acid and an anthraquinone pigment.

== Species ==
- Andreiomyces morozianus (Lendemer) B.P.Hodk. & Lendemer (2013) – Appalachian Mountains, United States
- Andreiomyces obtusaticus (Tønsberg) B.P.Hodk. & Lendemer (2013) – Europe
