= Synarthonia =

Scientific classification
- Kingdom: Fungi
- Division: Ascomycota
- Class: Arthoniomycetes
- Order: Arthoniales
- Family: incertae sedis
- Genus: Synarthonia; Müll.Arg. (1891)

Type species
- Synarthonia bicolor Müll.Arg. (1891)

Species
- See text

Synonyms
- Synarthoniomyces Cif. & Tomas. (1953)

Genus of lichen-forming fungi

Synarthonia is a genus of lichen-forming fungi in the order Arthoniales. The genus has not been placed into a family. These crustose lichens typically form thin, crust-like growths on tree bark in tropical and temperate regions worldwide, though many species have restricted geographical ranges and are known only from single locations. The genus is distinguished by its reproductive structures, which appear as small grouped patches on the lichen surface, and by its spores that change from colourless to brownish as they mature and have distinctive enlarged tip cells. While most species form traditional lichen partnerships with green algae, some members of Synarthonia have evolved to grow parasitically on other lichen species, particularly targeting members of the genera Graphis and lichens in the family Parmeliaceae.

== Taxonomy ==
Synarthonia was circumscribed by Swiss lichenologist Johannes Müller Argoviensis in 1891, based on collections of the type species, Synarthonia bicolor, from Costa Rica. He characterised the new genus as crustose with a chroolepoid (green algal) photobiont whose fruiting bodies are exposed and grouped in small patches on the thallus, and separated it from Arthonia and Chiodecton (sect. Enterographa) chiefly by its spores with several cross-walls that start colourless, turn brownish, and have an enlarged tip cell.

== Description ==
Synarthonia is a genus of lichens that typically grows on tree bark (corticolous). These lichens are crustose, meaning they form a thin, crust-like growth that can range in colour from whitish to greenish-grey to green. The fungal body (thallus) may develop either below or on top of the bark's surface, and its texture varies from smooth to warty or powdery. Some species may produce specialised reproductive structures called soredia, while others lack them. The thallus lacks a protective outer layer (cortex), and its fungal threads (hyphae) are colourless.

Some species develop distinctive boundaries where they meet other lichens, appearing as black to brown lines. In particular, species like S. psoromica and S. stigmatidialis form fibre-like boundaries, while S. sikkimensis produces root-like structures. The photosynthetic partner (photobiont) in these lichens belongs to the Trentepohlia genus of green algae, occurring either as single cells or short chains of round to oval cells. However, some species are non-lichenised and grow parasitically on other lichens, lacking algal cells entirely.

The reproductive structures (ascomata) may appear either singly or in irregular groups. They can be embedded in the thallus or slightly raised above it. The spore-producing surface (disc) may be covered with a white, grey, or orange powder-like coating (pruina), beneath which it appears brown to orange or translucent light brown to blackish-brown, sometimes with remnants of the thallus tissue.

The internal structure is complex, with various layers serving different functions. The spores are produced in sac-like structures (asci) that typically contain eight spores each. The spores themselves start colourless but may develop brown ornamentation at maturity. They can be divided by cross-walls or appear more complex with multiple compartments (muriform). Additional asexual reproductive structures called pycnidia appear as black dots and produce small, colourless, rod-shaped spores (conidia).

The genus is characterised by the presence of various secondary metabolites, including parietin, evernic acid, psoromic acid, and various xanthones, though some species lack secondary compounds entirely. Most species do not contain calcium oxalate crystals, with S. muriformis being a notable exception, occasionally accumulating these crystals in its reproductive structures.

== Habitat and distribution ==
Species of Synarthonia typically have restricted geographical distributions. Most species are known only from single locations or regions: S. bicolor has been documented solely in Costa Rica, while S. psoromica and S. sikkimensis are known only from India. S. sarcographoides has been reported just once from northeastern Brazil, and S. stigmatidialis has a single recorded occurrence in Mexico.

The lichen-forming members of the genus primarily inhabit tropical regions, with fewer species extending into temperate areas. These lichens show a strong preference for growing on tree bark, particularly favouring smooth-barked trees in exposed conditions such as branches and solitary trees. Some species within the genus have evolved a parasitic lifestyle: members of the S. ochracea complex specifically target species of Graphis lichens during their early development stages, while S. rimeliicola exclusively grows on lichens belonging to the family Parmeliaceae.

The current understanding of Synarthonia's distribution may be incomplete, as these lichens are often inconspicuous and easily overlooked in the field. Additionally, many specimens in herbarium collections may be misidentified and filed under different names, particularly as species of the related genus Arthonia.

== Species ==
As of November 2025, Species Fungorum (in the Catalogue of Life) accepts 25 species of Synarthonia:

- Synarthonia albopruinosa Van den Broeck & Ertz (2018) – Democratic Republic of the Congo
- Synarthonia astroidestera (Nyl.) Ertz & Van den Broeck (2018)
- Synarthonia aurantiacopruinosa Van den Broeck & Ertz (2018) – Democratic Republic of the Congo
- Synarthonia bicolor Müll.Arg. (1891)
- Synarthonia borbonica (Ertz, Elix & Grube) Van den Broeck & Ertz (2018)
- Synarthonia ferruginea (Vain.) Van den Broeck & Ertz (2018)
- Synarthonia fuscata Van den Broeck & Ertz (2018) – Democratic Republic of the Congo
- Synarthonia hodgesii (R.C.Harris & Lendemer) Van den Broeck & Ertz (2018)
- Synarthonia inconspicua (Stirt.) Van den Broeck & Ertz (2018)
- Synarthonia josephiana Van den Broeck & Ertz (2018) – Madagascar
- Synarthonia karunaratnei (Weerakoon & Aptroot) Van den Broeck & Ertz (2018)
- Synarthonia leproidica Ertz, Aptroot & Diederich (2020) – Luxembourg
- Synarthonia lopingensis (Zahlbr.) Van den Broeck, Frisch & Ertz (2018)
- Synarthonia muriformis Van den Broeck, Frisch & Ertz (2018) – Madagascar; Uganda
- Synarthonia ochracea (Dufour) Van den Broeck & Ertz (2018)
- Synarthonia ochrodes (Nyl. ex Willey) Van den Broeck & Ertz (2018)
- Synarthonia pilosella Van den Broeck, Eb.Fisch., Killmann & Ertz (2018) – Rwanda
- Synarthonia psoromica S.Joseph & G.P.Sinha (2015) – India
- Synarthonia rimeliicola (Diederich) Van den Broeck, Diederich & Ertz (2018)
- Synarthonia robertiana Soto Medina & Aptroot (2022)
- Synarthonia sarcographoides Aptroot, A.A.Menezes, E.L.Lima & M.Cáceres (2013)
- Synarthonia sikkimensis S.Joseph & G.P.Sinha (2015) – India
- Synarthonia stigmatidialis Müll.Arg. (1895)
- Synarthonia xanthonica Aptroot (2022) – Brazil
- Synarthonia xanthosarcographoides Aptroot (2020)
