= Arthophacopsis =

Scientific classification
- Kingdom: Fungi
- Division: Ascomycota
- Class: Arthoniomycetes
- Order: Arthoniales
- Family: incertae sedis
- Genus: Arthophacopsis; Hafellner (1998)

Type species
- Arthophacopsis parmeliarum Hafellner (1998)

Genus of fungi

Arthophacopsis is a fungal genus in the order Arthoniales. The genus has not been placed into a family. This is a monotypic genus, containing the single species Arthophacopsis parmeliarum. It is a lichenicolous fungus which infects the lichen species Parmelia omphalodes.
