= Paradoxomyces =

Scientific classification
- Domain: Eukaryota
- Kingdom: Fungi
- Division: Ascomycota
- Class: Arthoniomycetes
- Order: Arthoniales
- Family: Arthoniaceae
- Genus: Paradoxomyces; Matzer (1996)

Type species
- Paradoxomyces nymanii Matzer (1996)

Genus of fungi

Paradoxomyces is a genus of lichenized fungi in the family Arthoniaceae. This is a monotypic genus, containing the single species Paradoxomyces nymanii.
