= Tylophorella =

Scientific classification
- Kingdom: Fungi
- Division: Ascomycota
- Class: Arthoniomycetes
- Order: Arthoniales
- Family: incertae sedis
- Genus: Tylophorella; Vain. (1890)

Type species
- Tylophorella polyspora Vain. (1890)

Species
- T. polyspora T. pyrenocarpoides

Synonyms
- Tylophorellomyces Cif. & Tomas. (1953)

Genus of lichens

Tylophorella is a genus of lichen-forming fungi in the order Arthoniales. The genus has not been placed into a family. Tylophorella was circumscribed by Finnish lichenologist Edvard August Vainio in 1890, with Tylophorella polyspora assigned as the type species. T. pyrenocarpoides (a species originally described as Opegrapha pyrenocarpoides by Johannes Müller Argoviensis in 1880) was added to the genus in 1993.

== Species ==
- Tylophorella polyspora Vain. (1890)
- Tylophorella pyrenocarpoides (Müll.Arg.) Egea (1993)
