= Cookellaceae =

Scientific classification
- Kingdom: Fungi
- Division: Ascomycota
- Class: Dothideomycetes
- Order: Myriangiales
- Family: Cookellaceae; Höhn. ex Sacc. & Trotte

Type genus
- Cookella Sacc.

Family of fungi

The Cookellaceae are a family of fungi with an uncertain taxonomic placement in the class Dothideomycetes.
