= Orientophila =

Scientific classification
- Kingdom: Fungi
- Division: Ascomycota
- Class: Lecanoromycetes
- Order: Teloschistales
- Family: Teloschistaceae
- Genus: Orientophila; Arup, Søchting & Frödén (2013)

Type species
- Orientophila subscopularis Arup & Frisch (2013)

Genus of lichens

Orientophila is a genus of lichen-forming fungi in the family Teloschistaceae. It has 15 species of mostly saxicolous (rock-dwelling), crustose lichens. All Orientophila species occur in Northeast Asia including China, Japan, South Korea, and the Russian Far East.

== Taxonomy ==
The genus was circumscribed in 2013 by lichenologists Ulf Arup, Ulrik Søchting, and Patrik Frödén as part of a molecular phylogenetics-led major restructuring of the Teloschistaceae. It was segregated from the large genus Caloplaca, which was shown by several prior studies to be polyphyletic. The authors assigned Orientophila subscopularis as the type species. The genus name, which means "fond of the east", refers to the East Asian distribution of its species. Orientophila is in the subfamily Xanthorioideae of the family Teloschistaceae.

== Description ==
The thalli of Orientophila species have a crust-like appearance that can be either smooth or slightly lobed. Chemically, it contains compounds called anthraquinones. Its outer protective layer, or cortex, has a paraplectenchymatous tissue structure. The reproductive structures, or apothecia, are of the zeorine type and also contain anthraquinones. The spores produced by this genus are polaridiblastic (typical for the family Teloschistaceae), and have a medium to long dividing line known as a septum. Structures called pycnidia, which are involved in asexual reproduction, have not been observed in this genus.

== Species ==
- Orientophila chejuensis (S.Y.Kondr. & Hur) S.Y.Kondr., Lőkös & Hur (2017) – South Korea
- Orientophila corticola B.G.Lee (2020) – South Korea, corticolous
- Orientophila diffluens (Hue) S.Y.Kondr., Lőkös & Hur (2017) – China, South Korea
- Orientophila dodongana S.Y.Kondr., Lőkös & Hur (2019) – South Korea
- Orientophila dodongensis S.Y.Kondr., Lőkös & Hur (2017) – South Korea
- Orientophila fauriei S.Y.Kondr., Lőkös & Hur (2016) – South Korea
- Orientophila imjadoensis S.Y.Kondr., Lőkös & Hur (2019) – South Korea
- Orientophila incheonensis S.Y.Kondr., Lőkös & Hur (2019) – South Korea
- Orientophila infirma I.V.Frolov, Vondrák, Konoreva & S. Chesnokov (2021) – Yakutiya, corticolous
- Orientophila jungakimiae S.Y.Kondr., S.O.Oh & Hur (2016) – South Korea
- Orientophila leucoerythrella (Nyl.) S.Y.Kondr., Lőkös & Hur (2017) – South Korea
- Orientophila loekoesii (S.Y.Kondr. & Hur) Arup, Søchting & Frödén (2013) – China, South Korea
- Orientophila subscopularis Arup & Frisch (2013) – Japan; South Korea
- Orientophila viticola S.Y.Kondr., Lőkös & Hur (2022) – South Korea
- Orientophila yokjidoensis S.Y.Kondr., S.O.Oh & Hur (2016) – South Korea
