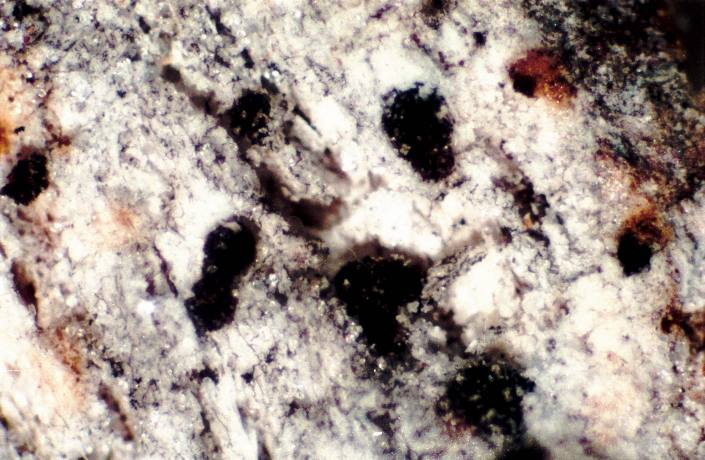
- Arthothelium spectabile

Scientific classification
- Kingdom: Fungi
- Division: Ascomycota
- Class: Arthoniomycetes
- Order: Arthoniales
- Family: Arthoniaceae
- Genus: Arthothelium; A.Massal. (1852)

Type species
- Arthothelium tremellosum (Eschw.) A.Massal. (1852)

Synonyms
- Arthotheliomyces Cif. & Tomas. (1953); Mycarthothelium Vain. (1928)

= Arthothelium =

Genus of lichen-forming fungi

Arthothelium is a genus of lichen-forming fungi in the family Arthoniaceae. Species in the genus typically form crusts on smooth bark in humid, undisturbed habitats. They are distinguished from the related genus Arthonia by their spores, which are divided by both transverse and longitudinal walls into a brick-like pattern. The genus has a cosmopolitan distribution, with most species occurring in tropical regions.

== Taxonomy ==
Arthothelium was introduced as a new genus by the Italian lichenologist Abramo Bartolommeo Massalongo in 1852, for species that earlier authors had treated among genera such as Arthonia, Graphis, and Opegrapha. In the protologue, Massalongo defined the genus by its gelatinous apothecia, which are concealed by the thallus when young but later become swollen, misshapen, and rough-wrinkled, and by ovoid to pear-shaped asci bearing 6–8 spores with only barely visible paraphyses. He described the spores as ovoid-ellipsoid and initially colourless, then increasingly divided by 8–10 transverse septa and 1–2 longitudinal septa (forming many internal "cells", or lumina), and finally darkening to a sooty brown at maturity; the thallus itself was described as a uniform, closely attached crust.

Arthothelium is considered polyphyletic, meaning the genus likely includes species that do not share a common evolutionary ancestor, and further study is needed on its type species, Arthothelium tremellosum.

== Description ==
Arthothelium is a genus of crustose lichens, which can either be immersed (embedded within the substrate) or superficial (growing on the surface). The thallus may spread freely or be confined to specific areas. The lichen's photobiont (the algae or cyanobacteria involved in its symbiosis) can vary, including types from the genus Trentepohlia, the family Chlorococcaceae, or may be absent altogether.

The reproductive structures resemble apothecia, a common form of lichen fruiting body, and come in various shapes, from flat to convex, and may be elongated or star-like. These structures, known as the disc, range in colour from red-brown to black, and can sometimes have a frosted, powdery appearance (pruinose). A thalline margin, which in some lichens surrounds the fruiting body, is absent in Arthothelium. The exciple, a rim of tissue found in some lichen fruiting bodies, is also absent.

The uppermost layer of the apothecium, the epithecium, can be colourless, red-brown, or dark brown. Below this, the hymenium, where the spores develop, often turns blue when tested with iodine (I+). The hypothecium, the supportive tissue beneath the hymenium, is variable in thickness and ranges from dark red-brown to dark brown in colour. The hymenium contains filaments called paraphysoids, which are sparsely to densely branched and often have swollen, red-brown tips.

The asci (spore-producing cells) are usually clavate (club-shaped) or ellipsoidal, containing eight spores. They are semi-fissitunicate, meaning they have two wall layers that split during spore release, and feature a large apical dome with a distinct ocular chamber. The ascospores are obovoid to ellipsoidal, colourless, and muriform, meaning they are divided by multiple internal walls, creating a brick-like pattern. This is a key distinguishing feature from similar genera like Arthonia, where the spores are only divided by transverse walls. Conidiomata (structures producing asexual spores) resemble those found in Arthonia. The genus generally lacks lichen products (secondary metabolites), in species found in Britain and Ireland, but elsewhere, species may contain xanthones or anthraquinones.

== Habitat and distribution ==
Arthothelium typically grows on smooth bark in humid, undisturbed habitats, although it is rarely found on rock. The genus has a cosmopolitan distribution, with most species occurring in tropical regions.

== Species ==
As of October 2024, Species Fungorum (in the Catalogue of Life) accept 26 species of Arthothelium:

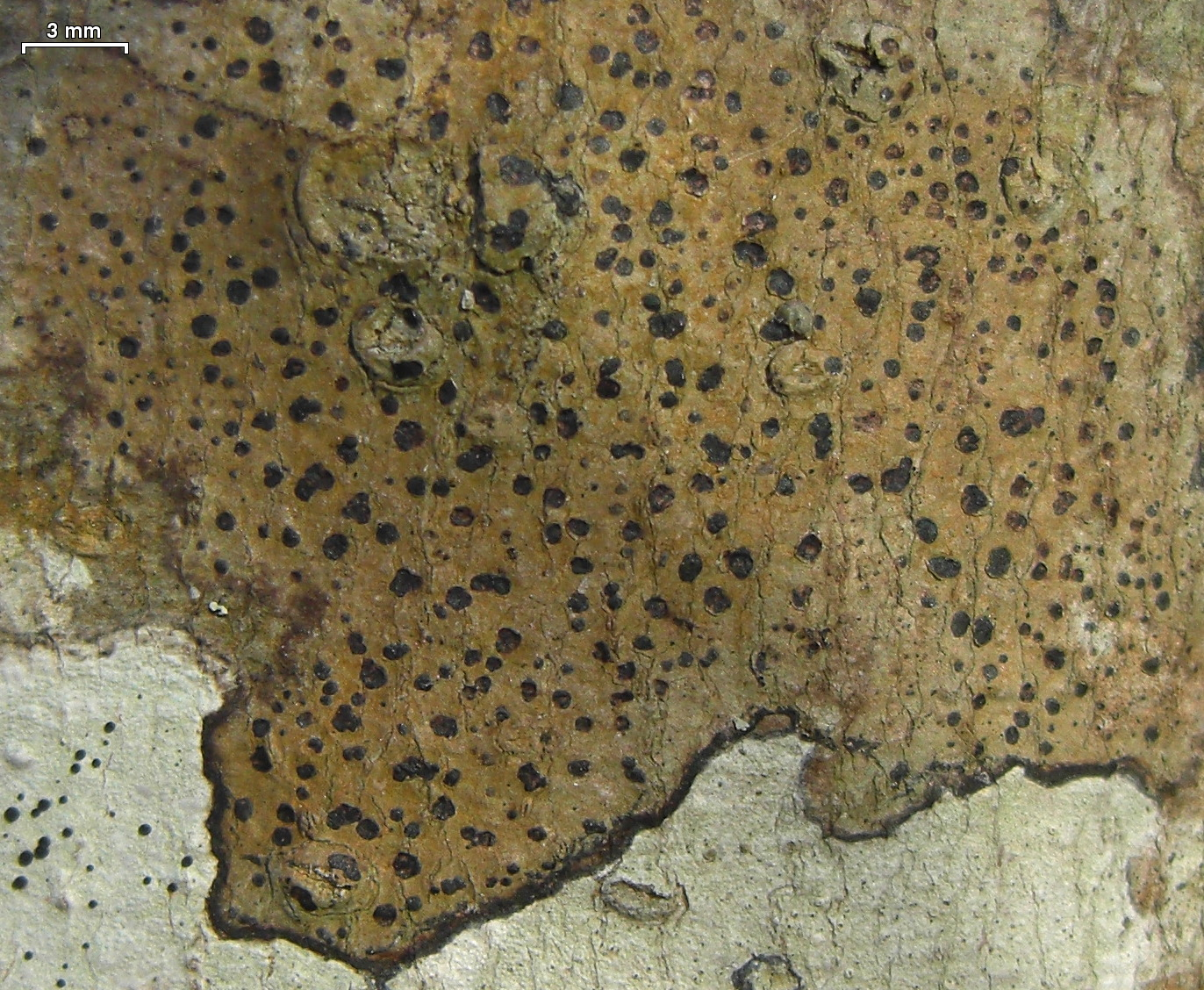
Arthonia interveniens

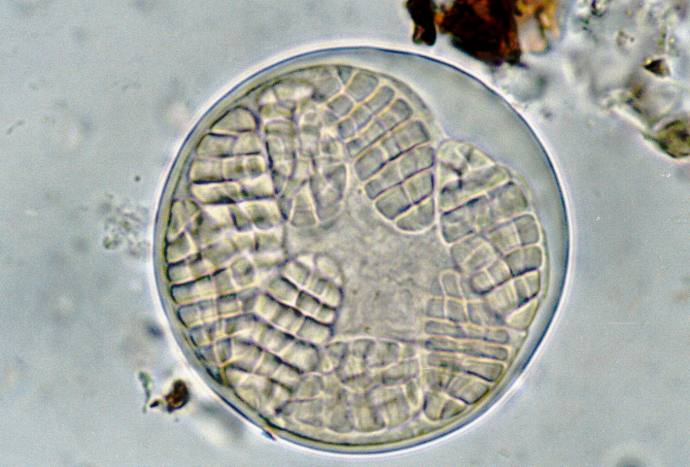
Photograph of an ascus from A. spectabile taken through a compound microscope (x1000), showing a ballon-shaped ascus containing eight, hyaline, muriform spores.

- Arthothelium ampliatum (C.Knight & Mitt.) Müll.Arg. (1893)
- Arthothelium atrorubrum Van den Broeck & Ertz (2017)
- Arthothelium aurantiacopruinosum Van den Broeck & Ertz (2017)
- Arthothelium bacidinum Kantvilas (2021)
- Arthothelium cinereoargenteum (C.Knight ex Shirley) Zahlbr. (1922)
- Arthothelium desertorum Aptroot & V.Wirth (2006)
- Arthothelium dictyosporum (Coppins & P.James) Coppins (1989)
- Arthothelium diffluens (Nyl.) Imshaug & Fryday (2002)
- Arthothelium evanescens Øvstedal (2001)
- Arthothelium feuereri Aptroot & Seaward (2004)
- Arthothelium frischianum Van den Broeck & Ertz (2017)
- Arthothelium huegelii (Nyl.) Zahlbr. (1922)
- Arthothelium hymeniicola Ertz & Fryday (2017)
- Arthothelium infuscatum (Kremp.) Müll.Arg. (1894)
- Arthothelium insolitum Kantvilas (2021)
- Arthothelium interveniens (Nyl.) Müll.Arg. (1893)
- Arthothelium isidiatum Aptroot & Etayo (2017)
- Arthothelium japonicum (Vain. & Yasuda) H.Harada (2004)
- Arthothelium lirellans (Almq.) Coppins (1979)
- Arthothelium macounii (G.Merr.) W.J.Noble (1987)
- Arthothelium macounioides Kantvilas (2021)
- Arthothelium macrothecum (Fée) A.Massal. (1852)
- Arthothelium magenteum Kantvilas (2021)
- Arthothelium microsporum Müll.Arg. (1895)
- Arthothelium miesii Van den Broeck, Tehler & Ertz (2017)
- Arthothelium norvegicum Coppins & Tønsberg (1984)
- Arthothelium orbilliferum (Almq.) Hasse (1913)
- Arthothelium polycarpum Müll.Arg. (1895)
- Arthothelium pulverulentum Müll.Arg. (1893)
- Arthothelium punctatum J.S.Park & Hur (2017)
- Arthothelium ruanum (A.Massal.) Körb. (1861)
- Arthothelium scandinavicum Th.Fr. (1865)
- Arthothelium spectabile A.Massal. (1852)
- Arthothelium subspectabile Vězda & Kantvilas (1992)
- Arthothelium velatius Müll.Arg. (1893)
