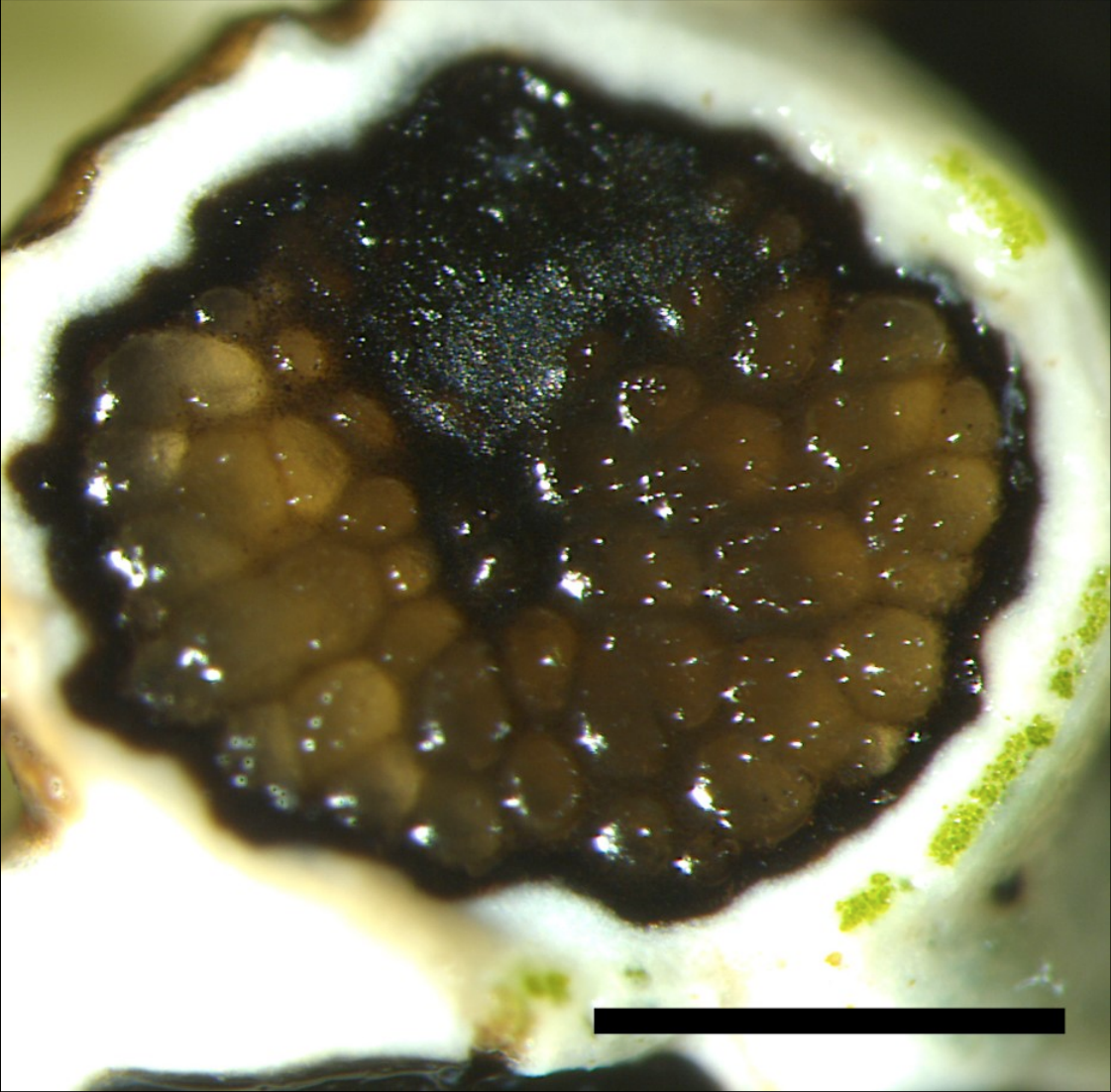
- Horizontal section of a gall of Perigrapha superveniens soaked in water, showing perithecioid locules in fungal stroma. Scale = 0.5 mm.

Scientific classification
- Kingdom: Fungi
- Division: Ascomycota
- Class: Arthoniomycetes
- Order: Arthoniales
- Family: incertae sedis
- Genus: Perigrapha; Hafellner (1996)

Type species
- Perigrapha superveniens (Nyl.) Hafellner (1996)

= Perigrapha (fungus) =

Genus of fungi

Perigrapha is a genus of fungi within the order Arthoniales that is parasitic on lichens. The genus has not been placed into a family. The genus was established in 1996 when researchers discovered that a fungal parasite previously classified elsewhere had unique characteristics that required its own separate genus. These fungi are distinguished by their unusual spores, which develop long, black, hair-like tails that can be longer than the spore body itself—a feature not found in any other related fungal group.

== Taxonomy ==
Perigrapha was erected in 1996 by the Austrian lichenologist Josef Hafellner when he showed that the parasite then known as Melanotheca superveniens differed fundamentally from true Melanotheca and its relatives in the Pyrenulales. Hafellner transferred the species to his new genus as Perigrapha superveniens (the sole species recognised to date) and placed the taxon in the family Opegraphaceae, order Arthoniales. The genus is defined by black, perithecioid carpocentres that cluster in a shallow pseudostroma and by unusually "tailed" ascospores: the perispore—that is, the gelatinous outer layer of each spore—condenses into a slender, jet-black appendage up to 50 μm long. These characters separate Perigrapha from superficially similar lichen parasites such as Plectocarpon, which has lens-shaped (lenticular) fruiting bodies and spores without tails (caudate).

== Description ==
The parasite forms no visible thallus of its own; instead, colourless (hyaline) hyphae thread through the outer layers of the host lichen, eventually giving rise to low, black cushions (pseudostromata) studded with five to ten pin-prick openings. Each opening leads into a perithecioid carpocentre 200–300 μm across whose wall is impregnated with a granular, reddish-brown pigment that turns deep red-black in potassium hydroxide solution. Beneath the carpocentres lies a loose weave of lightly pigmented hyphae, while a flap-like hull of small, dark cells encircles each fruiting chamber.

Inside, the hymenium is threaded by a sparse reticulum of paraphysoids about 2 μm thick; these supporting filaments remain colourless except right at the ostiole. The asci are of the Opegrapha-type—slightly club-shaped to cylindrical, 80–100 × 12–15 μm—and typically containing eight narrowly fusiform spores. Each ascospore bears three internal cross-walls (septa) and measures 30–35 × 4.5–6 μm; at the basal end, the perispore elongates into a hair-like, black appendage that may exceed the spore body in length. This caudate extension, unknown elsewhere in the Arthoniales, gives mature spores a whisker-tailed outline reminiscent of certain dothidealean and sordariaceous fungi. All tissues of the asci show a hemiamyloid reaction—turning blue when iodine is applied after potassium hydroxide pretreatment—while no asexual propagules (pycnidia) have been observed.

== Ecology ==
Ecologically Perigrapha is highly selective, so far recorded only on the foliose lichen Parmelia sulcata in oceanic, nitrogen-rich woodland or coastal habitats. Collections are scarce and scattered: the holotype came from Brittany (France), and additional material is known from montane oak–chestnut woodland on Madeira. At the time of its original publication, no records existed from northern or central Europe despite extensive surveys, suggesting that the fungus is genuinely rare—or easily overlooked when sterile.

== Species ==
- Perigrapha cetrariae Zhurb. 2018)
- Perigrapha lobariae Zhurb. (2015)
- Perigrapha nitida Ertz, Diederich, Christnach & Wedin (2005)
- Perigrapha phaeophysciae Etayo & Pérez-Vargas (2013)
- Perigrapha superveniens (Nyl.) Hafellner (1996)
