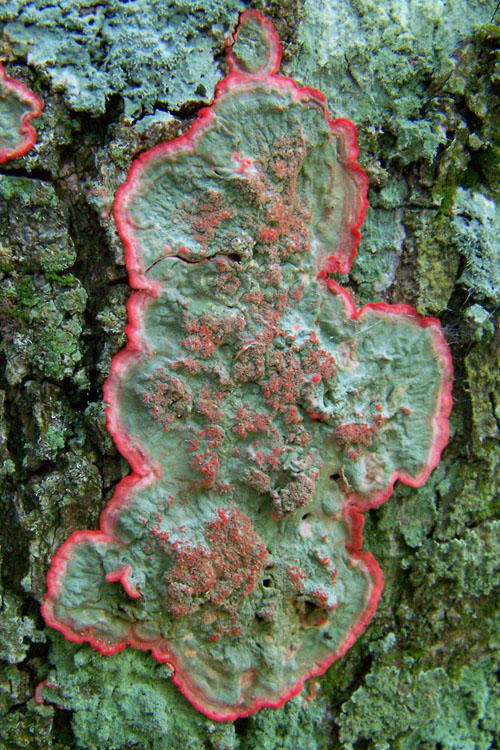
- Cryptothecia rubrocincta

Scientific classification
- Kingdom: Fungi
- Division: Ascomycota
- Class: Arthoniomycetes
- Order: Arthoniales; Henssen ex D. Hawksw. & O.E. Erikss. (1986)

Families
- Andreiomycetaceae; Arthoniaceae; Chrysotrichaceae; Lecanographaceae; Opegraphaceae; Roccellaceae; Roccellographaceae

= Arthoniales =

Order of fungi

The Arthoniales is the second largest order of mainly crustose lichens, but fruticose lichens are present as well. The order contains around 1500 species, while the largest order with lichenized fungi, the Lecanorales, contains more than 14000 species.

== Classification ==
The Arthoniales is one of two orders of the class Arthoniomycetes within the phylum Ascomycota. The order includes seven families (Andreiomycetaceae, Arthoniaceae, Chrysotrichaceae, Lecanographaceae, Opegraphaceae, Roccellaceae and Roccellographaceae). Lecanographaceae, Roccellographaceae, Opegraphaceae and Roccellaceae are well-supported families within Arthoniales, and they were circumscribed in 2011. Andreiomycetaceae was described as a new family by Hodkinson and Lendemer in 2013.

The Arthoniales is the sister group to Dothideomycetes.

- - - Arthoniales
      - - Andreiomycetaceae
        - Chrysothricaceae
      - - - - Rocellaceae
            - Opegraphaceae
          - Rocellographaceae
        - Lecanographaceae
        - Arthoniaceae
    - Curvularia brachyspora
  - Cudonia circinans
- Seynesia erumpens

Figure 1. Cladogram of the Arthoniales, rooted with Curvularia brachyspora, Cudonia circinans and Seynesia erumpens as the outgroup. The cladogram shows the division of Arthoniales into seven families, based on Hodkinson et al. 2013.

== Distribution and habitats ==
The Arthoniales is distributed in most habitats worldwide, as it ranges at latitudes from arctic to tropical regions. They grow on different types of substrates like bark, wood, rocks, bryophytes and living leaves. The order has adapted to live in both humid forests and dry habitats like savannas and steppes, as well as varying altitudes from sea level to alpine regions. The highest species diversity are known from subtropical coastal areas with a Mediterranean or dry climate. The species diversity of the Arthoniales is expected to be higher than currently reported from several areas worldwide like the tropical rain forests.

== Ecology ==
The majority of species in Arthoniales have a lichenized lifestyle, but lichenicolous and saprophytic species are presented as well. The original state in the Arthoniales is believed to be the lichenized state, and the non-lichenized and parasitic states have evolved independently several times. The lichenized fungi live in symbiosis with a photobiont that in most cases is a species of Trentepohliaceae, but photobionts from Chlorococcaleae are known from Chrysotrichaceae and a few species in Arthonia.

== Characters ==
It is difficult to mention typical morphological characters like fruit body, exiple, hypothecium, hymenium, chemistry, ascospore color and ascospore septation that can be used as uniting traits for delimiting families and genera in the Arthoniales. The reason is that the Arthoniales is an old order and taxa have evolved in parallel for a long time, which gives a high level of homoplasy.

=== Ascomatal anatomy ===
The ascomata are usually apothecial and it produces bitunicate asci. The bitunicate asci are thick-walled, with an outer and inner layer. The outer and inner layer of the ascus wall are called exotunica and endotunica, and they separate during ascospore release. The asci usually contains eight ascospores, while the shape and separation of the ascospores are more variating.

=== Thallus ===
The majority of the species in Arthoniales are crustose lichens, with a thallus growing tight to the surface. Fruticose lichens have a bushy thallus and are known in Roccellaceae, where it has evolved and been lost multiple times. The thalli among crustose lichens can either grow within the substrate, called endophloeodal or it can grow at the surface of the substrate, called epiphloedal.

== Genera incertae sedis ==
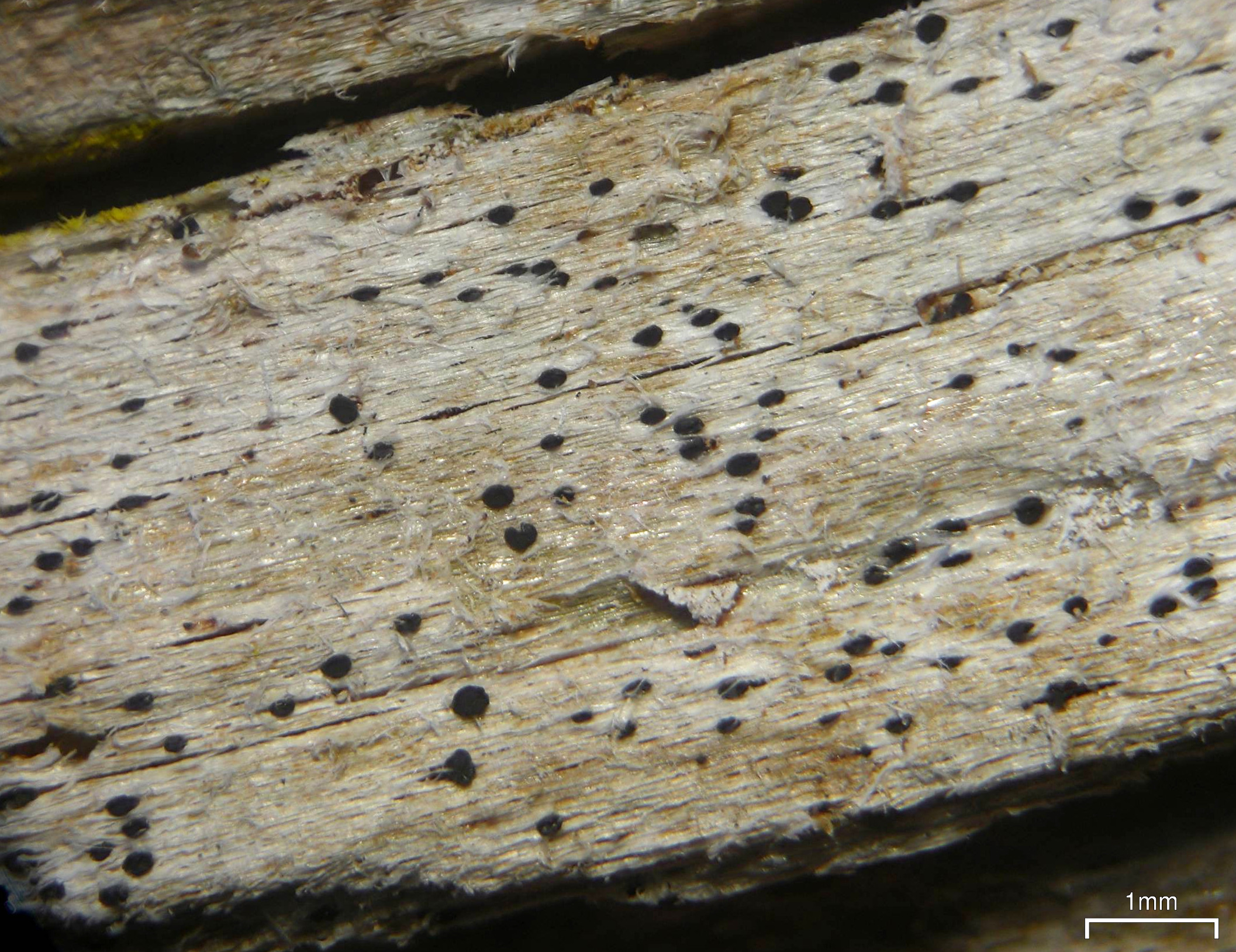
Bactrospora brevispora, shown here growing on a cypress stump, is one of many taxa of uncertain familial placement in the Arthoniales.

The following genera have been tentatively classified in the Arthoniales but have not been placed with any certainty into a family.

- Angiactis Aptroot & Sparrius (2008) – 3 spp.
- Arthophacopsis Hafellner (1998) – 1 sp.
- Bactrospora A.Massal. (1852) – 35 spp.
- Bryostigma Poelt & Döbbeler (1979) – 3 spp.
- Catarraphia A.Massal. (1860) – 1 sp.
- Felipes Frisch & G.Thor (2014) – 1 sp.
- Glyphopsis Aptroot (2014) – 1 sp.
- Gossypiothallon Aptroot (2014) – 1 sp.
- Helminthocarpon Fée (1837) – 3 spp.
- Hormosphaeria Lév. (1863) – 1 sp.
- Minksia Müll.Arg. (1882) – 2 spp.
- Nipholepis Syd. (1935) – 1 sp.
- Paradoxomyces Matzer (1996) – 1 sp.
- Perigrapha Hafellner (1996) – 5 spp.
- Phacothecium Trevis. (1857) – 1 sp.
- Phoebus R.C.Harris & Ladd (2007) – 1 sp.
- Sporostigma Grube (2001) – 1 sp.
- Synarthonia Müll.Arg. (1891) – 5 spp.
- Synarthothelium Sparrius (2009) – 2 spp.
- Tarbertia Dennis (1974) – 1 sp.
- Trichophyma Rehm (1905) – 2 spp.
- Tylophorella Vain. (1890) – 1 sp.
- Wegea Aptroot & Tibell (1997) – 1 sp.
