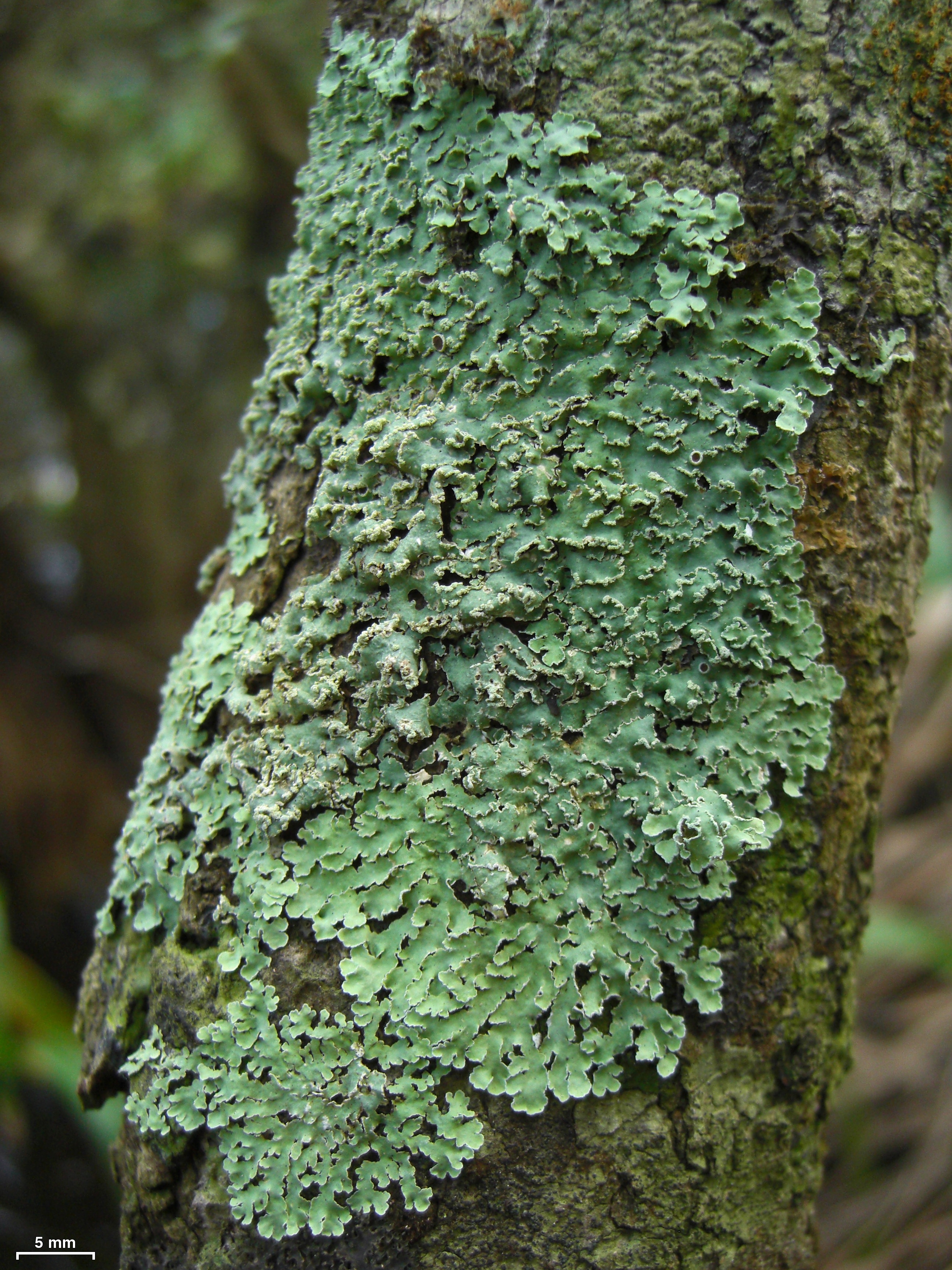
- Physcia millegrana

Scientific classification
- Kingdom: Fungi
- Division: Ascomycota
- Class: Lecanoromycetes
- Order: Caliciales
- Family: Physciaceae
- Genus: Physcia (Schreb.) Michaux (1803)

Type species
- Physcia tenella (Scop.) DC. (1805)

Synonyms
- Lichen sect. Physcia Schreb. (1791); Physciomyces E.A.Thomas ex Cif. & Tomas. (1953); Neophyscia M.Choisy (1959)

= Physcia =

Genus of lichens

Physcia is a genus of lichen-forming fungi in the family Physciaceae. The widely distributed genus contains about 80 species. The genus is cosmopolitan, and has been extensively studied in various regions in the past several decades, with significant biodiversity in South America identified as a central diversity hotspot. Physcia species are foliose, lobate lichens that grow with a loose to close appressed habit. Their upper surface is typically whitish, pale greenish, green-grey, or dark grey in colour. The thallus colour remains relatively unchanged when moistened. Physcia lichens typically grow on bark, on wood, or rock, although they have occasionally been recorded dwelling on man-made structures. They thrive in nutrient-rich environments and are expanding rapidly in urban areas of the United Kingdom previously affected by SO_{2} pollution.

The main characteristics that separate Physcia from similar genera in the same order, including Dirinaria, Heterodermia, Hyperphyscia, Kashiwadia, Phaeophyscia, and Pyxine, are the distinct morphology of its ascospores (brown and two-celled), its somewhat cylindrical pycnoconidia (asexual reproductive structures), and the presence of the chemical atranorin in the upper cortex. Physcia has been divided into sections based on morphological and chemical characters, such as the presence or absence of cilia on the thallus margins and K+ (yellow) spot test reaction in the cortex.

The genus Physcia was formally established by André Michaux in 1805, who elevated it from a section within the genus Lichen as originally outlined by Johann Christian Daniel von Schreber in 1791. Over the years, the genus has been divided into various sections based on characters such as hypothecium colour, presence of cilia, thallus spotting, and chemical reactions, with significant contributions from taxonomists like Edvard August Vainio in 1890 and Roland Moberg, who in 1977 and later in 1986, refined the infrageneric classification of this diverse genus.

Numerous lichenicolous fungi are known to colonise Physcia species include those with species epithets reflecting their ecological ties to this host, such as Bryostigma epiphyscium and Xanthoriicola physciae. Infections by these fungi can cause distinct physical symptoms useful for identification, such as the gall formations by Syzygospora physciacearum and the orange discolouration by Marchandiomyces auranticus. Additionally, the long cilia of Physcia adscendens, which confer velcro-like attachment capabilities to the thallus of this species, are used by birds in nest building. Some Physcia species have been employed in biomonitoring studies of air quality.

== Systematics ==
=== Historical taxonomy ===
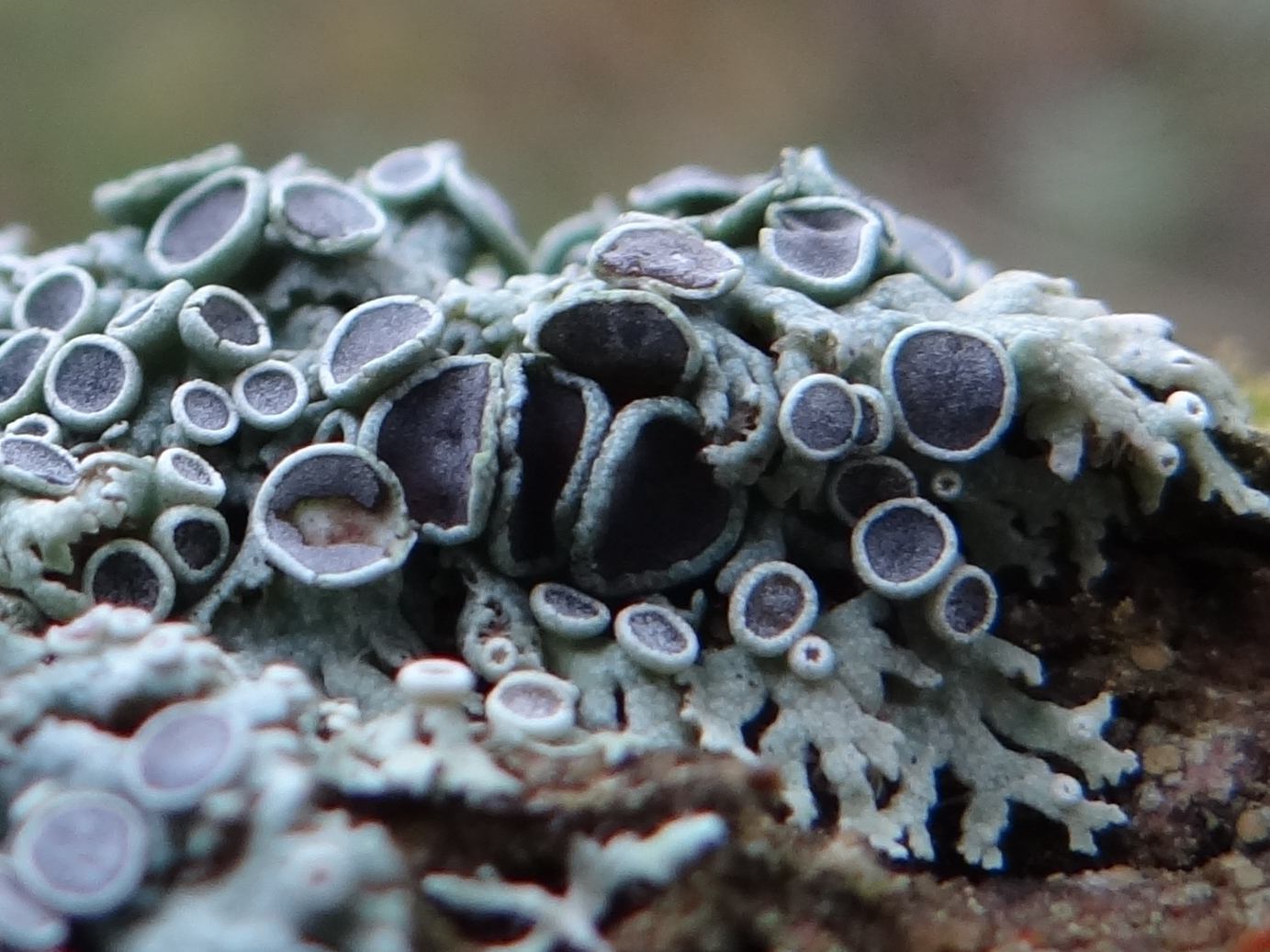
Physcia stellaris was the first of its genus to be formally described.

The first member of the present-day genus Physcia to be formally described was Physcia stellaris. This was one of several dozen lichen species described by the Swedish taxonomist Carl Linnaeus in his 1753 treatise Species Plantarum. The genus was originally circumscribed in 1791 by Johann Christian Daniel von Schreber as a section of the genus Lichen. André Michaux promoted the section to full genus status in 1805. Although he cited the description given by Erik Acharius in his 1798 Prodromus, Acharius himself had treated the taxon as a tribus, meaning that it is not validly published according to the rules of botanical nomenclature. Because Acharius in an earlier 1794 publication cited Schreber 1791, the authorship of the basionym is attributed to him. The type species of the genus was only chosen about 150 years later: in 1963, John Walter Thomson chose Physcia tenella (Scop.) DC. from the list elaborated by Michaux (1803) based on the species cited by Acharius (1798). Physcia is the type genus of the Physciaceae, a family proposed by Alexander Zahlbruckner in 1898.

=== Infrageneric classification ===
In 1890, Edvard August Vainio, divided the genus into two sections, Euphyscia and Dirinaria, which were characterised by having a colourless or brownish-black hypothecium, respectively. Euphyscia, in turn, was divided into Albida (K+ yellow thallus) and Sordulenta (K−), while the latter was further divided into Brachysperma and Macrosperma based on the morphology of their conidia. Gustaf Einar Du Rietz used Vainio's sectional arrangement in his 1925 treatment of Scandinavian Physcia species. A decade later, Lynge proposed instead a different infrageneric organisation, dividing the genus into the subgenera Macrosperma and Brachysperma, the latter of which was further subdivided into several sections.

The Swedish lichenologist Roland Moberg has authored or co-authored numerous scientific publications on the taxonomy and phytogeography of Physcia and related genera. In a 1977 work, he divided Physcia into four sections:

- Sect. Physcia (type: P. tenella)

- Distinguished by the presence of cilia along the edges of the lobes.

- Sect. Caesiae (type: P. caesia)

- Identified by a maculated (spotted) thallus surface, lobes that are cilia-free, and both cortex and medulla reacting K+ yellow, with atranorin present along with zeorin.

- Sect. Fusisporae (type: P. magnussonii)

- Characterised by their narrowly ellipsoid spores featuring a unique ornamentation on their surface.

- Sect. Stellares (type: P. dubia)

- Noted for the absence of marginal cilia and maculation on the surface, as well as a K-negative spot test reaction in the medulla.

In 1986, Moberg proposed an additional section:

- Sect. Atrae (type: P. atrostriata)

- Identified by an upper surface without maculation, a cortex and medulla that both react K+ yellow (containing atranorin and zeorin), no cilia, and a black underside.

=== Naming ===
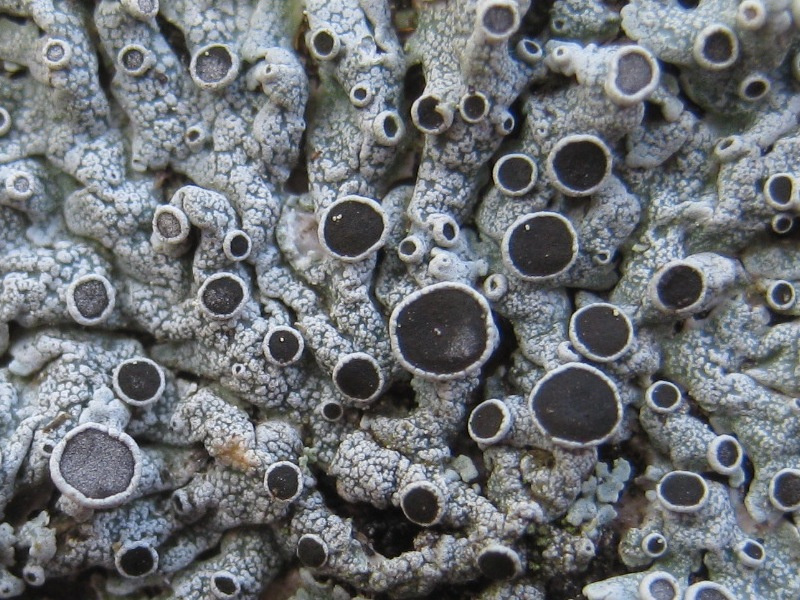
The vesiculose, or blistered, aspect of the thallus surface, seen here in Physcia aipolia, may have been the inspiration of the genus name.

The generic name Physcia is derived from the Ancient Greek Φυσκίων, physkion, meaning "bladder" or "blister". One source suggests that this name alludes to the lichen's apothecia and soredia found on its foliose thallus, which give the surface a vesiculose ("blistered") aspect when these reproductive structures develop. In an alternative etymological interpretation, John Alan Elix suggests that the name was originally intended to refer to species with inflated or hollow lobes. However, he notes, the name is somewhat of a misnomer, as species like Physcia physodes (now classified as Hypogymnia physodes) that were originally included under this term, no longer fall within the genus.

Species in the genus Physcia are commonly known as "rosette lichens". This common name alludes the centrifugal (rosette-like) growth form characteristic of many of the species.

== Species pairs ==
Species pairs within a genus are closely related species that are morphologically similar but can be distinguished by subtle differences, often in their chemical compositions or reproductive strategies. However, advanced molecular methods have challenged the traditional concept of species pairs within the genus Physcia, which was previously defined largely through these similarities. Molecular analyses reveal that the phylogenetic relationships among taxa like Physcia aipolia and P. caesia are more complex than previously understood. These findings indicate that distinctions based on morphological and chemical characteristics alone do not necessarily reflect the true genetic diversity and evolutionary relationships within the genus. Consequently, the concept of species pairs, which suggests a straightforward dichotomy between similar species, is considered outdated. This perspective advocates for an integrative approach to species differentiation that combines morphological, chemical, and genetic data to more accurately delineate species within Physcia.

== Description ==
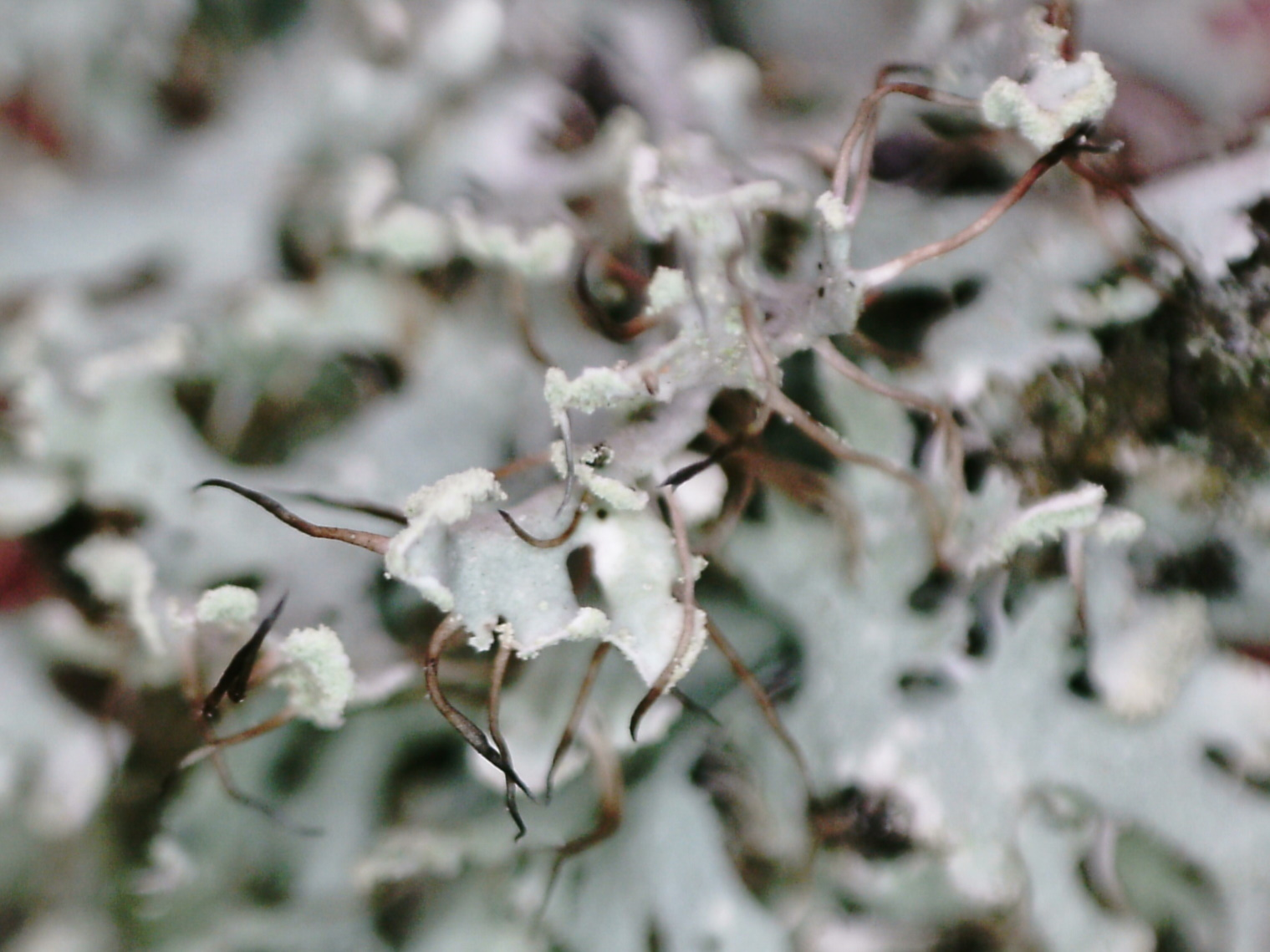
Physcia tenella has soredia and cilia on the margins of its lobes.

The thallus of Physcia is foliose, meaning it is leaf-like in structure, and lobate, typically forming a roughly circular shape with lobes radiating outward. The thallus is generally loosely attached to its substrate Thallus lobes are narrow, generally less than 3 mm wide, with a colouration that ranges from whitish and bluish-grey to dark grey. The thallus of Physcia grows to about 8 cm (3 in) in diameter, although neighbouring thalli can combine to form more extensive growths. The upper surface colour ranges from greenish grey or whitish grey to dark grey. The thallus shows minimal colour change or remains unchanged when wet. The surface can be matt or slightly glossy and might display minute white spots known as pseudocyphellae (tiny pores that allow gas exchange) visible with magnification. The texture of the surface varies from smooth to wrinkled (rugose) to pimpled (verrucose), as in the example of P. verrucosa. Sometimes, the surface is covered with white maculae (spots). The lobes may also be covered with a fine, white powdery coating (pruina) and can have fringe-like projections (cilia) along the edges. Although the value of pruina as a taxonomic character is sometimes considered dubious due to possible environmental influences, a group of species has a constant, fine, and homogeneous pruinosity, mainly on the distal parts of the upper thallus surface: P. atrostriata, P. krogiae, P. phaeocarpa, P. undulata, and P. verrucosa.

The underside of the thallus is typically whitish, pale tan, grey, or pinkish. In contrast, the lower surface of Physcia atrostriata is distinctively prosoplectenchymatous, featuring a brown-black colour with striations, which sets it apart from other species in the genus. The thallus underside has rhizines, which are root-like structures that can be simple or branched. They range in colour from white to brownish-black. Many species within this genus develop soralia, structures that produce powdery reproductive propagules, on their upper surface. Physcia species can be distinguished and grouped into distinct taxa based on the position and shape of their soralia, which provides valuable characteristics for identification and classification.

The upper cortex—the protective outer layer of the thallus—is paraplectenchymatous, meaning it consists of tightly packed, roughly equal-sized cells. The lower cortex, in most instances, is prosoplectenchymatous—a tissue arrangement in which constituent fungal hyphae are aligned in a particular direction. The lower cortical layer is a layer that is usually 6–8 cells thick (about 20–30 μm) arranged in a periclinal fashion. Less frequently, Physcia species have been reported to have an anomalous "paraplectenchymatous" lower cortex. Two groups of these occur: those with a pale lower cortex (such as P. albata and P. halei); and those with a black lower cortex (such as P. crispa and P. sorediosa). Following detailed examination of various Physcia species through electron microscopy, Mason Hale discerned that the atypical lower cortex comprises two distinct layers. The basal layer is paraplectenchymatous, consisting of two to three cells in thickness, while the upper layer is prosoplectenchymatous and varies in thickness, occasionally blending seamlessly into the medulla. The photosynthetic partner in the lichen is trebouxioid—a type of green algae.

Reproductive structures (apothecia) are common; these are lecanorine in form, meaning they are disc-like and surrounded by a pale thalline margin. They can be directly attached to the thallus or borne on short stalks, without rhizines beneath them. The discs of these structures are typically brown to black, often with a white pruina, surrounded by a thalline margin. The tissue layers within, namely the hymenium and hypothecium, are colourless. The structural support within the hymenium consists of paraphyses, which are slender and may branch at their tips which are pale brown with a darker cap.

The reproductive spores, produced in structures called asci, are cylindrical to club-shaped, typically containing eight spores each. These spores are brown and have a single cross-wall (1-septate), enclosed by a thick wall. Another reproductive feature, conidiomata, are immersed structures that release asexual spores; these are visible as black dots on the surface of the lobes. The conidioma (asexual spores) are rod-shaped, colourless, and lack internal divisions (aseptate); they are 4–6 μm long. They are of the Physcia-type (having cells with thickened walls mainly at the ends and central septum, whose united lumina resemble a flask) or Pachysporaria-type (having rounded cells and thickened walls). Ascospore size is a relatively minor factor in distinguishing between Physcia species.

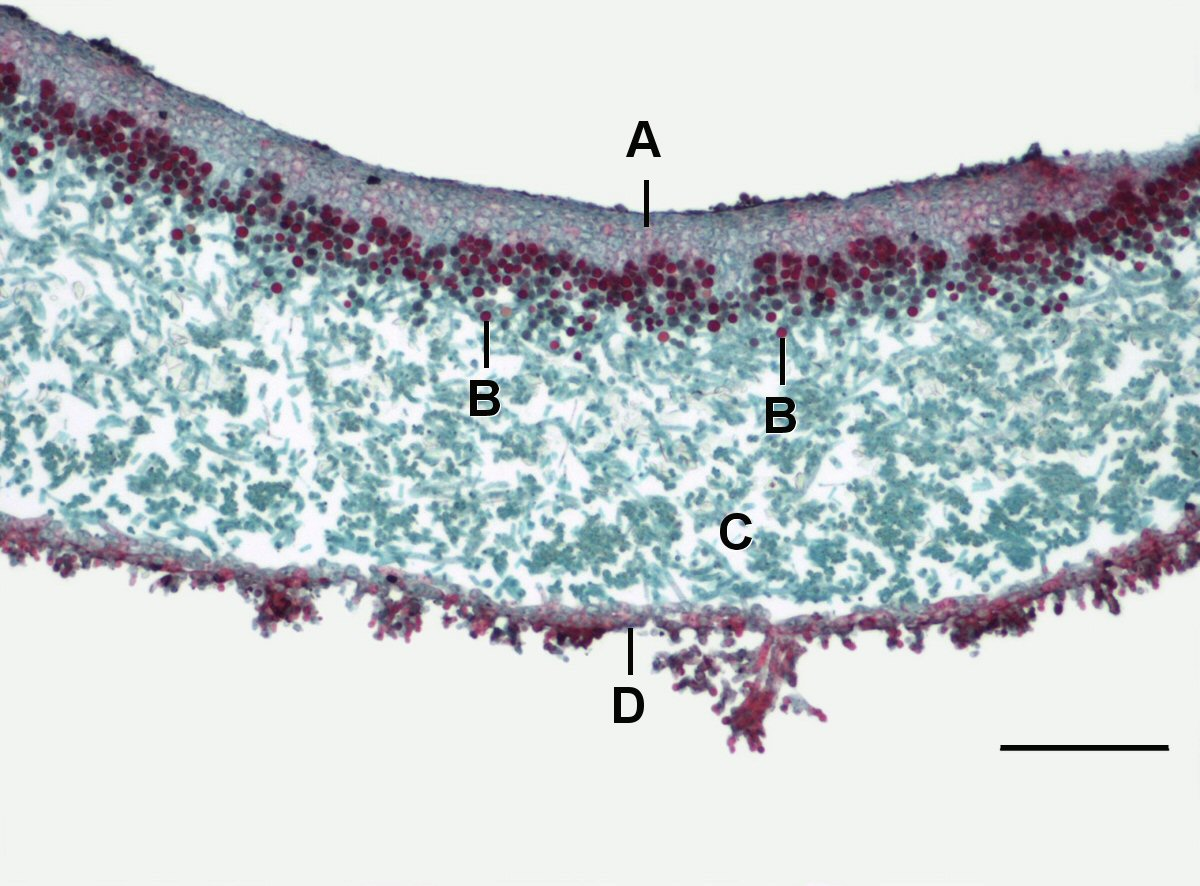
Light microscopy of a transverse section of a Physcia lobe. A=fungal layer (paraplectenchymatous upper cortex), B=algal cells, C=medulla, D=lower cortex. Scale bar=0.1 mm

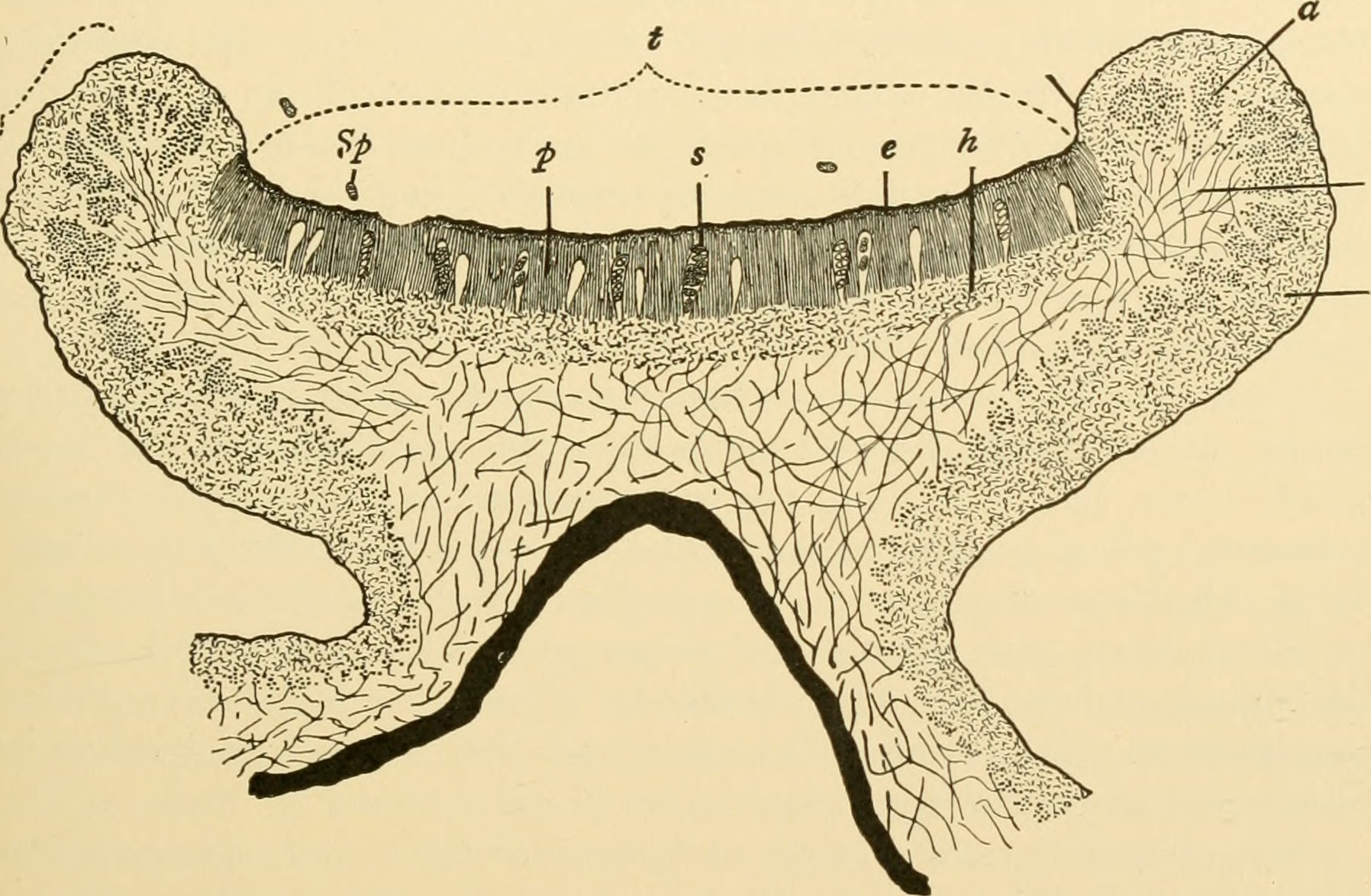
Section of the disc-like apothecium of Physcia pulverulenta. t=hymenium, sp=spore, s=asci, p=paraphyses, e=epithecium, h=hypothecium, pt=parathecium or excipulum, a=algal layer, m=medulla, r=cortex

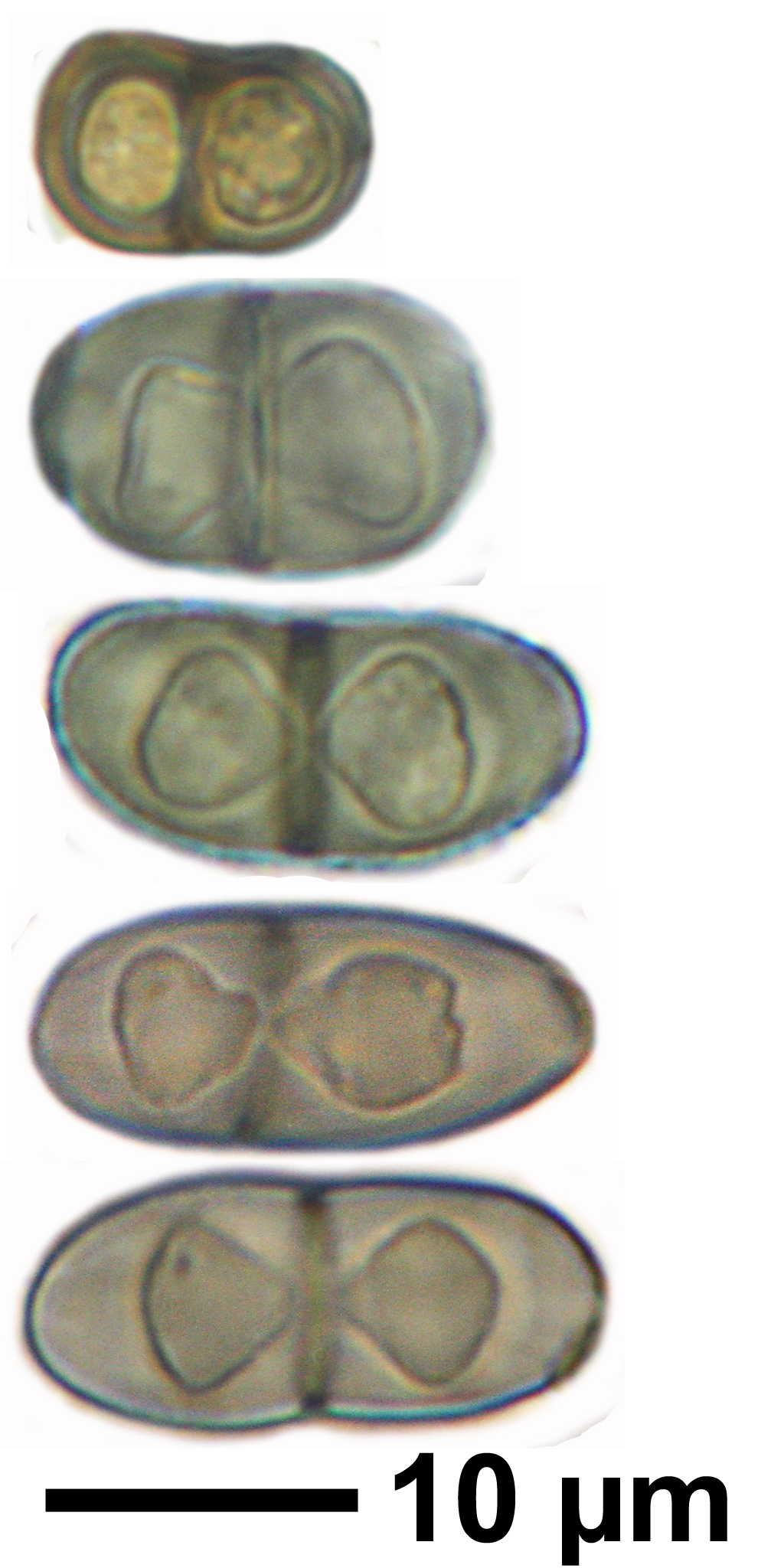
The ascospores of Physcia caesia are typical for the genus.

== Chemistry ==
Chemically, Physcia lichens often contain atranorin in their cortex, along with zeorin and other terpenoids. Several hopanoids (i.e., having the same core chemical structure as the compound hopane) have been identified from Physcia aipolia.

The chemical profile of Physcia mediterranea, a rare Mediterranean species, has been studied with advanced phytochemical techniques, revealing a complex mixture of bioactive compounds, including the discovery of a kaurene-skeleton diterpene, previously undetected in lichens. Additionally, analyses identified methylbenzoic acids like sparassol and atraric acid, along with a variety of aliphatic fatty acids, phenolic compounds, and depsides such as atranol and chloroatranol. Atranol, a depside known for its high biological activity, was prominently found in the wax fraction of the extracts. The presence of sesquiterpene lactones, diphenyl ethers, and triterpenes like muronic and ursolic acids further adds to its chemical diversity.

== Comparison with similar genera ==
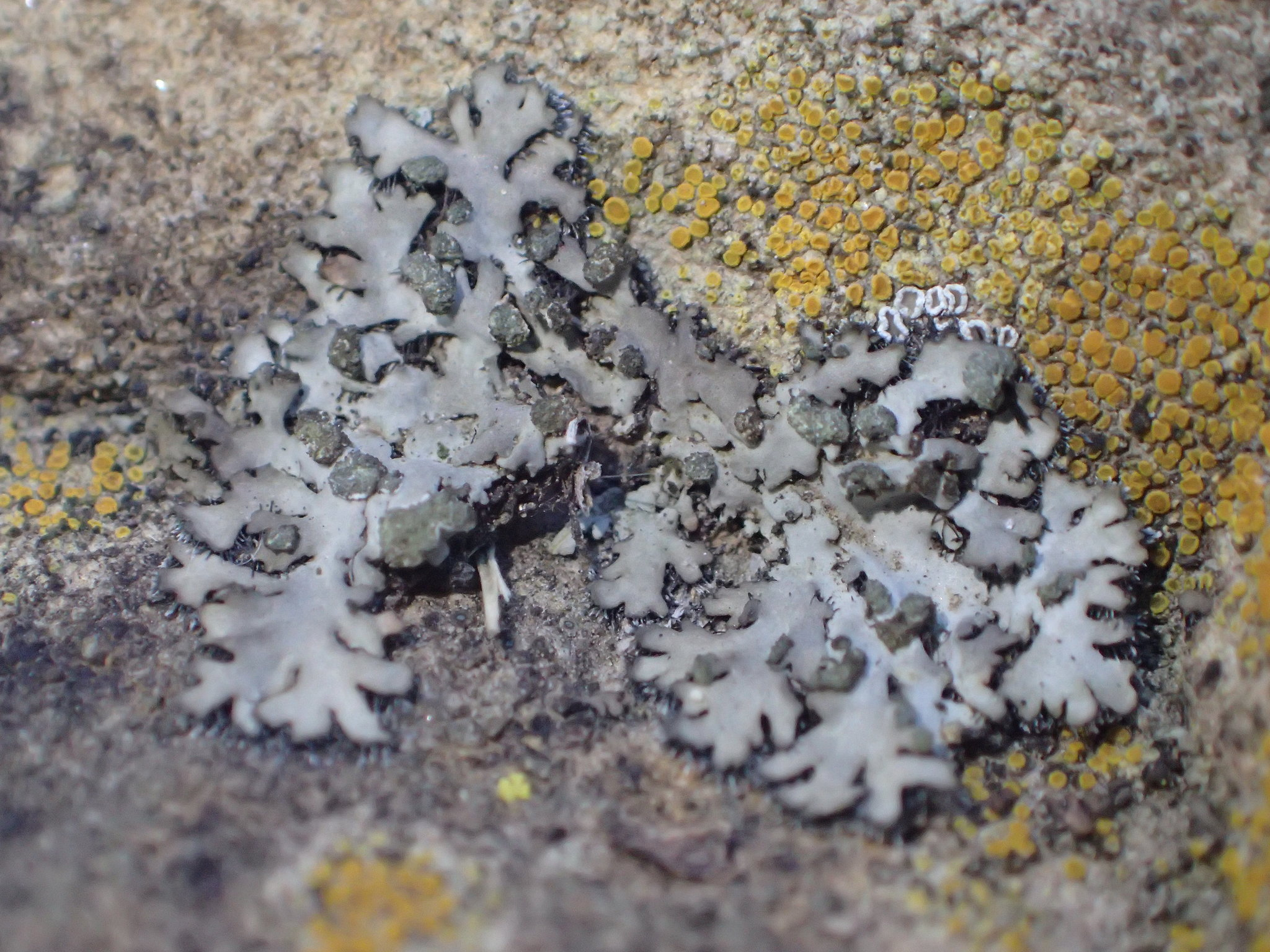
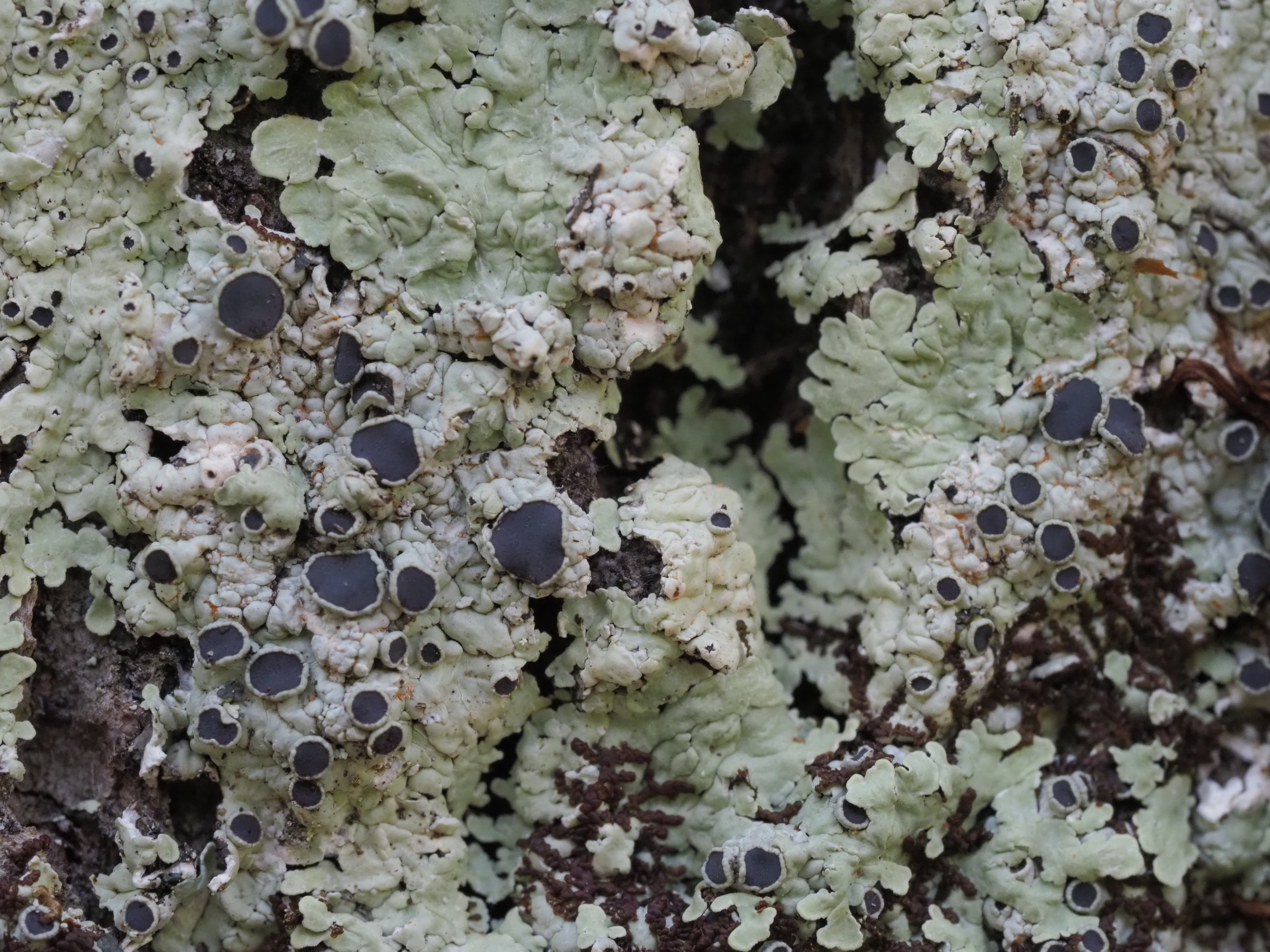
Phaeophyscia hirsuta (left) and Dirinaria confluens are two of many examples of species previously classified in Physcia.

Physcia distinguishes itself from similar genera such as Dirinaria, Heterodermia, Hyperphyscia, Phaeophyscia, and Pyxine through several distinctive features. Both the upper and lower cortex of Physcia are paraplectenchymatous, which is similar to most of the compared genera except Heterodermia, where the lower cortex is prosoplectenchymatous when present. A reliable characteristic of Physcia is the consistent presence of atranorin in the upper cortex, unlike Hyperphyscia where it is rarely present, and Phaeophyscia where it is absent.

The medulla in Physcia is typically white, akin to Hyperphyscia and Phaeophyscia, but can also be pigmented, which aligns more closely with Dirinaria and Pyxine. Pruina, or a powdery coating, is variably present or absent in Physcia, providing a surface feature that can aid in distinguishing it from Hyperphyscia where pruina is rare and Dirinaria where it is consistently absent.

In terms of reproductive structures, the apothecial algal layer in Physcia persists, similar to other compared genera except for Pyxine, where it is not persistent. The epithecium in Physcia reacts negatively to potassium hydroxide (K−), which is a common trait across all compared genera except for Pyxine, where it turns violet (K+ violet). The hypothesised colour of the hypothecium in Physcia ranges from colourless to yellowish, unlike the dark brown hypothesised seen in Dirinaria and Pyxine.

The ascosporic type and conidial morphology further support the unique positioning of Physcia among its peers. The ascosporic type mirrors that of Phaeophyscia, both of which differ significantly from the types found in Dirinaria and Pyxine. Conidial shapes in Physcia are bacilliform (rod-shaped) to bifusiform (elongated and tapering at both ends, with a narrow middle) or somewhat lageniform (flask-shaped), with sizes ranging from 4–6 μm, which provides a subtle but important distinction from the generally shorter conidia of Pyxine and the longer, filamentous conidia of Hyperphyscia.

The genus Kashiwadia is distinguished from Physcia by several key features: it has significantly narrower thalline lobes and both its upper and lower cortical layers are paraplectenchymatous. Additionally, Kashiwadia bears a closer phylogenetic resemblance to the members of the Heterodermia branch within the Physciaceae.

== Habitat and distribution ==
Species of the genus Physcia grow on bark, wood, and rock, often in environments rich in nutrients or those that have been enriched by human activity. In the UK, several species have rapidly adapted to urban areas that were once heavily polluted by SO_{2}. Similarly, Physcia tenella, a nitrophilous lichen, is reestablishing itself in its former habitats around Toruń, Poland, due to improvements in air quality resulting from reduced industrial emissions.

The genus has a widespread, cosmopolitan distribution. Several floristic works have investigated the occurrence of Physcia in specific regions. For example, Moberg identified 21 species in East Africa in 1986, while Swinscow and Krog reported 21 species in their 1988 study on East African lichens. Aptroot included 5 species in his 1987 work on the flora of Guyana, French Guiana, and Suriname. Moberg's 1990 study found 34 species in Central and South America, suggesting that the continent may be the centre of diversity for the genus.

In the Sonoran Desert and adjacent areas, Moberg discovered 25 species. As of 2023, 42 species have been recorded in North America.

Moberg reported 17 species in Australia in 2001, while Galloway and Moberg recognized 14 species in New Zealand in 2005. Elix recorded 31 species in 2009. Harada identified eight species in Japan in 2016. In 2007, Awasthi reported 18 species in the South Asian region encompassing India, Nepal, and Sri Lanka.

== Species interactions ==
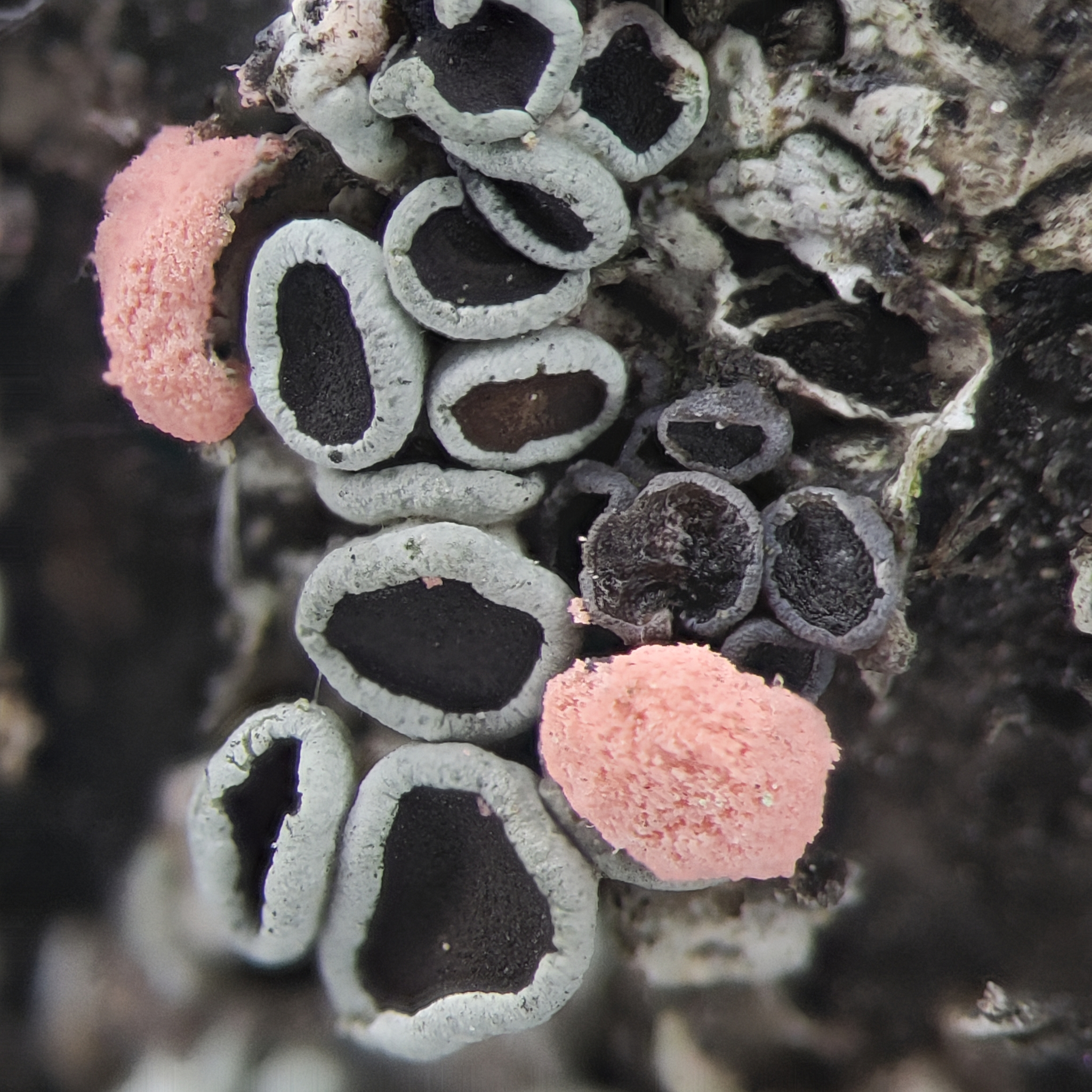
Illosporiopsis christiansenii

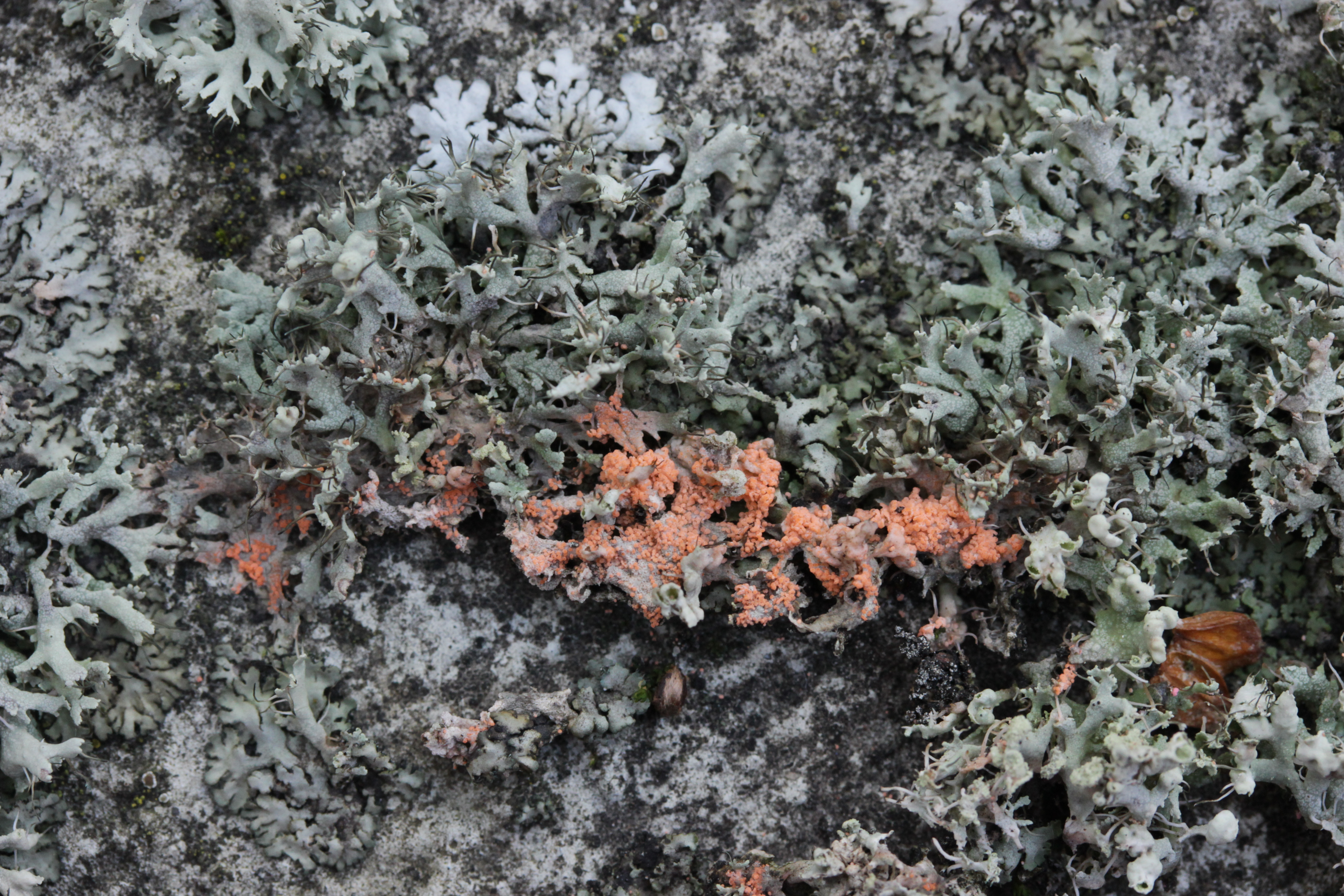
Erythricium aurantiacum

Numerous species of lichenicolous fungi are known to colonise Physcia species, and several of these fungi have species epithets that incorporate the host genus name, reflecting their specific ecological associations. These include: Bryostigma epiphyscium, Xanthoriicola physciae, Zwackhiomyces physciicola, Microsphaeropsis physciae, Didymocyrtis physciae, Lichenopeltella physciae, Nectriopsis physciicola, Lichenochora physciicola, Feltgeniomyces physciae, and Trichoconis physciicola. Josef Hafellner and Erich Zimmermann published a key to the lichenicolous fungi that invade Physcia species in a 2012 publication, in which they included 39 species.

Some infections by lichenicolous fungi result in characteristic physical symptoms that aid in identification. For example, infection by Syzygospora physciacearum results in the formations of galls, whereas others can be recognised by their discolouration: Marchandiomyces auranticus is orange, Illosporiopsis christiansenii is pink, while parasitism by Bryostigma epiphyscium creates tiny black spots.

The species Physcia adscendens is characterised by its long cilia, which have been observed to function akin to cladding on the exteriors of bird nests. These structures enhance the lichen's ability to adhere to surfaces, providing a velcro-like property that facilitates attachment.

== Species ==
Historically, many taxa have been assigned the generic name Physcia; Index Fungorum has records for more than 2000 taxa that have been assigned to that genus. Recent estimates of the number of species in the genus include about 50 (2001); 73 species (2008), and about 80 (2016 and 2022). As of April 2024, Species Fungorum (in the Catalogue of Life) accept 42 species of Physcia.

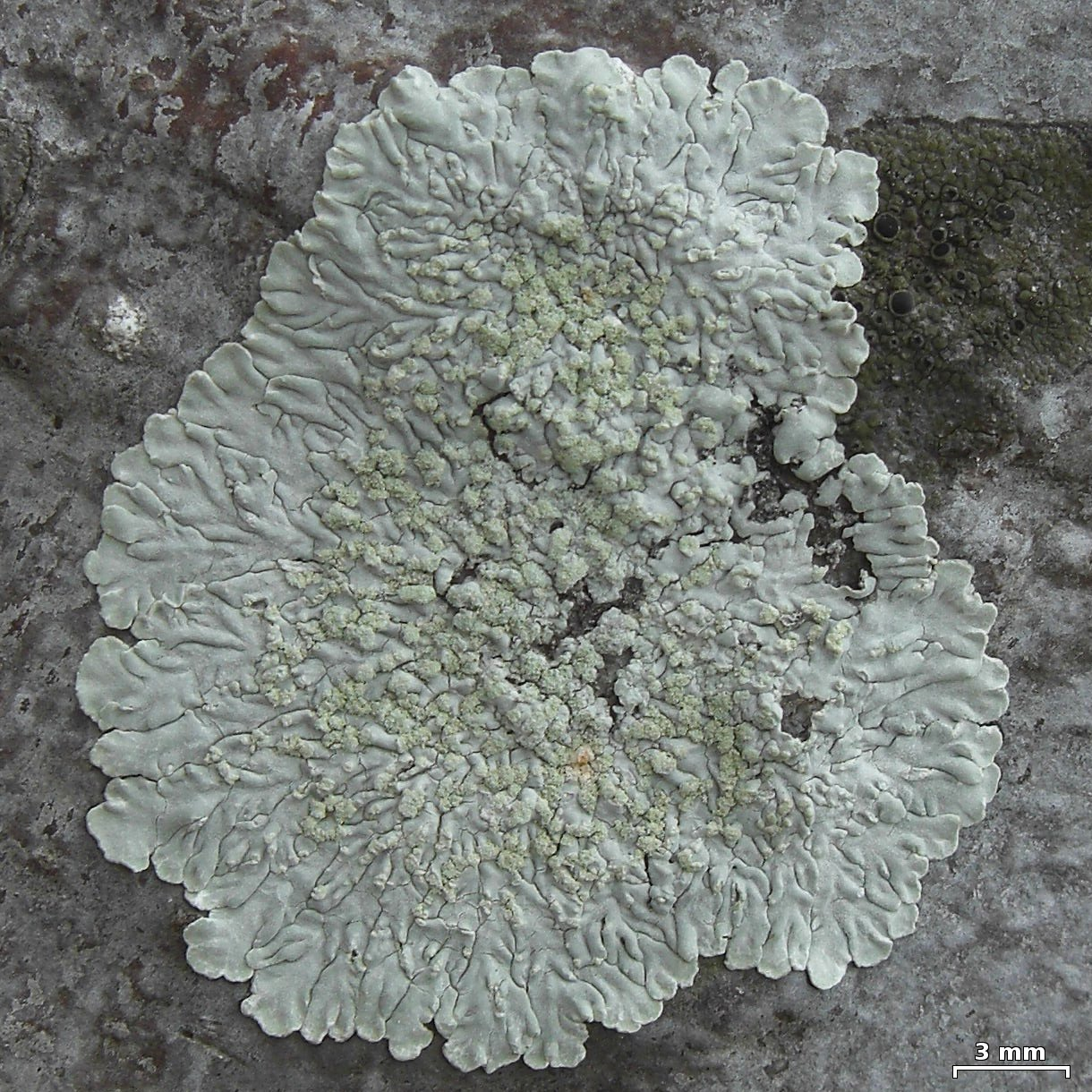
Physcia erumpens

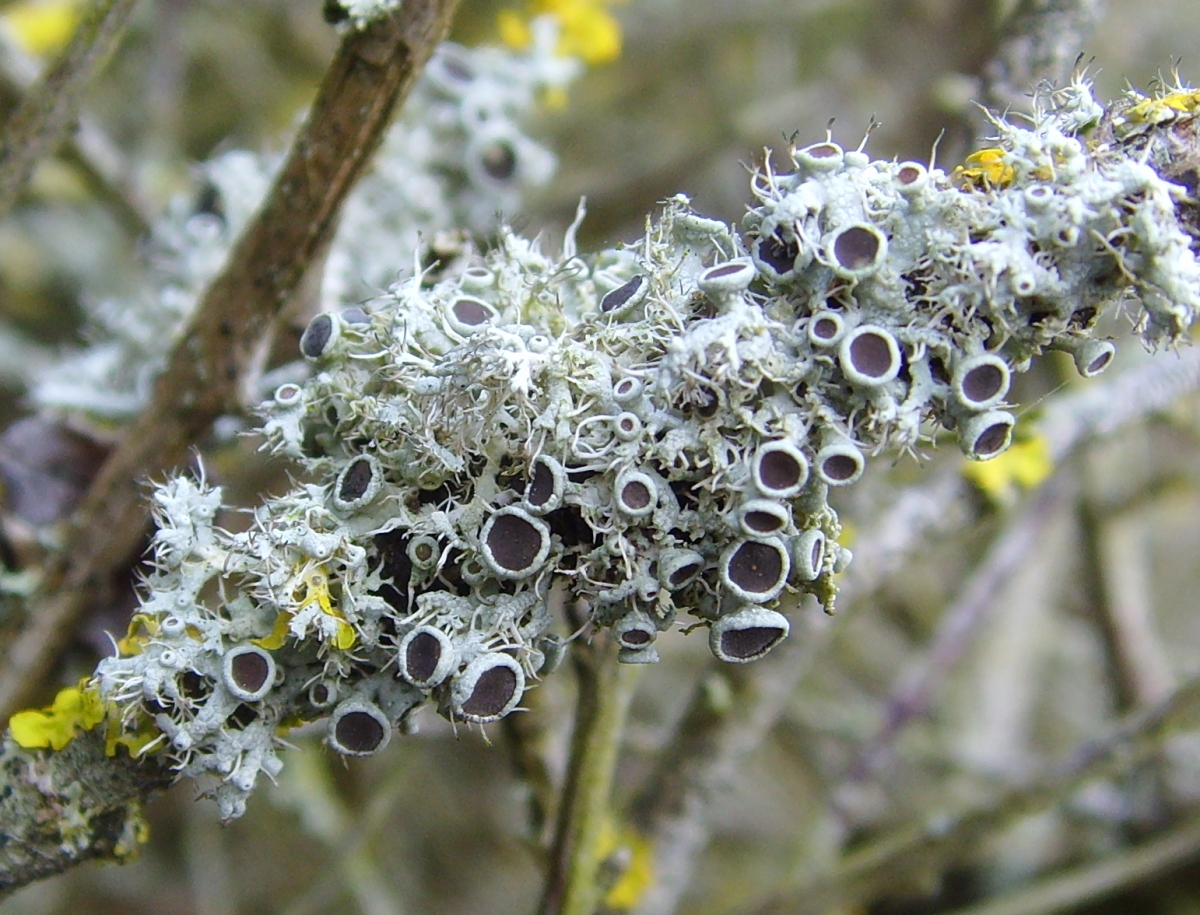
Physcia leptalea

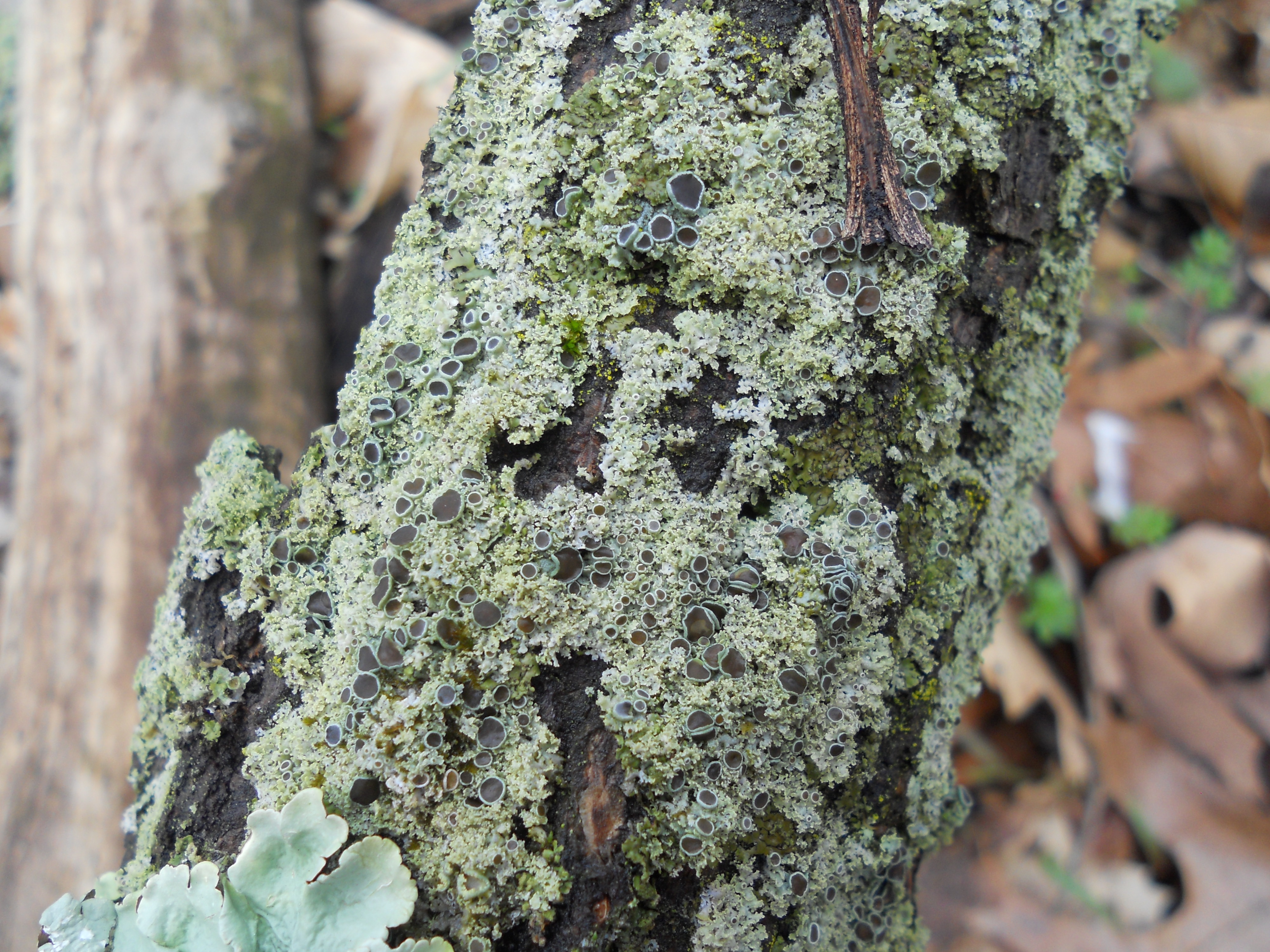
Physcia millegrana

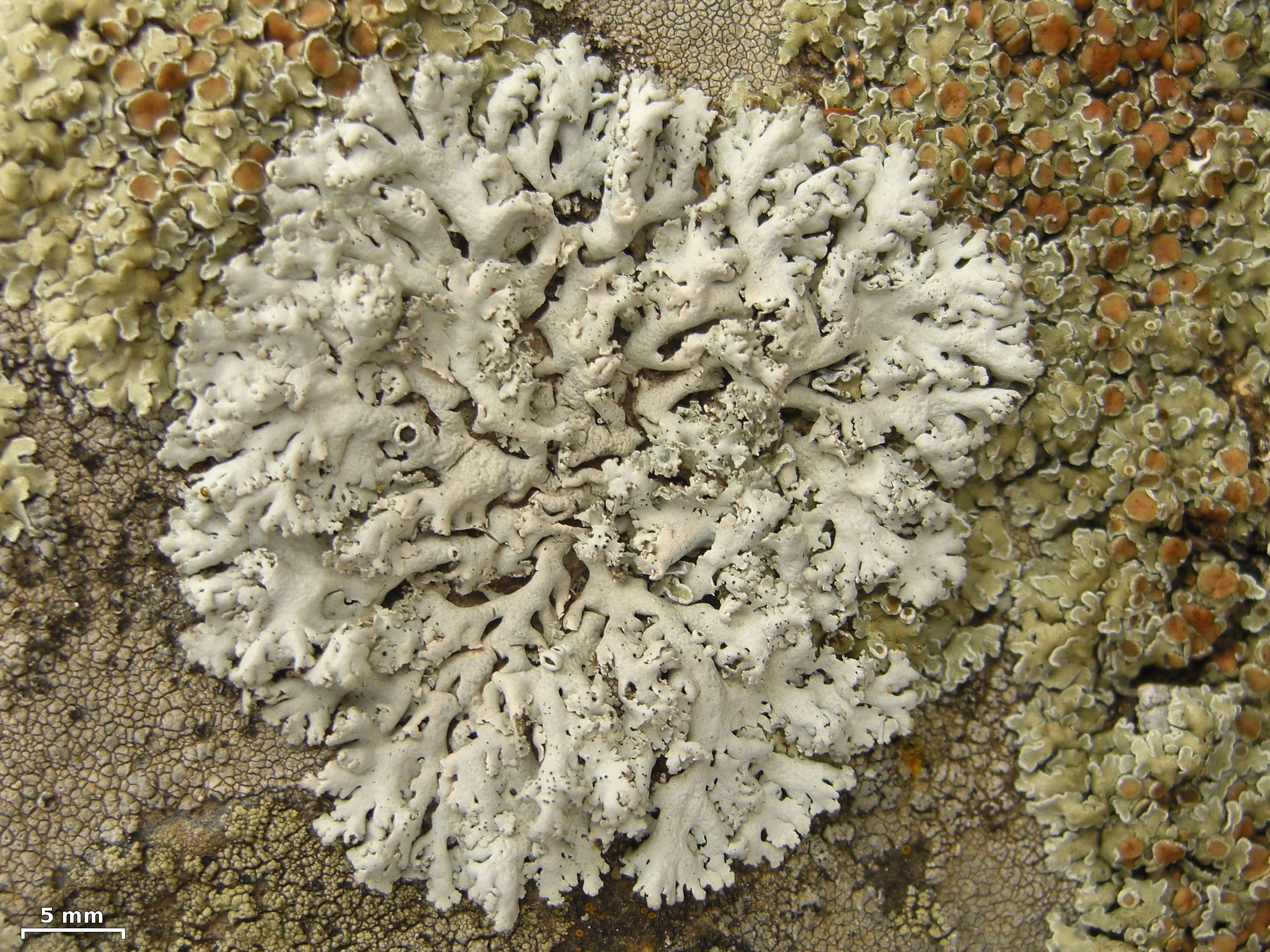
Physcia tribacia

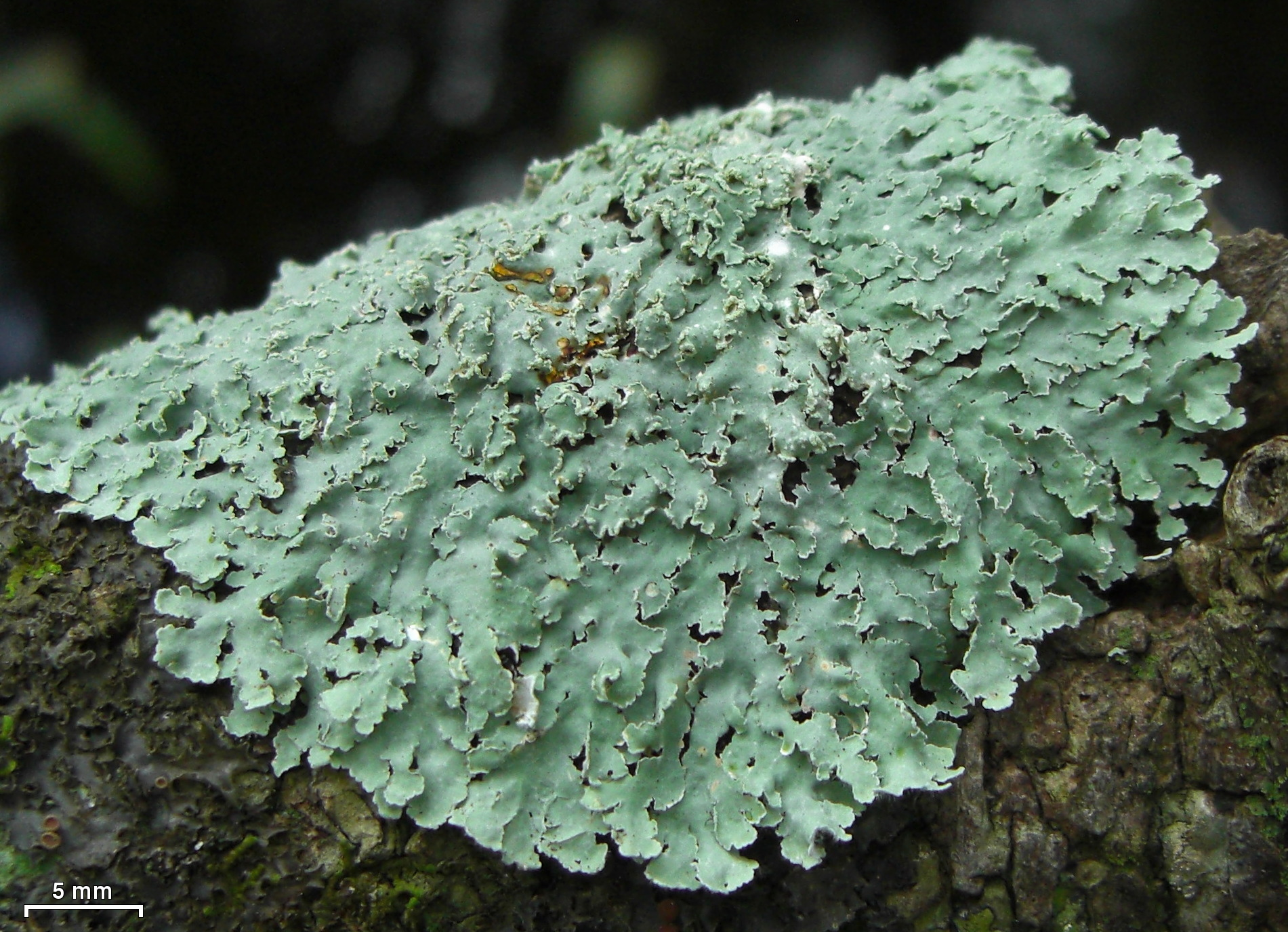
Physcia undulata

- Physcia abuensis D.D.Awasthi & S.R.Singh (1979) – Rajasthan, India
- Physcia adscendens H.Olivier (1882) – hooded rosette lichen; widespread distribution
- Physcia aipolia (Ehrh. ex Humb.) Fürnr. (1839) – hoary rosette lichen; widespread distribution
- Physcia aipolioides (Nádv.) Breuss & Türk (1998)
- Physcia alba (Fée) Müll.Arg. (1887) – South America
- Physcia albata (F.Wilson) Hale (1963) – Africa; Australia; Hawaii; New Zealand; South America
- Physcia albinea (Ach.) Malbr. (1868) – Asia; Europe; North America
- Physcia americana G.Merr. (1895) – powdery rosette lichen
- Physcia atrostriata Moberg (1986) – streaked rosette lichen; – Africa; Australia; New Zealand; South America
- Physcia austrocaesia Elix (2011) – Australia; New Zealand
- Physcia biziana (A.Massal.) Zahlbr. 1901) – frosted rosette lichen; – widespread distribution
- Physcia caesia (Hoffm.) Fürnr. (1839) – blue-grey rosette lichen, powderback lichen; widespread distribution
- Physcia caesiopsis Elix (2011) – Australia
- Physcia cinerea Moberg (1990) – Venezuela
- Physcia clementei (Ach.) J.Kickx f. (1867) – Australia; Europe; North America
- Physcia convexa Müll.Arg. (1888)
- Physcia convexella Moberg (1990) – Peru
- Physcia coronifera Moberg (1990) – Ecuador
- Physcia crispa Nyl. (1860) – Africa; Australia; North America; South America; South Pacific
- Physcia dactylifera Elix (2011) – Africa; Australia; Central America; South America
- Physcia dakotensis Essl. (2004) – South Dakota, United States
- Physcia decorticata Moberg (1990) – Africa; Australia; Central America; South America
- Physcia dilatata Nyl. (1860) – Africa
- Physcia dimidiata (Arnold) Nyl. (1881)
- Physcia dubia (Hoffm.) Lettau (1912) – powder-tipped rosette lichen; – widespread distribution
- Physcia erumpens Moberg (1986) – Australia; Africa; Europe; Macaronesia; New Zealand; North America; South America
- Physcia fragilescens Zahlbr. (1928) – Asia
- Physcia gomukhensis D.D.Awasthi & S.R.Singh (1978) – Uttar Pradesh, India
- Physcia halei J.W.Thomson (1963) – granite rosette lichen
- Physcia integrata (Nyl.) Arnold (1884) – Africa; Australia; North America; South America; Christmas Island (Indian Ocean)
- Physcia kalbii Moberg (1990) – Brazil
- Physcia kantvilasii Elix (2011) – Tasmania
- Physcia krogiae Moberg (1986) – Australia; Africa; Central America; South America
- Physcia leptalea (Ach.) DC. (1805)
- Physcia lopezii Moberg (1990) – Venezuela
- Physcia macquariensis C.W.Dodge (1968)
- Physcia magnussonii Frey (1952) – Europe
- Physcia manuelii Moberg (1990) – Venezuela
- Physcia mediterranea Nimis (2016) – Europe
- Physcia microphylla Aptroot & M.F.Souza (2020) – Brazil
- Physcia millegrana Degel. (1940) – mealy rosette lichen; North America
- Physcia nashii Moberg (1997) – Mexico
- Physcia neogaea R.C.Harris (1990) – dwarf rosette lichen; Florida, United States
- Physcia neonubila Elix (2011) – Australia
- Physcia occidentalis Essl. & McCune (2020) – North America
- Physcia ornamentalis R.Miranda, Campos-Cerda & Herrera-Camp (2025) – Mexico
- Physcia phaea (Tuck. ex E.Michener) J.W.Thomson (1963) – black-eyed rosette lichen; Asia; Europe; North America
- Physcia phaeocarpa (Nyl.) Mull.Arg. (1889) – Australia; South America
- Physcia poncinsii Hue (1916) – Australia; Africa; North America; South America; New Zealand; Norfolk Island
- Physcia pseudospeciosa J.W.Thomson (1963)
- Physcia pumilior R.C.Harris (1990) – spotted rosette lichen; United States
- Physcia rhizinata Essl. & McCune (2020) – California, United States
- Physcia rolandii Elix (2011) – Australia
- Physcia rolfii Moberg (1990) – Australia; South America
- Physcia semipinnata (Leers ex J.F.Gmel.) Moberg (1977) – Europe; North America
- Physcia sinuosa Moberg (1990) – Brazil
- Physcia sorediiconvexa Aptroot & Cáceres (2018) – Brazil
- Physcia sorediosa (Vain.) Lynge (1924) – black-bottomed rosette lichen; – Asia; Australia; Central America; North America; South America; Seychelles
- Physcia stellaris (L.) Nyl. (1853) – star rosette lichen; widespread distribution
- Physcia subtilis Degel. (1941) – slender rosette lichen
- Physcia tenella (Scop.) DC. (1805) – fringed rosette lichen; – Africa; Asia; Europe; North America; Oceania
- Physcia tenellula Moberg (1997) – Mexico
- Physcia tenuis Moberg (1990) – Brazil
- Physcia thomsoniana Essl. (2017) – North America
- Physcia tretiachii Moberg (1997) – Mexico
- Physcia tribacia (Ach.) Nyl. (1874) – Africa; Asia; Australia; Europe; Macaronesia; New Zealand; North America; South America
- Physcia tribacioides Nyl. (1874) – Africa; Asia; Australia; Europe; New Zealand
- Physcia ucrainica S.Y.Kondr., Lőkös & Hur (2015) – Ukraine
- Physcia undulata Moberg (1986) – Africa; Australia; Central America; New Zealand; South America; Christmas Island (Indian Ocean)
- Physcia verdonii Elix (2011) – Australia
- Physcia verrucosa Moberg (1986) – Africa; Australia
- Physcia villosula Moberg (1997) – Mexico
- Physcia vitii Nádv. (1947)

== Biomonitoring ==
The genus Physcia, including specific species such as Physcia adscendens, serves as a highly sensitive bioindicator for nitrogen pollution, which is a critical and escalating issue in tropical regions where bioindicator development is challenged by gaps in taxonomic and ecological knowledge. Utilising characteristics derived from studies in Europe and North America, traits and taxonomy of Physcia species can be effectively adapted for monitoring nitrogen levels in tropical ecosystems, thereby supporting environmental management and conservation initiatives.

Sigal and Nash established a classification system based on the sensitivity of over 20 lichen species to air pollutants, noting that highly pollution-tolerant species such as Physcia biziana and Physcia tenella were frequently observed in the Los Angeles area without any morphological changes, despite significant environmental degradation. In contrast, very sensitive species had vanished from the region, and others like Usnea spp. were found only in minimal amounts, indicating a marked decline since the turn of the century.

In one study on air quality monitoring in the tropics, Physcia was identified as prevalent in urban environments with poor air quality, particularly high levels of nitrogen dioxide (NO_{2}) and sulfur dioxide (SO_{2}). This prevalence is attributed to its tolerance to pollution, where unlike more sensitive species, Physcia does not die off but thrives, thereby serving as a reliable bioindicator for monitoring long-term air quality in urban settings. This capability highlights its potential for inclusion in air quality assessment frameworks, especially beneficial in regions with limited air quality monitoring infrastructure.

In laboratory experiments, Physcia tribacia has shown the ability to clean water by removing antimony trioxide, a toxic substance. This process is most efficient under specific conditions and naturally occurs in a way that spontaneously releases heat, suggesting it could be a cost-effective and eco-friendly option for or the removal of metal pollution.
