= Physcia ucrainica =

Scientific classification
- Kingdom: Fungi
- Division: Ascomycota
- Class: Lecanoromycetes
- Order: Caliciales
- Family: Physciaceae
- Genus: Physcia
- Species: P. ucrainica

Binomial name
- Physcia ucrainica Kondratyuk, Lőkös & J.-S.Hur (2015)
- Holotype: Novyi Svit botanical reserve, Crimea, Ukraine

Species of lichen

Physcia ucrainica is a species of foliose lichen in the family Physciaceae, described from the Crimean Peninsula. It occupies a transitional phylogenetic position related closely to both the Physcia adscendens and Physcia stellaris groups.

== Taxonomy and naming ==
Physcia ucrainica was formally described as a new species in 2015 by the lichenologists Sergey Kondratyuk, László Lőkös, and Jae-Seoun Hur. The specific epithet ucrainica refers to its type locality in Ukraine. Molecular analysis indicates that Physcia biziana and Physcia orientostellaris are closely related within the genus Physcia, forming a clade with P. ucrainica as their sister taxon.

== Description ==
Physcia ucrainica is distinguished by its rosette-like thallus which forms long and narrow lobes that are only horizontally oriented. Unlike Physcia adscendens, it lacks ascending, helmet-shaped lobes and instead features well-developed, laminal, crater-like soralia mainly in the centre of the thallus. These soralia are unique in that they burst through the lichen's upper surface. The lichen is greyish white to dirty grey overall, with a darker grey centre where older soralia are located. The lobes have visible rhizines and cilia, contributing to its distinctive morphology.

An unusual form of the common Physcia adscendens is found in Greece, in which the soralia occur mainly scattered on the thallus surface, where they cause perforations of the thallus lobes. The resultant morphology was noted to be similar to that of Physcia ucrainica, although molecular phylogenetics analysis of the internal transcribed spacer DNA sequences of these taxa suggest that they are independent lineages.

== Habitat and distribution ==
This species is commonly found on horizontally oriented branches of Juniperus excelsa within Juniper forests of the "Novy Svit" Botanical Reserve near Sudak, Crimea. It thrives in Mediterranean Juniperus-Quercus forests, often in association with species like Catapyrenium psoroideum and various other Mediterranean-Atlantic lichens. Physcia ucrainica is known primarily from its type locality in Crimea, where it can be locally abundant.
