= Physcia neonubila =

Scientific classification
- Kingdom: Fungi
- Division: Ascomycota
- Class: Lecanoromycetes
- Order: Caliciales
- Family: Physciaceae
- Genus: Physcia
- Species: P. neonubila

Binomial name
- Physcia neonubila Elix (2011)
- Holotype: Molonglo Gorge Forest Park, Australia

Species of lichen

Physcia neonubila is a species of foliose lichen in the family Physciaceae. It was first described in 2008 from specimens collected in the Australian Capital Territory. This species is noted for its superficial resemblance to Physcia nubila but is distinguished by its narrower lobes, shiny tips, spotted surfaces, and unique chemical markers.

== Taxonomy ==
Physcia neonubila was scientifically described by John Elix based on a specimen collected from the Molonglo Gorge Forest Park (near Canberra) at an elevation of 650 m (2,130 ft); there, it was found growing on Melaleuca shrubs along a riverbank. The species is differentiated from Physcia nubila by features such as narrower lobes and a distinct chemosyndrome involving secondary metabolites such as 6a-acetoxy-22-hydroxyhopane-25-oic acid and 6a,22-dihydroxyhopane-25-oic acid.

== Description ==
The thallus of Physcia neonubila is orbicular or irregularly spreading and adheres closely to the substrate, measuring 1–6 cm in width. The lobes are thin, 0.5−1.5 mm wide, and arranged closely or slightly overlapping. They are irregularly branched, weakly concave to flat, with delicately scalloped, notched, or incised margins. The tips of the lobes are flat and become powdery (erose-sorediate) towards the inner parts. The upper surface is white to dark grey, typically matt or minutely roughened, and characteristically spotted. The lower surface is creamish white to pale buff with a narrow, darker marginal zone and smooth. Rhizines (root-like attachechment structures) are scattered, more sparse at the margins and denser centrally, simple with a squarrose tuft at the tip.

Reproductive structures are rarely seen, with apothecia being very rare, laminal, and sessile. The disc is concave to flat, dark brown to black, and matt, sometimes with a grey-white powdery covering. Ascospores are broadly ellipsoid, typically measuring 20–23 by 8–10.5 μm.

== Chemistry ==
The cortex and medulla react positively to a potassium hydroxide (K+) test, turning yellow. Chemical analysis reveals the presence of atranorin and zeorin as major secondary metabolites, with various hopane-related compounds also identified.

== Habitat and distribution ==
Physcia neonubila occurs in southern Australia, commonly on the bark of trees and occasionally on rocks and wood in cooler temperate areas. It often grows in close association with various species of lichen, including Buellia diss, Flavoparmelia rutidota, and Parmotrema reticulatum.
