= Physcia caesiopsis =

Scientific classification
- Kingdom: Fungi
- Division: Ascomycota
- Class: Lecanoromycetes
- Order: Caliciales
- Family: Physciaceae
- Genus: Physcia
- Species: P. caesiopsis

Binomial name
- Physcia caesiopsis Elix (2011)
- Holotype: First Moonbi Lookout, New South Wales, Australia

Species of lichen

Physcia caesiopsis is a species of foliose lichen in the family Physciaceae. Found in Australia, it was identified as a species new to science in 2011. The lichen is noted for its superficial resemblance to the widespread Physcia caesia, differentiated by its broader lobes and unique chemosyndrome involving 20a-acetoxyhopane-6a,22-diol.

== Taxonomy ==
Physcia caesiopsis was described by John Elix based on a specimen collected from the First Moonbi Lookout in New South Wales, Australia. It is differentiated from its close relatives like Physcia caesia by its broader lobes and distinct chemical markers such as 20a-acetoxyhopane-6a,22-diol, which are absent in Physcia caesia. The specific epithet caesiopsis is derived from the Greek suffix '-opsis', meaning resembling, indicating its resemblance to Physcia caesia.

== Description ==
The thallus of Physcia caesiopsis is orbicular or spreading, tightly adhered to the substrate or slightly loose at the margins, and up to 3 cm wide. The lobes comprising the thallus are 0.5−2.5 mm wide, lying flat or slightly overlapping, and exhibit either irregular or feather-like (pinnate) branching. They are mildly to distinctly convex with smooth edges and rounded to shallowly notched tips. The upper surface ranges from whitish grey to grey or brownish grey, features powdery reproductive propagules (soredia), and is marked with distinct, somewhat raised white spots, occasionally showing a grey-white powdery coating (pruina) at the tips. Soralia, the structures containing soredia, are found on the main body (laminal) or rarely along the edges (marginal), shaped like small craters or rounded caps, and measure 0.3−1.0 mm across. The lower surface is off-white to pale grey, with simple rhizines (root-like structures) that are scattered, measuring 0.2−0.9 mm in length. Reproductive structures such as apothecia (disc-like structures bearing spores) have not been observed to occur in this species.

== Habitat and distribution ==
At the time of its original publication, Physcia caesiopsis was only known from its type locality in montane areas of northern New South Wales, Australia. It typically grows on granite rocks in remnant Eucalyptus woodlands alongside other lichen species such as Buellia homophylia, Parmotrema reticulatum, and Xanthoparmelia species.
