= Xanthoparmelia nomosa =

Scientific classification
- Kingdom: Fungi
- Division: Ascomycota
- Class: Lecanoromycetes
- Order: Lecanorales
- Family: Parmeliaceae
- Genus: Xanthoparmelia
- Species: X. nomosa

Binomial name
- Xanthoparmelia nomosa Elix & Kantvilas (2009)
- Holotype site: Slaves Bay, Tasmania

Species of lichen

Xanthoparmelia nomosa is a species of saxicolous (rock-dwelling), foliose lichen in the family Parmeliaceae. It is found in Tasmania, Australia.

== Taxonomy ==
The lichen was formally described by lichenologist John Alan Elix and Gintaras Kantvilas in 2009. The species epithet, derived from the Greek νομός (meaning "pasture"), refers to the lichen's habitat.

== Description ==
Distinguishing features of Xanthoparmelia nomosa include its narrow, more or less straight lobes with a black lower surface, the occurrence of both isidia and lobules on the thallus surface, and the orange pigmentation of the lower medulla. It lacks apothecia and pycnidia. Its thallus grow 3–5 cm wide and is yellowish-green, although it darkens with age. The isidia are initial more or less spherical, later becoming cylindrical and then coralloid with blackened tips, measuring 0.5–1.0 mm high and 0.1–0.15 mm wide. Usnic acid, norstictic acid, and skyrin are lichen products found in X. nomosa. The results of standard chemical spot test are K− in the cortex, K+ (yellow then red), C−, and P+ (orange) in the upper medulla, and K+ (purple) in the lower medulla.

== Habitat and distribution ==
Xanthoparmelia nomosa is known to occur only at the type locality, growing on quartzite in a coastal paddock. Other lichens that are often are found nearby include Parmelia signifera, Parmotrema ceratum, P. reticulatum, and other Xanthoparmelia species such as X. australasica and X. subprolixa.

== See also ==
- List of Xanthoparmelia species
