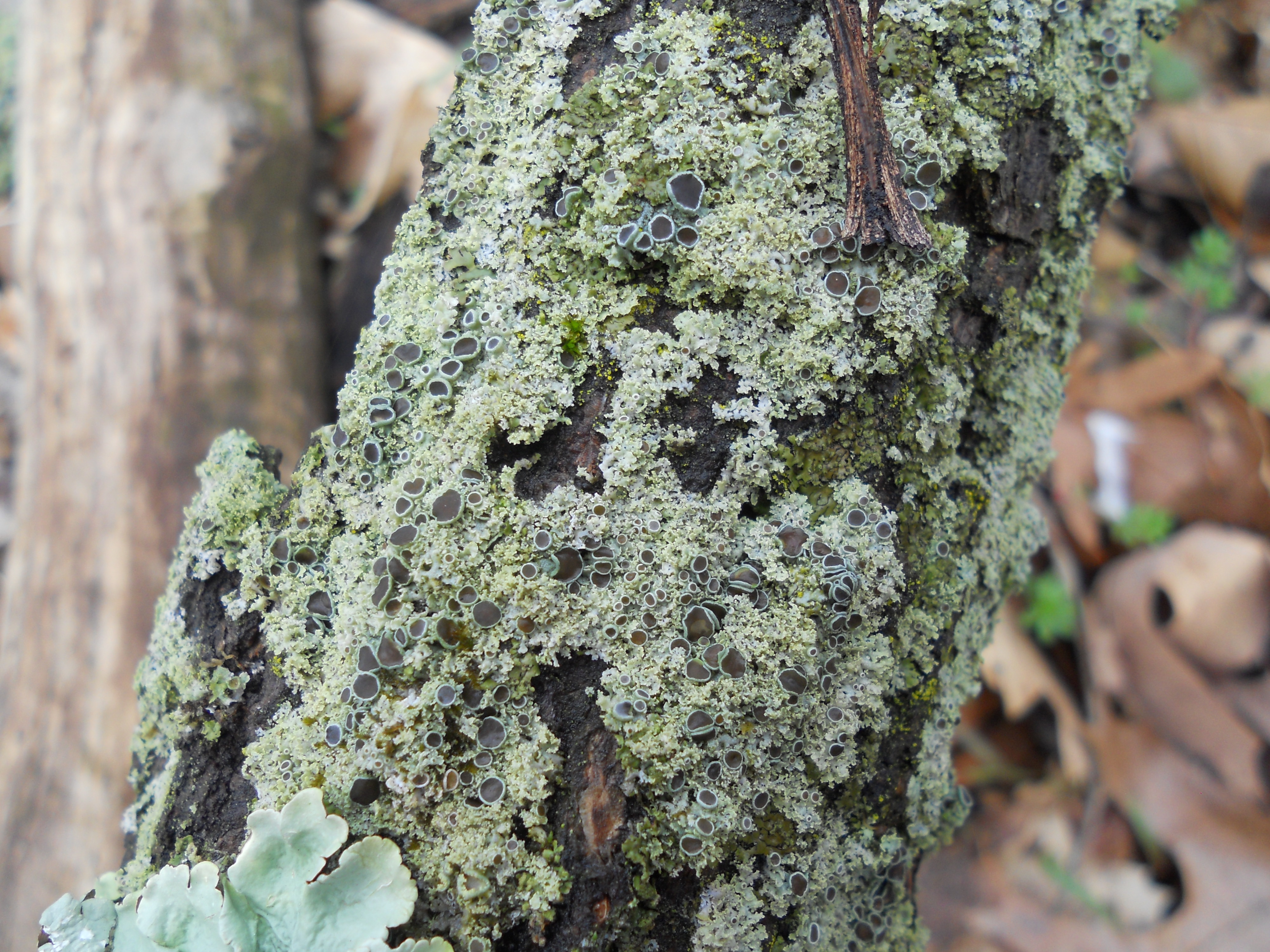

Conservation status
- Secure (NatureServe)

Scientific classification
- Kingdom: Fungi
- Division: Ascomycota
- Class: Lecanoromycetes
- Order: Caliciales
- Family: Physciaceae
- Genus: Physcia
- Species: P. millegrana

Binomial name
- Physcia millegrana Degel. (1940)

= Physcia millegrana =

Species of lichen

Physcia millegrana, commonly known as the mealy rosette lichen, is a species of corticolous (bark-dwelling), foliose lichen in the family Physciaceae. It is common in the eastern United States. It was formally described as a new species in 1940 by the lichenologist Gunnar Degelius. This gray lichen with a pale underside is characterized by its coarse soredia (granular vegetative propagules) that are densely distributed the margins of lobes, giving them a somewhat ruffled appearance.

Secondary metabolites (lichen products) found in Physcia millegrana include atraric acid, methyl 3-hydroxy orsellinate, and divaricatic acid.
