= Physcia austrocaesia =

Scientific classification
- Kingdom: Fungi
- Division: Ascomycota
- Class: Lecanoromycetes
- Order: Caliciales
- Family: Physciaceae
- Genus: Physcia
- Species: P. austrocaesia

Binomial name
- Physcia austrocaesia Elix (2011)
- Holotype: Molonglo Gorge Forest Park, Australia

Species of lichen

Physcia austrocaesia is a species of foliose lichen in the family Physciaceae. First described as a new species in 2011, it is found in Australia and New Zealand, where it grows on both on bark and on rocks. This species is closely related to the widespread Physcia caesia, but it can be distinguished by its broader lobes and the presence of aipolic acid, an uncommon secondary metabolite.

== Taxonomy ==
Physcia austrocaesia was scientifically described by John Elix in 2011. He collected the type specimen from Molonglo Gorge Forest Park (Australian Capital Territory) at an elevation of 650 m (2,130 ft), where it was growing along a riverbank on a moist sandstone ledge. It differs from Physcia caesia by having broader lobes and containing the aipolic acid chemosyndrome. The specific epithet austrocaesia refers to its resemblance to P. caesia and indicates its presence in the Southern Hemisphere, particularly Australia.

== Description ==
The thallus of Physcia austrocaesia is orbicular or spreading, closely attached or somewhat loosely attached at the margins, measuring 1–6 cm wide. Its lobes are typically 0.5–2.0 (up to 2.5) mm wide, contiguous, overlapping or occasionally separate, and feature irregular or pinnately branched, weakly to distinctly convex structures. The upper surface is light to medium or bluish grey, sorediate, and distinctively white-maculate (spotted) with somewhat raised spots (maculae), occasionally showing grey-white pruina at the tips. The lower surface ranges from off-white to pale brown or brown at the centre. Rhizines (root-like attachment structures) are simple or fasciculate (bundled) at the tips, varying from sparse at the edges to densely crowded and entangled centrally. They are coloured whitish, grey to brown, and measure 0.4−0.9 mm long.

== Habitat and distribution ==
Physcia austrocaesia is found in southern Australia and New Zealand. It typically grows on moist sandstone ledges along river banks within dry Eucalyptus-Callitris woodlands, adorned with numerous rock outcrops. This species is common in cool-temperate areas on rocks and occasionally on twigs. It is commonly found growing alongside other lichens including Buellia homophylia, B. procellarum, Lecanora pseudistera, Lecidea capensis, Parmotrema reticulatum, Ramboldia pertraeoides, Relicina sydneyensis, Rhizocarpon badioatrum, and various Xanthoparmelia species.
