= Physcia rhizinata =

Scientific classification
- Kingdom: Fungi
- Division: Ascomycota
- Class: Lecanoromycetes
- Order: Caliciales
- Family: Physciaceae
- Genus: Physcia
- Species: P. rhizinata

Binomial name
- Physcia rhizinata Essl. & McCune (2020)

Species of lichen

Physcia rhizinata is a species of corticolous (bark-dwelling), lichenized fungus in the family Physciaceae. It is a "typically fertile species lacking asexual propagules" commonly mistaken for P. stellaris due to their physical similarities. It has a close evolutionary relationship with P. occidentalis despite being morphologically dissimilar.

Physcia rhizinata is only known to be found in California. At least one specimen has been located in a canyon of the South Cow Mountain OHV Management Area owned by the Bureau of Land Management in a canyon live oak forest.
