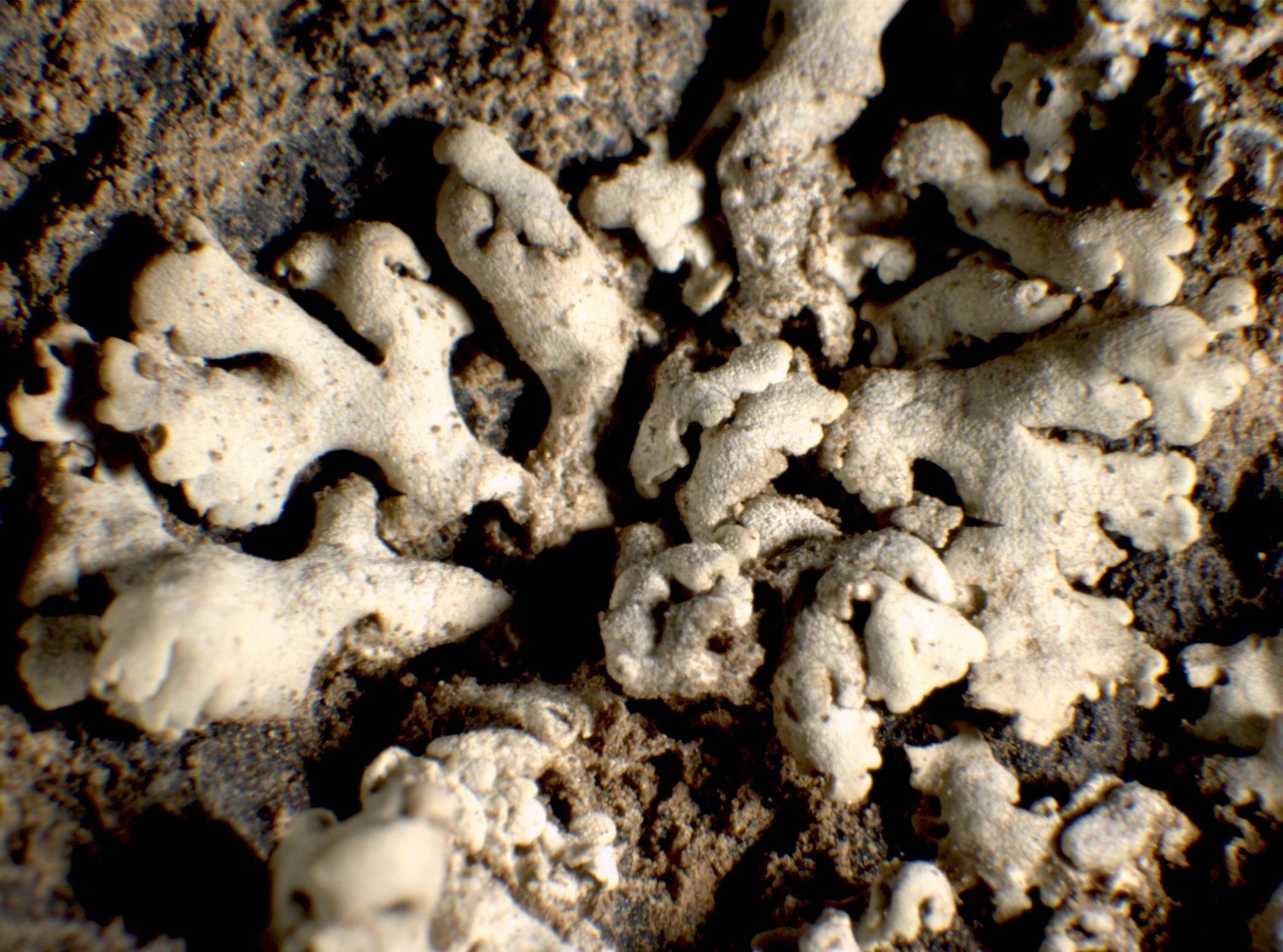

Conservation status
- Vulnerable (NatureServe)

Scientific classification
- Kingdom: Fungi
- Division: Ascomycota
- Class: Lecanoromycetes
- Order: Caliciales
- Family: Physciaceae
- Genus: Physcia
- Species: P. magnussonii

Binomial name
- Physcia magnussonii Frey (1952)

Synonyms
- Physcia stellaris var. subincisa Th.Fr. (1871); Physcia aipolia var. subincisa (Th.Fr.) Lynge (1916)

= Physcia magnussonii =

Species of lichen

Physcia magnussonii is a species of saxicolous (rock-dwelling), foliose lichen in the family Physciaceae. It was formally described as a new species in 1952 by the Swiss botanist Eduard Frey. He collected the type specimen in Bern, Switzerland. The species epithet honours the Swedish lichenologist Adolf Hugo Magnusson. Frey's original specimen was later declared the lectotype of the species by Roland Moberg in a 1977 monograph on the genus Physcia.

Physcia magnussonii has a heteromerous and dorsiventral thallus with narrow lobes that form tightly packed, circular rosettes. The lichen produces apothecia (fruiting bodies) with club-shaped asci containing eight ascospores, and also produces pycnidia with asexual conidia, with chemical properties including the presence of atranorin.

== Description ==
Physcia magnussonii is a foliose lichen, meaning it has a leaf-like structure. The thallus—the main body of the lichen—is heteromerous and dorsiventral, with narrow lobes that are closely pressed against the substrate. These lobes form tightly packed, circular rosettes that can reach up to 8 cm (3.1 in) in diameter. The lobes themselves are up to 3 mm wide, generally overlap each other, and are slightly convex. The colour of the lobes ranges from whitish grey to brownish grey, and they are uniformly covered with a dense, white powdery coating (pruina). The underside of the thallus is white to brownish, featuring a few thick and simple rhizines, which are root-like structures that help anchor the lichen.

The upper layer of the thallus, or cortex, is made of densely packed cells (paraplectenchymatous), while the inner layer, or medulla, is white. Physcia magnussonii commonly produces apothecia (fruiting bodies) that are up to 3 mm across. These have a black disc that is usually white-pruinose and are bordered by a smooth, thallus-like margin. The fruiting bodies contain spore-producing structures called asci, which are club-shaped, very thin-walled, and feature a tall, blue-staining tholus with an indistinct amyloid ring when treated with iodine (K/I+ blue), characteristic of the Lecanora-type asci. Each ascus holds eight ascospores.

The spores are one-septate (divided into two cells by an internal partition, or septum), brown, and narrowly ellipsoid, measuring 16–24 by 6–9 μm. They have a unique verrucose (warty) ornamentation and have thickened walls at the apex and septum, typical of the genus Physcia. Pycnidia, small fruiting bodies containing asexual spores (conidia), are also common and appear as immersed black dots. The conidia are almost cylindrical in shape.

In terms of chemical properties, the cortex tests K+ (yellow), indicating the presence of atranorin, a common lichen product, whereas other chemical spot tests on the medulla may show negative (K−) or a pale pink reaction (K+ pale pink), with no reaction to other tests: (C−), (KC−), and paraphenylenediamine (P−).

Variolaric acid is a secondary metabolite (lichen product) that has been shown to occur in some Norwegian specimens of Physcia magnussonii. This rare depsidone substance is known to occur in only a few lichen species, mostly in the order Pertusariales.

== Species interactions ==
Zwackhiomyces turcicus is a lichenicolous fungus that was reported growing on the thalli of Physcia magnussonii lichens in southern Turkey. Infection by the commensalistic or weakly parasitic fungus results in slight bleaching on the infected part of the host thallus. The fungus is only known to occur in its type locality in Pinus nigra forest in Gevne Vadisi, Taşkent.

== Habitat and distribution ==
Physcia magnussonii is found in Northern and Central Europe, and Greenland. In North America, its distribution is poorly known, but it has been recorded in Washington, Oregon, and Idaho southwards to Colorado.
