= Physcia occidentalis =

Scientific classification
- Domain: Eukaryota
- Kingdom: Fungi
- Division: Ascomycota
- Class: Lecanoromycetes
- Order: Caliciales
- Family: Physciaceae
- Genus: Physcia
- Species: P. occidentalis

Binomial name
- Physcia occidentalis Essl. & McCune (2020)

Species of lichen

Physcia occidentalis is an obligately saxicolous lichenized fungus in the family Physciaceae that reproduces through the process of fragmentation, "primarily through the production of largely terminal blastidia". It occurs in a multitude of locations, all the way from British Columbia to California, but has also been seen in Colorado, primarily in forest environments. It is very similar to Physcia rhizinata and they have been confused for each other before.
