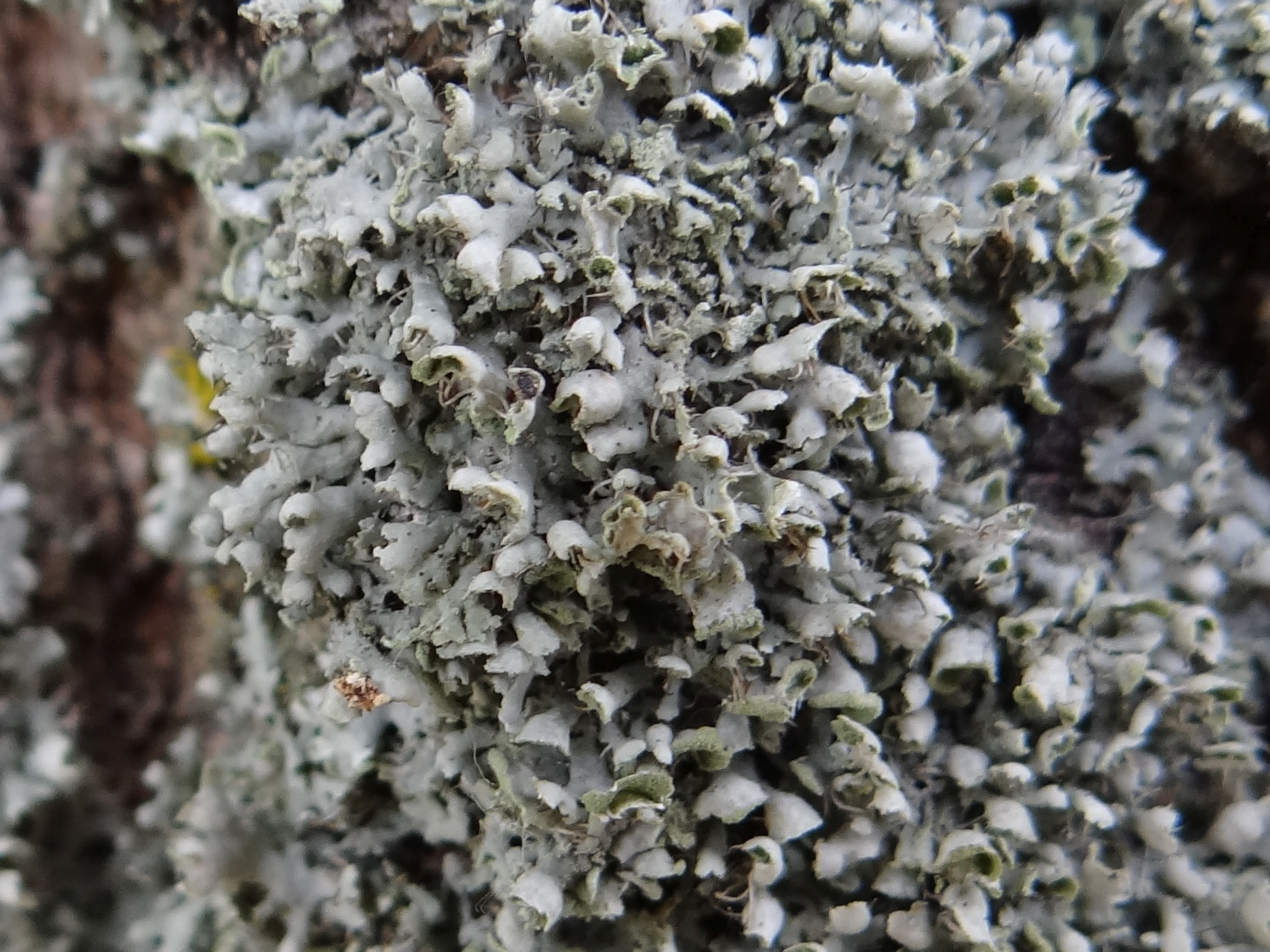

Conservation status
- Secure (NatureServe)

Scientific classification
- Kingdom: Fungi
- Division: Ascomycota
- Class: Lecanoromycetes
- Order: Caliciales
- Family: Physciaceae
- Genus: Physcia
- Species: P. adscendens

Binomial name
- Physcia adscendens H.Olivier (1882)

Synonyms
- List: Physcia hispida f. adscendens (H.Olivier) Walt.Watson (1930); Lichen anthelinus Ach. (1799); Parmelia anthelina (Ach.) Ach. (1803); Parmelia aipolia var. anthelina (Ach.) Ach. (1810); Lichen aipolius * anthelina (Ach.) Lam. (1813); Physcia stellaris f. anthelina (Ach.) Nyl. (1861); Dimelaena stellaris f. anthelina (Ach.) Trevis. (1868); Physcia stellaris var. anthelina (Ach.) Th.Fr. (1871); Physcia aipolia f. anthelina (Ach.) Vain. (1881); Parmelia stellaris f. anthelina (Ach.) Hazsl. (1884); Xanthoria aipolia var. anthelina (Ach.) Horw. (1912); Physcia aipolia var. anthelina (Ach.) Zahlbr. (1931); Dimelaena stellaris var. adscendens Trevis. (1868); Physcia stellaris var. adscendens (Trevis.) Rabenh. (1870); Physcia ascendens Bitter (1901)

= Physcia adscendens =

Species of lichen-forming fungus

Physcia adscendens, the hooded rosette lichen, is a species of foliose lichen in the family Physciaceae. Originally described in 1882, this widely distributed lichen is characterised by its distinctive hood-shaped lobes that curl upward at the tips and long dark-tipped hairs growing from underneath. The species has a broad ecological tolerance and can colonise various substrates, from limestone monuments to tree bark, contributing to its success as a pioneer species following environmental disturbances.

== Taxonomy ==
It was described as a new species by the French botanist Henri Jacques François Olivier in 1882. In his original description, Olivier noted that Physcia adscendens has an ashy white or blue-gray body (thallus) that is narrowly divided into segments. He described these segments as growing upward in crowded, overlapping layers, with numerous hair-like projections along the edges that are either the same colour as the main body or slightly darker at the tips. Olivier observed that the spore-producing structures are either bare or covered with a powdery coating, appearing blackish with smooth edges and a wavy shape. He recorded the spores as numbering 8 per spore sac, being oval-shaped, brown, divided by one cross-wall, and measuring 15–23 by 8–11 micrometres.

Although the original French text attributes some descriptions to 'Th. Fr.' (Theodor Magnus Fries), Olivier is recognised as the authority for this species. The type specimen, H-ACH 1428, was later designated by Jack Laundon in 1995, when he proposed the name for conservation.

In North America, the species is commonly known as the "hooded rosette lichen".

== Description ==
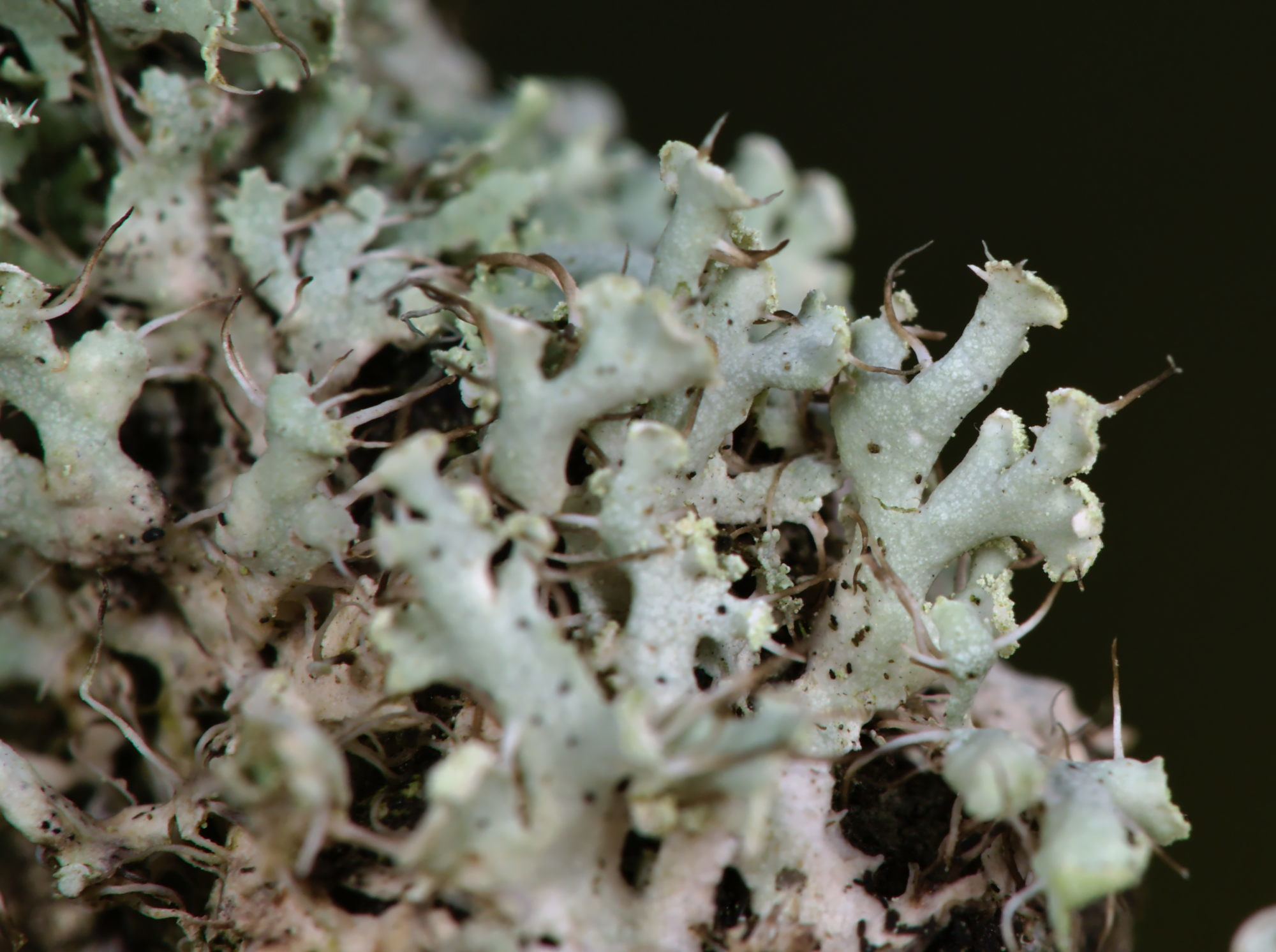
Close view of lobes and cilia

Physcia adscendens has a thallus that ranges in colour from grey to greenish grey, with narrow hood-shaped lobes turned up at the ends. Long dark tipped cilia grow from under the hoods. Pseudocyphellae cover the upper surface. Soralia form at the edges of hoods to open out revealing soredia. Apothecia appear on short stalks with black pruinose discs. The spores measure 16–23 by 7–10 μm. Spot tests of the cortex are K+ (yellow); the medulla is unreactive (K−, C−, P−), a combination that indicates the presence of atranorin.

== Habitat, distribution, and ecology ==
Physcia adscendens grows on both calcareous and siliceous rocks. It is common on limestone monuments, twigs and tree trunks. In a Spanish study of the post-fire colonisation success of various lichen species, Physcia adscendens was determined to have one of the greatest colonisation success rates due to its ability to colonise a variety of substrates. It was able to grow on all of the studied substrates, and comprised the largest biomass percentage in the study area. It is often found colonising granite, including churches and monuments.

In a 2011 study, Physcia adscendens thallus was fed to nine snail species that are common in temperate Europe. The lichen was able to regenerate from about 40% of the faecal pellets, suggesting that this could be another way that the lichen is dispersed. A 2025 survey of epiphytic lichens on 576 roadside trees in Amsterdam recorded 100 species; P. adscendens was among the very common epiphytes, occurring on more than 500 of the 576 surveyed trees alongside Xanthoria parietina. The authors placed P. adscendens at the core of a xerophytic–nitrophilous ecological group (corresponding to the Physcietum adscendentis association) that forms lush mosaics on many urban trunks, and often persists as one of the last lichens on severely desiccated bark where most other species have disappeared.

Lichenicolous (lichen-dwelling) fungus species that are known to use Physcia adscendens as a host include Lichenoconium lichenicolum and Phoma physciicola.
