= Physcia cinerea =

Scientific classification
- Kingdom: Fungi
- Division: Ascomycota
- Class: Lecanoromycetes
- Order: Caliciales
- Family: Physciaceae
- Genus: Physcia
- Species: P. cinerea

Binomial name
- Physcia cinerea Moberg (1990)

Species of lichen

Physcia cinerea is a species of saxicolous (rock-dwelling), foliose lichen in the family Physciaceae. It was described as a new species in 1990 by the Swedish lichenologist Roland Moberg. The lichen is found in Argentina, Ecuador, Peru, and Venezuela at elevations between 2,500 and 4,000 m (8,200 and 13,100 ft), typically on sun-exposed rocks in páramo habitat. It has an orbicular to irregularly shaped thallus up to 3 cm in diameter, comprising narrow lobes up to 1 mm wide. The thallus is grey to dark grey, while the underside is white to brownish, with abundant rhizines of the same colour. Apothecia (fruiting bodies), which are usually abundant, are lecanorine in form and up to 1.5 mm in diameter. They have a dark brown to black disc that lacks pruina. Both the upper cortex and the medulla of the lichen are K+ (yellow). Secondary metabolites (lichen products) in the species include atranorin, zeorin, and leucotylin.
