= Physcia dakotensis =

Conservation status
- Apparently Secure (NatureServe)

Scientific classification
- Kingdom: Fungi
- Division: Ascomycota
- Class: Lecanoromycetes
- Order: Caliciales
- Family: Physciaceae
- Genus: Physcia
- Species: P. dakotensis

Binomial name
- Physcia dakotensis Essl. (2004)
- Holotype: Marshall County, South Dakota

Species of lichen

Physcia dakotensis is a species of saxicolous (rock-dwelling) foliose lichen in the family Physciaceae. It was formally described as new to science in 2004, based on specimens collected from granitic rock in South Dakota, USA. The lichen forms small, tightly appressed, leaf-like thalli with narrow gray lobes that produce distinctive coarse, upright soredia, and it was initially mistaken for the eastern North American species P. subtilis. It is distinguished by its highly fissured morphology, poorly developed lower cortex with sparse rhizines, and K-positive cortex containing atranorin.

== Taxonomy ==
Physcia dakotensis was formally described as new to science in 2004 by Theodore L. Esslinger, who published the diagnosis and Latin protologue in Mycotaxon. The holotype (Esslinger 16030–2) was gathered on July 25, 1996, along State Highway 25, just south of Lake City, Marshall County, South Dakota, where the lichen was growing on hard, acidic granitic rock.

Esslinger coined the specific epithet dakotensis to reflect the Dakotan prairie where the species was first encountered during fieldwork that began in 1975. For years the minute, rock-dwelling thalli were mistaken for the eastern North American P. subtilis, but closer study revealed a distinctive set of characters: tightly appressed, highly fissured lobes that develop coarse, upright soredia; a poorly developed lower cortex with few or no rhizines; and a K-positive cortex producing atranorin. Taken together, these traits warranted recognition at the species level and set P. dakotensis apart from all previously described North American members of the genus Physcia.

== Description ==
Physcia dakotensis forms a small, leaf-like (foliose) thallus that often merges so tightly with the rock surface that it looks almost crust-like. Mature cushions are generally round and about 1–2 centimetres (3/8–3/4 in) across (occasionally larger where neighboring thalli fuse). The individual lobes are narrow—roughly 0.2–0.6 mm wide—and lie flat at their tips but become slightly swollen and roof-shaped farther back. Their upper surface is gray to gray-white and may darken at the very ends; as the lichen ages it produces coarse, grainy patches of powdery propagules (soredia). These soredia are densely packed and stand erect, giving the lobe interiors a rough, bristly appearance described as isidioid. Beneath the surface the medulla (inner tissue) is white, while the lower cortex is poorly developed and visible only near the lobe tips. Anchoring threads (rhizines) are sparse, short, and sometimes absent, so most of the lower surface is pressed directly against its siliceous rock substrate. Chemical spot tests show the cortex is K+ (yellow), a reaction caused by the secondary compound atranorin, but the medulla remains unchanged (K–).
