= Physcia rolandii =

Scientific classification
- Kingdom: Fungi
- Division: Ascomycota
- Class: Lecanoromycetes
- Order: Caliciales
- Family: Physciaceae
- Genus: Physcia
- Species: P. rolandii

Binomial name
- Physcia rolandii Elix (2011)
- Holotype: Boundary Road, South Australia

Species of lichen

Physcia rolandii is a species of foliose lichen in the family Physciaceae, first described in 2011. This species is named after the Swedish lichenologist Roland Moberg in recognition of his contributions to the study of the genus Physcia.

== Taxonomy ==
Physcia rolandii was formally described by John Elix based on a type specimen he collected north of Tailem Bend in South Australia. It is closely related to Physcia jackii but can be distinguished by its immaculate (spotless), rough or frosted surface and its unique chemical profile containing 6a,22-dihydroxyhopane-25-oic acid.

== Description ==
The thallus of Physcia rolandii is generally circular or occasionally irregularly shaped, adhering closely to the substrate and ranging from 1 to 6 cm in width. The upper surface is medium to pale grey, often glossy, with a white, patchy (areolate), scabrid to frosted appearance at the tips. Lobes are 0.5–1.2 mm wide, flat to slightly convex, becoming strongly wrinkled and bullate (blistered) especially in the centre of older lobes, occasionally with distinct white margins; tips are typically truncate and notched. The lower surface is off-white to pale brown; rhizines are sparse to frequent, pale brown to black-brown, up to 0.6 mm long. Fruiting bodies (apothecia) are common, sitting flat at first but becoming wavy (undulate) and distorted as they age, with a dark brown to black, densely frosted (pruinose) disc. Ascospores are ellipsoid, measuring 17−30 by 7−12 μm.

== Habitat and distribution ==
Physcia rolandii is found in dry inland regions across Western Australia, South Australia, Queensland, New South Wales, and Victoria. It grows predominantly on dead branches in dry Callitris and mallee Eucalyptus woodland.

== Chemistry ==
Chemical analysis of the cortex and medulla reveals a potassium hydroxide (K+) yellow reaction. The species contains significant amounts of atranorin and zeorin, along with other specific triterpenes contributing to its unique chemosyndrome.
