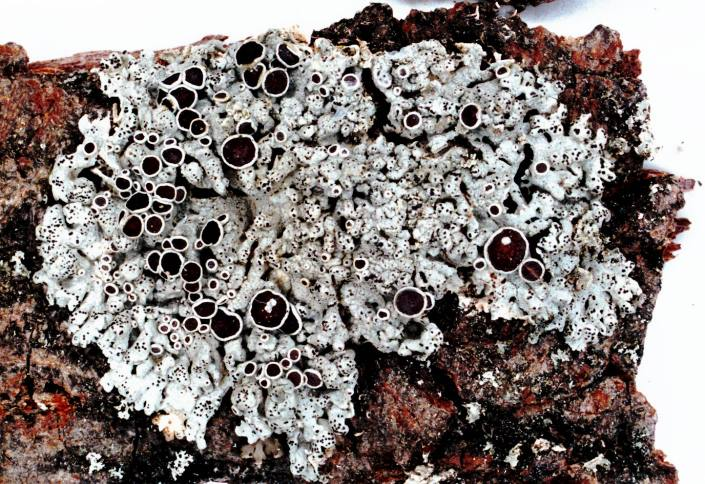

Conservation status
- Secure (NatureServe)

Scientific classification
- Kingdom: Fungi
- Division: Ascomycota
- Class: Lecanoromycetes
- Order: Caliciales
- Family: Physciaceae
- Genus: Physcia
- Species: P. stellaris

Binomial name
- Physcia stellaris (L.) Nyl. (1853)

Synonyms
- Species synonymy: Anaptychia stellaris (Link) (L.) A. Massal.(1853); Borrera stellaris (Link) (L.) Mudd, in Körber. (1860) [1865]; Dimelaena stellaris (Link) (L.) Norman, Conat. Praem.(1852); Geissodea stellaris (Link) (L.) A. St.-Hil.(1805); Hagenia stellaris (Link) (L.) De Not.(1846); Imbricaria stellaris (Link) (L.) DC. (1805); Lichen stellaris (Link) L.(1753); Lobaria stellari (Link) (L.) Hoffm. (1884); Parmelia stellaris (Link) (L.) Ach.(1803); Physcia retrogressa (Link) Stirt.(1876)

= Physcia stellaris =

Species of lichen-forming fungus

Physcia stellaris is a species of lichen. It is pale grey, but darker in the centre, and lacks isidia, lobules, soredia and pruina.It tests positive K+ yellow upper cortex with a 10% potassium hydroxide solution. In North America, it is known colloquially as the fringed rosette lichen.

It can grow as an epiphyte. In Greece, it has been reported from the trunk of Platanus trees.

== Taxonomy ==
It was initially described as Lichen stellaris by Carl Linnaeus in 1753 before receiving its own genus of Physcia in 1856 by William Nylander.

== Description ==
The thallus of Physcia stellaris can be described as foliose as it has aspects of leaf-like lichen structures. The size and shape of the thallus is irregular and can grow up to 4 cm in diameter. Lobes are loosely appressed and are on average only 0.5 mm in size. The upper surface is whitish grey, appearing as almost a cream color. It lacks any form of soredia or isidia on the upper surface. The lower surface is white to brown with simple rhizines. Apothecia are abundant varying in size from 0.5mm-1.5mm and have fruiting bodies shaped like a plate with a ring around them called lecanorine. Ascocarp containing 8 brown, septate ascospores ranging in size from 15-18 μm. Is found as a lichen in all forms.

Physcia stellaris can be differentiated from all other Physcia species due to lack of soredia, with exception to P. aipolia. P. aipolia can be differentiated from P. stellaris due to aipolia’s broader lobes and apothecia that tend to be pruinose.

== Distribution and habitat ==
This species is commonly found lichenized on bark and rock all across the temperate zones of North America as well as parts of Europe. Documented findings of this species range from Georgia to the Canadian Northwest Territories. The species is quite common on deciduous trees but can also be found less commonly on conifers.

== Reproduction ==
Physcia stellaris shows no evident means of asexual reproduction due to its lack of isidia or soredia. This species has abundance of apothecia that allow for sexual reproduction.

== See also ==
- List of lichens named by Carl Linnaeus
