= Kashiwadia =

Scientific classification
- Kingdom: Fungi
- Division: Ascomycota
- Class: Lecanoromycetes
- Order: Caliciales
- Family: Physciaceae
- Genus: Kashiwadia; S.Y.Kondr., Lőkös & Hur (2014)

Type species
- Kashiwadia orientalis (Kashiw.) S.Y.Kondr., Lőkös & Hur (2014)

Species
- K. austrostellaris K. jackii K. littoralis K. nubila K. orientalis K. tropica

Genus of lichens

Kashiwadia is a genus of lichen-forming fungi in the family Physciaceae. The genus was circumscribed in Sergey Kondratyuk, László Lőkös, and Jae-Seoun Hur in 2014 to contain the species Physcia orientalis, after molecular phylogenetic analysis showed that the taxon occupied an isolated phylogenetic position in the Physciaceae. An additional five species were added to the genus in 2021. The genus name honours Japanese lichenologist Hiroyuki Kashiwadani, who originally described the type species.

== Description ==
Kashiwadia species are foliose (leafy) and whitish-grey, with lobes measuring 1–2.5 mm wide. The upper surface of the thallus is smooth, convex, and lacks pruina, while the lower surface is pale to brownish. Apothecia are rare; when present, they are cup-shaped with a diameter of 1–2 mm and a brown, pruinose disc. Both atranorin and zeorin are lichen products found in the genus.

== Species ==
- Kashiwadia austrostellaris (Elix) S.Y.Kondr., Lőkös & Hur (2021)
- Kashiwadia jackii (Moberg) S.Y.Kondr., Lőkös & Hur (2021)
- Kashiwadia littoralis (Elix) S.Y.Kondr., Lőkös & Hur (2021)
- Kashiwadia nubila (Moberg) S.Y.Kondr., Lőkös & Hur (2021)
- Kashiwadia orientalis (Kashiw.) S.Y.Kondr., Lőkös & Hur (2014)
- Kashiwadia tropica (Elix) S.Y.Kondr., Lőkös & Hur (2021)
