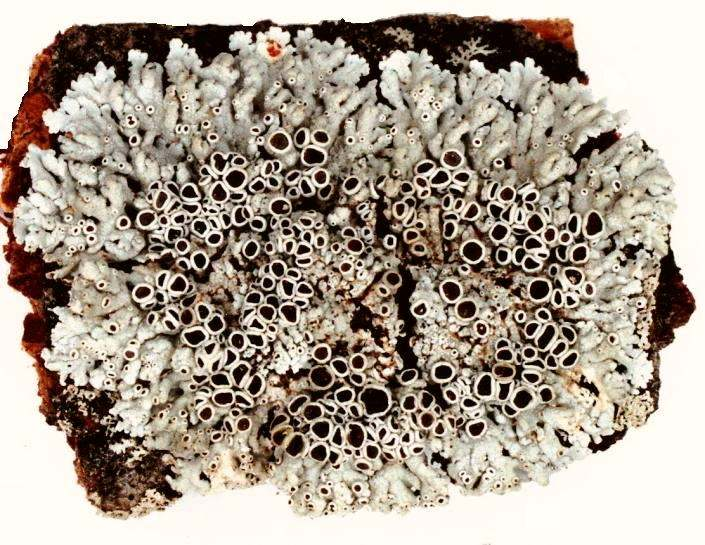

Conservation status
- Secure (NatureServe)

Scientific classification
- Kingdom: Fungi
- Division: Ascomycota
- Class: Lecanoromycetes
- Order: Caliciales
- Family: Physciaceae
- Genus: Physcia
- Species: P. aipolia

Binomial name
- Physcia aipolia (Ehrh. ex Humb.) Fürnr., 1839

Synonyms
- List: Anaptychia stellaris var. aipolia (Ehrh. ex Humb.) A.Massal.; Dimelaena stellaris f. cercidia (Ach.) Trevis.; Dimelaena stellaris var. aipolia (Ehrh. ex Humb.) Trevis.; Imbricaria aipolia (Ehrh. ex Humb.) DC.; Lichen aipolius Ehrh.; Lichen aipolius Ehrh. ex Humb.; Lichen aipolius subsp. cercidia (Ach.) Lam.; Lichen anthelinus Ach.; Lichen stellaris var. aipolius (Ehrh. ex Humb.) Wahlenb.; Lobaria aipolia (Ehrh. ex Humb.) Hoffm.; Lobaria stellaris var. aipolia (Ehrh. ex Humb.) Hepp; Parmelia aipolia (Ehrh. ex Humb.) Ach.; Parmelia aipolia var. cercidia Ach.; Parmelia cercidia (Ach.) Röhl.; Parmelia stellaris f. aipolia (Ehrh. ex Humb.) Hazsl.; Parmelia stellaris f. cercidia (Ach.) Hazsl.; Parmelia stellaris var. aipolia (Ehrh. ex Humb.) Fr.; Physcia afra Hue; Physcia aipolia (Ehrh.) Hampe; Physcia aipolia f. cercidia (Ach.) Mig.; Physcia aipolia f. decolorata Vain., 1881; Physcia aipolia f. verruculosa Vain., 1921; Physcia aipolia subsp. acrita (Ach.) Hue; Physcia aipolia subsp. aipolia (Ehrh. ex Humb.) Fürnr.; Physcia aipolia subsp. anthelina (Ach.) Vain.; Physcia aipolia subsp. crenulata Vain.; Physcia aipolia subsp. decolorata Vain.; Physcia aipolia subsp. pruinosa Lynge; Physcia aipolia subsp. verruculosa Vain.; Physcia aipolia var. acrita (Ach.); Physcia aipolia var. aipolia; Physcia aipolia var. angustata (Nyl.) Lynge; Physcia aipolia var. angustata (Nyl.) Vain., 1881; Physcia aipolia var. anthelina (Ach.) Vain.; Physcia aipolia var. caesiopruinosa (Arnold) Sántha; Physcia aipolia var. cercida (Ach.) Lamy; Physcia aipolia var. cercida (Ach.) Nyl.; Physcia aipolia var. cercidia (Ach.) Nyl.; Physcia aipolia var. gisleri Frey; Physcia aipolia var. pruinosa Lynge; Physcia stellaris f. aipolia (Ehrh. ex Humb.) Th.Fr.; Physcia stellaris f. cercidia (Ach.) Nyl.; Physcia stellaris var. aipolia (Ehrh. ex Humb.) Nyl.; Physcia stellaris var. aipolia (Ehrh. ex Humb.) Th.Fr.; Physcia stellaris var. aipolia (Ehrh. ex Humb.) Tuck.; Physcia stellaris var. angustata Nyl.; Physcia stellaris var. cercidia (Ach.) Th.Fr.; Squamaria aipolia (Ehrh. ex Humb.) Frege; Xanthoria aipolia (Ehrh. ex Humb.) Horw.; Xanthoria aipolia var. cercidia (Ach.) Horw.

= Physcia aipolia =

Species of lichen

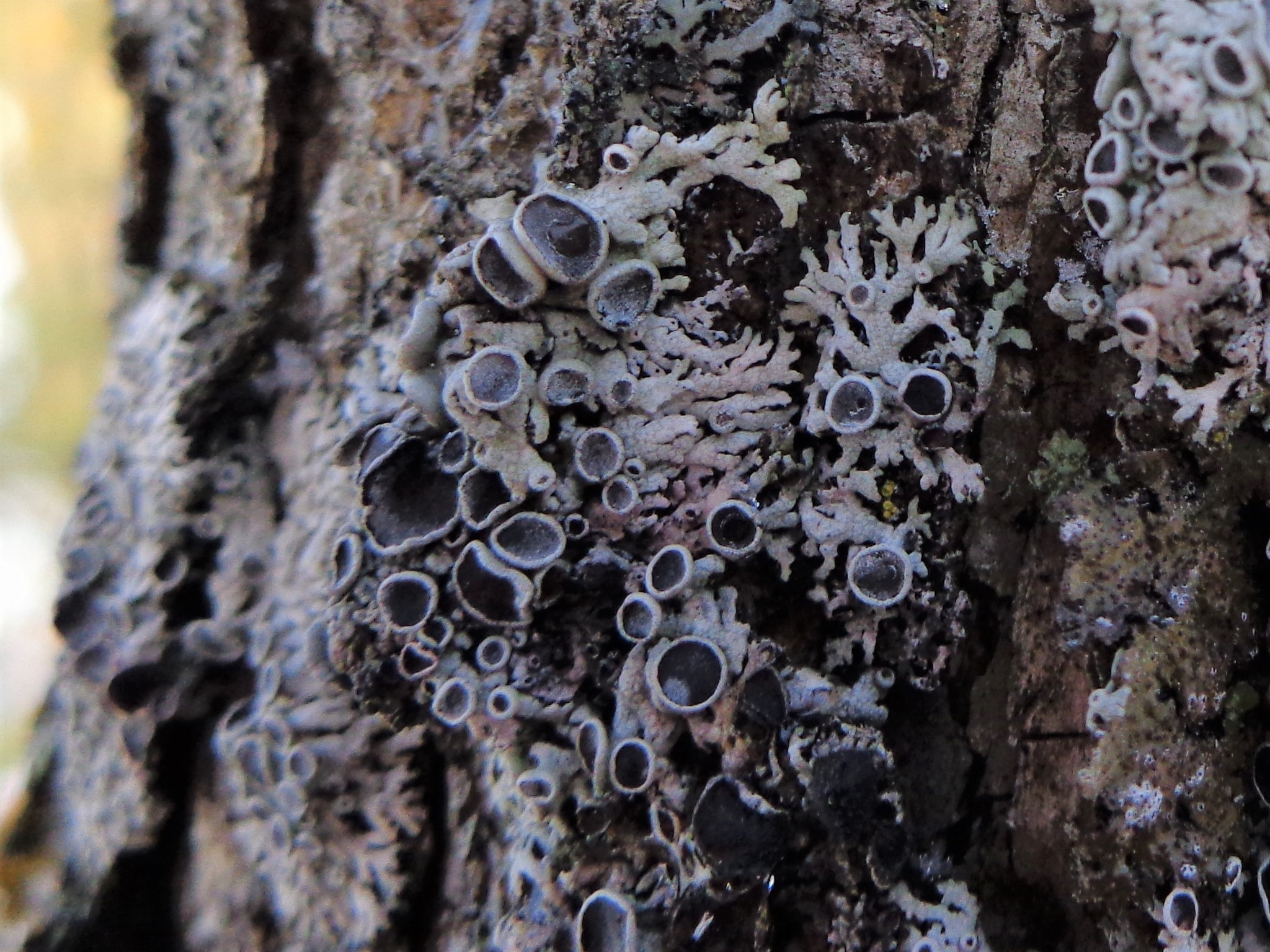
Physcia aipolia growing on the bark of a tree.

Physcia aipolia, commonly known as the Hoary rosette lichen, is a lichen species of fungus in the genus Physcia, and family Lecanoromycetes. Physcia aipolia is a species of lichen in the family Physciaceae. It has a worldwide distribution.Physcia aipolia is a known host species to the lichenicolous fungus species Muellerella lichenicola. It is characterized by the pale blue to gray thallus with many apothecia. Physcia aipolia is a common, widely distributed species, and can be found growing on a variety of trees and branches.

== Morphology ==
Physcia aipolia, which is also known as the Hoary rosette lichen, is characterized by a pale blue to gray thallus. This foliose thallus typically grows approximately 6 centimeters in diameter. Physcia aipolia lack a specialized root structure. There are numerous apothecia present, with discs that are dark gray to black in color. The apothecia can be up to 2 millimeters in diameter, and the shape ranges from flat to convex. The apothecia contain ascospores that are brown in color, and 16-29 x 7-12 micrometers. There are no soredia or isidia present. The lower surface is white to pale brown in color, and it contains many pale rhizines.

== Habitat and Ecology ==
Physcia aipolia is a common lichen, that typically grows in well-lit, nutrient dense areas. It is often found on a variety of tree bark and wood. Physcia aipolia is recognized as having a secure and apparently secure state and provisional conservation status. Physcia aipolia has a wide coverage of habitat ranging from Eastern Canada, Alaska, California, Wisconsin, Michigan, and Missouri. In addition, Physcia aipolia growth is not limited by elevation, and the lichen is found at both sea level and upper elevation environments across North America. It is found in both rural and urban environments, and this lichen can tolerate environmental stress and desiccation in arctic, temperate, and boreal areas of North America and Eurasia. Physcia aipolia is resistant to pollution, and it has been used as a bioindicator to monitor air quality by the USDA. Since Physcia aipolia does not have protective structures, environmental chemicals are reabsorbed. Physcia aipolia has been used to measure regional levels of Al, Cr, Cu, Fe, N, and S, which are then compared to local air pollution data.

== Chemical reactions ==
The medulla and cortex has a K+ yellow test, due to atranorin and zeorin.
