= Atraric acid =

Names
- Preferred IUPAC name Methyl 2,4-dihydroxy-3,6-dimethylbenzoate
- Other names Veramoss, Evernyl

Identifiers
CAS Number	4707-47-5
3D model (JSmol)	Interactive image
ChemSpider	70804
ECHA InfoCard	100.022.902
PubChem CID	78435
UNII	12YH9T04QE
CompTox Dashboard (EPA)	DTXSID9041653
- InChI: InChI=1S/C10H12O4/c1-5-4-7(11)6(2)9(12)8(5)10(13)14-3/h4,11-12H,1-3H3 Key: UUQHKWMIDYRWHH-UHFFFAOYSA-N
- SMILES: Cc1cc(c(c(c1C(=O)OC)O)C)O

Properties
Chemical formula	C_{10}H_{12}O_{4}
Molar mass	196.202 g·mol^{−1}
Melting point	143–145 °C (289–293 °F; 416–418 K)
- Except where otherwise noted, data are given for materials in their standard state (at 25 °C [77 °F], 100 kPa). Infobox references

Atraric acid is a naturally occurring phenolic compound and ester with the IUPAC name methyl 2,4-dihydroxy-3,6-dimethylbenzoate and molecular formula C_{10}H_{12}O_{4}. It occurs in the root-bark of Pygeum africanum and Evernia prunastri (Oakmoss). There is evidence to suggest that it has antiandrogenic activity in humans and its use in treatment of benign prostate hyperplasia, prostate cancer, and spinal and bulbar muscular atrophy has been investigated.
