= Nitrophily =

Plant which prefers high-nitrogen soils

Nitrophily is a botanical term that indicates a preference of certain plant species for a habitat rich in nitrate. This term was introduced by George Fuller during the 1930s. The word is a contraction of the Greek words νἴτρον (nitron) meaning "saltpetre" and φίλος (philos) meaning "friendly".

Nitrophily is traditionally expressed as a score between 1 (not nitrophilous at all) and 10 (extremely nitrophilous) according to the Ellenberg N Index. Alternatively, the response of leaf area to nitrogen supply is a relatively simple method to produce a proxy for the nitrophily. Mostly the nitrophily is consistent with the nitrate availability, where the lowest values occur with plants that grow in peat bogs (such as Drosera- and Erica-species), while the highest values occur with plants that grow on fresh organic waste such as dung piles, waste heaps and strandlines (such as Chenopodium-, and Urtica-species).
