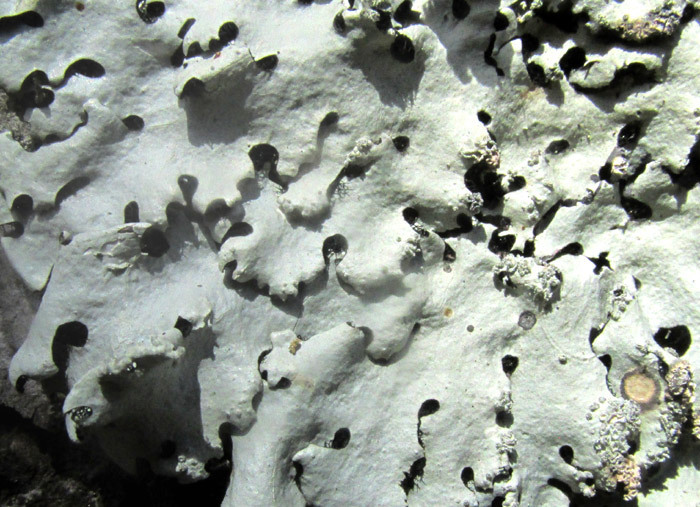
- Parmotrema reticulatum, foliose thallus

Conservation status
- Secure (NatureServe)

Scientific classification
- Kingdom: Fungi
- Division: Ascomycota
- Class: Lecanoromycetes
- Order: Lecanorales
- Family: Parmeliaceae
- Genus: Parmotrema
- Species: P. reticulatum

Binomial name
- Parmotrema reticulatum (Taylor) M.Choisy (1952)

Synonyms
- see text

= Parmotrema reticulatum =

Species of lichen

Parmotrema reticulatum is a lichen in the ruffle lichen family, the Parmeliaceae.

== Description ==
Parmotrema reticulatum, often known as the Black Sheet Lichen, is a foliose lichen whose grayish thalli grow closely to loosely attached to its substrate. The thalli are conspicuously lobed with slightly overlapping, rounded lobes, which appear more jagged with age. It's not unusual for blackened areas to form on the upper surface.

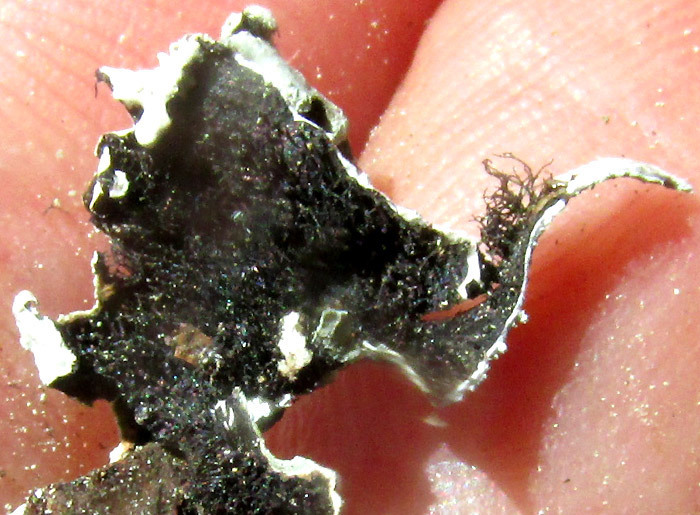
black lower surface with rhizines

The thalli's lower surfaces are black with brown, mottled zones along the edges, and with root-like rhizines growing from the lower surface as seen at the left.

Bowl-shaped apothecia rarely occur, but when they do they are small, only up to 6mm in diameter, and develop indistinct stalks, as seen below the taxonomy box.

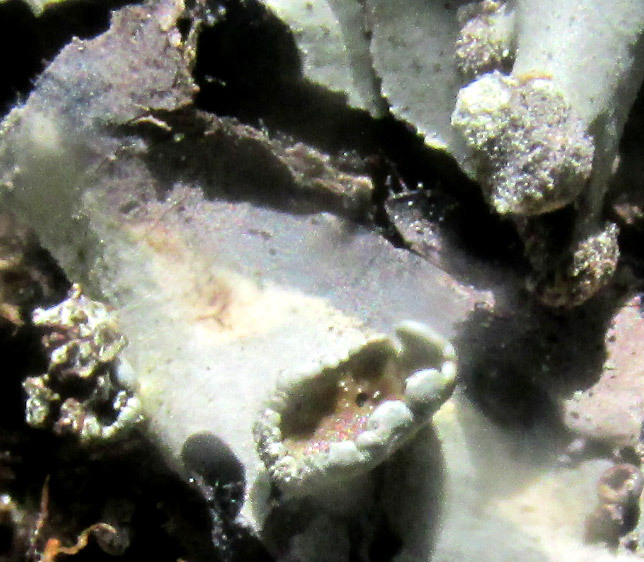
apothecium

== Distribution ==
The map registering verifiable observations of Parmotrema reticulatum on the iNaturalist page for the species documents occurrences worldwide in warm to hot areas, except in tropical rainforests and arid areas.

== Habitat ==
Parmotrema reticulatum usually grows on trees in open habitats, as well as rarely on rocks.

== Human uses ==
=== As a dye ===
Parmotrema reticulatum produces an orange dye by boiling in water, and a brown dye using the "ammonia fermentation method," with the color becoming darker the longer it is fermented. Ammonia fermentation occurs when microorganisms, under anaerobic conditions, convert organic nitrogen in waste materials into ammonia.

=== Medicinally ===
In the Himalayas, Parmotrema reticulatum has been documented as a traditional treatment for coughs and throat and respiratory problems. In Mexico a tea made of the lichen has been used for kidney disorders and venereal disease. The tea is prepared in the late afternoon and drunk the next morning.

A methanol extract of Parmotrema reticulatum has been found to be a promising candidate for management of breast cancers.

=== As a bioindicator ===
Parmotrema reticulatum may be used to monitor air pollution caused by airborne chromium, copper, lead and zinc. These heavy metals can be accumulated even when present in the air in very low concentrations.

=== Synonyms ===
These names were accepted as synonyms for Parmotrema reticulatum as of September, 2025:

- Canomaculina leucosemotheta (Hue) Elix
- Parmelia ciliata (Nyl.) Gyeln. (Ambiguous)
- Parmelia laevigata var. reticulata (Taylor) Linds.
- Parmelia leucosemotheta Hue
- Parmelia macquariensis C.W. Dodge
- Parmelia perforata f. ciliata (Nyl.) Leight.
- Parmelia perforata var. ciliata Nyl.
- Parmelia perlata var. reticulata (Taylor) Linds.
- Parmelia pseudovirens Gyeln.
- Parmelia reticulata Taylor
- Parmelia urceolata f. sorediifera (Müll. Arg.) Stizenb.
- Parmelia urceolata var. sorediifera Müll. Arg.
- Parmelia urceolata var. subcetrata Müll. Arg.
- Parmelia virens var. sorediata Müll. Arg.
- Parmotrema leucosemothetum (Hue) Hale
- Parmotrema pseudovirens (Gyeln.) Elix
- Rimelia reticulata (Taylor) Hale & A. Fletcher

== Etymology ==
The genus name Parmotrema derives from the Greek word paros, meaning "cup," and the Greek trema, meaning "perforation," referring to perforations of the apothecia.

The species name reticulatus is from the Latin reticulatus, meaning "a netted-like network."
