= List of Arthonia species =

This is a list of species in the fungal genus Arthonia, which contains both lichen-forming fungi, and lichenicolous (lichen-dwelling) fungi. As of September 2025, Species Fungorum (in the Catalogue of Life) accepts 164 species of Arthonia. The Arthonia species accepted by Species Fungorum are those for which they have expressed a taxonomic opinion, and does not necessarily represent the total number of species in the family. Although more than 1600 taxa have at one time been placed in the genus, the majority of these are now either considered synonyms of other species, have been moved to other genera, or are too little-known and have been collected too infrequently to have had a taxonomic opinion expressed about them. Recent estimates for the number of species in the genus include 491 (2008), 500 (2017), (Note: Lücking and colleagues acknowledge that the species estimate of some large lichen-forming fungal genera, including Arthonia, are approximations.) and 50 species with 300 "orphaned" (Note: "Orphaned" species are those that have been named and formally described, but have not been updated and reassessed following a revision of the genus they are in.) species (2021). According to a 2018 review of lichenicolous fungi, there are 139 lichenicolous fungi and 1 lichenicolous lichen in Arthonia (Arthonia infectans is the single known example of the latter). In the following list, the host(s) of the lichenicolous taxa are given.

== A ==
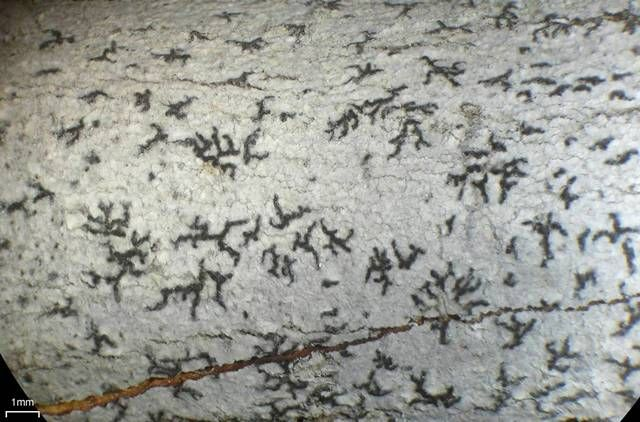
Arthonia albopulverea

- Arthonia acanthotheciicola Ertz & Common (2019)
- Arthonia aciniformis Stirt. (1879)
- Arthonia agelastica R.C.Harris & Lendemer (2016) – host: Lecanora louisiana
- Arthonia albofarinosa Stirt. (1899)
- Arthonia albopulverea Nyl. (1853)
- Arthonia albotrachynae Etayo (2018) – host: Hypotrachyna endochlora
- Arthonia almquistii Vain. (1883) – hosts: Amygdalaria, Koerberiella, Porpidia, and Trapelia
- Arthonia amandineicola van den Boom & Ertz (2017) – Panama; host: Amandinea efflorescens
- Arthonia amoena Müll.Arg. (1895)
- Arthonia amylospora Almq. (1880) – hosts: Porpidia and Farnoldia
- Arthonia anatolica Halıcı & Candan (2011) – host: Aspicilia contorta
- Arthonia andamanica (Makhija & Patw.) M.Cáceres & Lücking (2007)
- Arthonia anglica Coppins (1989)
- Arthonia anjutia S.Y.Kondr. & Alstrup (1996) – host: Teloschistes
- Arthonia apatetica (A.Massal.) Th.Fr. (1866)
- Arthonia apteropteridis Kantvilas & Vězda (1988) – Tasmania
- Arthonia arthoniicola Diederich & Aptroot (1995) – host: Arthonia catenulata
- Arthonia arthonioides (Ach.) A.L.Sm. (1911)
- Arthonia aspiciliae Alstrup & E.S.Hansen (2001) – Greenland; host: Aspicilia
- Arthonia atra (Pers.) A.Schneid. (1898)
- Arthonia atropunctata Vain. (1921) – host: on sterile foliicolous cf. Echinoplaca
- Arthonia ayseniae Halıcı & Candan (2009) – host: Acarospora

== B ==
- Arthonia badia Wedin & Hafellner (1998) – host: Pseudocyphellaria granulata
- Arthonia banksiae Müll.Arg. (1893)
- Arthonia brussei Egea & Torrente (1997) – host: Lecanographa
- Arthonia buelliae Zhurb. (2021)

== C ==
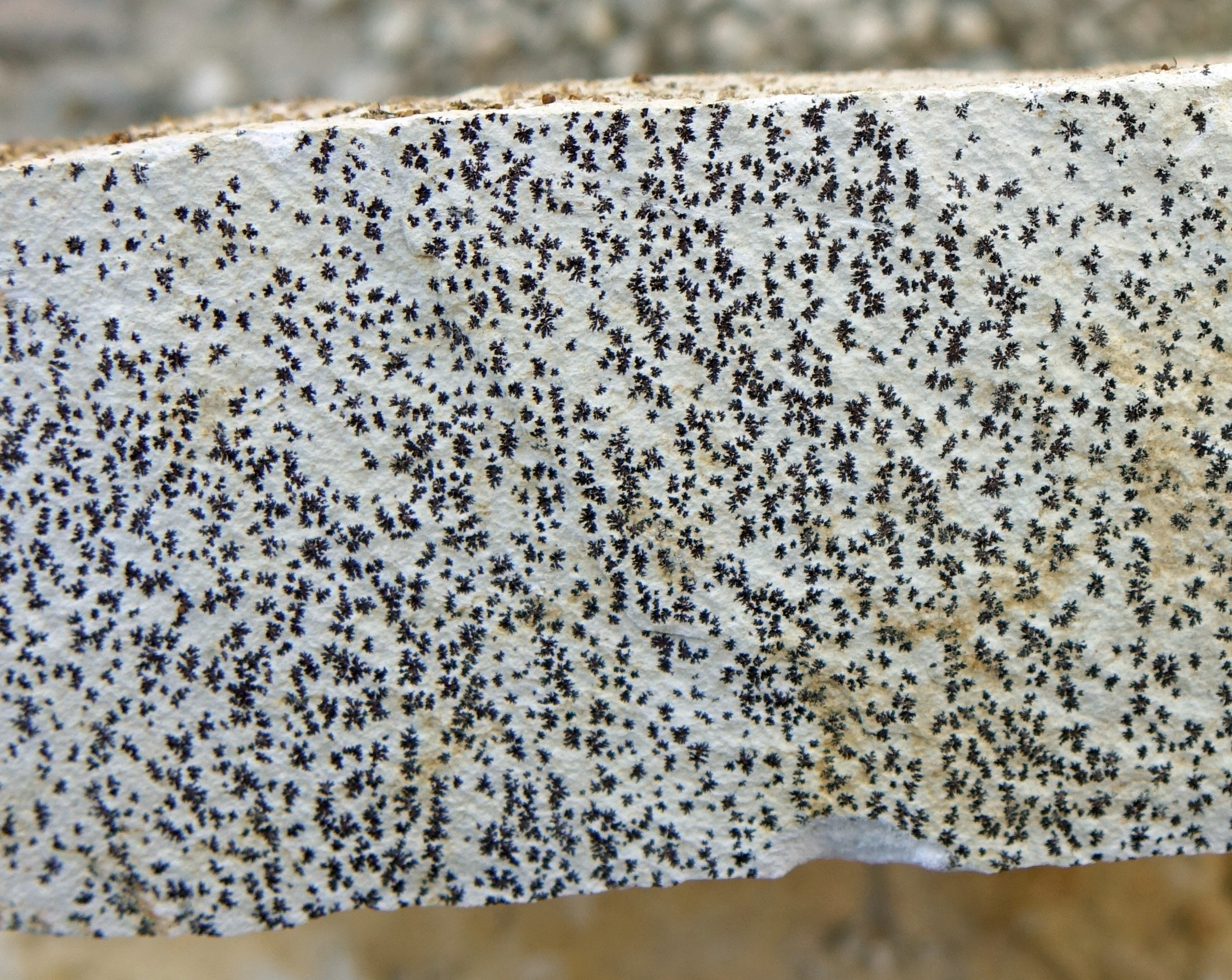
Arthonia calcarea

- Arthonia caerulescens (Almq.) Arnold (1881) – host: Lecanora varia
- Arthonia calcarea (Turner ex Sm.) Ertz & Diederich (2009)
- Arthonia calicii Kantvilas & Wedin (2015) – Kangaroo Island; host: Calicium tricolor
- Arthonia catillarioides Etayo (2017) – host: Sticta
- Arthonia circinata Th.Fr. (1865) – host: Umbilicaria
- Arthonia clemens (Tul.) Th.Fr. (1867) – host: Rhizoplaca
- Arthonia cohabitans Coppins (1989) – host: Arthothelium reagens
- Arthonia colombiana Etayo (2002) – host: Cladonia
- Arthonia complanata Fée (1825)
- Arthonia coniocraeae Brackel (2010) – host: Cladonia coniocraea
- Arthonia conspersula Stirt. (1899)
- Arthonia coreana B.G.Lee & J.S.Hur (2016) – South Korea
- Arthonia coriifoliae Wedin & Hafellner (1998) – Magallanes; host: Pseudocyphellaria coriifolia
- Arthonia coronata Etayo (1996) – host: Flavoparmelia caperata
- Arthonia cyanea Müll.Arg. (1881)
- Arthonia cryptica P.M.McCarthy & Elix (2019)
- Arthonia cryptotheciae R.Sant. ex Matzer & R.Sant. (1995) – host: foliicolous Myriostigma candida

== D ==
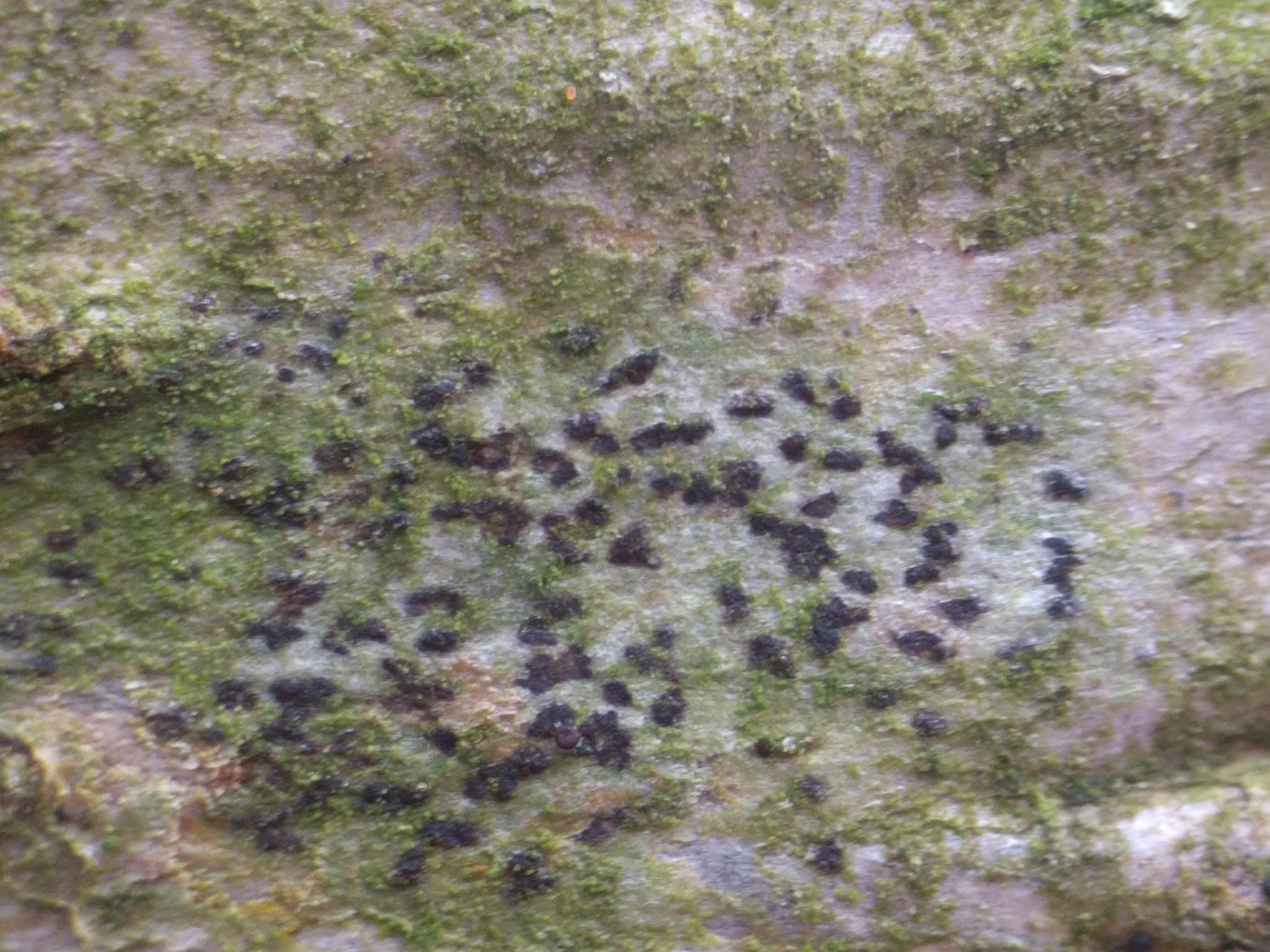
Arthonia didyma

- Arthonia darbishirei Follmann & B.Werner (2003) – South America; host: Roccella nigerrima
- Arthonia delicatula Müll.Arg. (1882)
- Arthonia destruens Rabenh. (1868)

var. destruens Rabenh. (1898): host: Physcia
var. nana Grube & Hafellner (1995) – host: Oxneria fallax

- Arthonia didyma Körb. (1853)
- Arthonia digitatae Hafellner (1999) – host: Cladonia
- Arthonia digitispora Etayo (2002) – host: Sticta
- Arthonia diorygmatis S.Joshi & Upreti (2013) – India; host: Diorygma
- Arthonia diploiciae Calat. & Diederich (1995) – host: Diploicia canescens

== E ==
- Arthonia epifarinosa Etayo (2008) – Chile; host: Pannaria
- Arthonia epiparmelia Zhurb. (2020) – Russia
- Arthonia epipolytropa Hafellner & Grube (2023)– Austria; host: Lecanora polytropa
- Arthonia epitoninia Halıcı & Candan (2009) – Turkey; host: Toninia
- Arthonia excentrica Th.Fr. (1867) – host: Lepraria
- Arthonia exilis (Flörke) Anzi (1860)

== F ==
- Arthonia farinacea (H.Olivier) R.Sant. (1960) – host: on Ramalina, especially R. farinacea
- Arthonia farinosorediata Aptroot (2024) – Brazil
- Arthonia flavicantis Wedin & Hafellner (1998) – host: Pseudocyphellaria flavicans
- Arthonia follmanniana Diederich (1995) – Galápagos Islands; host: Roccella
- Arthonia fuscopurpurea (Tul.) R.Sant. (1960) – host: Peltigera

== G ==
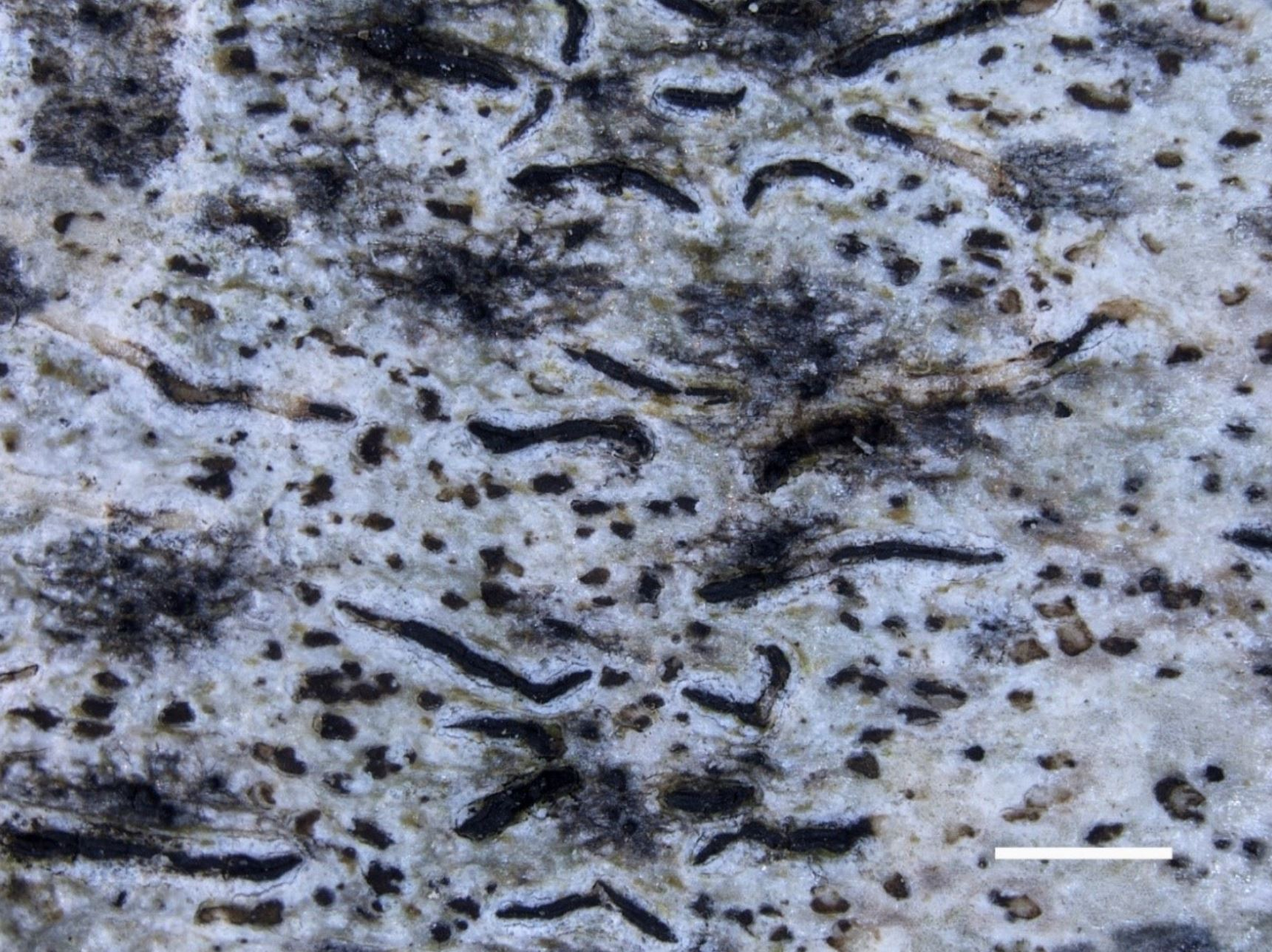
Arthonia graphidicola

- Arthonia galactites (DC.) Dufour (1818)
- Arthonia garajonayi Etayo (1996) – Canary Islands; host: Porina
- Arthonia gattefossei Maheu & Werner (1933)
- Arthonia gelidae R.Sant. (1986) – Placopsis gelida
- Arthonia glacialis Alstrup & E.S.Hansen (2001) – host: Rhizoplaca melanophthalma
- Arthonia gracilenta Müll.Arg. (1882)
- Arthonia gracilior Müll.Arg. (1895)
- Arthonia gracillima Müll.Arg. (1887)
- Arthonia graphidicola Coppins (1989) – host: Graphis scripta
- Arthonia griseopruinosa F.Berger & E.Zimm. (2016) – host: Pertusaria pseudocorallina
- Arthonia gutberletiana Lendemer & D.Ray (2017)

== H ==
- Arthonia haematommatum Kalb & Hafellner (1995)
- Arthonia haematostigma Grube & Hafellner (1995)
- Arthonia hawksworthii Halıcı (2008) – Western Asia; host: Dimelaena
- Arthonia hertelii (Calat., Barreno & V.J.Rico) Hafellner & Volk.John (2006) – host: Aspicilia
- Arthonia heterodermiae Etayo (2017) – host: Heterodermia

== I ==
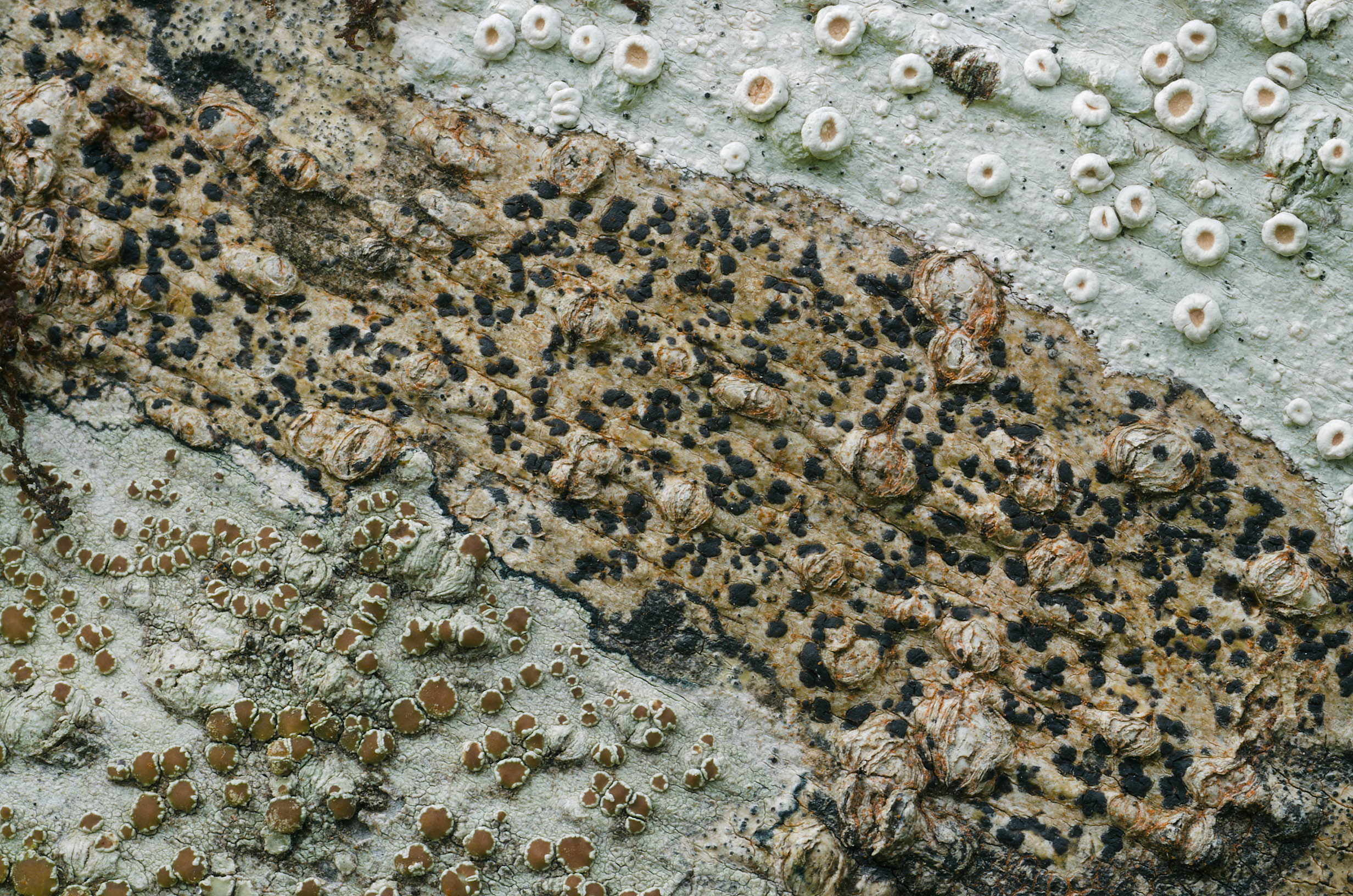
Arthonia ilicina

- Arthonia ilicina Taylor (1836)
- Arthonia ilicinella Nyl. (1867)
- Arthonia infectans Egea & Torrente (1995) – western USA; host: juvenile lichenicolous on Lecanographa hypothallina and Sparria cerebriforme
- Arthonia ingaderiae Follmann (2003) – South America; host: Ingaderia
- Arthonia insularis Kantvilas & Wedin (2015) – host: Sirenophila eos
- Arthonia interstes Müll.Arg. (1895)
- Arthonia intermedia Matzer (1996) – Costa Rica; host: foliicolous Porina
- Arthonia intexta Almq. (1880) – host: Lecidella
- Arthonia invadens Coppins (1989) – host: Schismatomma quercicola
- Arthonia isidiata Grube, Lücking & L.Umaña (2004) – Costa Rica

== J ==
- Arthonia japewiae Grube & Holien (1997) – host: Japewia

== L ==
- Arthonia lecaniicola van den Boom & Moniri (2018) – Iran; host: Lecania triseptata
- Arthonia lecanorina (Almq.) R.Sant. (2004)
- Arthonia lecideicola Zhurb. & Stepanchikova (2020) – Russia
- Arthonia lecideola Müll.Arg. (1893)
- Arthonia lepidiota (H.Olivier) R.Sant. (2004)
- Arthonia leptospora Müll.Arg. (1891)
- Arthonia lethariicola Alstrup & M.S.Cole (1998) – Canada; host: Letharia
- Arthonia leucomelodis F.Berger & E.Zimm. (2016) – host: Leucodermia leucomelos
- Arthonia ligniaria Hellb. (1884)
- Arthonia ligniariella Coppins (1989)
- Arthonia lividula Vain. (1921)
- Arthonia lobothalliae Etayo (2010) – host: Lobothallia alphoplaca

== M ==
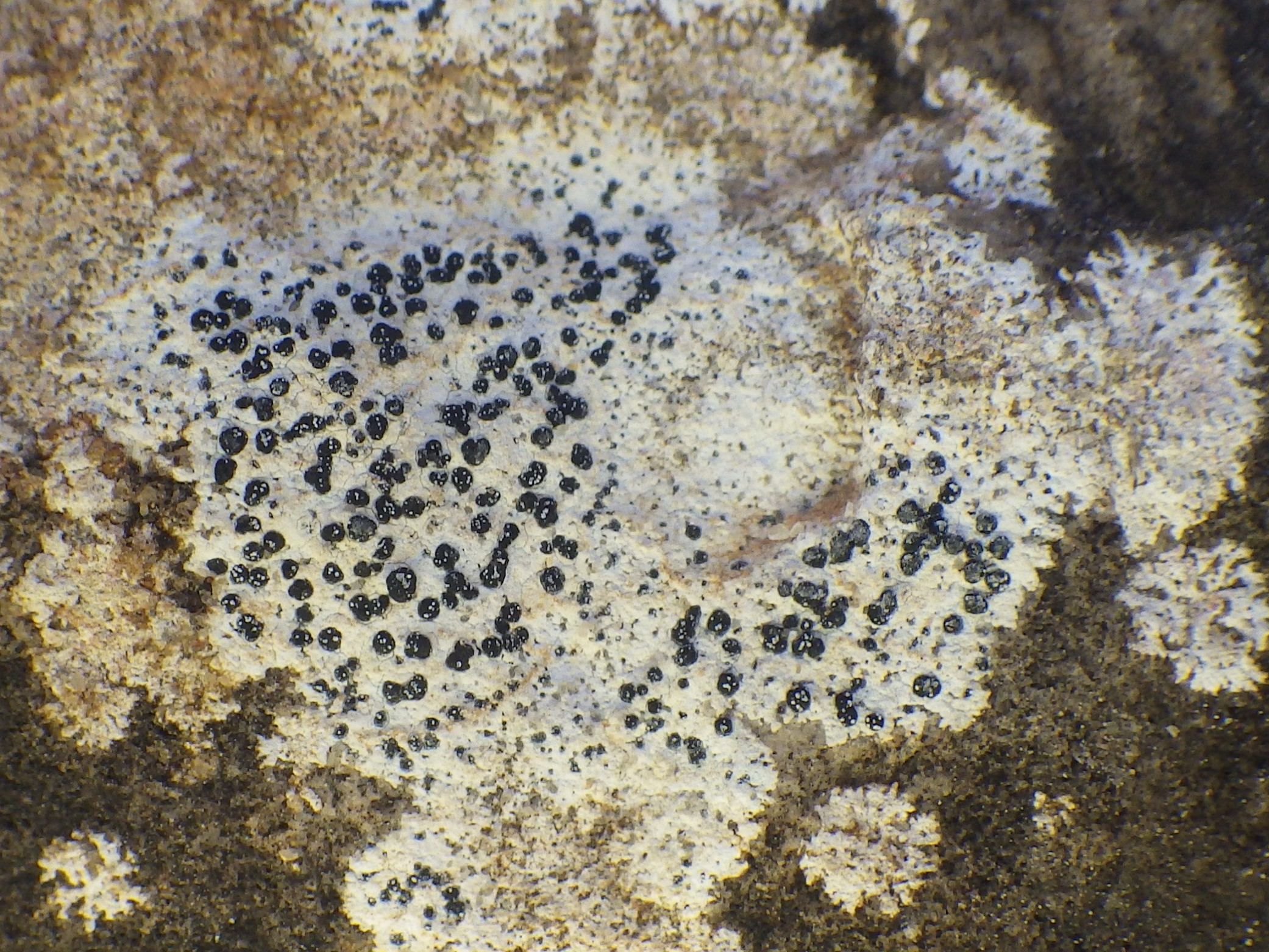
Arthonia meridionalis

- Arthonia maculiformis Wedin & Hafellner (1998) – host: Pseudocyphellaria glabra and P. homoeophylla
- Arthonia marginalis Etayo (2008) – Chile; host: Pseudocyphellaria
- Arthonia mediella Nyl. (1859)
- Arthonia meridionalis Zahlbr. (1914)
- Arthonia microsperma Nyl. (1887)
- Arthonia minor (Lücking) Lücking (2021)
- Arthonia mirabilis Grube (2007)
- Arthonia miserula Nyl. (1863)
- Arthonia montagnei (Tuck.) R.C.Harris (1990)
- Arthonia myriocarpella Nyl. (1863)

== N ==
- Arthonia navasiana Etayo (2010) – host: Lepraria
- Arthonia nigratula (Müll.Arg.) R.Sant. (1952)
- Arthonia nigrorufa Müll.Arg. (1893)
- Arthonia novaecaledoniae Lücking & Kalb (2001) – New Caledonia
- Arthonia nymphaeoides C.Knight (1882)

== O ==
- Arthonia obscurior Triebel (1989) – Greenland; host: Pilophorus dovrensis
- Arthonia oligospora Vězda (1973) – Bulgaria; host: Myriolecis crenulata
- Arthonia orchidicida Aptroot (2011)

== P ==
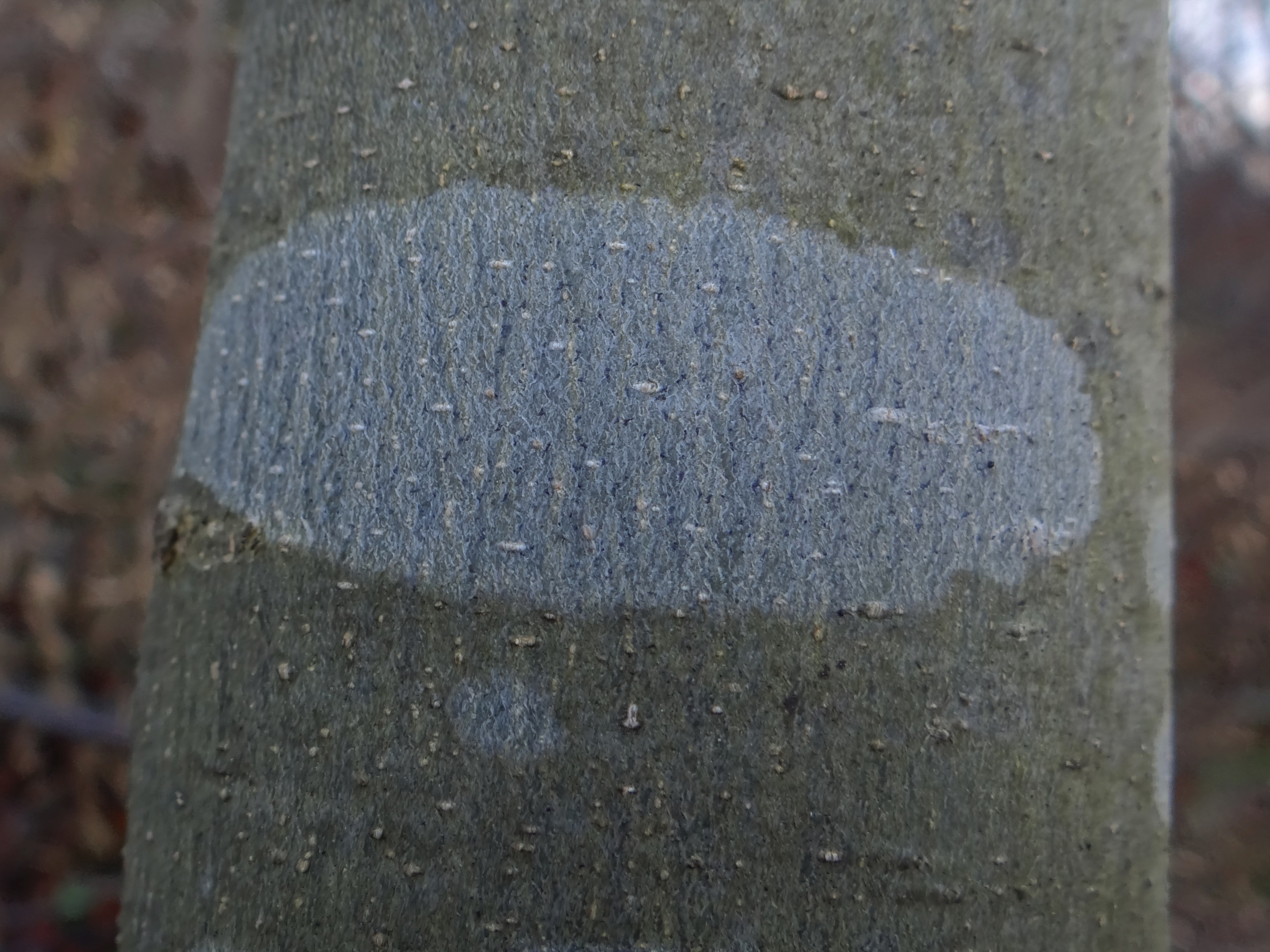
Arthonia punctiformis

- Arthonia palmulacea (Müll.Arg.) R.Sant. (1952)
- Arthonia pannariae Zhurb. & Grube (2010) – hosts: Protopannaria pezizoides and Psoroma hypnorum
- Arthonia pantherina Etayo (1993) – Spain; host: Pertusaria pustulata
- Arthonia parantillarum Aptroot (2003)
- Arthonia patellulata Nyl. (1853)
- Arthonia peltigerae Th.Fr. (1866) – Peltigera and Solorina
- Arthonia pepei Etayo & Pérez-Ort. (2016) – Europe; host: Parmelina
- Arthonia peraffinis Nyl. (1861)
- Arthonia perparva (Zahlbr.) Matzer (1996)
- Arthonia phaeobaea (Norman) Norman (1869)
- Arthonia phlyctiformis Nyl. (1853)
- Arthonia physcidiicola Frisch & G.Thor (2013) – Africa; host: Physcidia wrightii
- Arthonia plectocarpoides (S.Y.Kondr., D.J.Galloway & D.Hawksw.) Wedin & S.Y.Kondr. (1997) – host: Pseudocyphellaria scabrosa
- Arthonia pocsii Lücking & Kalb (2002) – Africa
- Arthonia polia Etayo & R.Sant. (2010) – host: Diploicia canescens
- Arthonia polydactylonis Diederich & Ertz (2018) – host: Peltigera polydactylon
- Arthonia portuensis van den Boom (2021)
- Arthonia pragensis Horáková (1994) – Europe; host: Caloplaca teicholyta
- Arthonia prominens Follmann (2003) – South America; host: Pentagenella gracillima
- Arthonia propinqua Nyl. (1863)
- Arthonia protoparmeliae Etayo (2010) – host: Protoparmelia badia
- Arthonia protoparmeliopsidis Etayo & Diederich (2009) – Western Europe; host: Protoparmeliopsis muralis
- Arthonia pruinascens (Zahlbr.) Grube (2007)
- Arthonia pseudocyphellariae Wedin (1993) – host: Pseudocyphellaria multifida
- Arthonia pseudopegraphina Matzer (1996) – Brazil; host: foliicolous Mazosia
- Arthonia pseudostromatica Seavey & J.Seavey (2017) – USA
- Arthonia punctella Nyl. (1859) – host: Diplotomma
- Arthonia punctiformis Ach. (1808)

== R ==
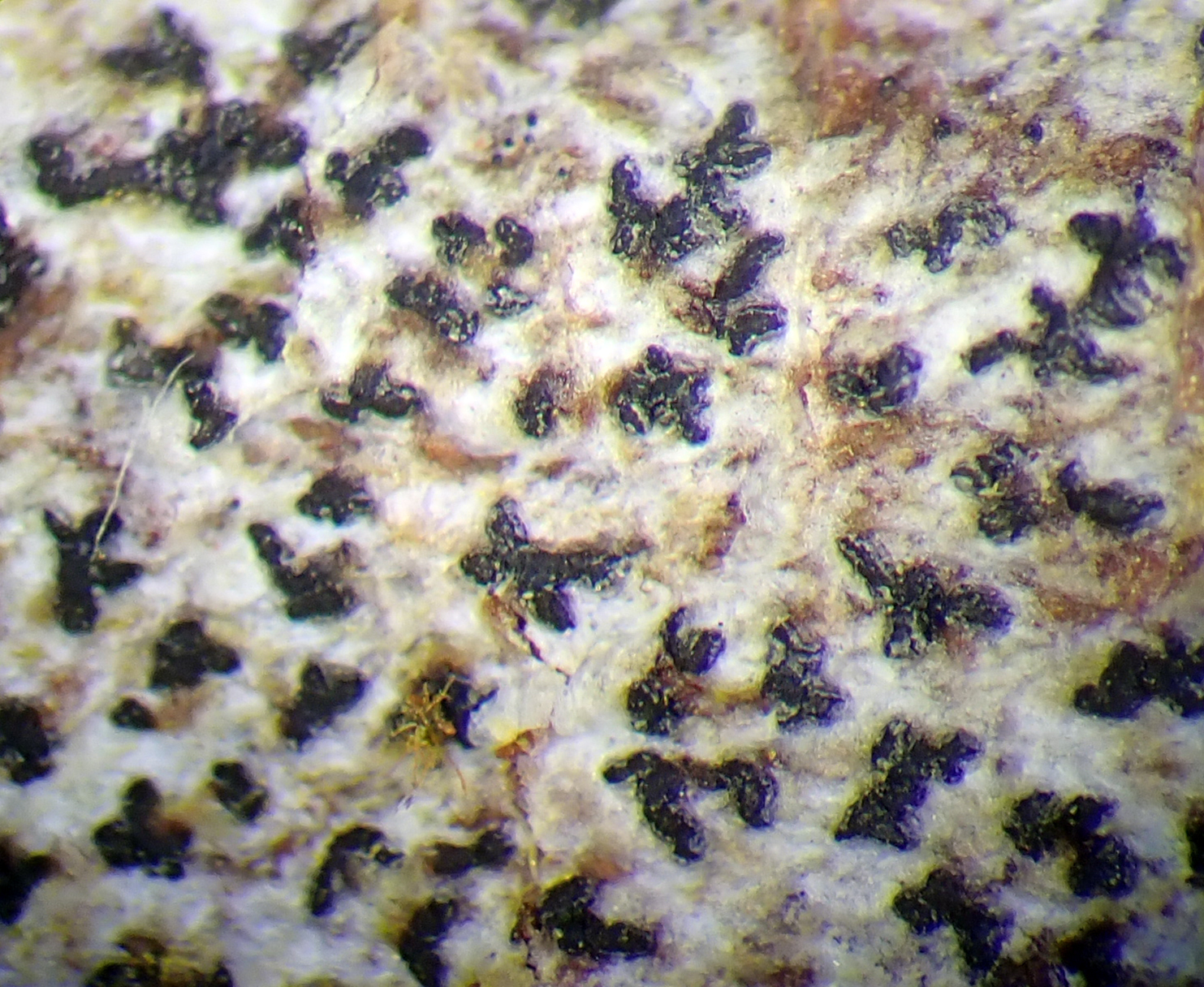
Arthonia radiata

- Arthonia radiata (Pers.) Ach. (1808)
- Arthonia punctilliformis Leight. (1876)
- Arthonia rangiformicola Brackel & Etayo (2015) – host: Cladonia rangiformis
- Arthonia redingeri Grube (2007)
- Arthonia rimularum (Wedd.) Monnat & Cl.Roux (2020)
- Arthonia rinodinicola Candan & Halıcı (2009) – Turkey; host: Rinodina oleae
- Arthonia rubella (Fée) Nyl. (1856)
- Arthonia rubrocincta G.Merr. ex Grube & Lendemer (2009)
- Arthonia rufidula (Hue) D.Hawksw., R.Sant. & Øvstedal (1991)

== S ==
- Arthonia sagenidii Vězda & Kantvilas (1992) – Tasmania; host: Lecanactis mollis
- Arthonia samdykeana Lendemer & D.Ray (2017)
- Arthonia sampaianae (Diederich & Etayo) Ertz & Diederich (2005) – host: Nevesia sampaiana
- Arthonia sanguinaria Frisch & Y.Ohmura (2018) – Japan
- Arthonia santessoniana Wedin & Hafellner (1998)
- Arthonia santessonii Matzer (1996)
- Arthonia saxistellata Aptroot & Cáceres (2018) – Brazil; host: Pseudocyphellaria scabrosa
- Arthonia semi-immersa Wedin & Hafellner (1998) – host: Pseudocyphellaria
- Arthonia sherparum Grube & Matzer (1997) – Nepal; host: Lecanora sherparum
- Arthonia sororiella (Müll.Arg.) Ertz (2009)
- Arthonia speciosa (Müll.Arg.) Grube (2007)
- Arthonia squamarinae Etayo (2008) – host: Squamarina
- Arthonia stellaris Kremp. (1861)
- Arthonia stevensoniana R.C.Harris & Lendemer (2016) – host: Haematomma accolens
- Arthonia stictaria Nyl. (1867) – Pseudocyphellaria
- Arthonia stipitata M.M.E.Alves, Aptroot & M.Cáceres (2014) – Brazil; host: unidentified sterile, sorediate, corticolous lichen
- Arthonia subaggregata Wedin & Hafellner (1998) – host: Pseudocyphellaria hirsuta
- Arthonia subantarctica Øvstedal (1986)
- Arthonia subclemens Hafellner, Grube & Muggia (2023) – Italy; host: Lecanora polytropa
- Arthonia subcondita Stirt. (1899)
- Arthonia subconveniens Nyl. (1867) – host: Lobaria
- Arthonia subfuscicola (Linds.) Triebel (1991) – host: Lecanora albella and L. carpinea
- Arthonia subgraphidicola Ertz, Common & Diederich (2019)
- Arthonia subgyrosa Nyl. (1869)
- Arthonia superpallens B.G.Lee & J.S.Hur (2016) – South Korea
- Arthonia susa R.C.Harris & Lendemer (2013) – USA
- Arthonia sytnikii S.Y.Kondr. (1996) – Australia; host: Dufourea

== T ==
- Arthonia tabescens (Anzi) Jatta (1900) – host: Parmelia saxatilis
- Arthonia tasmanica Kantvilas & Vězda (1992) – Tasmania
- Arthonia tavaresii Grube & Hafellner (1995) – Canary Islands; host: Anthracothecium and Pyrenula
- Arthonia tetraspora S.Y.Kondr. & Kärnefelt (2002) – host: Caloplaca chilensis
- Arthonia thelotrematis Coppins (1989) – host: Thelotrema
- Arthonia thoriana Ertz & Sanderson (2018)
- Arthonia thozetiana Müll.Arg. (1882)
- Arthonia toensbergii Holien & Frisch (2018) – Europe; host: Mycoblastus affinis
- Arthonia tremelloides Etayo (2002) – host: Heterodermia
- Arthonia triebeliae Zhurb. (2002) – Arctic; host: Dactylina
- Arthonia trifurcata (Hepp ex Müll.Arg.) Cl.Roux (2014)
- Arthonia trilocularis Müll.Arg. (1881)

== U ==
- Arthonia ulleungdoensis B.G.Lee & Hur (2019) – South Korea
- Arthonia urceolata (Elenkin) Calat., Barreno & V.J.Rico (2004) – host: Aspicilia

== V ==
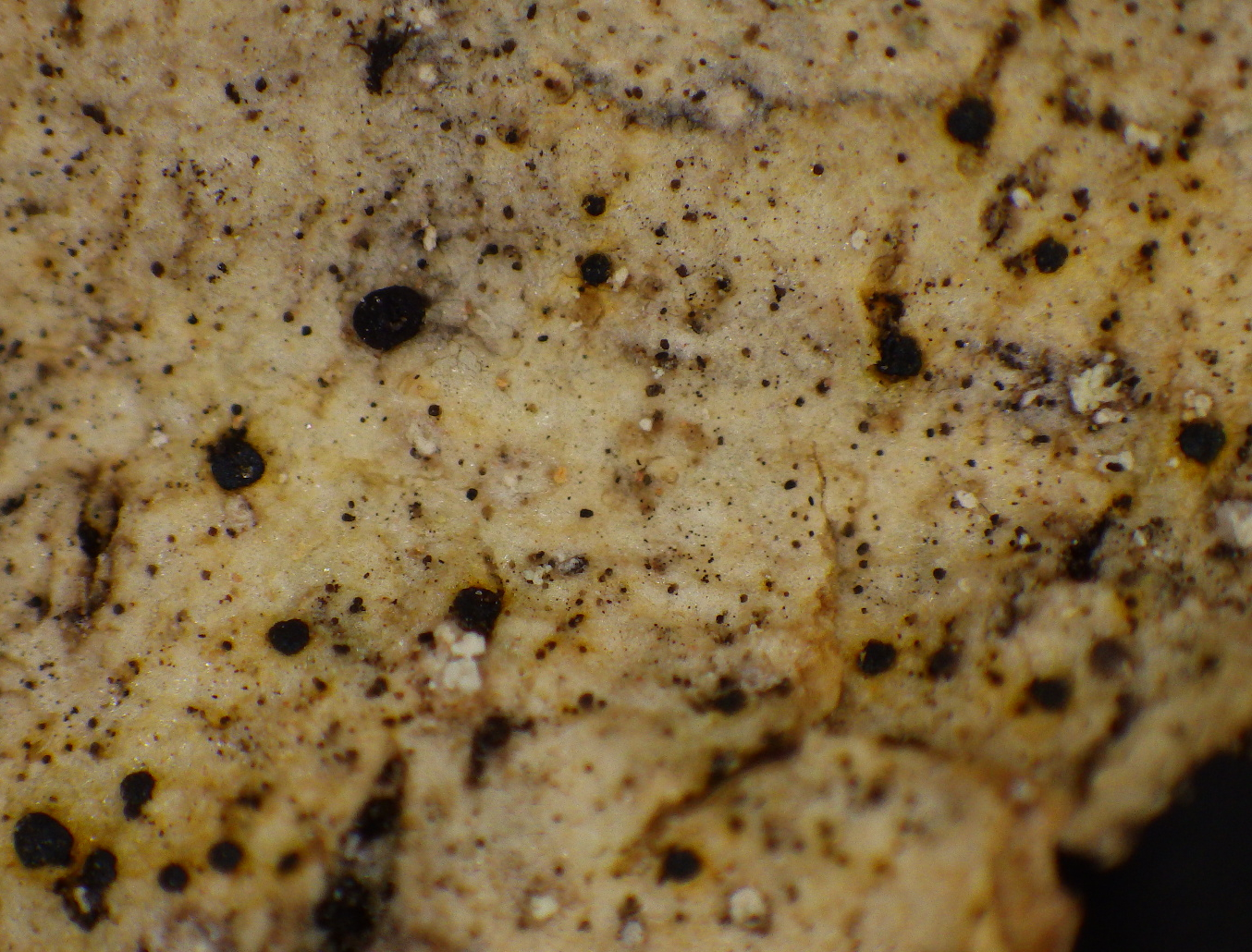
Arthonia vinosa

- Arthonia varians (Davies) Nyl. (1861) – hosts: Glaucomaria rupicola, G. bicincta, G. swartzii, Lecanora helicopis and Lecanora rupicola
- Arthonia vinosa Leight. (1856)
- Arthonia vorsoeensis Alstrup (2004) – Europe; host: Amandinea punctata

== W ==
- Arthonia willeyi Tuck. (1933)

== X ==
- Arthonia xanthoparmeliarum Etayo (2008) – Chile; host: Xanthoparmelia
- Arthonia xanthopycnidiata Aptroot (2023) – Brazil
- Arthonia xylogena (Ellis & Everh.) M.E.Barr (1993)
- Arthonia xylographica Nyl. (1885)
- Arthonia xylophila V.Wirth & P.James (1975) – Europe

== Z ==
- Arthonia zelkovae B.G.Lee & J.S.Hur (2016) – South Korea
