= Arthonia pannariae =

Scientific classification
- Kingdom: Fungi
- Division: Ascomycota
- Class: Arthoniomycetes
- Order: Arthoniales
- Family: Arthoniaceae
- Genus: Arthonia
- Species: A. pannariae

Binomial name
- Arthonia pannariae Zhurb. & Grube (2010)

Species of fungus

Arthonia pannariae is a species of lichen-dwelling fungus in the family Arthoniaceae. It was described in 2010 from material collected in northern Norway, with additional specimens known from arctic Russia and Greenland. The fungus infects soil-dwelling lichens of the family Pannariaceae, where it colonizes the spore-producing tissues of the host's fruiting bodies, often visibly bleaching or destroying them. Its known distribution spans the northern Holarctic, mainly in tundra and polar desert environments, though a 2025 report extended the range to Papua New Guinea.

== Taxonomy ==
Arthonia pannariae was described as a new species in 2010 by Mikhail Zhurbenko and Martin Grube, based on material collected in northern Norway and compared with additional specimens from arctic Russia and Greenland. The type specimen was collected in Troms county (Skibotndalen Valley, between Luhcajavri and Stuoraoaivi) at 700 m elevation, growing mainly on the hymenium of Protopannaria pezizoides apothecia. The specific epithet pannariae refers to the Pannariaceae, the family of the host lichens.

The authors placed the species in the Arthonia radiata group, and compared it most closely with Arthonia clemens and A. vagans var. lecanorina. They separated A. pannariae from A. clemens in the strict sense (sensu stricto) by its more often pigmented hymenium, longer asci (typically 33–43 × 12–16 μm), narrower ascospores (typically 9.5–12.5 × 3.5–4.5 μm), and by its host choice (Protopannaria and Psoroma rather than lichens such as Rhizoplaca). In discussing host associations, they suggested that a broad concept of A. clemens likely merges multiple host-specific taxa, and that A. clemens sensu stricto may be restricted to Rhizoplaca.

== Description ==
Arthonia pannariae grows as colourless, branching hyphae that form a dense network within the host's hymenium. Its fruiting bodies are black (sometimes with a brown tinge), dull to slightly glossy, and may occur singly but more often merge into crowded, composite apothecia up to 2 mm across; these range from moderately convex to lumpy and warted (tuberculate). Microscopically, the uppermost layer of the spore-bearing region (epihymenium) is distinct and grey-olive to brown-olive, about 10 μm tall, while the spore-bearing layer itself (hymenium) is 40–50 μm tall and ranges from pale olive-brown (especially near the top) to nearly colourless. The subhymenium is indistinct, and the underlying hypothecium may reach 150 μm in height. In iodine-based tests the hymenial tissues show diagnostic colour reactions, staining red in iodine and blue after pretreatment with KOH.

The paraphyses are mostly unbranched in their lower portions but become more branched and wavy above, with pigmented, slightly to strongly swollen upper cells that lack a distinct pigment cap. The asci are club-shaped (clavate), often with a short stalk, and consistently contain eight spores. The asci typically measure 33–43 × 12–16 μm, though extremes of roughly 28–48 × 11–20 μm have been recorded. The ascospores are colourless (hyaline), smooth, and divided by a single cross-wall (1-septate), often with a gently "sole-shaped" outline in which the upper cell is the broader of the two. They typically measure 9.5–12.5 × 3.5–4.5 μm, with occasional extremes of about 7.5–15.0 × 3.0–5.0 μm, and lack a gelatinous sheath. No asexual reproductive stage (anamorph) has been reported.

== Habitat and distribution ==
Arthonia pannariae is a lichenicolous fungus that parasitizes soil-dwelling lichens in the Pannariaceae, especially Protopannaria pezizoides and Psoroma hypnorum. It occurs mainly on the hymenium of the host's apothecia, but it may also be found on thalline apothecial margins and, more rarely, directly on the thallus. Infected apothecia are often visibly affected: the host hymenium is commonly bleached and can be partly or completely destroyed by the fungus.

The species is known from the northern Holarctic, where it has been recorded in polar desert and tundra bioclimatic zones, as well as alpine tundra within the boreal zone. Published records include northern Norway (Troms), arctic Russia (including Franz Josef Land, the Severnaya Zemlya archipelago, the Taymyr Peninsula, parts of Yakutiya, and Wrangel Island), Kolguyev Island, and Greenland. Although its distribution generally appears to follow that of its host lichens in open, cold-region habitats, it was reported as new to Papua New Guinea and to Oceania in 2025 based on specimens examined in the TNS herbarium (National Museum of Nature and Science, Japan).

== See also ==
- List of Arthonia species
