= Arthonia cohabitans =

Scientific classification
- Kingdom: Fungi
- Division: Ascomycota
- Class: Arthoniomycetes
- Order: Arthoniales
- Family: Arthoniaceae
- Genus: Arthonia
- Species: A. cohabitans

Binomial name
- Arthonia cohabitans Coppins (1989)

Species of fungus

Arthonia cohabitans is a species of lichenicolous (lichen-dwelling) fungus in the family Arthoniaceae. The fungus forms minute brown-black flecks that develop beneath the bark surface but soon break through and become visible, typically measuring less than 0.2 mm across or forming elongated structures up to about 0.3–0.4 mm long. It produces small ascospores that start out colourless and smooth but later become brown and finely textured, with the upper cell larger than the lower.

== Taxonomy ==
Arthonia cohabitans was described as new by Brian Coppins in 1989. It lives within the thallus of the bark-dwelling lichen Arthothelium reagens and appears to be commensalistic or only weakly parasitic, usually leaving the host largely unaffected and only rarely producing small necrotic patches. In overall form it is close to the lichenised Arthonia didyma, but A. cohabitans can be separated by its smaller ascospores. Coppins treated the species as best regarded as commensalistic rather than truly parasitic, in accordance with its limited impact on the host thallus.

== Description ==
The fungus forms minute, brown-black, pruina-lacking apothecia that develop beneath the bark surface but soon break through and become visible as small flecks. The apothecia are rounded, typically 0.06–0.16 mm across, or elongate, reaching about 0.4 mm long and 0.08–0.1 mm wide. In cross section they are usually 60–70 μm tall, with a yellow-orange pigment that gives a K+ (purple) staining reaction; the hymenium is iodine-positive (I+ blue).

Microscopically, the asci are club-shaped (clavate), 8-spored, and about 30–35 × 12–14 μm. The ascospores have a single septum (1-septate) and measure 10.5–14 × 4–5 μm. They are oblong-ovoid to oblong-ellipsoid (sometimes slightly sole-shaped when constricted at the septum], with the upper cell broader and longer than the lower. Spores are initially hyaline and smooth, but later become brown and finely warted; a thin epispore may sometimes be visible in potassium hydroxide solution. Pycnidia (asexual reproductive structures) were not reported in the original description, but were later observed in Scottish material as small brown structures (about 30–50 μm) producing rod-shaped (bacilliform) conidia about 5 × 1 μm.

=== Similar species ===
Arthonia cohabitans belongs to a small group of lichenicolous species in which the tissue beneath the spore-bearing layer (hypothecium) is brown and may show coloured reactions in potassium hydroxide. In this respect it resembles Arthonia pragensis, described from diabase rocks in Prague. However, A. pragensis differs in having distinctly larger ascospores (typically 13–18.5 μm long, occasionally reaching 20 μm, and 5.5–8 μm wide) and in producing an orange-red to vinaceous reaction of the hypothecium in KOH. Its asci have a double-walled structure (fissitunicate) and are broadly egg-shaped (obovate), and the spores are colourless (hyaline) and smooth-walled at maturity. In contrast, A. cohabitans has shorter and narrower ascospores (10.5–14 × 4–5 μm); the upper cell is broader and longer than the lower one, and the spores become brown and finely warted when mature.

Arthonia neglectula is another species with a superficially similar habit, but it has much smaller ascospores (8–10 × 3–3.5 μm), a coal-black epithecium, and occurs on different host genera. The lichenicolous Arthonia peltigerae shares a comparable spore size and hypothecial pigmentation with A. pragensis, but grows on species of Peltigera and Solorina, and therefore differs ecologically from the corticolous, commensalistic A. cohabitans. Collectively, these distinctions in spore dimensions, pigmentation, host preference, and chemical reactions provide the most reliable means of separating A. cohabitans from other lichenicolous members of the genus.

Arthonia cohabitans is similar to other lichenicolous species with 1-septate spores and K+ purplish pigments in the epithecioid layer, but can be separated by its spore dimensions and host preference. Arthonia diorygmae has similarly sized 1-septate ascospores ((13–)14–15(–21) × 5–7 μm) and a K+ (purplish) epithecioid layer, but differs in its immersed to erumpent ascomata with a slightly whitish pruinose disc, larger asci (40–57 × 10–18 μm), a distinct perispore, and its occurrence on Diorygma junghuhnii (Graphidaceae). In contrast, A. cohabitans lacks a distinct epithecioid layer in mature ascomata, has an indistinct parathecioid layer and a yellowish-brown ascigerous region, and is commensalistic on Arthothelium (reported on Arthothelium macounii).

== Habitat and distribution ==
Arthonia cohabitans has been recorded growing within the thallus of Arthothelium reagens on hazel (Corylus) bark. The type locality is on the Isle of Seil (Argyll, Scotland), at Ballachuan, Port Mòr, where it was collected in August 1980 (holotype in BM, with topotypes in E and UPS). Although Arthothelium reagens occurs at a few other sites in western Scotland, Coppins reported that A. cohabitans had not been detected in those additional collections of the host. A later account noted that it occurs in strongly oceanic habitats in Scotland. A Scottish Natural Heritage review of priority lichens classed A. cohabitans as an Atlantic hazelwood specialist and noted that it was known from two post-1960 occupied 10 km squares in Scotland.

In India, Arthonia cohabitans has been reported from Uttarakhand on the thallus of Caloplaca cerina, but a later review treated this record as doubtful, noting that A. cohabitans is typically associated with Arthothelium macounii and suggesting the Indian material may represent a different species (possibly Bryostigma molendoi).

== See also ==
- List of Arthonia species
