= Arthonia anglica =

Scientific classification
- Kingdom: Fungi
- Division: Ascomycota
- Class: Arthoniomycetes
- Order: Arthoniales
- Family: Arthoniaceae
- Genus: Arthonia
- Species: A. anglica

Binomial name
- Arthonia anglica Coppins (1989)

Species of lichen-forming fungus

Arthonia anglica is a species of lichen-forming fungus in the family Arthoniaceae. The lichen forms grey-white to pale fawn patches on tree bark, bounded by a dark brown line, and is mostly embedded within the outer bark layer. Its reproductive structures are numerous star-shaped to irregularly star-shaped features that are pale to dark reddish-brown and can reach up to 12 mm across in the largest groupings. The species occurs on mature hardwood trees in long-established woodlands, recorded from beech and holly in Britain, and from various hardwoods including maple and hornbeam in eastern North America.

== Taxonomy ==
Arthonia anglica was described as new to science by Brian Coppins, based on British material collected on beech bark in southern England. In its irregularly star-shaped apothecia and spore form, it resembles Arthonia astroidestra and Arthonia stellaris, but it is set apart by the presence of gyrophoric acid restricted to the apothecia (seen as a C+ red reaction in section), and by lacking the UV fluorescence associated with lichexanthone in A. astroidestra. It also differs from A. astroidestra in having apothecia that are not pruinose (i.e., lacking a powdery coating).

The type material bears the label "St. Leonard's, Jan. 1806" and is likely to have come from the former St Leonard's Forest near Horsham (West Sussex), an area closely associated with the botanist William Borrer, who was probably the collector of the specimen used for the description. In North America, material now referred to A. anglica was first recognised in the Ozark Highlands and circulated under the manuscript name Arthonia "dryadum". After the species was found in comparable habitats in the southern Appalachians and across the coastal plain and piedmont of the southeastern United States, a specimen was sent to Brian Coppins for comparison with British material; he confirmed that the North American collections were the same taxon as A. anglica, leading to the first published report of the species from the continent. Molecular work on Arthoniaceae has also shown that Arthonia in the broad sense is heterogeneous, and an mtSSU phylogeny including A. anglica places it in a lineage separate from the core Arthonia group around A. radiata.

== Description ==
The thallus is mainly embedded in the outer bark (endophloeodal), grey-white to pale fawn, and forms circular to elliptic patches at least 6×3 cm, each bounded by a dark brown hypothalline line. In microscopic preparations the hyphae stain blue with iodine. Standard spot tests on the thallus are negative (K−, C−, KC−, PD−, UV−).

The apothecia are numerous and often crowded, forming elongated, slit-like structures (lirellae) that are usually irregularly star-shaped (substellate), only occasionally neatly stellate, and reaching up to 12 mm across in the largest aggregates. The individual "arms" are narrow (about 0.08–0.16 mm wide) and pale to dark reddish-brown, without pruina. Microscopically, the apothecia are 80–130 μm tall. The epithecium is reddish-brown and turns olivaceous with K, while the hymenium is hyaline and iodine-positive (I+ blue). The asci are clavate and eight-spored, with only a minute amyloid ring at the apex, and the ascospores are typically 17–24×6–8 μm, 3–4-septate, and macrocephalic (with the upper cell larger than the lower). North American collections have been reported with slightly smaller spores, about 15–22 × 5–7 μm, while retaining the same general spore form and chemistry. Spores are hyaline and smooth when young, but older spores develop brown, granular warting. Pycnidia have not been observed. The species is lichenized with the green alga Trentepohlia as its photobiont.

Chemically, the diagnostic feature is gyrophoric acid confined to the apothecia, detectable as a C+ (red) reaction in apothecial sections.

== Habitat and distribution ==
In Britain, Arthonia anglica has been found on the bark of mature trees in long-established woodland, recorded from trunks or main branches of beech (Fagus) and holly (Ilex). The few known gatherings include material from southern England, with a modern collection reported from North Devon on holly in cliff woodland, and an older record from the New Forest area on holly. In Spain, A. anglica has been reported from Galicia, where it was collected on Alnus glutinosa and represents the first record for the Iberian Peninsula. The only earlier Spanish report was from La Gomera in the Canary Islands.

In eastern North America, A. anglica has been recorded mainly from humid, mesic hardwood forests, especially in streamside woodlands in the Ozark region. It has been collected on the bark of hardwoods including maple (Acer) and hornbeam (Carpinus), and has also been found at middle to low elevations in the southern Appalachian Mountains as well as in the coastal plain and piedmont of the southeastern United States. It has also been recorded in Virginia and Wisconsin.

The species appears to have a very southern British distribution and has so far been confirmed from only a small number of collections. On the British material examined, it occurred alongside a typical assemblage of bark-dwelling lichens, including Arthonia cinnabarina, Graphis elegans, Opegrapha vulgata (sensu auct.), and Pertusaria hymenea, among others. Coppins suggested that it might also occur in suitable habitats elsewhere in south-west Europe.

== See also ==
- List of Arthonia species
