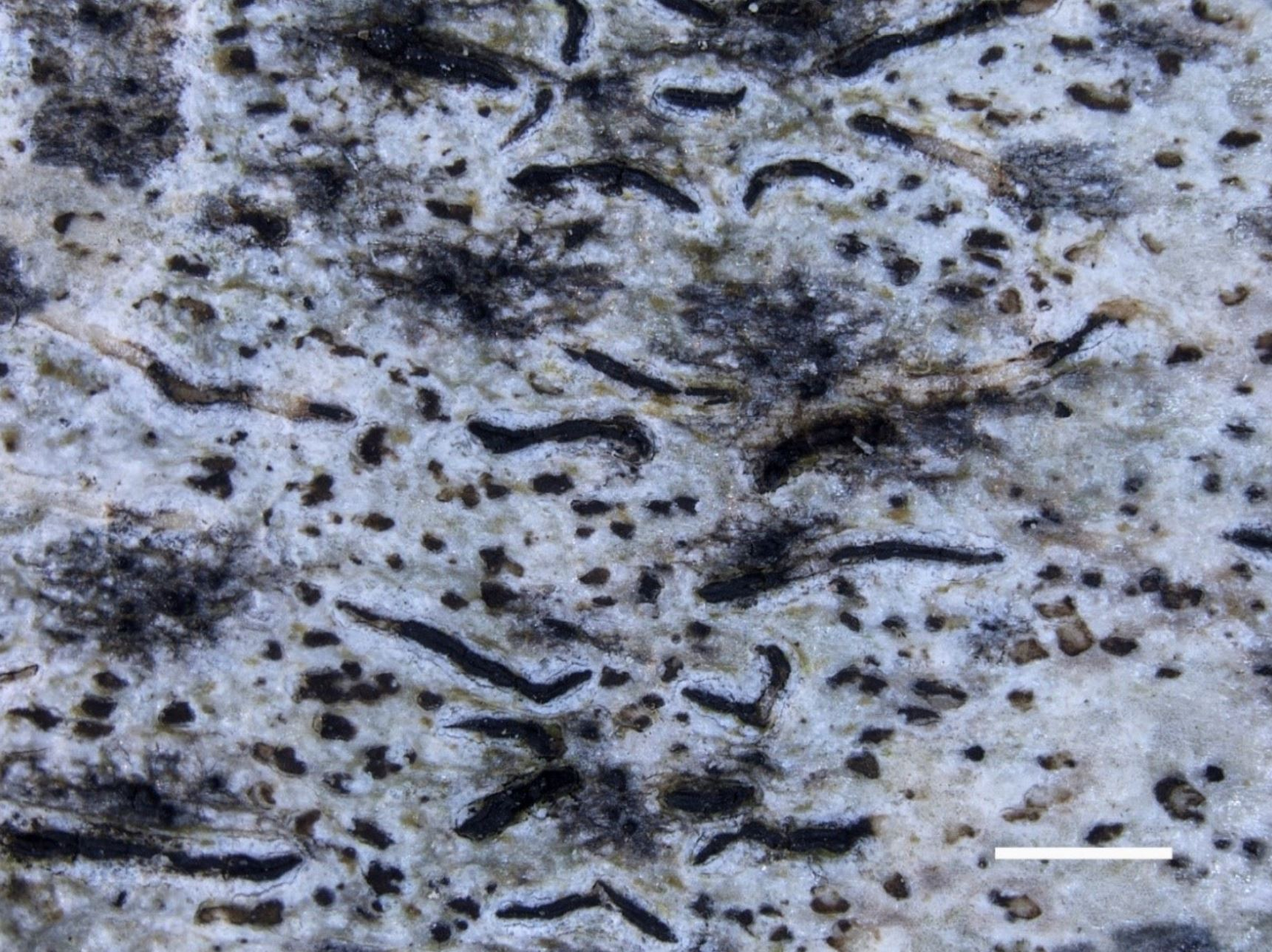
- Arthonia graphidicola visible as dark spots among the lirellae of the script lichen Graphis scripta Scale: 1 mm

Scientific classification
- Kingdom: Fungi
- Division: Ascomycota
- Class: Arthoniomycetes
- Order: Arthoniales
- Family: Arthoniaceae
- Genus: Arthonia
- Species: A. graphidicola

Binomial name
- Arthonia graphidicola Coppins (1989)

= Arthonia graphidicola =

Species of fungus

Arthonia graphidicola is a species of lichen-dwelling fungus in the family Arthoniaceae. The fungus forms tiny reddish- to dark-brown flecks that initially develop beneath the bark surface before breaking through, typically measuring about 0.06–0.16 mm across or forming elongated structures up to about 0.4 mm long. It produces ascospores that are initially colourless and smooth but later become covered in dark brown granular warts, with the upper cell larger than the lower ones. The species is known from western Scotland, where it grows exclusively on the script lichen species Graphis scripta found on hazel bark in mild, oceanic districts.

== Taxonomy ==
Arthonia graphidicola was described as new to science in 1989 by Brian Coppins from western Scottish material growing within the thallus of the script lichen, Graphis scripta, on hazel (Corylus) bark. Coppins considered it to be largely commensalistic, as it appears to cause little damage to the host thallus.

The species is very similar to the related lichenicolous Arthonia thelotrematis, but can be distinguished by its longer ascospores (with little overlap in size) and by having a hyaline (colourless and translucent) hypothecium rather than a reddish-brown one.

== Description ==
Arthonia graphidicola does not form a conspicuous thallus of its own, instead developing within the thallus of Graphis scripta. The apothecia are tiny and scattered, initially developing beneath the bark surface and then breaking through as small, fleck-like fruiting bodies. They are rounded to somewhat angular, about 0.06–0.16 mm across, or elongate (often tapering to pointed ends) and up to about 0.42 mm long; they are reddish- to dark-brown and lack pruina.

Under the microscope, the apothecia are about 60–85 micrometres (μm) tall, with a reddish-brown hymenium that turns dull olivaceous in potassium hydroxide solution (K), and gives a red reaction with iodine. The hypothecium is hyaline and iodine-positive (I+ blue). The asci are clavate and 8-spored (about 35–40 × 15–17 μm), and in K/I typically show only a minute amyloid ring at the apex. The ascospores are oblong to ovoid, macrocephalic, and 2–3-septate, measuring (13–)14–17 × 4.5–5.5 μm; they are initially hyaline and smooth, but later become covered in dark brown granular warts. Pycnidia are uncommon. When present they are immersed (about 40 μm across) and produce hyaline, rod-shaped conidia around 4.5–5.5 × 0.8 μm.

Arthonia graphidicola is one of the few lichenicolous Arthonia species reported from hosts in the Graphidaceae, and it can be confused with A. diorygmae because both have hyaline ascospores of similar size (about 13–17 × 4–5.5 μm). It differs in its host and in fruiting-body characters: A. graphidicola grows on the thallus of Graphis scripta and forms very small, often cleft, fleck-like apothecia (typically 0.06–0.16 mm across, sometimes elongate), with a pale reddish-brown asciogenous layer; its ascospores are 2–3-septate and become brown and warty at maturity. A second comparable species is A. thelotrematis (on Thelotrema lepadinum), which has slightly smaller ascospores (about 11–14 × 4.5–5.0 μm) and a reddish-brown hypothecium.

== Habitat and distribution ==
In Britain, Arthonia graphidicola has been recorded only as a commensal on Graphis scripta growing on hazel (Corylus) bark. The type collection is from Benderloch (Argyll), and additional specimens were reported from other western Scottish localities, including Loch Sunart (West Inverness-shire), Seil (Argyll), and several sites on Skye (Tokovaig Wood, Kilmore hazelwood, and Coille Gaireallach). These records suggest a distribution centred on mild, oceanic districts in western Scotland, in habitats supporting well-developed populations of the host lichen on hazel.

== See also ==
- List of Arthonia species
