= Arthonia invadens =

Scientific classification
- Kingdom: Fungi
- Division: Ascomycota
- Class: Arthoniomycetes
- Order: Arthoniales
- Family: Arthoniaceae
- Genus: Arthonia
- Species: A. invadens

Binomial name
- Arthonia invadens Coppins (1989)

Species of lichen-dwelling fungus

Arthonia invadens is a species of lichen-dwelling fungus in the family Arthoniaceae. The fungus produces small, dark brown fruiting bodies that erupt through the bark surface, forming narrow star-shaped or branching patterns typically 0.2–1 mm across. It produces ascospores that are initially colourless and smooth but later become covered with brown granular warts, with the upper cell larger than the lower cells. The species is rare in Britain and Ireland, known from only a few localities including the New Forest, West Cork, and North Devon, where it grows on various hardwood trees including oak, holly, alder, and beech.

== Taxonomy ==
Arthonia invadens was described by Brian Coppins in 1989. It grows within the bark-embedded thallus of Schizotrema quercicola (then treated as Schismatomma quercicola) and is thought to be commensalistic or only weakly parasitic, because it does not form distinct patches of damage in the host.

Coppins reported that British material had previously been misidentified as Arthonia anombrophila or Arthonia stellaris because the apothecia are often star-shaped and the ascospores are similar in size and shape. Thin-layer chromatography helped resolve the confusion: the collections lacked the characteristic lichen products of those species, and instead showed fumarprotocetraric acid attributable to the host thallus. Microscopic sections also supported the interpretation that the fungus is a separate, invasive Arthonia growing in S. quercicola, rather than a previously unknown fertile form of the host. This interpretation was later supported by molecular data: sequencing from the type locality confirmed the host belongs in the Graphidaceae as Schizotrema quercicola, establishing that the arthonioid ascomata are produced by an obligately lichenicolous fungus. Sequences of A. invadens place it in the Coniocarpon–Reichlingia clade within the Arthoniaceae.

== Description ==
Arthonia invadens does not form an obvious thallus of its own, but develops inside the bark-dwelling thallus of Schizotrema quercicola. Its apothecia begin beneath the bark surface and soon burst through, becoming visible as dark brown, unpowdered fruiting bodies that are linear or (more often) star-shaped to starry-dendritic. The larger apothecia are about 0.2–1 mm across, with very narrow "arms" (typically 0.03–0.1 mm wide).

Under the microscope, the apothecia are about 54–60 micrometres (μm) tall and are iodine-positive (I+ blue). The epithecium is red-brown and turns olive-green in K, and the hymenium is mostly hyaline (sometimes faintly reddish-brown in places). The asci are clavate to saccate, 8-spored, and show only a minute amyloid ring at the apex in K/I. The ascospores measure 11–15(–17) × 4–6 μm and are 2–3-septate, macrocephalic (bigger on one side), and oblong to ovoid. Spores are initially colourless and smooth (often with a thin epispore visible in K), but later become covered with brown granular warts. Pycnidia are uncommon. When present they are immersed and produce simple, rod-shaped conidia about 3.8–5 × 0.8 μm.

== Habitat and distribution ==
Arthonia invadens has been recorded in association with Schizotrema quercicola on the bark of trees, where the host forms a bark-embedded thallus with scattered PD+ (red) soralia (powdery reproductive areas). The type collection is from the New Forest (Brinken Wood, South Hampshire), where it was found on oak bark in February 1971 (holotype in E; isotype in UPS).

Coppins also reported additional British material from another New Forest locality, and an Irish record from West Cork (Glengariff), where it was collected on holly. On the evidence available in 1989, it appeared to be rare and known from only a small number of collections. A later field record from December 2009 reported Arthonia invadens at Dunsland Park SSSI in North Devon, where it was found parasitising Schizotrema quercicola on three trees (one alder and two beech) in humid woodland within parkland. The same source treated the record as an extension of the species' known range and described it as Near Threatened and a UK Biodiversity Action Plan (BAP) species.

== See also ==
- List of Arthonia species
