= Arthonia toensbergii =

Scientific classification
- Kingdom: Fungi
- Division: Ascomycota
- Class: Arthoniomycetes
- Order: Arthoniales
- Family: Arthoniaceae
- Genus: Arthonia
- Species: A. toensbergii

Binomial name
- Arthonia toensbergii Holien & Frisch (2018)
- Holotype: Meldal Municipality, Norway

Species of lichen

Arthonia toensbergii is a species of lichenicolous (lichen-dwelling) fungus in the family Arthoniaceae. It occurs in old-growth boreal rainforests in Norway, where it parasitises the lichen Mycoblastus affinis growing on trunks and branches of Norway spruce.

== Taxonomy ==
The fungus was formally described as a new species in 2018 by the lichenologists Håkon Holien and Andreas Frisch. The type specimen was collected by Holien along the rover Svorka in Meldal Municipality in Sør-Trøndelag county (now part of Orkland Municipality), where it was found growing on Picea abies twigs in an old spruce forest. The species epithet honours the Norwegian lichenologist Tor Tønsberg, on the occasion of his 70th birthday.

Molecular phylogenetics analysis shows that Arthonia toensbergii has a sister taxon relationship with the rare Scandinavian species Arthonia protoparmeliae, and that these two species form a clade that is itself sister to a clade containing Arthonia peltigera and Bryostigma muscigenum. All of these species are members of the so-called Bryostigma clade, which includes many lichenicolous Arthoniaceae.

== Description ==
Arthonia toensbergii may cause pale brownish discolouration on the thallus of its host. The vegetative hyphae are thick-walled, measuring around 2–3 μm wide and 0.5–1.0 μm thick, and have specific chemical reactions (I+ vinose, KI+ pale blue). These hyphae are present in the host thallus near the ascomata. The ascomata form in small, non-aggregated colonies, with an irregularly rounded to short elliptical shape. They are adnate, moderately to strongly convex, and do not break through the host thallus. The ascomata are brownish-black to black with a matte finish and have a minutely roughened surface, measuring 0.07–0.15 mm in diameter and 0.07–0.1 mm in height.

The proper exciple, epithecium, hymenium, and hypothecium all feature a medium olivish-brown colouration. The proper exciple is composed of compacted paraphysoidal hyphae, while the hymenium is conglutinated and 35–40 μm tall, with distantly spaced asci. Paraphysoids are loosely branched, netted, and embedded in a dense gelatinous matrix, with tips that widen and have dark brownish pigment granules or plaques. The asci are broadly clavate (club-shaped), contain eight spores in irregular rows, and have a broadly triangular ocular chamber. The ascospores are hyaline (translucent), contain a single septum, and slipper-shaped, measuring around 12.6 by 4.7 μm on average. They are constricted at the septa, with thin walls and a narrow, smooth perispore. No pycnidia were observed to occur in this species.

== See also ==
- List of Arthonia species
