= Arthonia orchidicida =

Scientific classification
- Kingdom: Fungi
- Division: Ascomycota
- Class: Arthoniomycetes
- Order: Arthoniales
- Family: Arthoniaceae
- Genus: Arthonia
- Species: A. orchidicida

Binomial name
- Arthonia orchidicida Aptroot (2011)

Species of lichen-forming fungus

Arthonia orchidicida is a species of lichen-forming fungus in the family Arthoniaceae. It forms a whitish-grey crust of small granules on living leaves and is unusual among lichens in being an economic pest. The species was described in 2011 after it was found growing on cultivated orchids in a Dutch greenhouse, where it can reduce plant vitality and affect the appearance of plants for sale. Its geographic origin is uncertain, but it may have been introduced on orchids imported from the tropics.

== Taxonomy ==
Arthonia orchidicida was described as new to science in 2011 by the lichenologist André Aptroot, after it was found growing on cultivated orchids in a Dutch orchid nursery greenhouse. The species epithet orchidicida refers to its association with orchids, where it can behave as a troublesome "pest" growth rather than an incidental lichen.

The type material was collected in the Netherlands (province of Utrecht), at Hollandsche Rading, from living leaves of Dendrobium (reported as Dendrobium delicatulum) in a greenhouse. In the original account, Aptroot compared the new species with Arthonia muscigena, noting that the general appearance of the fruiting bodies and internal anatomy are similar, but that a set of consistent differences supports recognition as a distinct species.

== Description ==
Dendrobium × delicatum, a hybrid orchid cultivated in greenhouses

The thallus (lichen body) is foliicolous (growing on leaves) and whitish grey. It is made up of irregular, flattened, corticate granules that sit on an inconspicuous to pale brown hypothallus, and it contains a coccoid (round-celled) algal photobiont.

The sexual fruiting bodies (apothecia) are numerous, dark brown to black, and spherical to slightly flattened, sitting on the thallus surface; they are about 0.1–0.3 mm in diameter. The epihymenium is olive-brown and becomes more intensely coloured in K (potassium hydroxide). Inside, the hamathecium is clear (not inspersed) and gives a reddish reaction with IKI (iodine–potassium iodide), while the hypothecium is dark brown and turns olive in K. The asci are nearly spherical and often lie loose in the hymenial tissue. Each ascus contains eight ascospores, which are hyaline, club-shaped (clavate), contain a single septum, and measure about 9–11 × 3–5 μm, with the septum set well above the middle of the spore.

Asexual fruiting bodies (pycnidia) are also abundant. They are dark brown, globose to cylindrical (sometimes branched), about 0.1 mm in diameter, and their walls turn olive in K. The conidia are hyaline and ellipsoidal, about 1–1.5 × 2 μm. No lichen secondary metabolites were detected.

== Habitat and distribution ==
The species is known from the Netherlands, where it has been observed in orchid nursery glasshouses on living leaves of orchids (including Dendrobium and Vanda, and reported more generally from several members of the Orchidaceae). In these glasshouses it occurs under warm conditions (about 10–25 °C) and can form a thin film across the leaves. Although many plants tolerate it, it can reduce the vitality of small or slow-growing orchids and also affects the appearance of plants intended for sale or display.

No effective preventative treatment was reported in the original account. Instead, growers removed the lichen by rubbing it off by hand, which makes it labour-intensive and economically damaging. Aptroot considered its geographic origin uncertain, but suggested it was more likely introduced on imported orchids from tropical regions than derived from a local temperate species; he also noted that many tropical leaf-dwelling Arthonia have different photobionts (often filamentous green algae) than the coccoid photobiont seen here. The species was presented as the first lichen reported to cause economic damage.

== See also ==
- List of Arthonia species
