= Arthonia ligniariella =

Scientific classification
- Kingdom: Fungi
- Division: Ascomycota
- Class: Arthoniomycetes
- Order: Arthoniales
- Family: Arthoniaceae
- Genus: Arthonia
- Species: A. ligniariella

Binomial name
- Arthonia ligniariella Coppins (1989)

Species of lichen-forming fungus

Arthonia ligniariella is a species of lichen-forming fungus in the family Arthoniaceae. The lichen forms minute black, round fruiting bodies typically about 0.1–0.2 mm in diameter, occurring in association with a thin film containing a mixture of algae. It produces small, colourless ascospores that are divided into two cells, with the upper cell usually shorter and broader than the lower. The species occurs primarily on decaying wood but has also been found on bark and dying mosses, and is known from scattered localities in Britain, northern Europe, North America, and the Arctic.

== Taxonomy ==
Arthonia ligniariella was described by Brian Coppins in 1989 from material collected in Knole Park, Sevenoaks (Kent), on decaying wood of a beech (Fagus) trunk. The species closely resembles Arthonia ligniaria in overall appearance and internal anatomy, but differs in having narrower asci and smaller ascospores. Coppins also reported that the holotype of A. ligniaria includes a small patch attributable to A. ligniariella, which helped clarify that two similar taxa were involved.

After its description in 1989, Arthonia ligniariella was for a long time afterwards reported only rarely in Europe. In the field it was initially regarded as an obligate lignicole, but the first North American material was collected in British Columbia on the bark of western red cedar (Thuja plicata), a substrate that often supports species otherwise associated with dead wood. The species can be separated from superficially similar members of the genus such as A. ligniaria by a non-amyloid hymenium and smaller ascospores.

Because it has small, black, lecidioid apothecia and single-septum (1-septate) spores of this size, A. ligniariella may be confused with species such as A. apatetica, A. exilis, A. lapidicola and A. leucodontis. Those species can be separated microscopically because they have amyloid reactions in the hymenium (at least after K treatment) and a minute amyloid ring at the ascus apex, which are absent in A. ligniariella. Coppins noted that the biological status of A. ligniariella (and the related A. ligniaria) is uncertain, as they occur with a mixed algal film and may be parasitic, weakly lichenised, or saprophytic on organic material in the film or substrate.

== Description ==
The thallus is inconspicuous, with the apothecia occurring in association with a thin, somewhat gelatinous film containing a mixture of algae. The apothecia are minute, black, round, and disc-like without a thalline margin (lecidioid), typically about 0.1–0.2 mm in diameter, and in cross section are about 65–85 μm tall. The tissues are non-amyloid (showing no reaction to iodine-based staining), and the uppermost layer (epithecium) and the tissue beneath the spore-bearing layer (hypothecium) are brown, becoming olivaceous in K. The spore-bearing layer (hymenium) is about 25–30 μm tall, and the thread-like filaments between the asci (paraphysoids) are densely branched and slightly narrower than in A. ligniaria (about 1.2–1.7 μm wide in the mid-hymenium).

The asci are (26–)30–45(–52) × 12–15 μm, with a clavate to roughly elliptic spore-bearing part and a narrow stalk that extends into the hypothecium. The ascospores are 10.5–14 × 3.3–3.8 μm, hyaline, 1-septate, narrowly clavate and constricted at the septum, with the upper cell usually shorter and broader than the lower. No distinct epispore was reported, and conidiomata (pycnidia) were not observed. In microscopic cross section, A. ligniariella has a hymenium that does not show an amyloid staining reaction, a feature that is uncommon in Arthonia. It also has relatively small ascospores compared with similar lignicolous species that may occur in the same habitats.

== Habitat and distribution ==
Arthonia ligniariella is mainly lignicolous, occurring on decaying wood, but it has also been recorded on bark and on dying mosses. The type collection was on decaying beech wood, and additional British material was reported from hardboard lying on a shingle beach, old and fallen pine (Pinus) trunks and stumps (including Pinus nigra var. maritima), the north side of an oak (Quercus) trunk, and decaying cushions of Leucobryum glaucum in a small bog. Coppins suggested that its association with a mixed algal film may reflect an unusual nutritional mode, with the fungus possibly living as a weakly lichenised species, a parasite, or a saprophyte within the film and substrate.

In Britain it has been reported from relatively few localities, with records from south-east England (Kent) and several sites in Scotland (including Wigtownshire, Fife, Angus, and Easter Ross). Coppins also cited material from Sweden (Härjedalen), associated with the A. ligniaria type collection, suggesting it may occur more widely in suitable habitats than the British records alone imply.

In North America, Arthonia ligniariella has been documented from British Columbia, where it was collected in an old-growth Thuja plicata forest in the Rocky Mountains near the Alberta border. The specimen was found on an underhang of cedar bark at about 1,224 m elevation, extending the species' known range from northern Europe to western North America. It has also been recorded from North Carolina in the eastern United States. It was recorded for the first time in the Arctic (in Svalbard) in 2010.

== See also ==
- List of Arthonia species
