= Arthonia prominens =

Scientific classification
- Domain: Eukaryota
- Kingdom: Fungi
- Division: Ascomycota
- Class: Arthoniomycetes
- Order: Arthoniales
- Family: Arthoniaceae
- Genus: Arthonia
- Species: A. prominens

Binomial name
- Arthonia prominens Follmann (2003)

Species of lichen

Arthonia prominens is a species of lichenicolous (lichen-dwelling) fungus in the family Arthoniaceae. Discovered on the Pacific coast of Chile, it was described as new to science in 2003 by Gerhard Follman. The holotype was collected in the supralittoral zone between Las Ventanas and Quintero, in the Valparaíso Province of Central Chile, at an elevation of about 10 metres. The fungus grows specifically on the thallus of Ingaderia gracillima, a fruticose lichen. The species epithet prominens (Latin for "projecting" or "prominent") refers to the swollen macules (spots) produced on the host's branches where the fungus's fruiting bodies aggregate.

Arthonia prominens is characterised by its distinctive infection pattern, forming ash-grey, drab-coloured, or whitish raised macules measuring 1.2–2.5 mm in diameter on the flattened branches of I. gracillima. The fungus causes significant alterations to the host's cortical and medullary structure, disintegrating the normal hyphal arrangement. It produces numerous ascomata (0.1–0.3 mm in diameter) and smaller conidiomata on these infection zones. The asci contain eight brownish, mostly three-celled ascospores. Unlike its relative A. ingaderiae, A. prominens is considered parasitic due to the extensive changes it causes in its host. The species is endemic to the Mediterranean coastland of Pacific South America, ranging from approximately 30° to 33° south latitude, and appears to be more adapted to moderate Mediterranean conditions compared to A. ingaderiae.
