= Arthonia thelotrematis =

Scientific classification
- Kingdom: Fungi
- Division: Ascomycota
- Class: Arthoniomycetes
- Order: Arthoniales
- Family: Arthoniaceae
- Genus: Arthonia
- Species: A. thelotrematis

Binomial name
- Arthonia thelotrematis Coppins (1989)

Species of lichen-dwelling fungus

Arthonia thelotrematis is a species of lichenicolous (lichen-dwelling) fungus in the family Arthoniaceae. It was described in 1989 from material collected in western Scotland. The fungus is a parasite of the lichen Thelotrema lepadinum, on whose surface it produces minute, dark fruiting bodies within discrete patches of dead host tissue. It is known from scattered localities in western Britain, the Azores, and France.

== Taxonomy ==
Arthonia thelotrematis was described by the lichenologist Brian J. Coppins in 1989, based on material collected in western Scotland. It is a lichenicolous fungus (a fungus that lives on lichens), and was introduced as a new species because it consistently occurs on the thallus of Thelotrema lepadinum and rapidly produces discrete areas of dead tissue on its host. The type collection came from Taynish in Kintyre (Scotland), where it was found on T. lepadinum growing on hazel (Corylus).

Coppins compared the species most closely with Arthonia graphidicola, another lichenicolous species described in the same paper. While the two are similar in their small, dark apothecia and warting of old spores, A. thelotrematis tends to have slightly shorter ascospores and has a distinctly reddish-brown hypothecium (the tissue below the spore-bearing layer), whereas that of A. graphidicola is hyaline. Ecologically they also differ: A. graphidicola appears to be largely harmless to its host, but A. thelotrematis is clearly parasitic, quickly inducing necrotic patches. Thelotrema lepadinum can also host other lichenicolous fungi, and Coppins recorded Opegrapha thelotrematis and Skyttea nitschkei from British material of the same host.

In a discussion of lichenicolous Arthonia species associated with members of Graphidaceae in a broad sense, James Lendemer and colleagues drew attention to A. thelotrematis as a comparative taxon. They noted that the modern circumscription of Graphidaceae would place the host (Thelotrema lepadinum) in the same family as Graphis hosts of related lichenicolous species, and reiterated the characters used to separate A. thelotrematis from similar taxa (including its pigmented hymenial tissues and slightly smaller ascospores).

== Description ==
The fungus grows on the thallus of Thelotrema lepadinum and typically forms circular to elliptic necrotic patches about 3–7 × 1.5–5 mm. Its fruiting bodies (apothecia) are usually crowded and become visible as the infection breaks through the host thallus surface: they are fleck-like, rounded to somewhat polygonal, and very small (about 0.06–0.2 mm across). Some apothecia are stretched into short lines up to about 0.4 × 0.06–0.12 mm, and a few are slightly branched or bluntly star-shaped. They are dark reddish-brown to black and lack a powdery coating.

Microscopically, the apothecia are about 55–60 micrometres (μm) tall in section. The uppermost layer (epithecium) is reddish-brown and stains olive-green with potassium hydroxide (K+), and the spore-bearing layer (hymenium) is a dilute reddish-brown with similar K+ reactions; both layers stain red with iodine (I+ red), and then blue after potassium hydroxide followed by iodine (K/I+ blue). The underlying hypothecium is also reddish-brown (K+ olive-green; I+ blue). The asci are club-shaped (clavate), measuring about 30–35 × 13–14 μm, and usually show a minute starch-reactive (amyloid) ring in K/I; each ascus contains eight ascospores. The ascospores are 11–14 × 4.5–5 μm, typically divided by three cross-walls (3-septate, occasionally 2-septate), and "macrocephalic" (meaning the upper cell is slightly enlarged). They are initially colourless (hyaline) and smooth, often with a thin outer layer, but with age they become brown and develop granular warting. Pycnidia (asexual fruiting structures) have not been observed.

== Habitat and distribution ==
Arthonia thelotrematis is restricted to the thallus of Thelotrema lepadinum, where it behaves as a parasite and is usually expressed as discrete necrotic patches dotted with minute apothecia. A review of lichen biodiversity in Britain's Atlantic broad-leaved woodlands listed A. thelotrematis among lichenicolous fungi for which Atlantic woodlands are the main habitat, even though its host may occur outside the Atlantic zone. In the known British material, the host was recorded from bark on hazel (Corylus) and rowan (Sorbus), indicating that the fungus may occur wherever well-developed thalli of T. lepadinum persist on suitable trees in humid western woodlands.

At the time of its original publication, the species was known from only two collections in the British Isles as reported by Coppins: the type from Kintyre (Taynish, Scotland) and a second specimen from Colonsay in the Inner Hebrides, where it was found on T. lepadinum growing on Sorbus. Given its small size and dependence on a single host, Coppins suggested it was likely to be under-recorded, and may be overlooked unless infected thalli of T. lepadinum are examined closely. It was later reported from the Azores and from France.

== See also ==
- List of Arthonia species
