= Arthonia thoriana =

Scientific classification
- Domain: Eukaryota
- Kingdom: Fungi
- Division: Ascomycota
- Class: Arthoniomycetes
- Order: Arthoniales
- Family: Arthoniaceae
- Genus: Arthonia
- Species: A. thoriana

Binomial name
- Arthonia thoriana Ertz & Sanderson (2018)

Species of lichen

Arthonia thoriana is a species of bark-dwelling fungus in the family Arthoniaceae. It is found in the grazed pasture woodlands of Somerset, Great Britain.

== Taxonomy ==
Arthonia thoriana was described as a new species by the lichenologists Damien Ertz and Nicholas Sanderson in 2018. The type specimen was collected in Great Britain, specifically in Horner Combe, Somerset, from the bark of ancient oak trees. The species epithet honours the Swedish lichenologist Göran Thor, "for his outstanding work on the taxonomy of the Arthoniaceae".

== Description ==
The thallus of Arthonia thoriana is white, up to 3 cm in diameter, and up to 60 μm thick. It is non-lichenised despite the presence of large colonies of free-living single-celled green algae. The ascomata (fruiting bodies) are sessile, black, and punctiform, with a diameter of 0.12–0.30 mm. The hymenium is hyaline to very pale brown, 35–45 μm thick, with a brown epihymenium covered by crystals of calcium oxalate. The ascospores are hyaline, fusiform, and measure 9–12 by 3.0–3.5 μm. They are (1–2–)3-septate and lack a gelatinous sheath.

== Habitat and distribution ==
Arthonia thoriana is found on the dry bark of ancient Quercus petraea in grazed pasture woodlands in Horner Combe, Somerset, at elevations of 110–180 metres. The species was observed to be most vigorous on well-lit trees and is associated with other lichen species such Chaenotheca trichialis, Chrysothrix candelaris, Inoderma subabietinum, and Dendrographa decolorans.

== Similar species ==
Arthonia thoriana is similar to Arthonia pruinosella and Arthonia punctiformis, but it can be distinguished by its smaller, white-pruinose ascomata and smaller ascospores. A. pruinosella has circular to lirellate ascomata with a black disc and larger ascospores, while A. punctiformis has much larger and non-pruinose ascomata and larger ascospores.

== See also ==
- List of Arthonia species
