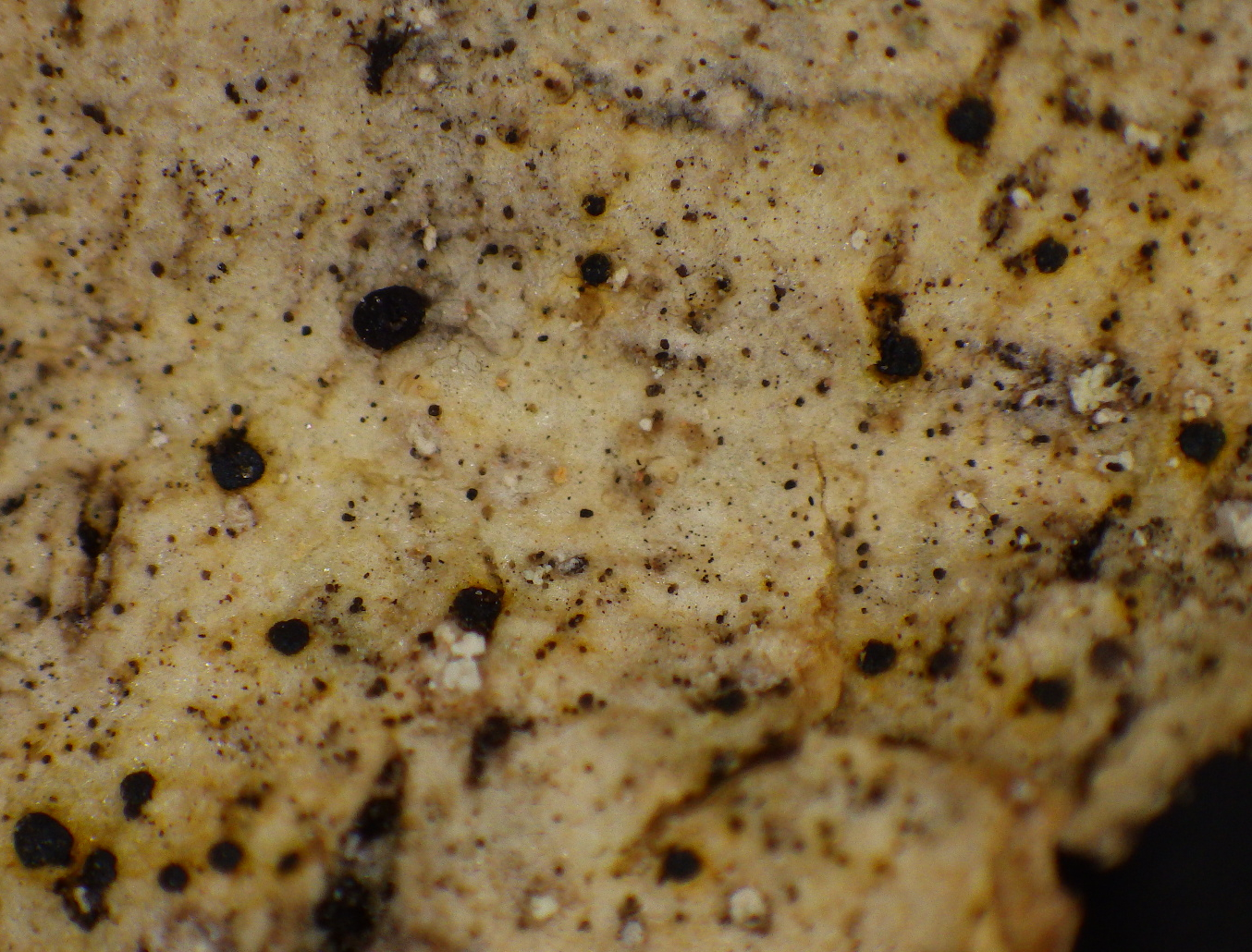

Scientific classification
- Kingdom: Fungi
- Division: Ascomycota
- Class: Arthoniomycetes
- Order: Arthoniales
- Family: Arthoniaceae
- Genus: Arthonia
- Species: A. vinosa

Binomial name
- Arthonia vinosa Leight. (1856)

= Arthonia vinosa =

Species of lichen

Arthonia vinosa is a species of lichen belonging to the family Arthoniaceae.

It has a cosmopolitan distribution.

== See also ==
- List of Arthonia species
