= Arthonia ilicinella =

Scientific classification
- Domain: Eukaryota
- Kingdom: Fungi
- Division: Ascomycota
- Class: Arthoniomycetes
- Order: Arthoniales
- Family: Arthoniaceae
- Genus: Arthonia
- Species: A. ilicinella

Binomial name
- Arthonia ilicinella Nyl. (1867)

Species of lichen

Arthonia ilicinella is a species of crustose lichen belonging to the family Arthoniaceae. First described in 1867, it is characterised by its immersed thallus that appears white-grey to cream-white, and its small black reproductive structures. The species has a widespread global distribution, occurring across Europe (including the United Kingdom, Ireland, Germany, Portugal, Spain, and Switzerland), South America (Argentina and Chile), and parts of Asia (South Korea). In the British Isles, it serves as an ecological indicator species used in environmental assessments, and has been noted in Scotland as an old-growth forest indicator that has significantly declined over recent decades.

== Taxonomy ==
Arthonia ilicinella was described as a new species in 1867 by the Finnish lichenologist William Nylander. In his original description, Nylander noted its similarity to A. ilicina, but distinguished it as typically smaller with smaller spores . He also observed that when treated with iodine, the hymenial gelatin turned wine-red without any visible blue colouration. Nylander documented its habitat on holly bark in Killarney, Ireland, where it was collected by Isaac Carroll. He further characterised the species as having spores with 3–6 septa, usually well-developed with the larger ones being 5-septate. He compared it to A. cinnabarina, noting differences, and mentioned that in A. ilicina, the hymenial gelatin turns persistently blue with iodine. Another distinguishing feature he recorded was that the epithecium turns a dirty blue colour when treated with potassium hydroxide solution.

== Description ==
Arthonia ilicinella is a crustose lichen with a thallus (the main body of the lichen) is immersed within its substrate rather than sitting prominently on the surface. The thallus appears either as a diffuse growth or with defined boundaries marked by a brown line, and is coloured white-grey to cream-white. The reproductive structures (apothecia) measure between 0.1–0.6 mm in diameter, though some may be elongated, reaching about 0.8 mm long by 0.15–0.3 mm wide. These structures are irregularly rounded, relatively flat, and black in colour without any powdery coating (pruina). The apothecia are 80–95 micrometres (μm) tall.

Internally, the lichen has a layered structure: the epithecium (upper layer) is red-brown and turns pale green when exposed to potassium hydroxide solution (K); the hymenium (fertile layer where spores are produced) measures 40–60 μm in height, is pale red-brown, and also turns pale green with K; the hypothecium (layer beneath the hymenium) is 10–25 μm tall and matches the colour of the hymenium. The paraphysoids (sterile filaments between spore-producing cells) are about 1 μm in diameter, with brown-walled and slightly thicker (1.5–2 μm) structures in the epithecium, occasionally showing caps at their tips.

The ascospores (reproductive spores) typically measure 18–23 by 7–9 μm and have a cylindrical to egg-shaped form with 3 or 4 (occasionally 5) cross-walls or septa, with enlarged cells at the tips. Older spores turn brown and have a surface that is smooth or very slightly textured when viewed at high magnification (1000×).

Small asexual reproductive structures (pycnidia are often present but usually few in number, measuring 60–80 μm in diameter. The wall of these structures is red-brown and turns pale green with K. The conidia (asexual spores) produced measure 7–9 by roughly 1 μm. Chemical analysis (thin-layer chromatography) did not detect any secondary metabolites (lichen products) in this species.

== Habitat and distribution ==
Arthonia ilicinella has a wide global distribution, occurring across multiple continents. In Europe, it is found in Germany, Ireland, Portugal (including the Azores in the Atlantic Ocean), Spain, Switzerland, and the United Kingdom. The species also appears in South America, specifically in Argentina and Chile, and extends to Asia where it has been documented in South Korea. In the British Isles, Arthonia ilicinella serves as an ecological indicator species, commonly used by researchers and conservationists when conducting environmental assessments. In Scotland, it has been noted as one of the benchmark "old-growth" indicator species that had undergone the most significant decline over a five-decade period. In 2016, it was reported from South Korea.

== See also ==
- List of Arthonia species
