= Arthonia isidiata =

Scientific classification
- Kingdom: Fungi
- Division: Ascomycota
- Class: Arthoniomycetes
- Order: Arthoniales
- Family: Arthoniaceae
- Genus: Arthonia
- Species: A. isidiata

Binomial name
- Arthonia isidiata Grube, Lücking & L.Umaña (2004)

Species of lichen

Arthonia isidiata is a species of corticolous (bark-dwelling) crustose lichen in the family Arthoniaceae. Found in Central America, it is characterized by its thin, shiny thallus, and isidia (reproductive propagules) that emerge from the surface. Discovered in Costa Rica's Corcovado National Park, and later recorded from Panama, this species thrives in lowland tropical coastal rainforests on smooth bark of smaller, often young trees.

== Taxonomy ==
Arthonia isidiata was first formally described by lichenologists Martin Grube, Robert Lücking, and Loengrin Umaña-Tenorio as a new species of lichen in 2004. The type specimen was collected in 2003, in Corcovado National Park, Costa Rica. The lichen is named for the presence of isidia, which is a rare occurrence in the family Graphidaceae; Arthothelium isidiatum is the only other member of the family to have this reproductive propagule.

Arthonia isidiata does not belong to the genus Arthonia in the strict sense but seems to be related to a group of chiefly foliicolous taxa that are assigned to Arthonia sensu lato and Eremothecella. The authors suggest that molecular phylogenetic studies are needed to clarify natural relationships in this complex group of mostly tropical taxa.

== Description ==
Arthonia isidiata has a pale greenish to green, continuous, smooth, and shiny thallus, with isidia emerging from the surface. Isidia are cylindrical to knotted, simple to coralloid, and can grow up to 0.4 mm tall and 20–30 μm in diameter. The lichen's ascomata are black and irregularly rounded, with a diameter of up to 2.5 mm.

One unique feature of this species is its thin and shiny thallus, which contrasts with many other corticolous Arthonia species. Moreover, the isidia of Arthonia isidiata closely resemble the isidiate protuberances of certain Porina species, which are common in the same habitat.

== Habitat and distribution ==
Arthonia isidiata occurs in lowland tropical coastal rainforests, specifically in Parque Nacional Corcovado in Costa Rica. It grows frequently on trees with smooth bark in the area, but has not been found in the apparently drier forests south of the field station. The forest where the type locality of Arthonia isidiata thrives consists of a mixture of sandy and alluvial soils, with a sparse understory and light conditions ranging from moderately exposed to rather shaded. In 2017, it was reported to occur in Panama.

== See also ==
- List of Arthonia species
