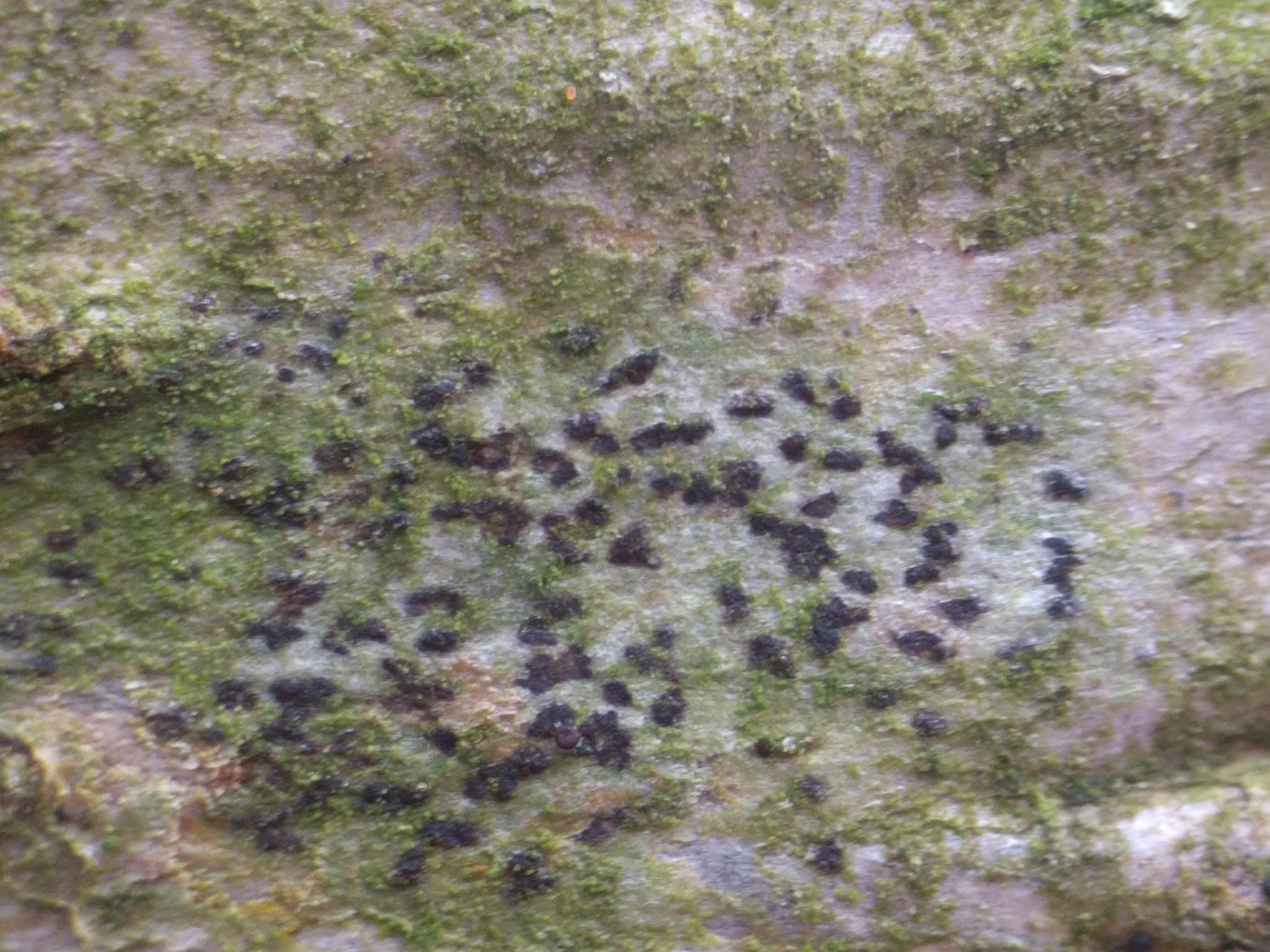

Scientific classification
- Domain: Eukaryota
- Kingdom: Fungi
- Division: Ascomycota
- Class: Arthoniomycetes
- Order: Arthoniales
- Family: Arthoniaceae
- Genus: Arthonia
- Species: A. didyma

Binomial name
- Arthonia didyma Körb. (1853)

= Arthonia didyma =

Species of lichen

Arthonia didyma is a species of lichen belonging to the family Arthoniaceae. It is native to Eurasia and North America.

== See also ==
- List of Arthonia species
