= Arthonia ingaderiae =

Scientific classification
- Domain: Eukaryota
- Kingdom: Fungi
- Division: Ascomycota
- Class: Arthoniomycetes
- Order: Arthoniales
- Family: Arthoniaceae
- Genus: Arthonia
- Species: A. ingaderiae

Binomial name
- Arthonia ingaderiae Follmann (2003)

Species of lichen

Arthonia ingaderiae is a species of lichenicolous (lichen-dwelling) fungus in the family Arthoniaceae. Discovered on the Pacific coast of South America, it was described as new to science in 2003 by Gerhard Follman. The holotype was collected from the Lomas of Paposo, north of Taltal, Chile, at an elevation of about 400 m (1,300 ft) in the lower fog belt. The fungus grows specifically on the thalli of two fruticose lichen species: Ingaderia gracillima and Ingaderia pulcherrima. The species epithet ingaderiae refers to the host genus Ingaderia.

Arthonia ingaderiae is characterised by its blackish, irregularly roundish ascomata (fruiting bodies) measuring 0.3–0.6 mm in diameter, which grow on the branches of its host lichens. The fungus produces roughly spherical asci containing eight brown, mostly three-celled ascospores with a distinctive macrocephalic shape and spiny surface. Notably, A. ingaderiae shows a parasymbiotic relationship with its hosts, causing no visible damage to the lichen thalli. The species is endemic to the temperate to subtropical coastland of Pacific South America, ranging from approximately 23° to 34° south latitude. It inhabits various substrates including bark, spines, and other lichens in foggy, moderately halophytic environments typical of the Central to North Chilean Ingaderietum gracillimae community. Arthonia ingaderiae represents the first lichen-inhabiting fungus reported from the genus Ingaderia and may belong to a distinct subgroup within the genus Arthonia.
