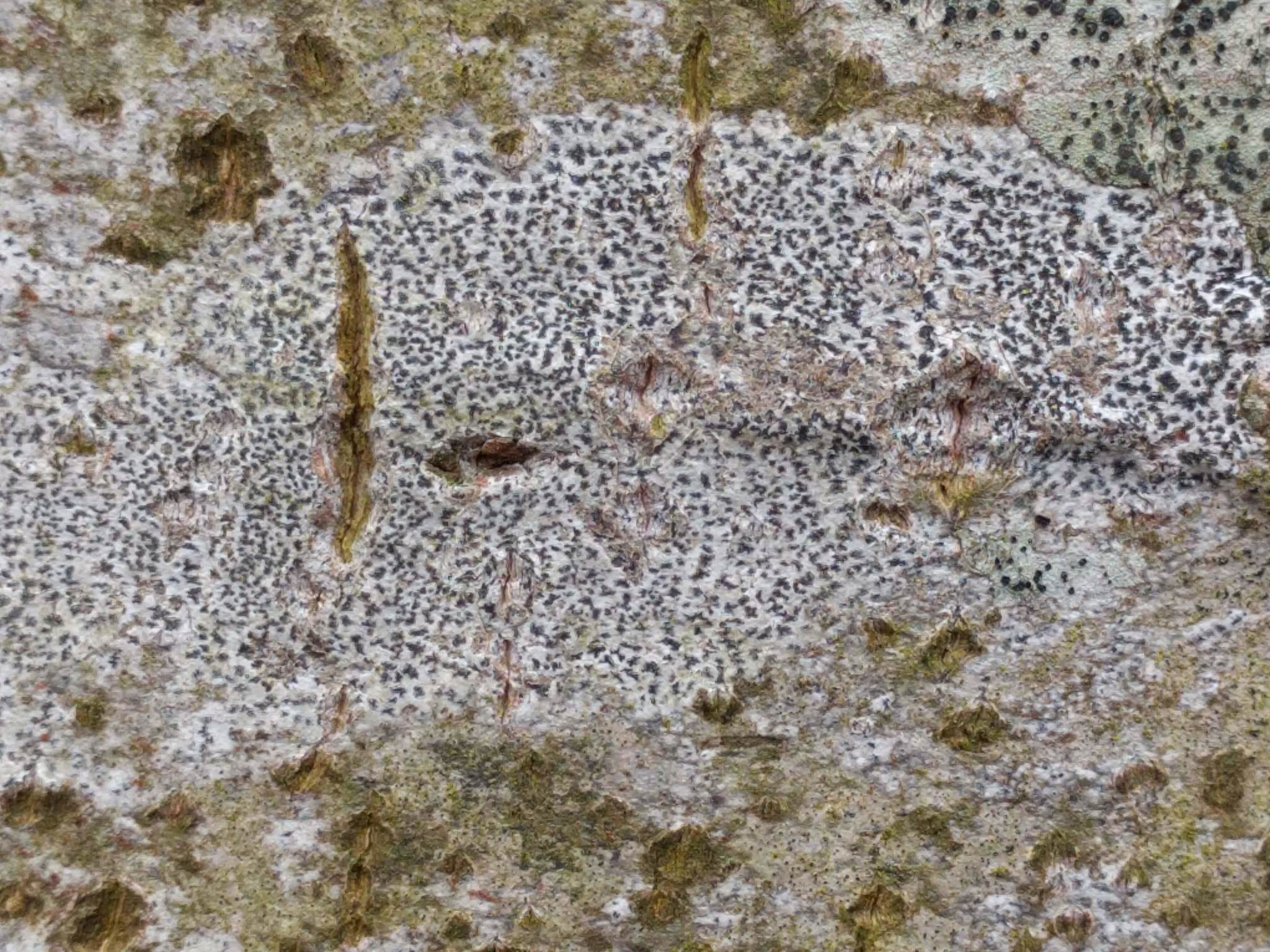

Conservation status
- Secure (NatureServe)

Scientific classification
- Kingdom: Fungi
- Division: Ascomycota
- Class: Arthoniomycetes
- Order: Arthoniales
- Family: Arthoniaceae
- Genus: Arthonia
- Species: A. radiata

Binomial name
- Arthonia radiata (Pers.) Ach. (1808)

Synonyms
- List: Opegrapha radiata Pers. (1794); Lichen astroites Ach. (1799); Opegrapha astroidea var. radiata (Pers.) Ach. (1803); Arthonia astroidea ? radiata (Pers.) Ach. (1806); Arthonia astroidea f. radiata (Pers.) Ach. (1814); Arthonia vulgaris var. radiata (Pers.) Schaer. (1823); Opegrapha atra var. radiata (Pers.) Schaer. (1836); Arthonia vulgaris f. radiata (Pers.) Stein (1879); Arthonia astroidea var. radiata (Pers.) H.Olivier (1917); Opegrapha gregaria var. radiata (Pers.) M.Choisy (1950); Opegrapha astroidea Ach. (1803); Arthonia astroidea (Ach.) Ach. (1806); Arthonia radiata var. astroidea (Ach.) Ach. (1808); Arthonia radiata f. astroidea (Ach.) Ach. (1810); Arthonia vulgaris var. astroidea (Ach.) Schaer. (1823); Opegrapha radiata var. astroidea (Ach.) Fingerh. (1829); Graphis atra var. astroidea (Ach.) Spreng. (1832); Opegrapha atra var. astroidea (Ach.) Schaer. (1836); Arthonia vulgaris f. astroidea (Ach.) Boberski (1886); Arthonia swartziana Ach. (1806); Lichen swartzianus (Ach.) DC. (1813); Arthonia vulgaris var. swartziana (Ach.) Schaer. (1823); Opegrapha swartziana (Ach.) Hepp (1824); Opegrapha atra var. swartziana (Ach.) Schaer. (1836); Opegrapha vulgata var. swartziana (Ach.) Grognot (1863); Arthonia vulgaris f. swartziana (Ach.) Stein (1879); Arthonia radiata var. swartziana (Ach.) Almq. (1880); Arthonia astroidea subsp. swartziana (Ach.) Arnold (1884); Arthonia radiata subsp. swartziana (Ach.) Fink (1910); Arthonia astroidea var. swartziana (Ach.) Sacc. (1910); Opegrapha radiata var. swartziana (Ach.) M.Choisy (1950); Arthonia astroidea ß tynnocarpa Ach. (1806); Arthonia radiata var. opegraphina Ach. (1808); Arthonia astroidea var. opegraphina (Ach.) Ach. (1814); Arthonia opegraphina (Ach.) Leight. (1872); Arthonia cinnabarina var. opegraphina (Ach.) Leight. (1879); Arthonia astroidea f. opegraphina (Ach.) H.Olivier (1884); Arthonia gregaria var. opegraphina (Ach.) Müll.Arg. (1889); Arthonia astroidea var. epipastoides Nyl. ex Leight. (1871); Arthonia astroidea subsp. epipastoides (Nyl. ex Leight.) Nyl. (1873); Arthonia epipastoides (Nyl. ex Leight.) Arnold (1873); Arthonia cinnabarina var. epipastoides (Nyl. ex Leight.) Leight. (1879); Arthonia radiata var. epipastoides (Nyl. ex Leight.) A.L.Sm. (1911); Arthonia astroidea var. simulans Leight. (1879); Arthonia astroidea f. parallela Harm. (1900); Arthonia astroidea var. parallela (Harm.) B.de Lesd. (1908); Arthonia radiata f. parallela (Harm.) Zahlbr. (1922); Arthonia radiata var. parallela (Harm.) Zahlbr. (1922)

= Arthonia radiata =

Species of lichen

Arthonia radiata, the asterisk lichen, is a common and widepspread species of corticolous (bark-dwelling), crustose lichen in the family Arthoniaceae.

== Taxonomy ==
Arthonia radiata is the type species of the genus Arthonia. It was first formally described by Christiaan Hendrik Persoon in 1794, who called it Opegrapha radiata. Erik Acharius transferred it to the genus Arthonia in 1808. It has been known by many names in its lengthy taxonomic history.

The genome of Arthonia radiata has been sequenced and assembled. The draft genome is approximately 33.5 megabases in size, contains 6,931 annotated genes, and consists of 16.65% repeat sequences, predominantly LTR elements.

== Description ==
Arthonia radiata is a crustose lichen with an immersed thallus, often separated from its surroundings by a thin brown line. The thallus is typically pale, ranging from white to pale grey, sometimes with a brown or olive tinge, and often forms a mosaic-like pattern on its substrate. Its reproductive structures, called apothecia, are black and can appear in various shapes—rounded, star-like (stellate), or elongated. These apothecia can measure between 0.15 and 2.2 mm across, and are usually flat or slightly convex. They lack a frosted appearance, often referred to as being non-pruinose.

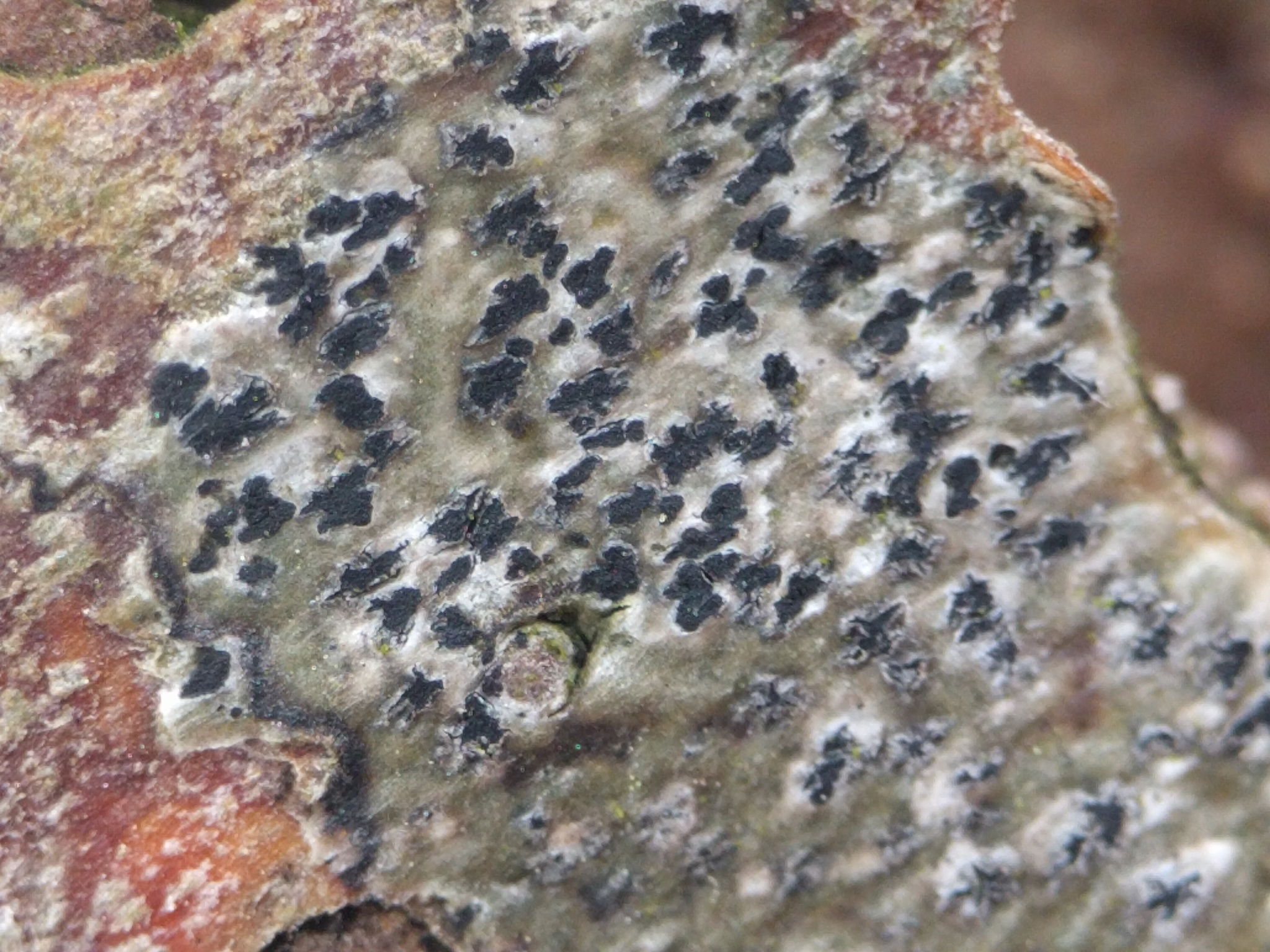
Closeup of thallus

Under a microscope, the apothecia have a thin epithecium (the upper layer) that is brown or olive-brown, reacting to certain chemical tests by turning pale green. The internal structure includes a clear hymenium (spore-producing layer) and a hypothecium (the layer beneath) that is also colourless to pale olive-brown. The paraphysoids (sterile filaments within the hymenium) are narrow, 1–2 μm wide, but can expand to 3 μm, and they are often capped with darker brown tips.

Arthonia radiata produces spores that are cylindric-obovoid to cylindrical, with 3 internal walls (septa) dividing the spore into 4 cells. These ascospores measure between 15 and 20 μm long and 4.5 to 6 μm wide, and the uppermost cell is not enlarged. While its asexual reproductive structures, pycnidia, are rare, they are immersed in the thallus and black, with a pale green reaction in chemical tests. These structures release small, rod-like conidia (asexual spores), about 4–5 μm long.

No secondary metabolites, often used to identify lichen species, have been detected in Arthonia radiata using thin-layer chromatography.

== Habitat and distribution ==
Arthonia radiata is a widespread and common species. It grows on the smooth bark of many trees and shrubs.

== Species interactions ==
Lichenicolous fungi that have been recorded growing on Arthonia radiata include Muellerella polyspora, Stigmidium arthoniae, and an undescribed species of Opegrapha.

== See also ==
- List of Arthonia species
