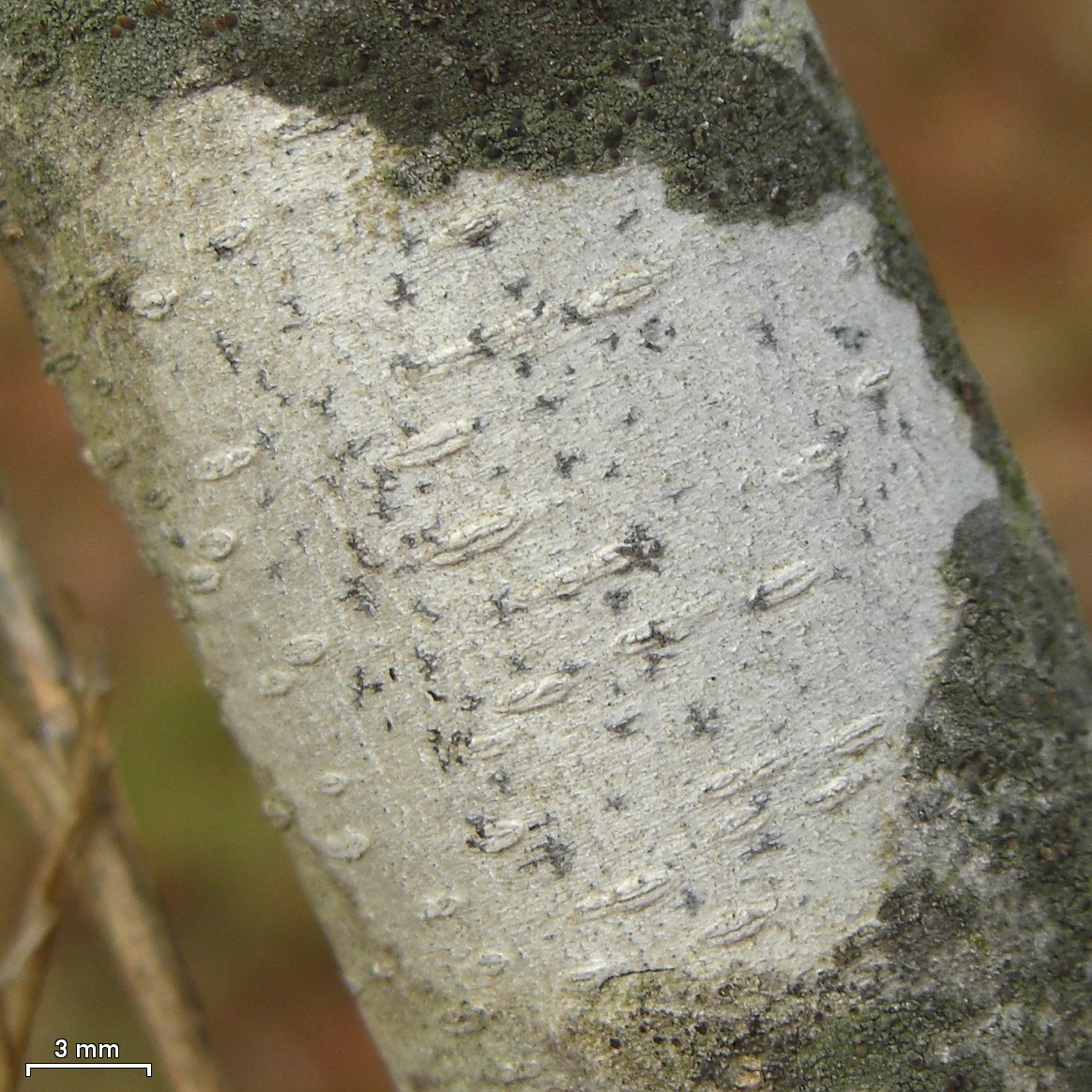
- Arthonia quintaria

Scientific classification
- Kingdom: Fungi
- Division: Ascomycota
- Class: Arthoniomycetes
- Order: Arthoniales
- Family: Arthoniaceae
- Genus: Arthonia; Ach. (1806)

Type species
- Arthonia radiata (Pers.) Ach. (1808)

Species
- about 300

Synonyms
- List: Conioloma Flörke (1815); Trachylia Fr. (1817); Naevia Fr. (1824); Celidium Tul. (1852); Celidiopsis A.Massal. (1856); Conida A.Massal. (1856); Spilodium A.Massal. (1856); Phacothecium Trevis. (1857); Craterolechia A.Massal. (1860); Glyphidium A.Massal. (1860); Caldesia Trevis. (1869); Arthonia subgen. Allarthonia Nyl. (1878); Arthonia sect. Lecideopsis Almq. (1880); Mycoporum subgen. Dermatina Almq. (1880); Dermatina (Almq.) Arnold (1881); Asterotrema Müll.Arg. (1884); Arthoniopsis Müll.Arg. (1890); Coccopeziza Har. & P.Karst. (1890); Lecideopsis (Almq.) Rehm (1891); Allarthonia (Nyl.) Müll.Arg. (1895); Mycarthonia Reinke (1895); Arthonia subgen. Allarthothelium Vain. (1896); Pseudoarthonia Marchand (1896); Conidella Elenkin (1901); Allarthonia (Nyl.) Zahlbr. (1903); Allarthothelium (Vain.) Zahlbr. (1908); Merarthonis Clem. (1909); Manilaea Syd. & P.Syd. (1914); Charcotia Hue (1915); Phlegmophiale Zahlbr. (1926); Allarthoniomyces E.A.Thomas (1939); Mycasterotrema Räsänen (1943); Xerodiscus Petr. (1943); Tomaselliella Cif. (1952); Allarthotheliomyces Cif. & Tomas. (1953); Aulaxinomyces Cif. & Tomas. (1953); Arthoniomyces E.A.Thomas ex Cif. & Tomas. (1953); Tomaselliellomyces Cif. (1953); Ameropeltomyces Bat. & H.Maia (1967)

= Arthonia =

Genus of lichens

Arthonia is a genus of crustose lichens in the family Arthoniaceae. They are commonly called comma lichens.

== Taxonomy ==
The genus was circumscribed by the Swedish lichenologist Erik Acharius in 1806. He set it apart chiefly by the form of its fruiting bodies. He described the apothecia as variable in outline (roundish, oblong, or irregular) sitting on the surface or partly sunk into it, flat to slightly convex and only rarely deeply depressed, and crucially without a true margin. He stressed that these structures are composed of their own tissue rather than of the thallus, forming the entire fertile layer or being merely roofed by it. The thallus, as Acharius framed it, could be uniformly crustose and diffuse, sometimes poorly delimited and thin, powdery and partly embedded in the substrate, or, in other cases, foliose and leathery.

Acharius placed Arthonia among the "idiothalamous" lichens and positioned it immediately before Opegrapha. In doing so he drew sharp contrasts with neighbouring genera. He considered whether the so-called apothecia of Spiloma were genuine and, pending fuller study, warned that species merely resembling Spiloma but bearing true apothecia did not belong there and should be retained in Arthonia. By contrast, Opegrapha was said to have distinctly elongated apothecia with a very narrow, almost linear disc and its own margins; these were features that, to Acharius, marked a clear boundary with the marginless, variably shaped apothecia of Arthonia. He also noted differences from Lecidea and Peltidea, arguing that while some species might converge in superficial habit, their apothecial structure separated them from Arthonia.

The nineteenth-century generic name Coniangium was judged to endanger the long-established use of Arthonia. When sanctioning under Art. 13.1(d) of the Berlin Code was extended to lichen-forming fungi, the sanctioned Coniangium (as used by Fries) could have priority over the unsanctioned Arthonia. Fries's type, Coniangium vulgare, is a superfluous name because he cited Arthonia lurida, Lichen dryinus, and Spiloma paradoxum as synonyms; under sanctioning, the sanctioned Spiloma paradoxum ought to have been adopted, which would tether Coniangium to the Arthonia spadicea complex and displace Arthonia. To prevent that outcome, Hawksworth and David proposed adding Coniangium to the names rejected in favour of Arthonia, thereby securing current usage of Arthonia for a large, cosmopolitan genus. Subsequent consideration by the Nomenclature Committee for Fungi did not support the proposal to add Coniangium to the names rejected in favour of Arthonia (vote 5–9–0; not recommended), on the grounds that Coniangium was not 'sanctioned' and therefore posed no threat to the conserved usage of Arthonia.

== Description ==
Arthonia species are typically crustose lichens, forming thin, often inconspicuous patches that can be either flush with the surface (immersed) or sitting on top (superficial). The thallus—the main body of the lichen—may spread without clear boundaries or sometimes be neatly outlined by thin brown lines. In some species, the thallus may be absent altogether. Under chemical tests, the fungal filaments (hyphae) in the thallus can show distinctive reactions, turning red or pale blue when stained with iodine (I+) and then blue with a potassium iodine (K/I) solution.

The photosynthetic partner (photobiont) is most commonly a green alga belonging to the genus Trentepohlia. In some cases, however, a less well-known type of green alga is involved, and a few species are only weakly lichenised or even live partly by breaking down dead organic matter (saprophytic) or parasitising other lichens (lichenicolous).

The reproductive structures of Arthonia are ascomata, which are often similar to apothecia (open, disc-like fruiting bodies) but can have a wide range of shapes. They may be round, elongated, linear, or even star-shaped, and on bark they often develop a subtle, thin rim of tissue that includes both lichen and host bark cells. The exposed surface of these structures (the disc) can be reddish-brown to black, and sometimes appears dusted with pale or white powder (pruina). Unlike many lichens, Arthonia usually lacks a thalline exciple (a protective rim made of thallus tissue) and often also lacks a true exciple (a layer of fungal tissue), though a few species develop a well-defined, carbonised boundary.

Internally, the top layer (epithecium) can range from colourless to reddish or dark brown. The main spore-producing region (hymenium) typically reacts to the same chemical tests as the thallus hyphae, and these reactions help distinguish Arthonia from other lichens. Beneath the hymenium, a distinct hypothecium (a supporting layer) may be absent or difficult to separate from the hymenium. Thread-like fungal elements (paraphysoids) weave through a gel-like matrix, becoming more intricately branched and pigmented near their tips, where they often form small, dark "caps".

The asci, or spore-bearing cells, usually contain eight spores and have a characteristic Arthonia-type structure. They are often semi-fissitunicate (splitting in a controlled way when releasing spores) and possess a large, domed apex with a specialised "ocular chamber" that may show subtle colour changes with chemical tests. The ascospores themselves are typically oval or elongated, divided into one to seven segments (septa), and start off colourless and smooth. As they mature and age, they may darken and become slightly roughened. Initially, the spores can have a very thin, colourless outer layer (epispore).

In addition to sexual reproduction via ascospores, Arthonia often produces tiny, inconspicuous, flask-shaped structures called pycnidia. These generate small, colourless, single-celled spores (conidia) that are usually rod-shaped but occasionally ellipsoidal or thread-like.

From a chemical standpoint, many Arthonia species do not contain distinct lichen products, but others produce a variety of substances, including xanthones and certain anthraquinones. These chemical differences, along with the various structural features, help distinguish different species within the genus.

== Gallery ==
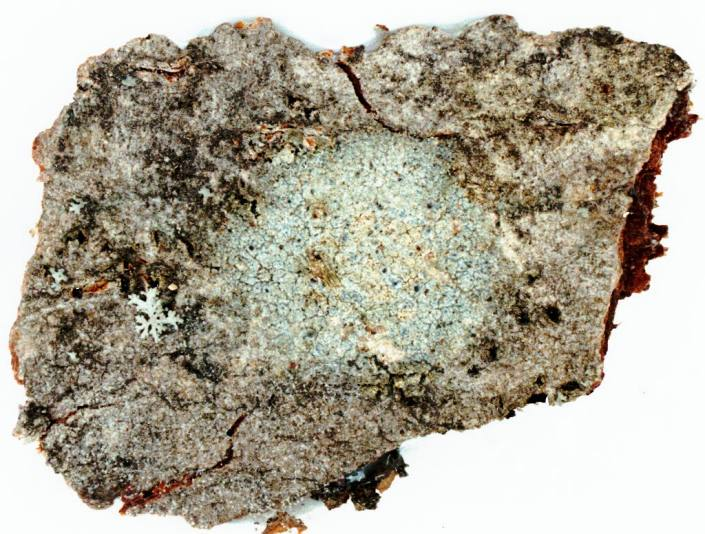
Arthonia caesia

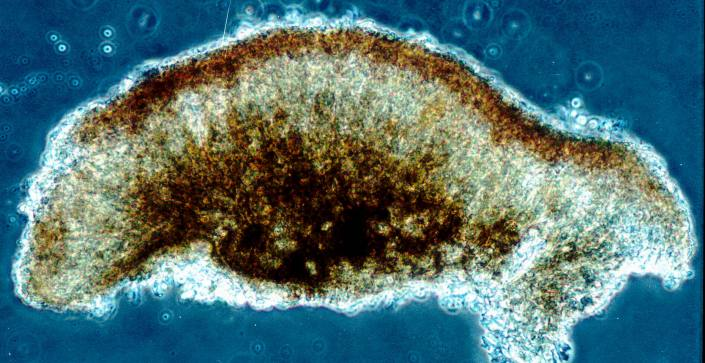
Photograph of a cross section of an apothecium of A. caesia taken through a compound microscope, x 400.

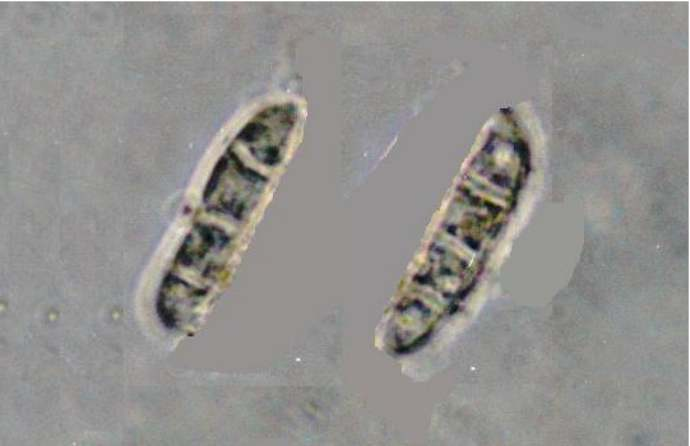
Photograph of two spores (3-septate, 4-celled) from Arthonia caesia taken through a compound microscope, x 1000. (spores measure 21 x 5 micrometres)

== Selected species ==
- Arthonia didyma
- Arthonia ilicinella
- Arthonia isidiata
- Arthonia stereocaulina
- Arthonia vinosa
