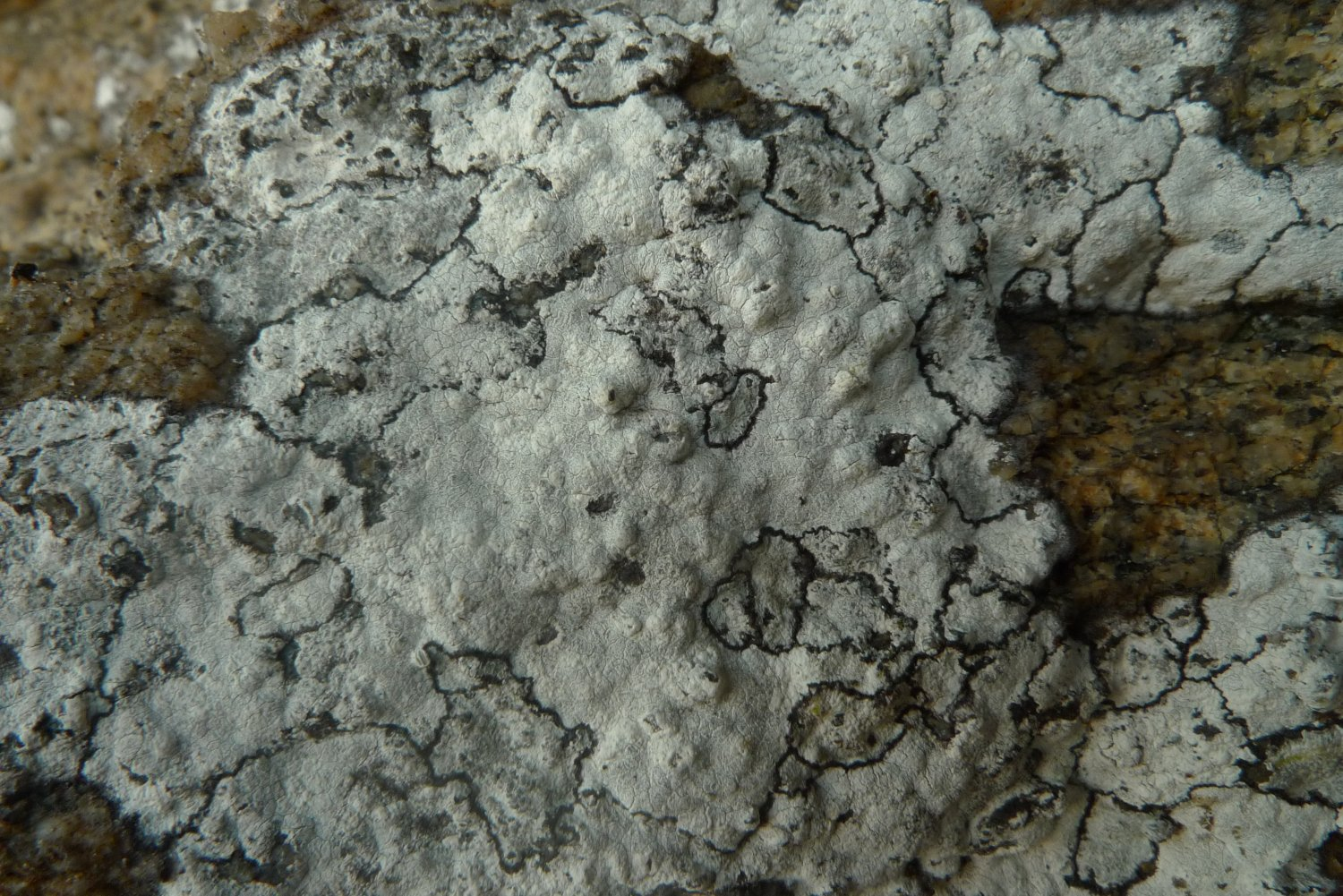
- Roccellographa circumscripta

Scientific classification
- Domain: Eukaryota
- Kingdom: Fungi
- Division: Ascomycota
- Class: Arthoniomycetes
- Order: Arthoniales
- Family: Roccellographaceae
- Genus: Roccellographa; J.Steiner (1902)

Type species
- Roccellographa cretacea J.Steiner (1902)

Species
- R. circumscripta R. cretacea R. muriformis R. sorediata

Synonyms
- Stigmatella Mudd (1861); Roccellographomyces Cif. & Tomas. (1953); Sclerophytonomyces Cif. & Tomas. (1953); Sclerophytonomyces Cif. & Tomas. ex Sparrius (2004); Peterjamesia D.Hawksw. (2006)

= Roccellographa =

Genus of lichen

Roccellographa is a genus of lichen-forming fungi in the family Roccellographaceae. These lichens form thin, tightly adhering crusts on rocks that reveal a bright orange colour when scraped, due to their algal partner. The genus was established in 1902 by the Austrian lichenologist Julius Steiner and comprises four species that produce distinctive elongated, slit-like fruiting bodies.

== Taxonomy ==
The genus was circumscribed by the Austrian lichenologist Julius Steiner in 1902, with Roccellographa cretacea assigned as the type, and at that time, the only species. Steiner established Roccellographa to accommodate lichens that resembled members of the crustose lichen family Roccellaceae but differed significantly in their reproductive structures. He noted that whilst the new genus belonged to the family Graphidaceae based on its distinctive elongated, slit-like apothecia (lirellae), it formed a connecting link between the Roccellaceae and Graphidaceae families. The type species, R. cretacea, was characterised by its chalky white, lobate-fruticose thallus that formed dense, granular patches, and its distinctive apothecia (fruiting bodies) that appeared either colourless or sparsely branched, with the disc barely exceeding the level of the surrounding thallus tissue. Three additional species have since been transferred to the genus from other genera.

== Description ==
Roccellographa lichens form a thin, even crust that adheres tightly to the rock. The surrounding prothallus—an outer weft of purely fungal strands—often develops into a dark, mosaic-like network that delineates neighbouring colonies. If the surface is gently scraped it reveals a bright orange tint, a sign of the underlying algal partner (Trentepohlia) whose carotenoid pigments colour the exposed cells. Chemical spot tests detect psoromic and conpsoromic acids, secondary metabolites that help distinguish the genus from superficially similar rock-dwelling lichen crusts.

Sexual fruit bodies are minute, blackish dots immersed in the thallus and frequently aligned in short rows or clusters. They lack a thalline margin, so the rim is formed solely by the true exciple, which is dark brown above and pales towards the base. Inside, the spore-bearing layer (hymenium) contains stout, interwoven paraphysoids, while the supporting hypothecium remains colourless. Each ascus releases eight ascospores and belongs to the Opegrapha-type fissitunicate pattern, meaning its wall splits in two during discharge. The spores are elongated—either spindle-shaped or narrowly club-like—with up to seven internal cross-walls (septa). As they mature they acquire a grey-brown shade and develop slightly swollen ends (a form described as macrocephalic). Asexual propagules (conidia) have not been observed in the genus.

== Species ==
- Roccellographa circumscripta (Leight.) Ertz & Tehler (2011)
- Roccellographa cretacea J.Steiner (1902)
- Roccellographa muriformis (Sparrius) Ertz & Tehler (2011)
- Roccellographa sorediata (Sparrius, P.James & M.A.Allen) Coppins & Fryday (2012)
