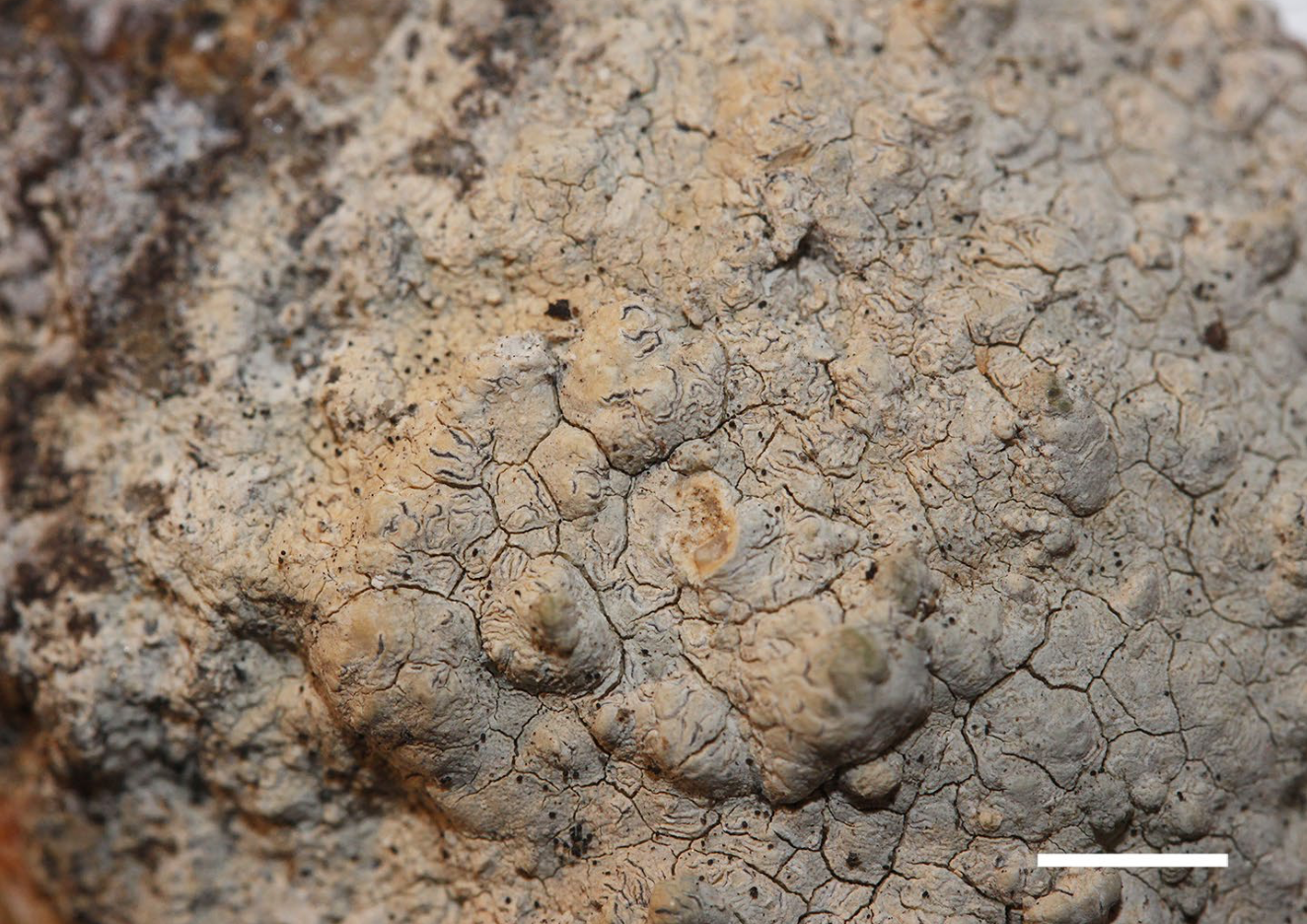
- scale bar = 5 mm

Scientific classification
- Kingdom: Fungi
- Division: Ascomycota
- Class: Arthoniomycetes
- Order: Arthoniales
- Family: Roccellographaceae
- Genus: Fulvophyton
- Species: F. serusiauxii

Binomial name
- Fulvophyton serusiauxii Sparrius & Tehler (2020)

= Fulvophyton serusiauxii =

Species of lichen

Fulvophyton serusiauxii is a species of saxicolous (rock-dwelling) crustose lichen in the family Roccellographaceae. It has a distinct cream-coloured, areolate thallus and specific chemical characteristics. This lichen is only known from its type locality in Mexico where it grows on granite boulders near the Pacific Ocean shore.

== Taxonomy ==
Fulvophyton serusiauxii was first described by lichenologists Laurens Sparrius and Anders Tehler. The species was named in honour of Belgian lichenologist Emmanuël Sérusiaux upon his retirement from the University of Liège. The type specimen was collected by the second author south of Puerto Vallarta in the Mexican state of Jalisco, close to Los Arcos National Underwater Park; there, it was found growing on granitic boulders on the beach.

== Description ==
The thallus of Fulvophyton serusiauxii is thick, areolate, and cream-coloured, with a matte appearance and water-absorbing properties. Its thickness ranges from 100 to 1000 μm. The photobiont is trentepohlioid, and the prothallus is black-brown. The ascomata are lirelline and immersed in areoles. The ascospores are ellipsoid, hyaline, contain 5 septa, and measure 20–22 by 5–6 μm, excluding the perispore. The lichen contains norstictic acid.

=== Similar species ===
Fulvophyton serusiauxii is similar in appearance to the corticolous (bark-dwelling) Fulvophyton klementii, but it has smaller ascospores and different ascomata characteristics. It is also similar to the saxicolous Enterographa subgelatinosa, which has a faint C+ (red) and P+ (yellow) reaction. Fulvophyton calcicola, found on the Atlantic coast in Florida, grows on calcareous rock and contains no secondary compounds.

== Habitat and distribution ==
Fulvophyton serusiauxii is only known from its type locality in Mexico, where it grows on granite boulders near the Pacific Ocean shore. The tidal range along the coastline is minimal, and exposure to saltwater is likely limited to a few days during the hurricane season.
