= Opegrapha ramisorediata =

Scientific classification
- Kingdom: Fungi
- Division: Ascomycota
- Class: Arthoniomycetes
- Order: Arthoniales
- Family: Opegraphaceae
- Genus: Opegrapha
- Species: O. ramisorediata

Binomial name
- Opegrapha ramisorediata Aptroot & M.Cáceres (2017)

Species of lichen

Opegrapha ramisorediata is a rare species of corticolous (bark-dwelling), crustose lichen in the family Opegraphaceae. Known to occur only in northeastern Brazil, it was described as a new species in 2017. It is characterised by a thin, pale greenish-mauve thallus.

== Taxonomy ==
The species Opegrapha ramisorediata was formally described in 2017 by lichenologists André Aptroot and Marcela Cáceres, who discovered it growing on tree bark in the Ecotel garden in Fazendinha (municipality of Macapá, state of Amapá). The species name ramisorediata was chosen due to the branched structure of the soredia, a form of asexual reproduction in lichens. DNA sequencing and subsequent molecular phylogenetic analysis confirmed its placement in the genus Opegrapha. It is closely related to other species in Opegrapha but differs significantly in its chemical makeup and morphological characteristics.

== Description ==
Opegrapha ramisorediata is characterised by a thin, pale greenish-mauve thallus. The thallus initially displays rounded soralia (clusters of soredia), approximately 0.2–0.4 mm in diameter, that eventually cover the entire thallus with a fine layer of yellowish-green soredia. A thin brown line of hypothallus encircles the thallus.

The medulla, or the layer beneath the upper cortex of the thallus, does not have a distinct colour nor does it contain calcium oxalate crystals. The soredia, loosely structured and mimicking the branching pattern of the trentepohlioid algal cells, are about 40–80 μm in diameter. The individual branches are hyaline (transparent) and densely encrusted with crystals, likely of gyrophoric acid. The hyphae (filamentous structures of fungi) are approximately 2–3 μm wide, hyaline, and densely encrusted with similar crystals. The symbiotic green algae in the lichen belong to the genus Trentepohlia.

No ascomata (spore-producing structures) or pycnidia (asexual reproductive structures) have been observed in this species.

=== Similar species ===
Opegrapha ramisorediata is a sterile sorediate crust lichen, similar to some other species in the genus Opegrapha. Notably, it shares similarities with O. salmonea, a tropical sorediate species from the Seychelles, although it differs significantly by the presence of gyrophoric acid instead of lecanoric acid.

== Chemistry ==
The thallus of Opegrapha ramisorediata does not react to ultraviolet light (UV−) and, in terms of standard chemical spot tests, does not change colour with the application of P or K, but is C+ (red). Thin-layer chromatography reveals the presence of gyrophoric acid in the thallus.

== Habitat and distribution ==
This species has been documented only in northeastern Brazil, specifically growing on tree bark in a garden setting.

== See also ==
- List of Opegrapha species
