= Opegrapha serusiauxii =

Scientific classification
- Kingdom: Fungi
- Division: Ascomycota
- Class: Arthoniomycetes
- Order: Arthoniales
- Family: Opegraphaceae
- Genus: Opegrapha
- Species: O. serusiauxii

Binomial name
- Opegrapha serusiauxii Lücking (2008)

Species of lichen-forming fungus

Opegrapha serusiauxii is a species of lichen in the family Opegraphaceae. It was described as a new species in 2008 by Robert Lücking. It is found in Ecuador, where it grows on leaves in the understorey of tropical rainforests. The specific epithet honours the Belgian lichenologist Emmanuël Sérusiaux.

== See also ==
- List of Opegrapha species
