= Opegrapha diffracticola =

Scientific classification
- Kingdom: Fungi
- Division: Ascomycota
- Class: Arthoniomycetes
- Order: Arthoniales
- Family: Opegraphaceae
- Genus: Opegrapha
- Species: O. diffracticola

Binomial name
- Opegrapha diffracticola R.C.Harris & Ladd (2007)
- Type locality: Spring Creek Gap Conservation Area, Missouri

Species of fungus

Opegrapha diffracticola is a lichenicolous fungus (a fungus that lives on lichens) in the family Opegraphaceae. Described in 2007 from the Ozarks of midcontinental North America, this fungus grows exclusively on the crustose lichen Bacidia diffracta, forming black, elongated, slit-like fruiting bodies on both the host's thallus and its apothecia. The species is known from the Ozarks and has also been recorded from Vermont and Wisconsin, likely occurring throughout the range of its host lichen in mesic to dry woodlands on various tree species.

== Taxonomy ==
Opegrapha diffracticola was described as new to science in 2007 by Richard C. Harris and Douglas M. Ladd from the Ozark region of midcontinental North America, where it grows on the crustose lichen species Bacidia diffracta. The type specimen was collected in Maries County, Missouri, in a floodplain forest, where it was found on B. diffracta growing on the trunk of eastern redcedar (Juniperus virginiana). The type is housed in the herbarium of the University of Wisconsin–Madison (WIS).

Harris and Ladd compared the species with other lichenicolous members of the genus. They noted that when its fruiting bodies are crowded together it can resemble older, multi-chambered fruiting bodies of the Opegrapha anomea group, but O. diffracticola differs in producing elongated, slit-like fruiting bodies from the earliest stages rather than starting out somewhat spherical. They also discussed an earlier, invalidly published name ("Opegrapha bacidiae") reported on a different Bacidia host; that taxon was said to differ in having ascospores with more internal partitions (septa).

== Description ==
The fungus forms black, narrow, elongate fruiting bodies (lirellae) on both the thallus and the apothecia of its host, Bacidia diffracta. Infection does not visibly harm the host thallus, but the host apothecia are often darkened and become somewhat misshapen where the fungus develops. Individual lirellae are typically about 0.2–0.5 mm long and 0.1–0.2 mm wide. They may be solitary and scattered or form irregular clusters a few millimeters across, and the slit-like opening is largely hidden by the tightly appressed margins.

Microscopically, the exciple is dark brown to black and becomes greenish-black in potassium hydroxide solution, while the hypothecium is thin and colorless. The hymenium is colorless and shows a patchy iodine reaction that shifts from blue-green toward orange, and the asci are club-shaped (clavate) with eight spores arranged in two rows. The ascospores remain colorless; they are 3-septate, surrounded by a thin halo, and measure about 13–16 × 4.5–5.5 μm. Pycnidia are present; they are brown, spherical, and about 50–100 μm across, producing rod-shaped conidia about 4.5–5.5 × 1.0–1.2 μm.

== Habitat and distribution ==
Because Opegrapha diffracticola grows on Bacidia diffracta, its habitat closely tracks that of its host. In the Ozarks, B. diffracta is widespread in mesic woodlands (often near streams) and is also found in drier woodland settings; it occurs on lightly shaded trunks of various hardwoods and is common on shaded trunks of eastern redcedar (Juniperus virginiana). Harris and Ladd suggested that O. diffracticola likely occurs throughout the range of the host, across the host's full range of habitats and substrates.

Most collections they examined were from the Ozark region, but the species was also recorded from Vermont and Wisconsin. As far as known in the original account, it is confined to Bacidia diffracta and was not found on the presumably closely related B. polychroa, even when the two lichens were growing side by side on the same piece of bark.

== See also ==
- List of Opegrapha species
