= Opegrapha perturbans =

Scientific classification
- Kingdom: Fungi
- Division: Ascomycota
- Class: Arthoniomycetes
- Order: Arthoniales
- Family: Opegraphaceae
- Genus: Opegrapha
- Species: O. perturbans

Binomial name
- Opegrapha perturbans Follmann (2003)

Species of lichen

Opegrapha perturbans is a species of lichenicolous (lichen-dwelling) fungus in the family Opegraphaceae. Discovered on the Pacific coast of Chile, it was described as new to science in 2003 by Gerhard Follman. The holotype was collected in Coquimbo, north Chile in 1838 by the French naturalist Claude Gay. The fungus grows specifically on the thallus of Ingaderia pulcherrima, a fruticose lichen. The species epithet perturbans (Latin for "confusing" or "misleading") refers to the long-standing mistaken identity of its ascomata (fruiting bodies) with the true fructifications of its host lichen.

Opegrapha perturbans is characterised by its lirellate, caterpillar-like ascomata measuring 1.2–3.4 mm long and 0.2–0.4 mm wide, which grow on the branches of I. pulcherrima. The fungus produces cylindrical-clavate asci containing eight colourless, oblong-fusiform ascospores that are typically eight-celled. Unlike many related species, O. perturbans has strongly projecting ascomata with a deeply ridged excipular base. The species has a commensalistic relationship with its host, causing no significant damage to the lichen's structure or chemistry. O. perturbans is endemic to the Mediterranean to subtropical littoral regions of Pacific South America, ranging from approximately 23° to 33° south latitude. This species is of particular interest to lichenologists as it was initially misidentified as the fruiting bodies of I. pulcherrima itself, leading to a century-long misconception about the reproductive structures of its host genus.

== See also ==
- List of Opegrapha species
