= Fulvophyton macrosporum =

Scientific classification
- Kingdom: Fungi
- Division: Ascomycota
- Class: Arthoniomycetes
- Order: Arthoniales
- Family: Roccellographaceae
- Genus: Fulvophyton
- Species: F. macrosporum

Binomial name
- Fulvophyton macrosporum Ertz & Diederich (2017)

Species of lichen

Fulvophyton macrosporum is a species of corticolous (bark-dwelling), crustose lichen in the family Roccellographaceae. Found in the Seychelles, it was formally described as a new species in 2017 by the lichenologists Damien Ertz and Paul Diederich. Its differentiation from the morphologically similar Sclerophyton madagascariense primarily hinges on its 10–14 (and at times, up to 16) septate (partitioned) ascospores and the existence of psoromic acid, while S. madagascariense typically contains 8–10-septate ascospores and features stictic acid. Fulvophyton macrosporum was first identified in Seychelles, in the Praslin National Park, situated southeast of Vallée de Mai. The species was discovered growing on trees between altitudes of 250–360 m (820–1,180 ft). Its species epithet macrosporum alludes to the relatively large ascospores that characterise the species.

The thallus of Fulvophyton macrosporum can measure up to approximately 5 cm (2 in) in diameter and has a continuous, smooth, yellowish-white surface. In terms of thickness, the thallus can vary from very thin to around 280 μm, becoming noticeably thicker near the ascomata. The photobiont partner in this symbiotic relationship is Trentpohlia, a genus of green algae. Ascomata, the fruiting bodies where sexual spores are formed, are generally lined or grouped from 10 to 100, with dimensions of 40–135 μm at the surface. The hymenial disc, the fertile surface bearing the reproductive organs, is characterised by a dark brown to black colouration.
