= Dimidiographa =

Scientific classification
- Domain: Eukaryota
- Kingdom: Fungi
- Division: Ascomycota
- Class: Arthoniomycetes
- Order: Arthoniales
- Family: Roccellographaceae
- Genus: Dimidiographa; Ertz & Tehler (2011)

Type species
- Dimidiographa loandensis (Nyl.) Ertz & Tehler (2011)

Species
- D. graphidiza D. loandensis D. longissima

Genus of lichens

Dimidiographa is a genus of lichen-forming fungi in the family Roccellographaceae. It has three species of crustose lichens, with Dimidiographa loandensis serving as the type species.

== Taxonomy ==
Following a molecular phylogenetic-based reorganization of the order Arthoniales, lichenologists Damien Ertz and Anders Tehler circumscribed Dimidiographa in 2011, with D. loandensis assigned as the type species. The genus name is derived from the distinctive dimidiate excipulum. Dimidiographa is reminiscent of the genus Opegrapha, but it can be distinguished mainly by its unique dimidiate excipulum (where the lateral parts of the excipulum are carbonized, meaning they are dark brown to black and hardened, while the hypothecium, which is the layer beneath the excipulum, remains pale) and the ascospore septation pattern. Among the other genera in the Roccellographaceae, Dimidiographa stands out due to its carbonized excipulum. All three species of Dimidiographa were originally described in the genus Opegrapha.

== Description ==
The thallus of Dimidiographa is crustose and lacks a cortex, and it features a photobiont belonging to the green algal genus Trentepohlia. The ascomata are lirelliform, ranging from semi-immersed to sessile, often flexuose, and measure 0.5–6.5 by 0.15–0.4 mm. The hymenial disc appears slit-like or narrowly exposed, with little to no white pruina. The excipulum is dark brown to carbonized, reacts olivaceous with a solution of potassium hydroxide, and is broadly discontinuous below the hypothecium. The hypothecium is pale, while the epihymenium is brown. Paraphysoids are richly branched and anastomosing.

Asci are cylindrical to clavate, 8-spored, and measure 50–85 by 12–18 μm. Ascospores are hyaline, more or less oblong to fusiform, straight or slightly curved, and measure 14–35 by 3.5–6.5 μm. They have between 4 and 9 septa and follow a macrocephalic ascospore septation pattern. The ascospores become dark brown and granulose when over-mature. Pycnidia may be absent or present, with hyaline conidia that are slightly to strongly curved, measuring 12–28 by 0.75–1 μm.

== Species ==
As of June 2023, Species Fungorum (in the Catalogue of Life) accept 3 species of Dimidiographa.

- Dimidiographa graphidiza (Nyl.) Ertz & Tehler (2011)
- Dimidiographa loandensis (Nyl.) Ertz & Tehler (2011)
- Dimidiographa longissima (Müll.Arg.) Ertz & Tehler (2011)
