= Opegrapha verseghyklarae =

Scientific classification
- Kingdom: Fungi
- Division: Ascomycota
- Class: Arthoniomycetes
- Order: Arthoniales
- Family: Opegraphaceae
- Genus: Opegrapha
- Species: O. verseghyklarae

Binomial name
- Opegrapha verseghyklarae S.Y.Kondr., Lőkös & Hur (2015)

Species of fungus

Opegrapha verseghyklarae is a little-known species of lichenicolous (lichen-dwelling) fungus in the family Opegraphaceae. It is found in the Russian Far East, where it grows on the thalli and apothecia of the crustose lichen Ochrolechia pallescens.

== Taxonomy ==
Opegrapha verseghyklarae was formally described as a new species in 2015 by lichenologists Sergey Kondratyuk, Laszlo Lőkös, and Jae-Seoun Hur. The type specimen was collected from the Land of the Leopard National Park in the Primorsky Krai region of the Russian Far East. There, in a deciduous forest in the Kedrovaya Pad Nature Reserve, the fungus was found growing on the thallus and apothecia of Ochrolechia pallescens, which itself was growing in close association with Ivanpisutia oxneri and species of Catillaria. The species epithet verseghyklarae honours Hungarian lichenologist Klára Verseghy, who, according to the authors, "made important contributions to our knowledge on species diversity of the genus Ochrolechia".

== Description ==
Opegrapha verseghyklarae produces black, rounded ascomata that are up to 0.25 mm in diameter. The ascomata are often empty, or lacking a hymenium. The asci are somewhat club-shaped (subclavate), contain eight spores. These ascospores are hyaline, have three transverse septa and are shaped like an elongated ellipsoid, with dimensions of 13–15 by 5–6 μm. Older spores become brownish from a pigment on the spore wall, and become covered with wart-like growths (verrucae).

Opegrapha anomea is morphologically similar to O. verseghyklarae, but that species has lirellate (not rounded) ascomata, has larger ascospores (17–26 by 6.5–9 μm), and its hosts are both species of Ochrolechia and of Pertusaria.

== Habitat and distribution ==
The fungus is known only from a couple of locations in the Primorsky Krai region of the Russian Far East. Ochrolechia pallescens is the only known host lichen.

Opegrapha verseghyklarae is one of three Opegrapha species known to parasitise members of the genus Ochrolechia; the others are Opegrapha blakii and Opegrapha anomea.

== See also ==
- List of Opegrapha species
