= Opegrapha vulpina =

Scientific classification
- Kingdom: Fungi
- Division: Ascomycota
- Class: Arthoniomycetes
- Order: Arthoniales
- Family: Opegraphaceae
- Genus: Opegrapha
- Species: O. vulpina

Binomial name
- Opegrapha vulpina Vondrák, Kocourk. & Tretiach (2008)

Species of lichen

Opegrapha vulpina is a species of lichenicolous (lichen-eating) fungus in the family Opegraphaceae. It is found in the Czech Republic, Dobruja, Romania, and the Italian Apennine Mountains. It grows parasitically on two species of saxicolous (rock-dwelling), crustose lichens.

== Taxonomy ==
The fungus was formally described as new in 2008 by Jan Vondrák, Jana Kocourková, and Mauro Tretiach. The type specimen was collected from the ruins of the castle Děvičky in the Pavlovské vrchy region of Pavlov (South Moravia) at an altitude of 422 m (1,385 ft); there, the lichen was found growing parasitically on the thallus of the crustose lichen Caloplaca erodens, which itself was growing on west-exposed limestone. The species epithet honours the Czech lichenologist Jiří Liška, friend of the authors, whose English surname means "fox" in English (= vulpes in Latin).

== Description ==
The ascomata are apothecial in form, and usually occur as irregular dark patches on the thallus of the host lichen. They are rounded, measuring about 0.2 mm in diameter, and have a distinct carbonized (blackened) exciple (rim). The asci contains eight ascospores and are fissitunicate, meaning that they have two functional ascal wall layers and discharge of the spores involves the separation of these layers. The ascospores are shaped like narrow ellipsoids and have a transparent coat (perispore) around it, their dimensions are about 14.5 by 6 μm. They are initially hyaline, but become brownish and develop fine granular ornamentation with age. The conidiomata are black pycnidia partially immersed in the host thallus, measuring roughly 80–130 μm; the conidia they produce are narrowly ellipsoid to bacilliform in shape and measure 4.5 by 1.2 μm.

== Habitat and distribution ==
Originally identified from specimens collected in the Czech Republic, the fungus has since been reported from Dobruja, east Romania, and the Apennine Mountains of Italy. Known hosts are Caloplaca erodens and the related species C. albopruinosa, both of which are saxicolous lichens that inhabit limestone outcrops that are exposed to the sun.

== See also ==
- List of Opegrapha species
