= Opegrapha reinkellae =

Scientific classification
- Kingdom: Fungi
- Division: Ascomycota
- Class: Arthoniomycetes
- Order: Arthoniales
- Family: Opegraphaceae
- Genus: Opegrapha
- Species: O. reinkellae

Binomial name
- Opegrapha reinkellae Follmann (2003)

Species of fungus

Opegrapha reinkellae is a species of lichenicolous (lichen-dwelling) fungus in the family Opegraphaceae. Discovered on the Pacific coast of Peru, it was described as new to science in 2003 by Gerhard Follman. The holotype specimen was collected in Peru, possibly from the central region, by A. Winterfeld in the second half of the 19th century. The fungus grows specifically on the thallus of Roccella lirellina, a fruticose lichen. The species epithet reinkellae refers to the genus name Reinkella, which was erroneously applied to the host lichen when its ascomata were mistakenly thought to belong to the lichen itself.

Opegrapha reinkellae is characterised by its variable lirellate ascomata measuring 0.3–0.9 mm long and 0.1–0.3 mm wide, which grow on the apical parts of R. lirellina branches. The fungus produces cylindrical-clavate asci containing eight hyaline, oblong-fusiform ascospores that are typically eight-celled. Notably, O. reinkellae has a parasiticrelationship with its host, deeply penetrating the medulla with suctorial hyphae. The species is a disjunct endemic of the tropical Pacific-Andean littoral of South America, known only from certain localities in Central and North Peru between approximately 5–12° south latitude. Opegrapha reinkellae is of particular interest to lichenologists as it represents the first obligately lichenicolous representative of the genus Opegrapha (in the strict sense) recorded on a member of the Roccellaceae. All known collections of O. reinkellae date from the 19th century, and with its host now considered endangered, the parasite may potentially be extinct.

== See also ==
- List of Opegrapha species
