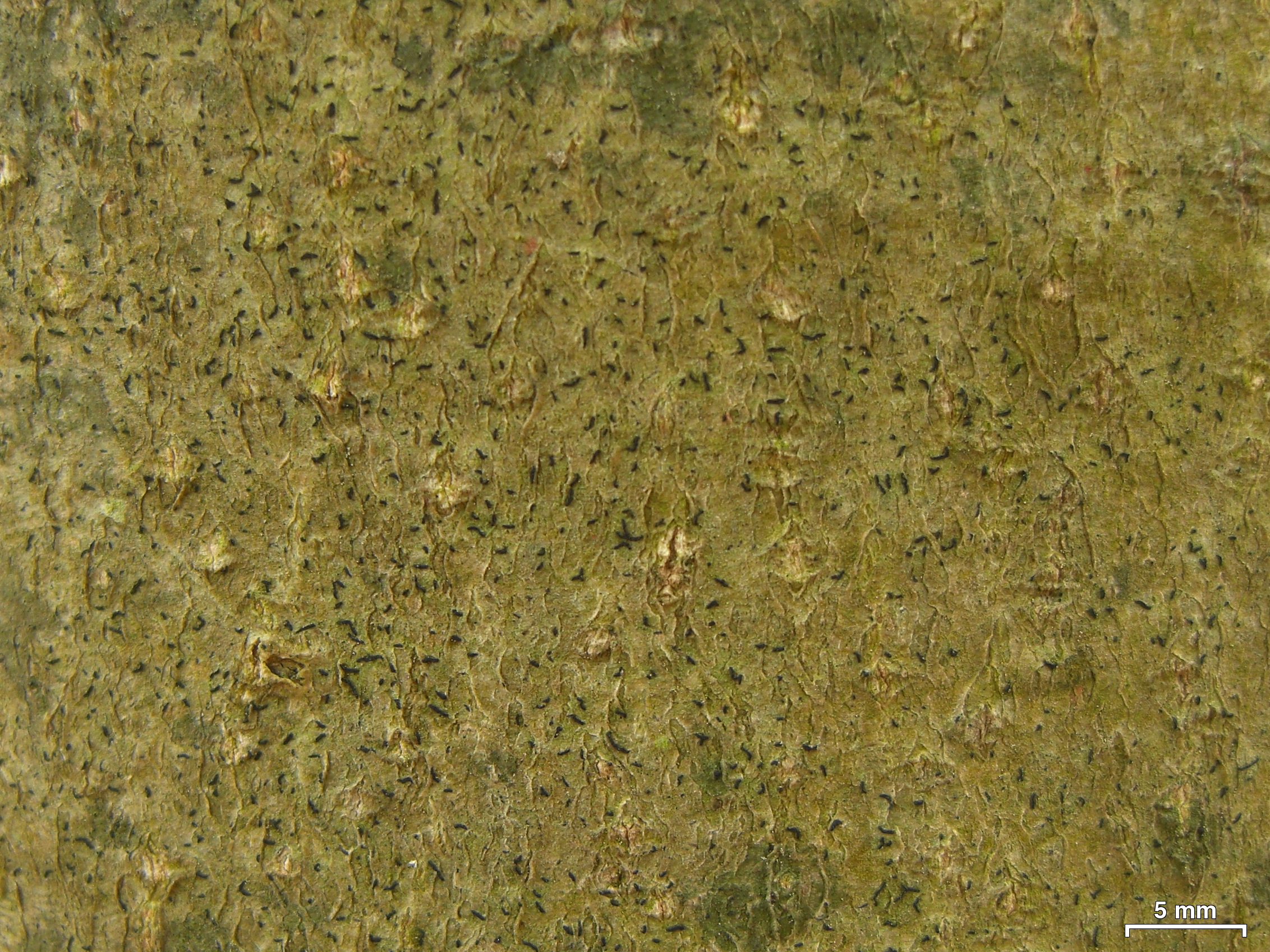

Scientific classification
- Kingdom: Fungi
- Division: Ascomycota
- Class: Arthoniomycetes
- Order: Arthoniales
- Family: Opegraphaceae
- Genus: Opegrapha
- Species: O. vulgata

Binomial name
- Opegrapha vulgata (Ach.) Ach. (1803)

Synonyms
- List: Lichen vulgatus Ach. (1799); Opegrapha lithyrga var. confluens Ach. (1810); Hysterina vulgata (Ach.) Gray (1821); Opegrapha cinerea Chevall. (1822); Graphis vulgata (Ach.) Wallr. (1831); Graphis vulgata var. periblastetica Wallr. (1831); Opegrapha atra var. vulgata (Ach.) Schaer. (1836); Pyrenotea lutea Leight. (1851); Opegrapha confluens (Ach.) Stizenb. (1865); Opegrapha devulgata Nyl. (1879); Opegrapha vulgata var. cinerea (Chevall.) Blomb. & Forssell (1880); Opegrapha vulgata var. parallela Müll.Arg. (1893); Opegrapha vulgata var. devulgata (Nyl.) H.Olivier (1902)

= Opegrapha vulgata =

Species of lichen-forming fungus

Opegrapha vulgata is a species of corticolous (bark-dwelling) script lichen in the family Opegraphaceae. It was first scientifically described by Swedish lichenologist Erik Acharius in 1798, as Lichen vulgata. He transferred it to the genus Opegrapha in 1803. The lichen has a cosmopolitan distribution, and grows on the bark of a wide variety of tree species. Opegrapha niveoatra is similar in appearance, but can be distinguished form O. vulgata by its longer, curved conidia. O. lithygra is another lookalike, but it grows on rocks instead of bark.

== See also ==
- List of Opegrapha species
