= List of Opegrapha species =

This is a list of species in the genus Opegrapha, which consists mostly of lichen-forming fungi and lichenicolous (lichen-dwelling) fungi. As of January 2026, Species Fungorum (in the Catalogue of Life) accepts 150 species of Opegrapha.

== A ==
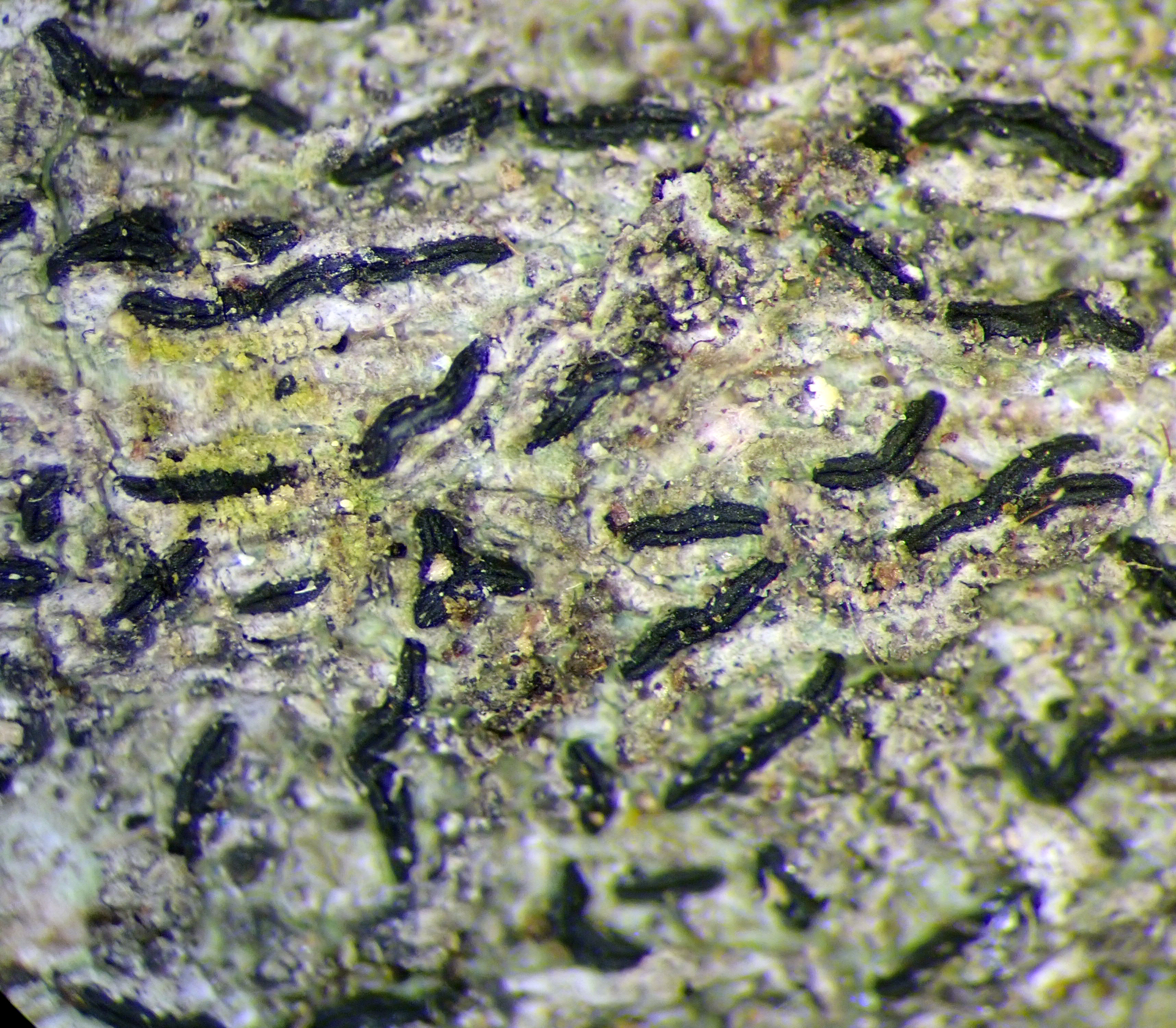
Opegrapha agelaeoides

- Opegrapha acervulata Dufour (1818)
- Opegrapha acicularis Riddle (1918)
- Opegrapha adpicta Zahlbr. (1932)
- Opegrapha adtinens Nyl. (1883)
- Opegrapha agelaea Fée (1837)
- Opegrapha agelaeina Jatta (1911)
- Opegrapha agelaeoides Nyl. (1867)
- Opegrapha aggregata Groenh. (1954)
- Opegrapha albidoatra Fink (1927)
- Opegrapha alboatra Nyl. (1891)
- Opegrapha albocinerea Vain. (1901)
- Opegrapha alborimosa Zahlbr. (1909)
- Opegrapha allorgei B.de Lesd. (1943)
- Opegrapha angulosa Müll.Arg. (1895)
- Opegrapha angustata Mont. (1842)
- Opegrapha anomea Nyl. (1857)
- Opegrapha antiqua Lesq. (1873)
- Opegrapha aperiens Vain. (1890)
- Opegrapha approximata Chevall. (1822)
- Opegrapha areniseda Nyl. (1875)
- Opegrapha arengae Vain. (1921)
- Opegrapha arthoniicola Coppins & S.Y.Kondr. (2021)
- Opegrapha arthrospora Vain. (1890)
- Opegrapha assidens Nyl. (1890)
- Opegrapha astraea Tuck. (1866)
- Opegrapha aterrima Fée (1874)
- Opegrapha aterula Müll.Arg. (1884)
- Opegrapha aurantiaca B.de Lesd. (1940)
- Opegrapha australis P.M.McCarthy (2022) – Australia

== B ==
- Opegrapha bacillosa Zahlbr. (1936)
- Opegrapha bahamensis Riddle (1920)
- Opegrapha betulae DC. (1815)
- Opegrapha betulinoides B.de Lesd. (1922)
- Opegrapha biseptata Müll.Arg. (1893)
- Opegrapha bisokeana Ertz (2009)
- Opegrapha blakii Ertz & Diederich (2004)
- Opegrapha bogoriensis Zahlbr. (1928)
- Opegrapha borbonica Ertz (2009)
- Opegrapha brachycarpa Müll.Arg. (1880)
- Opegrapha brachycarpoides Vain. (1896)
- Opegrapha brevis Coppins (1987)
- Opegrapha brevissima Kalb & Hafellner (1995)
- Opegrapha breviuscula Fée (1874)
- Opegrapha briancoppinsii S.Y.Kondr., Lőkös & Hur (2016)
- Opegrapha bryoriae Zhurb. (2014)
- Opegrapha buelliae Zhurb. (2013)
- Opegrapha bullata Pers. (1805)

== C ==
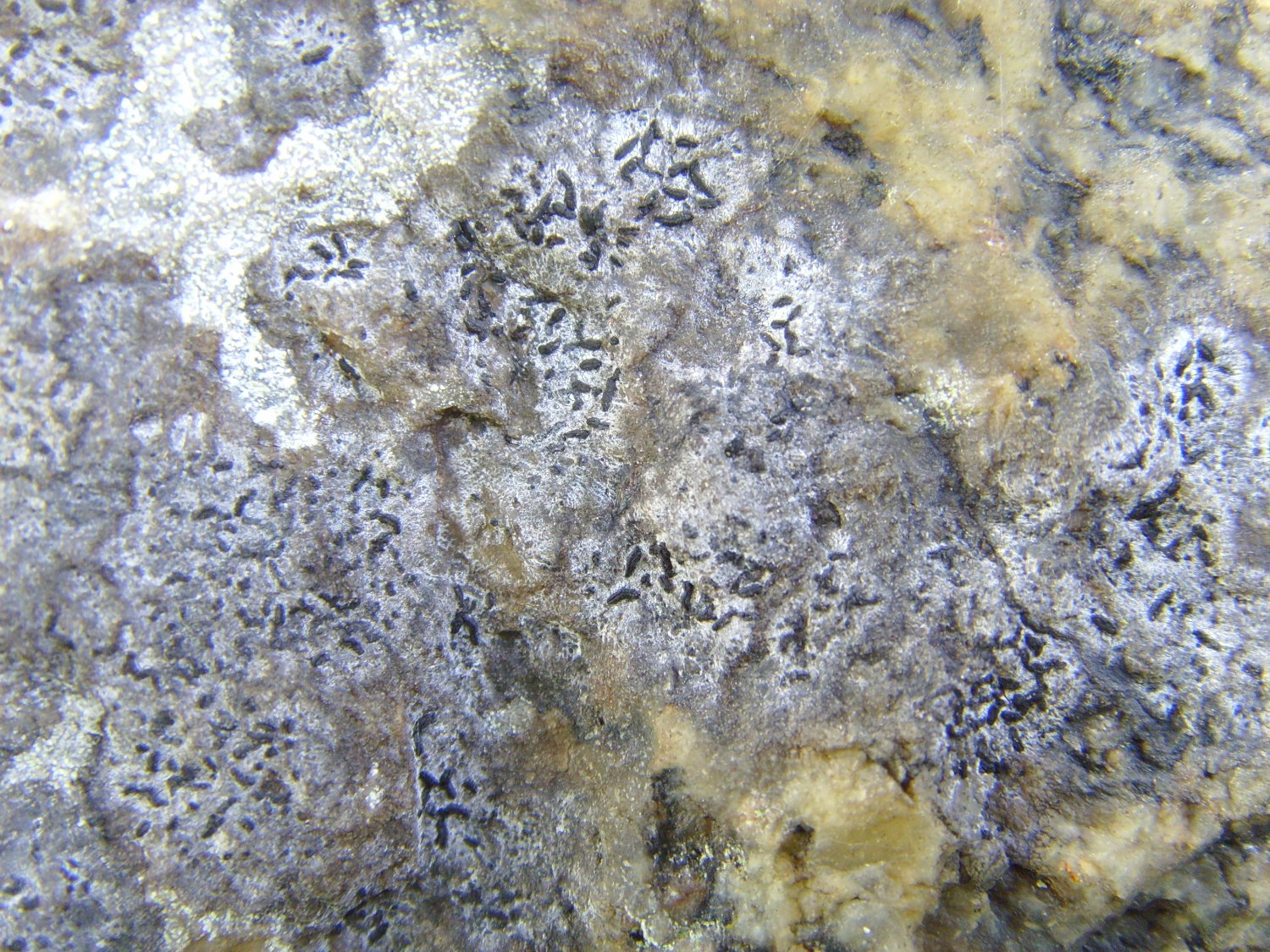
Opegrapha cesareensis

- Opegrapha cactacearum Riedl (1964)
- Opegrapha caerulea S.Joseph, G.P.Sinha & V.S.Ramach. (2018)
- Opegrapha caesioatra J.Steiner (1902)
- Opegrapha calva Fée (1874)
- Opegrapha cana Chevall. (1822)
- Opegrapha candida Müll.Arg. (1895)
- Opegrapha capensis Müll.Arg. (1888)
- Opegrapha cerebralis Lam. (1816)
- Opegrapha cesareensis Nyl. (1868)
- Opegrapha chapsae Etayo (2017)
- Opegrapha chionoplaca Redinger (1940)
- Opegrapha chlorographa Nyl. (1866)
- Opegrapha chlorographoides Vain. (1890)
- Opegrapha cicatricula Chevall. (1824)
- Opegrapha cinereovirens Kremp. (1876)
- Opegrapha cladoniicola Ertz & Diederich (2003) – host: Cladonia ochrochlora; Hawaii
- Opegrapha columbina Riddle (1920)
- Opegrapha concatenata Vain. (1921)
- Opegrapha confertoides Torrente & Egea (1992)
- Opegrapha confertula Nyl. (1861)
- Opegrapha conglomerans Müll.Arg. (1894)
- Opegrapha connivens Fée (1825)
- Opegrapha consimillima Nyl. (1875)
- Opegrapha consors Vain. (1921)
- Opegrapha contracta Vain. (1890)
- Opegrapha corinnae Egea & Ertz (2007)
- Opegrapha corumbensis Redinger (1940)
- Opegrapha coryli Chevall. (1822)
- Opegrapha crustacea Chevall. (1822)
- Opegrapha cryptotheciae Matzer (1996)
- Opegrapha curvula Redinger (1940)
- Opegrapha cymbiformis Raddi (1822)

== D ==
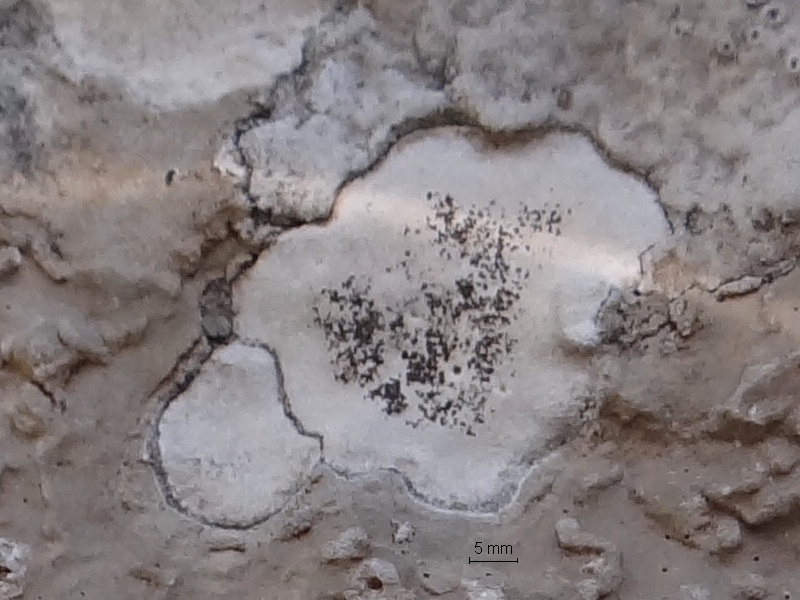
Opegrapha dolomitica

- Opegrapha danica Erichsen (1942)
- Opegrapha deblockiae Ertz (2009)
- Opegrapha declinans Müll.Arg. (1891)
- Opegrapha dekeselii Ertz (2009)
- Opegrapha delicata Vain. (1930)
- Opegrapha demutata Nyl. (1879)
- Opegrapha deusta De Not. ex Jatta (1881)
- Opegrapha diagrapha Nyl. (1868)
- Opegrapha diagraphoides Nyl. (1869)
- Opegrapha diaphorella Stizenb. (1891)
- Opegrapha diaphoriza Nyl. (1888)
- Opegrapha diatona Nyl. (1880)
- Opegrapha dicarpigera Redinger (1940)
- Opegrapha difficilior Nyl. (1876)
- Opegrapha difficilis Dufour (1818)
- Opegrapha diffracticola R.C.Harris & Ladd (2007)
- Opegrapha diffusa Chevall. (1822)
- Opegrapha dimidiata Müll.Arg. (1882)
- Opegrapha dirinicola Fink (1927)
- Opegrapha dirinoides Nyl. (1855)
- Opegrapha discoidea Jatta (1881)
- Opegrapha discolor Vain. (1921)
- Opegrapha dolomitica (Arnold) Clauzade & Cl.Roux ex Torrente & Egea (1989)
- Opegrapha dracaenarum Müll.Arg. (1882)
- Opegrapha duckei Bat., J.L.Bezerra & Cavalc. ex Lücking & Sérus. (1998)

== E ==
- Opegrapha ectolechiacearum Matzer & R.Sant. (1996)
- Opegrapha egyptiaca Müll.Arg. (1880)
- Opegrapha elevata DC. (1815)
- Opegrapha encephalographoidea Diederich (1997)
- Opegrapha enterographae Etayo (2010)
- Opegrapha epiporina Matzer (1996)
- Opegrapha erosa Egea & Ertz (2007)
- Opegrapha excentrica Chevall. (1824)
- Opegrapha exiguella Zahlbr. (1936)
- Opegrapha exornata Zahlbr. (1921)

== F ==
- Opegrapha farinacea Fée (1825)
- Opegrapha fauriei B.de Lesd. (1910)
- Opegrapha fertilis Müll.Arg. (1895)
- Opegrapha flexuososerpens Maheu & Werner (1934)
- Opegrapha foreaui (C.Moreau & M.Moreau) Hafellner & R.Sant. (2002)
- Opegrapha frustulosa Vain. (1930)
- Opegrapha fumosa Coppins & P.James (1992)
- Opegrapha fusca Opiz (1857)
- Opegrapha fuscescens Kremp. (1876)
- Opegrapha fuscomaculans Nyl. (1869)
- Opegrapha fuscothallina Lücking & Matzer (2008)
- Opegrapha fuscovirens Müll.Arg. (1891)
- Opegrapha fuscula Redinger (1940)

== G ==
- Opegrapha gemina Schumach. (1803)
- Opegrapha geographica Chevall. (1822)
- Opegrapha geographicicola (Arnold) Hafellner (1994)
- Opegrapha georgii Werner (1936)
- Opegrapha gibba Chevall. (1822)
- Opegrapha gigantea Chevall. (1826)
- Opegrapha gilmorei P.M.McCarthy & Elix (2017)
- Opegrapha glaucoma Chevall. (1822)
- Opegrapha gracilescens Zahlbr. (1921)
- Opegrapha granulosa S.Joseph & G.P.Sinha (2012)
- Opegrapha graphicula A.Massal. (1860)
- Opegrapha gregalis Vain. (1921)
- Opegrapha grossulina Müll.Arg. (1891)
- Opegrapha gyalolechiae Y.Joshi (2018)
- Opegrapha gyrocarpoides Müll.Arg. (1884)
- Opegrapha gyrophorica Seavey & J.Seavey (2014)

== H ==
- Opegrapha hafellneri E.Zimm., Etayo & F.Berger (2016)
- Opegrapha halophila Brodo & Tønsberg (2019)
- Opegrapha hassei Zahlbr. (1912)
- Opegrapha heterospora Vain. (1921)
- Opegrapha heufleriana A.Massal. (1860)
- Opegrapha hochstetteri Coppins (2021)
- Opegrapha howeana P.M.McCarthy (2022) – Australia
- Opegrapha hoyae Vain. (1921)
- Opegrapha humilis Müll.Arg. (1893)
- Opegrapha hybrida Flot. (1825)
- Opegrapha hyperphysciae van den Boom (2021)
- Opegrapha hysterimorpha L.Marchand (1829)

== I ==
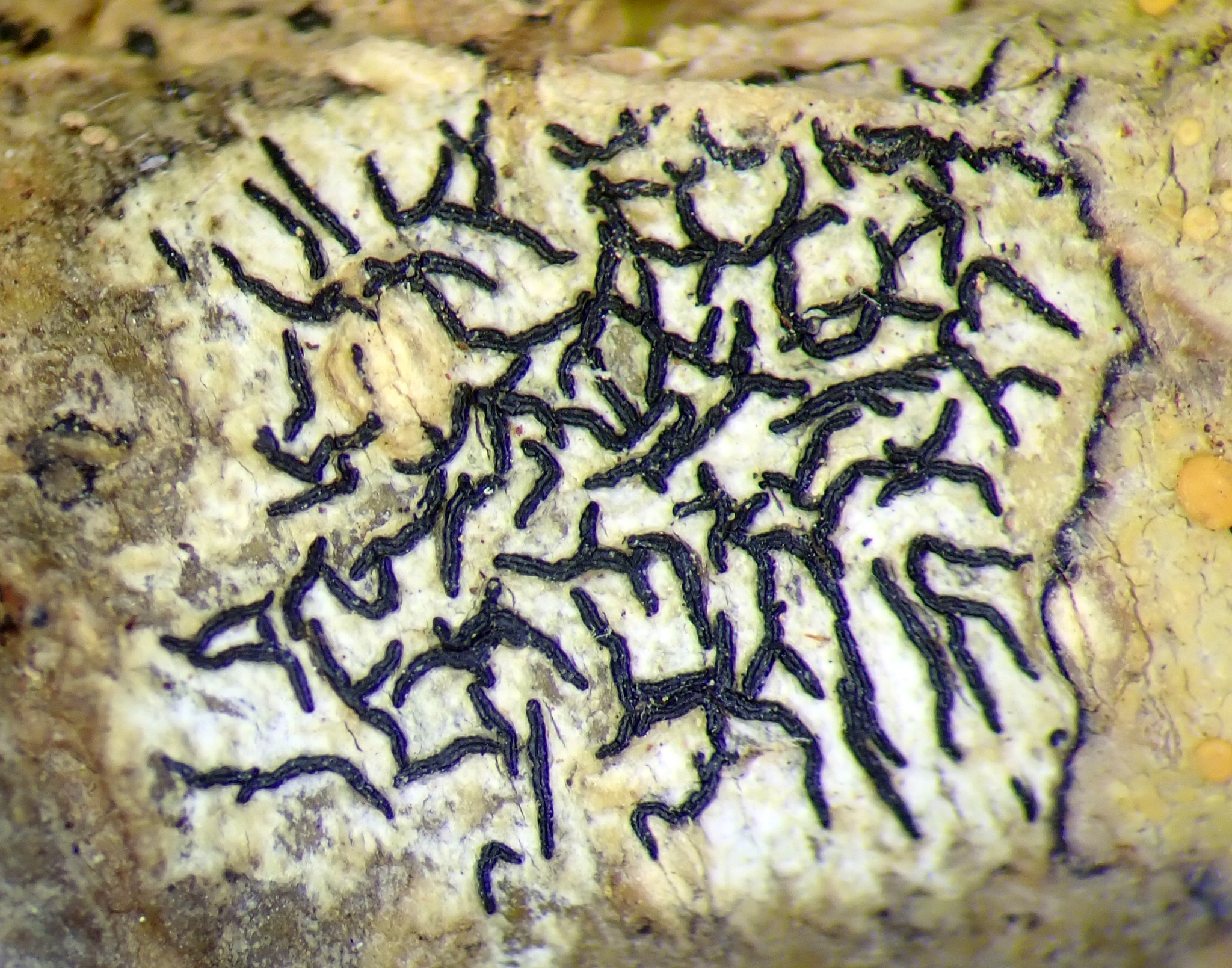
Opegrapha intertexta

- Opegrapha implexa Chevall. (1824)
- Opegrapha inaequalis Fée (1825)
- Opegrapha inaequans Nyl. (1890)
- Opegrapha inconspicua Ertz, S.R.Clayden & K.E.Driscoll (2021)
- Opegrapha insidens (J.Steiner) S.Y.Kondr. (2002)
- Opegrapha insularis Degel. (1941)
- Opegrapha interalbata Nyl. (1867)
- Opegrapha interalbescens Nyl. (1866)
- Opegrapha intertexta C.Knight (1884)
- Opegrapha interveniens Müll.Arg. (1891)
- Opegrapha intrusa Stirt. (1881)
- Opegrapha invadens Etayo (2007) – host: Pannaria farinosa; Chile
- Opegrapha irosina Vain. (1921)
- Opegrapha isabellina Riddle (1920)

== K ==
- Opegrapha kalbii Matzer (1996)
- Opegrapha keyensis Seavey & J.Seavey (2014)
- Opegrapha klementii Cretz. (1938)
- Opegrapha koerberiana Müll.Arg. (1862)

== L ==
- Opegrapha lacteella Müll.Arg. (1893)
- Opegrapha lactifera Zahlbr. (1936)
- Opegrapha laeta Stirt. (1879)
- Opegrapha lambinonii Sérus. (1978)
- Opegrapha lamyi (O.J.Rich. ex Nyl.) Triebel (1989)
- Opegrapha lavicola H.Magn. (1955)
- Opegrapha lepidella Nyl. (1886)
- Opegrapha leptocarpoides Zahlbr. (1923)
- Opegrapha leptochroma A.Massal. ex Kremp. (1871)
- Opegrapha leptographa Nyl. (1889)
- Opegrapha leptoplacella (Müll.Arg.) Vězda (1967)
- Opegrapha leptospora Werner & M.Choisy (1932)
- Opegrapha leptotera Nyl. (1868)
- Opegrapha leptoterodes Nyl. (1900)
- Opegrapha leucinia Müll.Arg. ex Shirley (1889)
- Opegrapha leucocarpa Faurel, Ozenda & Schotter (1953)
- Opegrapha leucophaea Chevall. (1822)
- Opegrapha leucoplaca Müll.Arg. (1895)
- Opegrapha levidensis Willey (1892)
- Opegrapha lichenicola G.Thor, Lücking & Tat.Matsumoto (2000)
- Opegrapha lignicola Bachm. (1933)
- Opegrapha lilacina A.Massal. (1853)
- Opegrapha lineata Chevall. (1822)
- Opegrapha linguata Redinger (1940)
- Opegrapha lithyrga Ach. (1810)
- Opegrapha lithyrgiza Vain. (1890)
- Opegrapha longula Nyl. (1873)
- Opegrapha lopezariae Etayo & Sipman (2017)
- Opegrapha lurida Duby (1830)
- Opegrapha luridescens Jatta (1882)
- Opegrapha lusitanica Egea & Torrente (1992)
- Opegrapha luzonensis Sérus. (1985)

== M ==
- Opegrapha maldiveana Ertz (2009)
- Opegrapha maligna Triebel (1989)
- Opegrapha malmei Redinger (1940)
- Opegrapha maroccana Müll.Arg. (1879)
- Opegrapha matzeri Lücking (1998)
- Opegrapha mazosiae Matzer (1996)
- Opegrapha mazosioides Sérus. (1997)
- Opegrapha medusulina Nyl. (1895)
- Opegrapha medusuliza Nyl. (1888)
- Opegrapha megaconidia C.Knight (1882)
- Opegrapha megagonidia C.Knight (1882)
- Opegrapha melanogramma Kremp. (1876)
- Opegrapha melanospila Müll.Arg. (1877)
- Opegrapha menegazziae F.Berger & E. Zimm. (2022)
- Opegrapha menyharthii Müll.Arg. (1893)
- Opegrapha microsema Nyl. (1863)
- Opegrapha microsperma Müll.Arg. (1891)
- Opegrapha microspora Müll.Arg. (1882)
- Opegrapha millegrana Redinger (1940)
- Opegrapha minutula Müll.Arg. (1895)
- Opegrapha modesta Müll.Arg. (1892)
- Opegrapha moroziana Lendemer (2009)
- Opegrapha mozambica Vain. (1930)
- Opegrapha multiseptata Müll.Arg. (1880)
- Opegrapha muriformis Maheu & Werner (1934)
- Opegrapha murina Kremp. (1876)
- Opegrapha murorum Fée (1827)
- Opegrapha mutabilis Chevall. (1826)

== N ==
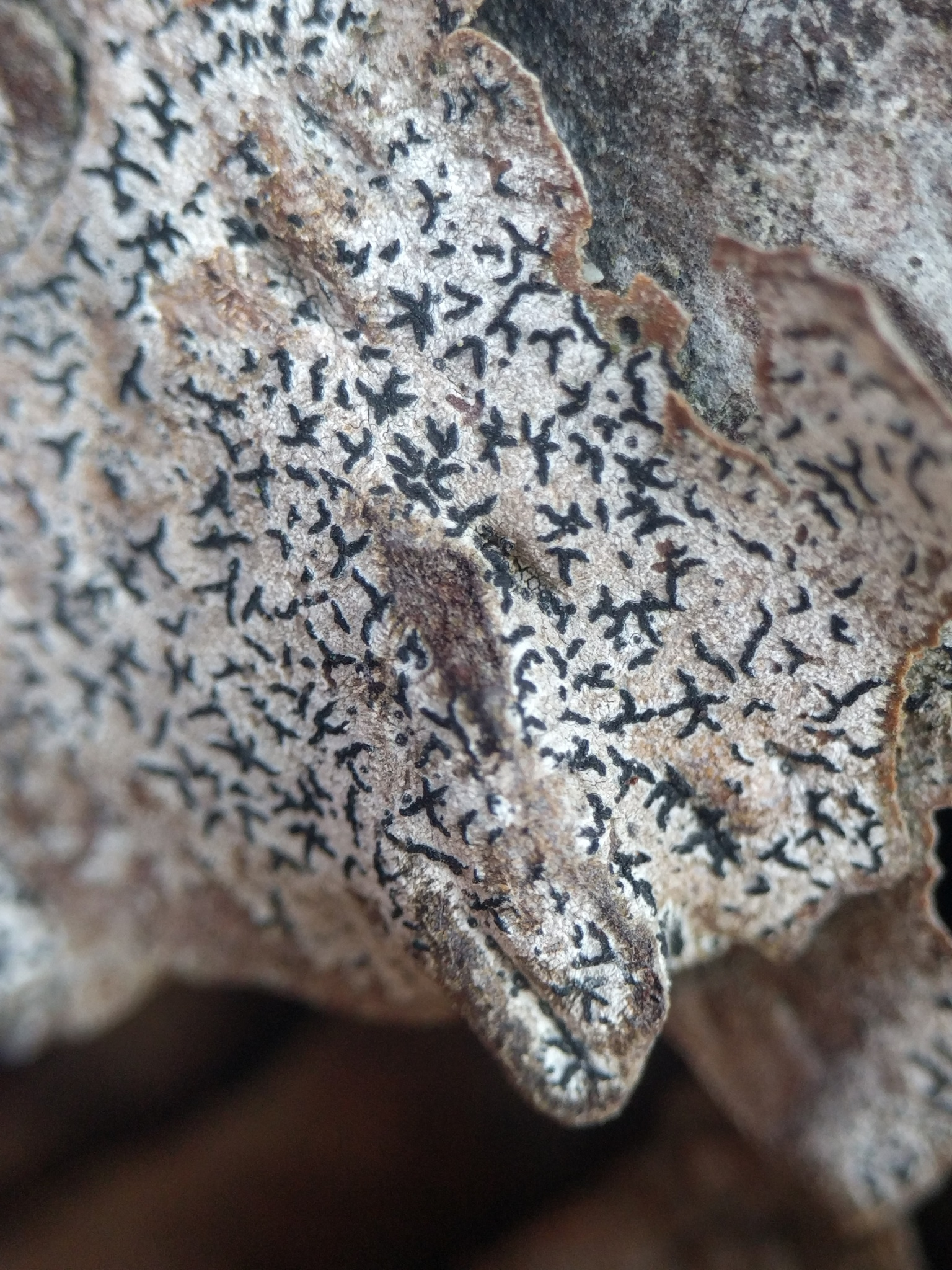
Opegrapha niveoatra

- Opegrapha navicularis Vain. (1896)
- Opegrapha nigeriensis C.W.Dodge (1953)
- Opegrapha nigra Dufour (1821)
- Opegrapha nimbosa Ach. (1803)
- Opegrapha niveoatra (Borrer) J.R.Laundon (1963)
- Opegrapha nothella Nyl. (1866)
- Opegrapha nyungweana Ertz (2009)

== O ==
- Opegrapha obscurata Redinger (1940)
- Opegrapha obtusella Nyl. (1921)
- Opegrapha obvelata Vain. (1915)
- Opegrapha ochroplaca Redinger (1940)
- Opegrapha oleagina Riddle (1923)
- Opegrapha opaca Nyl. (1853)
- Opegrapha ophites Tuck. (1916)
- Opegrapha oraria P.M.McCarthy (2022) – Australia
- Opegrapha ovaliformis Ach. (1809)
- Opegrapha ovalis Chevall. (1824)

== P ==
- Opegrapha palmicola Müll.Arg. (1895)
- Opegrapha papillata Chevall. (1824)
- Opegrapha parasitica (A.Massal.) H.Olivier (1906)
- Opegrapha parmeliiperda Ertz, K.E.Driscoll & S.R.Clayden (2021)
- Opegrapha parvula Nyl. (1876)
- Opegrapha paschalis Zahlbr. (1926)
- Opegrapha pauciexcipulata Aptroot & Yazıcı (2009)
- Opegrapha pellicula Dufour (1818)
- Opegrapha perturbans Follmann (2003)
- Opegrapha perturbata Chevall. (1826)
- Opegrapha pertusariicola Coppins & P.James (1979)
- Opegrapha phaeophysciae R.Sant., Diederich, Ertz & Christnach (2005)
- Opegrapha phyllobathelii Matzer & R.Sant. (1996)
- Opegrapha physciae Y.Joshi (2019)
- Opegrapha physciaria (Nyl.) D.Hawksw. & Coppins (1992)
- Opegrapha physcidiae Kalb & Elix (1995)
- Opegrapha picea Pers. (1810)
- Opegrapha pigozziana Etayo & Aptroot (2005)
- Opegrapha placidiicola (Zhurb.) Nav.-Ros. & Cr.Romero (2020)
- Opegrapha planiuscula Chevall. (1822)
- Opegrapha plectocarpoidea Diederich (1997)
- Opegrapha populina Chevall. (1826)
- Opegrapha porinicola Matzer (1996)
- Opegrapha primana Nyl. (1863)
- Opegrapha prolificans Redinger (1940)
- Opegrapha prominula Chevall. (1822)
- Opegrapha prostii Nyl. (1855)
- Opegrapha protocetrarica Seavey & J.Seavey (2014)
- Opegrapha pruinosa Fingerh. (1829)
- Opegrapha pseudoagelaea Müll.Arg. (1889)
- Opegrapha pulicaria Chevall. (1822)
- Opegrapha pulicaris Röhl. (1813)
- Opegrapha pulvinata Rehm ex Arnold (1869)
- Opegrapha punctata Chevall. (1824)
- Opegrapha punctulata Dufour (1818)

== Q ==
- Opegrapha quinqueseptula Zahlbr. (1917)
- Opegrapha quintana Redinger (1940)

== R ==
- Opegrapha ramealis Chevall. (1824)
- Opegrapha ramisorediata Aptroot & M.Cáceres (2017)
- Opegrapha ramosa B.de Lesd. (1925)
- Opegrapha reactiva (Alstrup & D.Hawksw.) Etayo & Diederich (2008)
- Opegrapha regnellii Redinger (1940)
- Opegrapha reinkellae Follmann (2003)
- Opegrapha rimicola Chevall. (1822)
- Opegrapha riograndensis Redinger (1940)
- Opegrapha rionegrensis Redinger (1940)
- Opegrapha riopiedrensis Fink (1927)
- Opegrapha rissoensis Redinger (1940)
- Opegrapha rosea B.de Lesd. (1925)
- Opegrapha rotunda Hafellner (1994)
- Opegrapha rouxiana Nav.-Ros. & Hladun (1995)
- Opegrapha rubefacta Räsänen (1946)
- Opegrapha rubida Chevall. (1822)
- Opegrapha rufidula Fée (1874)
- Opegrapha rupestris Pers. (1794)

== S ==
- Opegrapha salmonea Ertz & Diederich (2017)
- Opegrapha sawyeriana Coppins (2021)
- Opegrapha saxicola Ach. (1814)
- Opegrapha sbarbaronis B.de Lesd. (1953)
- Opegrapha semiatra Müll.Arg. (1886)
- Opegrapha septemseptata Vain. (1901)
- Opegrapha serusiauxii Lücking (2008)
- Opegrapha sexlocularis Vain. (1896)
- Opegrapha signatella Vain. (1926)
- Opegrapha sipmanii Matzer (1996)
- Opegrapha sordidescens Vain. (1896)
- Opegrapha spadopolia Nyl. (1865)
- Opegrapha sparsella Müll.Arg. (1888)
- Opegrapha sphaerophoricola Isbrand & Alstrup (1992)
- Opegrapha sphaerula Duby (1830)
- Opegrapha spodolaeina C.Knight (1884)
- Opegrapha spodopolia Nyl. (1867)
- Opegrapha spuria Chevall. (1826)
- Opegrapha stellanigra Etayo (2017)
- Opegrapha stellata C.Knight (1884)
- Opegrapha stellulata Chevall. (1824)
- Opegrapha stenoleuca Zahlbr. (1921)
- Opegrapha stipata Chevall. (1826)
- Opegrapha stizorina Chevall. (1824)
- Opegrapha strigulae R.Sant. ex Matzer & R.Sant. (1996)
- Opegrapha subabnormis Fink (1927)
- Opegrapha subcentrifuga Nyl. (1859)
- Opegrapha subclausa Zahlbr. (1930)
- Opegrapha subdiaphora Nyl. (1890)
- Opegrapha subdictyospora M.Cáceres, E.L.Lima & Aptroot (2013) – Brazil
- Opegrapha subdifficilis Nyl. (1888)
- Opegrapha subdimidiata Ertz (2009)
- Opegrapha subgraphidiza Zahlbr. (1926)
- Opegrapha subhiascens Nyl. (1886)
- Opegrapha submaritima Hafellner (2007)
- Opegrapha subnebula Chevall. (1822)
- Opegrapha subpulveracea L.Marchand (1829)
- Opegrapha subrimulosa Nyl. (1866)
- Opegrapha subrufescens B.de Lesd. (1914)
- Opegrapha subsimilata Nyl. (1863)
- Opegrapha subsulcata Müll.Arg. (1892)
- Opegrapha subtrilocularis S.Joseph, G.P.Sinha & V.S.Ramach. (2018)
- Opegrapha subvulgata Nyl. (1869)
- Opegrapha suecica Källsten ex G.Thor (2004)
- Opegrapha sulphurata Payer (1850)
- Opegrapha symbiotica Müll.Arg. (1883)

== T ==
- Opegrapha tapetica Zahlbr. (1932)
- Opegrapha tenuior Stirt. (1879)
- Opegrapha thallincola B.de Lesd. (1935)
- Opegrapha thelotrematis Coppins (1987)
- Opegrapha tiliacea Chevall. (1822)
- Opegrapha trassii S.Y.Kondr. & Coppins (1998)
- Opegrapha tremens Chevall. (1824)
- Opegrapha trilocularis Müll.Arg. (1893)
- Opegrapha trochodes Coppins, F.Berger & Ertz (2008)
- Opegrapha tuckermanii H.Magn. (1955)
- Opegrapha tunetana B.de Lesd. (1932)

== U ==
- Opegrapha ugandensis Ertz (2009)
- Opegrapha ulleungdoensis S.Y.Kondr., Lőkös & Hur (2016)
- Opegrapha ulmaria Chevall. (1822)
- Opegrapha umbellulariae Zahlbr. (1902)
- Opegrapha umbrosa O.Behr (1954)
- Opegrapha unicolor A.Rich. (1834)
- Opegrapha uniseptata Matzer (1996)
- Opegrapha urosperma Fée (1874)

== V ==
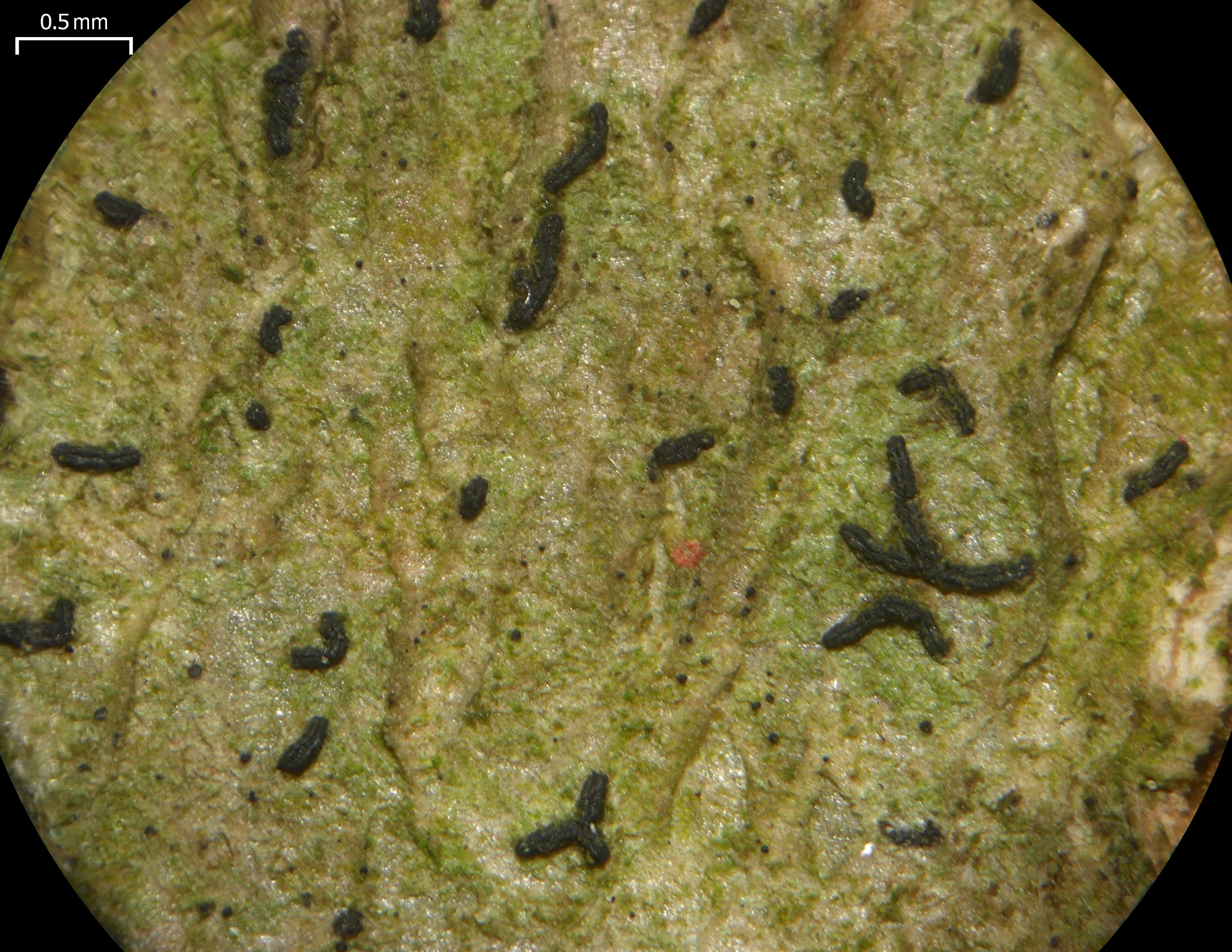
Opegrapha vulgata

- Opegrapha variegata Chevall. (1822)
- Opegrapha vermelhana Vain. (1930)
- Opegrapha vermicellifera (J.Kunze) J.R.Laundon (1963)
- Opegrapha vermiformis Chevall. (1822)
- Opegrapha verseghyklarae S.Y.Kondr., Lőkös & Hur (2015)
- Opegrapha versiformis Chevall. (1822)
- Opegrapha virescens Müll.Arg. (1893)
- Opegrapha viridula Redinger (1940)
- Opegrapha viridulata J.Steiner (1897)
- Opegrapha vulgaris Humb. (1793)
- Opegrapha vulgata (Ach.) Ach. (1803)
- Opegrapha vulpina Vondrák, Kocourk. & Tretiach (2008)

== X ==
- Opegrapha xanthocarpa Zwackh ex Nyl. (1880)
- Opegrapha xanthonica Aptroot & M. Cáceres (2017)
- Opegrapha xylographiza Nyl. (1875)
- Opegrapha xylographoides J.Steiner (1915)

== Z ==
- Opegrapha zanei A.Massal. (1861)
- Opegrapha zaratensis Redinger (1940)
