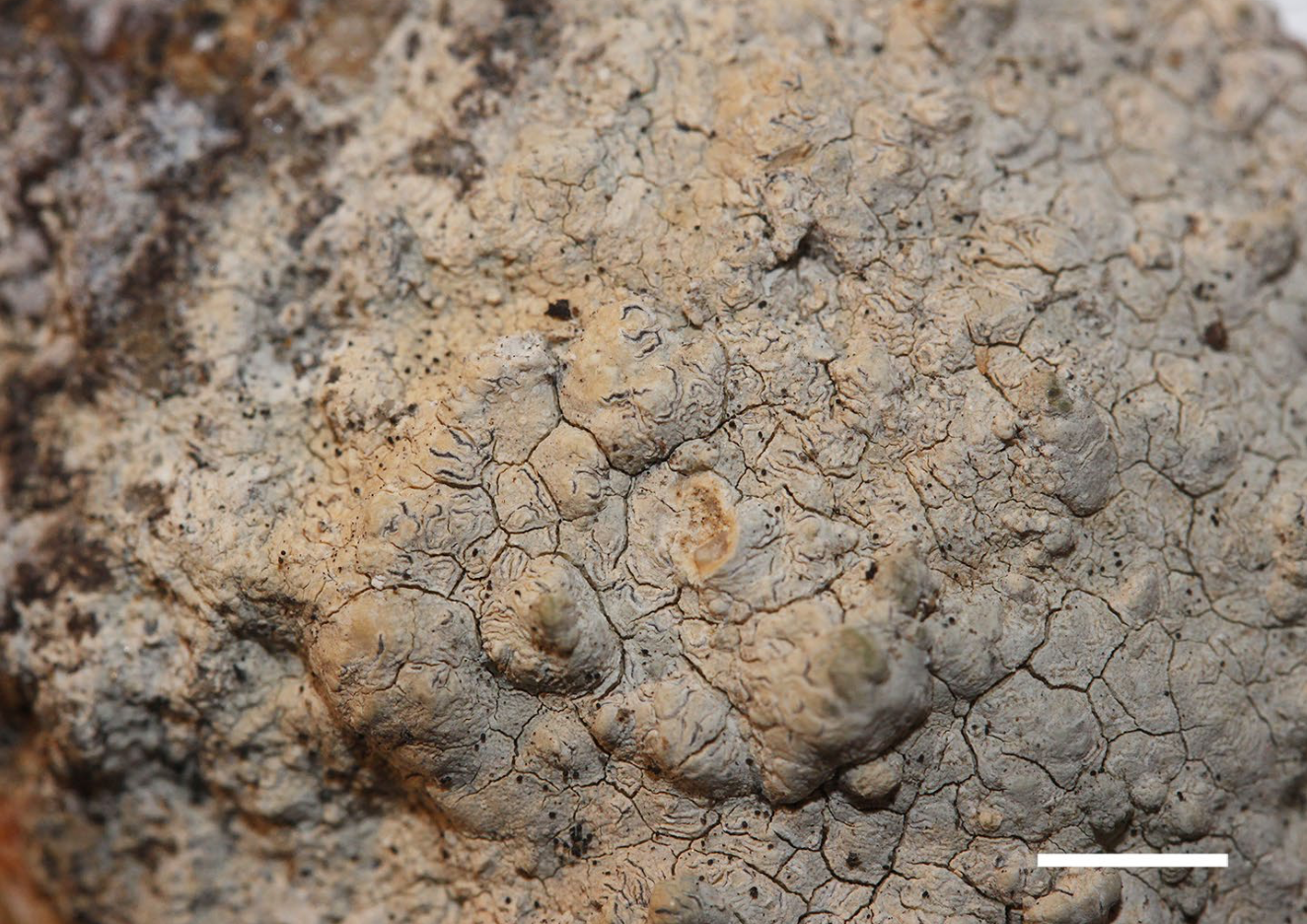
- Fulvophyton serusiauxii; scale bar = 5 mm

Scientific classification
- Domain: Eukaryota
- Kingdom: Fungi
- Division: Ascomycota
- Class: Arthoniomycetes
- Order: Arthoniales
- Family: Roccellographaceae
- Genus: Fulvophyton; Ertz & Tehler (2011)

Type species
- Fulvophyton stalactinum (Nyl.) Ertz & Tehler (2011)

= Fulvophyton =

Genus of lichens

Fulvophyton is a genus of lichen-forming fungi in the family Roccellographaceae. It has 11 species. Fulvophyton is characterised by its crust-like thallus, which is often pale yellowish-brown in colour. This genus features a photobiont from the green algal genus Trentepohlia and exhibits a unique arrangement of reproductive structures.

== Taxonomy ==
The genus was circumscribed in 2011 by lichenologists Damien Ertz and Anders Tehler, as part of a molecular phylogenetic-based restructuring of the order Arthoniales. The genus encompasses species that were previously classified in the genus Sclerophyton, as proposed by Laurens Sparrius in 2004. However, these species deviate from the type of that genus due to the presence of rounded to ellipsoid ascomata, which are often covered in white pruina, and a hyaline or pale hypothecium. The type species of Fulvophyton is F. stalactinum, a lichen first described by William Nylander in 1855 (as Chiodecton stalactinum).

== Description ==
The thallus of Fulvophyton is crustose and lacks a cortex; it often has an algal-free zone formed by interwoven hyphae. The ascomata are punctiform or shortly lirellate, and immersed in the thallus, ranging from 0.05 to 0.6 by 0.05–0.3 mm in size. The hymenial disc is usually exposed and covered with white pruina.

The excipulum is thin, hyaline or brown, measuring between 5–35 μm. The hypothecium is hyaline or pale brown, while the epihymenium displays a brown colouration. Paraphysoids are branched and anastomosing. Asci are cylindrical to clavate and 8-spored, measuring 60–120 by 12–25 μm.

Ascospores are hyaline, fusiform or oblong, straight or slightly curved, featuring 3–7 (up to 12) distosepta. They exhibit a macrocephalic ascospores septation pattern, measuring 20–50 by 5–9 μm, and are surrounded by a distinct gelatinous sheath. Pycnidia are immersed and punctiform, appearing black. Conidia are hyaline, filiform, and curved, with dimensions of 12–18 by 0.8–1 μm.

== Species ==
As of May 2023, Species Fungorum (in the Catalogue of Life) accept 11 species of Fulvophyton.

- Fulvophyton calcicola (Sparrius) Tehler & Ertz (2013)
- Fulvophyton cerei (Schiman-Czeika) Tehler (2017)
- Fulvophyton desertorum (Sparrius) Ertz & Tehler (2011)
- Fulvophyton klementii (Follmann) Tehler (2017)
- Fulvophyton macrosporum Ertz & Diederich (2017)
- Fulvophyton murex (Egea & Torrente ex Sparrius) Ertz & Tehler (2011)
- Fulvophyton rostratum (Egea & Torrente) Ertz & Tehler (2011)
- Fulvophyton serusiauxii Sparrius & Tehler (2020) – Mexico
- Fulvophyton sorediatum (Sparrius, P.James & M.A.Allen) Tehler & van den Boom (2017)
- Fulvophyton stalactinum (Nyl.) Ertz & Tehler (2011)
- Fulvophyton subseriale (Nyl.) Ertz & Tehler (2011)
