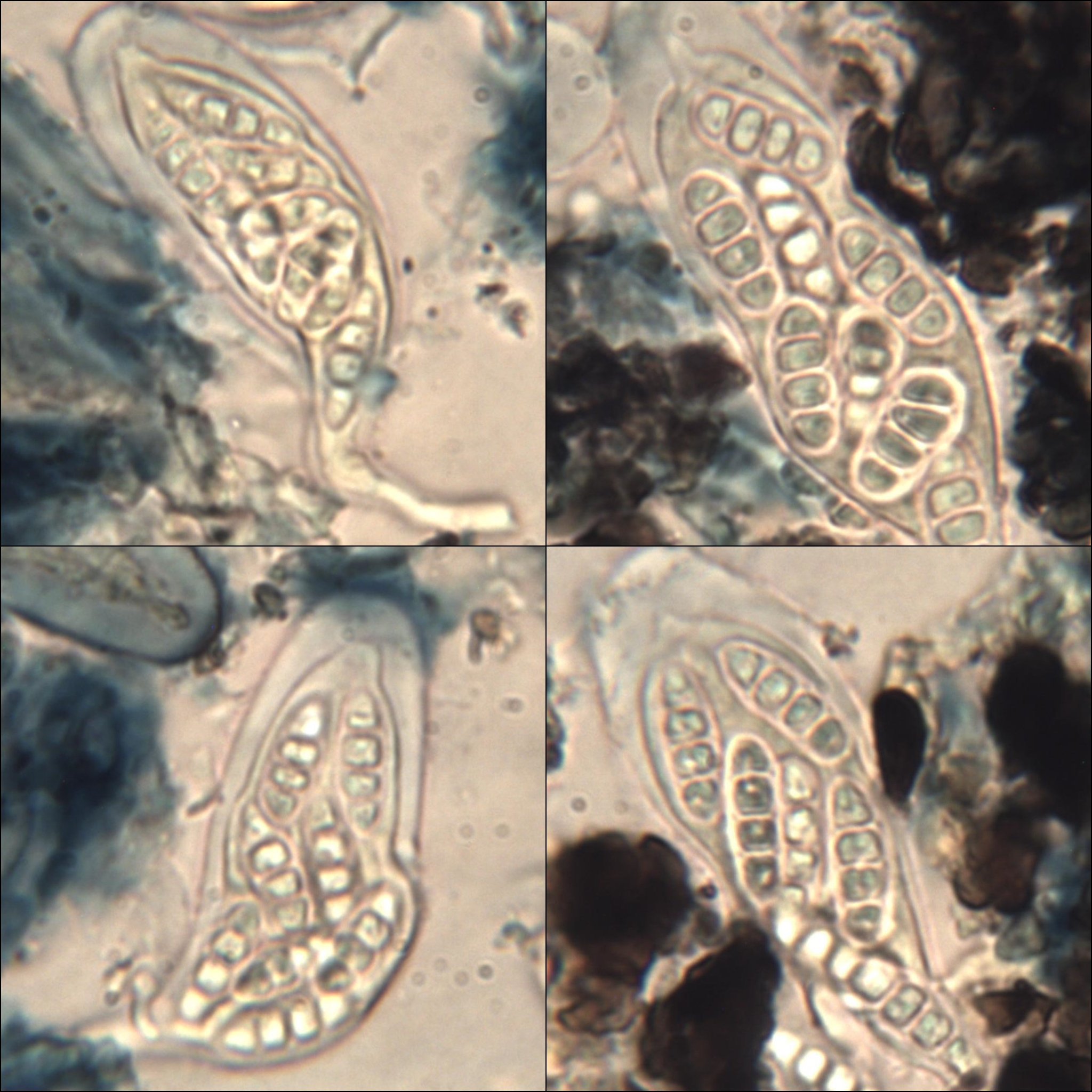
- Asci and ascopores of Opegrapha physciaria, 1000x magnification. The fungus was growing on the foliose lichen Xanthoria parietina.

Scientific classification
- Kingdom: Fungi
- Division: Ascomycota
- Class: Arthoniomycetes
- Order: Arthoniales
- Family: Opegraphaceae
- Genus: Opegrapha
- Species: O. physciaria

Binomial name
- Opegrapha physciaria (Nyl.) D.Hawksw. & Coppins

Synonyms
- List: Lecidea physciaria Nyl. (1897); Buellia physciaria (Nyl.) H.Olivier (1903); Leciographa physciaria (Nyl.) H.Olivier (1906); Phacopsis varia Tul. (1852); Phacothecium varium (Tul.) Trevis. (1857); Celidium varium (Tul.) Körb. (1865); Arthonia varia (Tul.) Jatta (1900)

= Opegrapha physciaria =

Species of fungus

Opegrapha physciaria is a species of lichenicolous (lichen-dwelling) fungus in the family Opegraphaceae. This tiny black fungus lives harmlessly within the tissues of the common sunburst lichen (Xanthoria parietina), producing small dark disc-shaped fruiting bodies that emerge from the host's surface. It is found in Europe and North America, typically growing on tree bark in woodlands where its host lichen forms bright orange patches.

== Taxonomy ==
It was first formally described as a new species in 1897 by the Finnish lichenologist William Nylander, who placed it in the genus Lecidea. David Hawksworth and Brian J. Coppins transferred it to the genus Opegrapha in 1992.

== Description ==
Opegrapha physciaria is a minute fungus that lives parasymbiotically on the common sunburst lichen (Xanthoria parietina). It threads its colourless hyphae through the host's tissue rather than forming a thallus of its own; the only part visible to the naked eye is its reproductive bodies. These begin life submerged in the lichen, then burst through the surface as tiny, black, non-powdery discs (ascomata) about 0.7 mm across. When first exposed the discs are roughly circular, but they may elongate slightly with age; several often crowd together in dense patches, while others remain solitary. A firm, continuous wall (excipulum) surrounds each disc and merges below them, measuring roughly 40–45 μm in height. Inside, a clear hymenium about 65 μm tall is threaded with branched, gel-coated filaments (paraphysoids) whose swollen brown tips form a pseudo-epithecium that roofs the spore layer. Treatment with iodine after a mild alkali wash turns the hymenium blue, indicating the presence of starch-like compounds.

The asci are bitunicate—built from two separable walls that pop apart to discharge the spores—and are club-shaped, 45–50 × 18 μm, each producing eight spores. Unlike many relatives they lack the dark, starch-positive ring usually seen at the ascus apex and instead possess a small, pale ocular chamber through which the spores escape. The ascospores themselves are smooth, ellipsoid and three-celled (containing two internal cross-walls), measuring 12–16 × 6–8 μm. They start out hyaline (colourless) but darken to a warm brown as minute pigment granules accumulate on the outer coat (perispore), which is only about 1 μm thick. Nearby, sunken black pycnidia release curved, colourless conidia 6–7.5 × 1 μm that may assist in asexual spread. Together these features—immersed, black, erumpent discs; three-celled spores that brown with age; and immersion in Xanthoria tissue without damaging it—distinguish O. physciaria from similar lichen-dwelling species.

== Habitat and distribution ==
Opegrapha physciaria has been recorded from Europe and North America. It is an obligate lichenicolous fungus that grows on the thallus of the widespread sunburst lichen Xanthoria parietina. Verified material shows it is most frequently encountered in oceanic or sub-Mediterranean woodlands where Xanthoria forms bright orange patches on rough bark. A recently documented Iberian population occurred at 950 m elevation in open juniper–holm-oak forest, where the host lichen coated old trunks of Juniperus oxycedrus within a community classed as Juniperion thuriferae–Quercetum rotundifoliae. Earlier collections place the species in Atlantic north-Spanish woodland on a solitary poplar (Populus sp.), and on mature deciduous or conifer bark in lowland Britain and Sweden, indicating a preference for well-lit, nutrient-enriched bark of trees that also favour Xanthoria.

Although the fungus was described from the Paris area in 1827, confusion with look-alikes such as O. parasitica has long obscured its true range. Critical re-examination of herbarium specimens finds reliable nineteenth- and twentieth-century records from France (Paris, Marennes, Fontainebleau), Germany (as Celidium varium), Sweden and northern Spain. Fieldwork adds scattered Mediterranean outposts in Castellón and Biscay provinces of Spain, but no contemporary material has yet been verified from central or eastern Europe. Because historic reports from outside Europe are unsubstantiated, the species is currently regarded as a very rare European parasite whose apparently disjunct distribution almost certainly reflects under-collecting and past misidentifications rather than genuine endemism.

The fungus appears to behave as a benign "parasymbiont": its minute black fruit-bodies emerge from the host surface without visibly harming Xanthoria. Local densities are often highest where Xanthoria forms thick, well-developed cushions—such as sun-exposed trunks, fence rails or siliceous coastal rocks—suggesting that the microclimate requirements of the parasite mirror those of its photobiont-bearing host. Where suitable bark and host colonies coincide, O. physciaria can be found from sea-level cliff faces to montane juniper stands, but even in such habitats it remains sporadic and is easily overlooked.

== See also ==
- List of Opegrapha species
