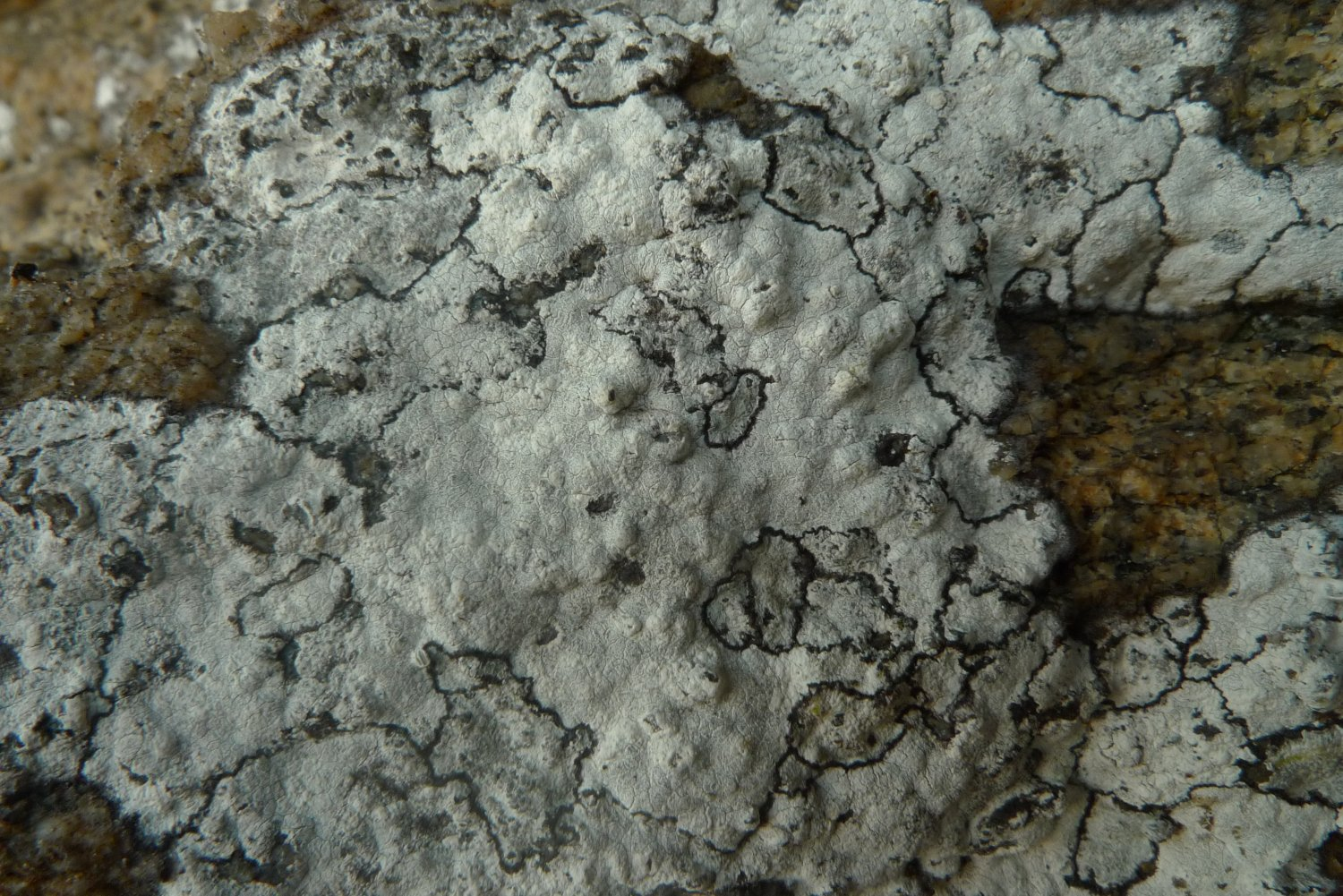
- Roccellographa circumscripta, France

Scientific classification
- Kingdom: Fungi
- Division: Ascomycota
- Class: Arthoniomycetes
- Order: Arthoniales
- Family: Roccellographaceae; Ertz & Tehler (2011)

Type genus
- Roccellographa J.Steiner (1902)

Genera
- Dimidiographa; Fulvophyton; Roccellographa

= Roccellographaceae =

Family of lichen-forming fungi

Roccellographaceae is a family of lichen-forming fungi in the order Arthoniales. It contains three genera: Dimidiographa, Fulvophyton, and Roccellographa.

== Taxonomy ==
The family was circumscribed by Damien Ernst and Anders Tehler in 2011 after a phylogenetic study of the Arthoniales. It is named after its type genus, Roccellographa. Before this publication, this genus was monotypic, containing the single species Roccellographa cretacea, endemic to Socotra and Somalia. Three species have since been added to Roccellographa.

Genus Fulvophyton was created to contain species formerly placed in Sclerophyton, but differing from the generic type by having rounded to ellipsoid, often white pruinose ascomata, and a hyaline or pale hypothecium. Genus Dimidiographa differs from other Roccellographaceae genera in having a blackened (carbonized) excipulum (the ring-shaped layer surrounding the hymenium).

== Description ==
Members of the Roccellographaceae have a thallus that is either crustose or somewhat fruticose. The photobiont partners are green algae in genus Trentepohlia. The ascomata are either point-like (punctiform) or comma-like (lirelliform). The hypothecium, a layer of tissue immediately below the hymenium, is hyaline or pale brown. The asci (spore-bearing cells) are cylindrical to club-shaped (clavate). Paraphysoids (refers to structures that form from the stretching of tissues present before the asci develop) are branched or anastomosed. Ascospores are usually hyaline (rarely brown), spindle-shaped (fusiform) or oblong, and often have a gelatinous covering.

== Genera ==
- Dimidiographa Ertz & Tehler (2011) – 3 spp.
- Fulvophyton Ertz & Tehler (2011) – 6 spp.
- Roccellographa J.Steiner (1902) – 4 spp.
