= Julius Steiner =

Austrian teacher and lichenologist (1844–1918)

- Born: 1844; Bludenz, Austrian Empire
- Died: 1918; Vienna, Austria-Hungary
- Education: University of Vienna
- Known for: Studies on lichen pycnoconidia; contributions to the lichen funga of Austria
- Scientific career
- Fields: Lichenology, botany
- Workplaces: k.k. Staatsgymnasium, Vienna
- Author abbrev. (botany): J.Steiner

Julius Steiner (1844–1918) was an Austrian secondary-school teacher and lichenologist. He spent most of his career teaching at the k.k. Staatsgymnasium in Vienna's eighth district and became a Schulrat (school councillor). Trained in natural sciences with an emphasis on botany at the University of Vienna, he earned a doctorate and was later granted the title of professor.

Steiner worked extensively on lichen collections made by other botanists from the Mediterranean region, Asia Minor, the Caucasus, and parts of northern and eastern Africa. He published several papers on the lichen funga of Austria, including a series of "Adnotationes lichenographicae" ("Notes on lichenology") in the journal Österreichische Botanische Zeitschrift between 1913 and 1915. He also added a number of species to the known lichen funga of Austria, such as Arthopyrenia carinthiaca, Biatorella latericola, Buellia trifracta, Calicium ornicolum and Lecanora pleiospora.

A particular focus of his research was the morphology of pycnoconidia (asexual spores produced in pycnidia). His detailed investigations showed their value for the classification of lichens and were regarded by contemporaries as an important contribution to lichen systematics.

Steiner was born in Bludenz, Austria, in 1844 and died in Vienna in 1918.

== Eponymy ==
Steiner's standing in the field is reflected in the number of taxa that were named in his honour, including the genera Steinera and Steineropsis and several species in diverse lichen and fungus groups. The following species were named for Steiner: Acarospora steineri H.Magn. (1933); Buellia steineri Servít (1937); B. steineri H.Magn. (1945) nom. illegit.; Camarosporium steineri Petr. (1963); Cucurbitaria steineri Petr. (1963); Diploschistes steineri Szatala (1941); Lecanora steineriana Zahlbr. (1928); Parmelia steineri Gyeln. (1938); P. steineri C.W.Dodge (1959) nom. illegit.; Placidium steineri Wettst. (1889); Pleurostromella steineri Petr. (1963); Rinodina steineri Zahlbr. (1909); Rosellinia steineriana Keissl. (1920); Usnea steineri Zahlbr. (1909); Verrucaria steineri Kušan (1930); and Xanthoria steineri I.M.Lamb (1936).
