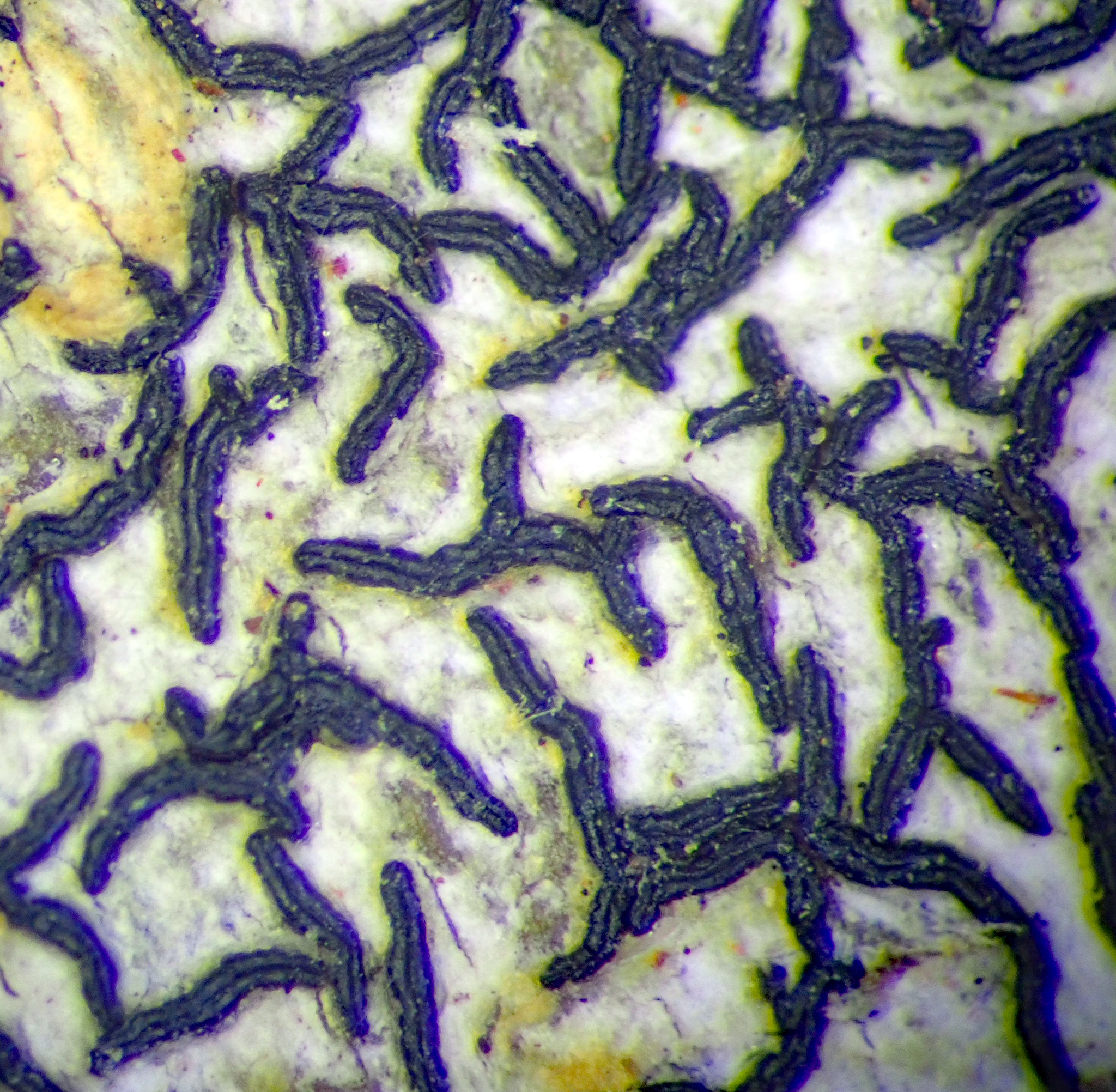
- Opegrapha intertexta

Scientific classification
- Kingdom: Fungi
- Division: Ascomycota
- Class: Arthoniomycetes
- Order: Arthoniales
- Family: Opegraphaceae
- Genus: Opegrapha; Ach. (1809)

Type species
- Opegrapha vulgata (Ach.) Ach. (1809)

Species
- about 150 species

Synonyms
- List: Hysterina (Ach.) Gray (1821); Kalaallia Alstrup & D.Hawksw. (1990); Leciographa A.Massal. (1854); Lecoglyphis Clem. (1909); Mycopegrapha Vain. (1921); Opegrapha † Hysterina Ach. (1810); Opegrapha subgen. Sclerographa Vain. (1890); Opegraphella Müll.Arg. (1890); Opegraphoidea Fink (1933); Opegraphomyces E.A.Thomas ex Cif. & Tomas. (1953); Phragmographum Henn. (1905); Phyllographa (Müll.Arg.) Räsänen (1943); Sclerographa (Vain.) Zahlbr. (1923); Xylastra A.Massal. (1855)

= Opegrapha =

Genus of lichen-forming fungi

Opegrapha is a genus of mostly lichen-forming fungi in the family Opegraphaceae. These lichens form crusty patches on bark, rock, or other lichens, and are easily recognised by their distinctive black, slit-like or rounded fruiting bodies that look like tiny scribbles or dashes on the surface. The genus includes about 150 accepted species found worldwide, with most partnering with orange-pigmented green algae, though some live as parasites on other lichens. Opegrapha species are distinguished from similar genera by their combination of branched internal filaments, ascospores with multiple septa, and a specialised spore-release mechanism.

Opegrapha has a cosmopolitan distribution, occurring in both temperate and tropical regions, though the genus is especially diverse in warm, humid climates. Most species grow on tree bark in shaded woodlands, while others colonise sheltered rock surfaces. The genus is sensitive to environmental conditions and serves as an indicator of air quality: many species declined dramatically during periods of industrial sulfur dioxide pollution but have rebounded in regions where emissions have been reduced, with formerly rare species now increasingly encountered on city trees and in parkland. Around seventy species are lichenicolous, growing parasitically on specific host lichens rather than forming independent thalli, and these forms can indicate ecological continuity as they require stable, undisturbed habitats where their hosts flourish.

== Description ==
Opegrapha species form a crust-like thallus that adheres tightly to bark, rock or even the surface of other lichens. This crust may be paper-thin or rather thick and is often cracked into a mosaic of small areoles. Colours range from chalk white through shades of grey and mauve to dark brown or olive-green, and a narrow dark prothallus sometimes outlines individual colonies. Most members partner with the orange-pigmented green alga Trentepohlia, but a few live parasitically on lichens that employ different algal partners. Powdery reproductive patches (soralia) are uncommon and, when present, remain discrete rather than fusing into large swathes.

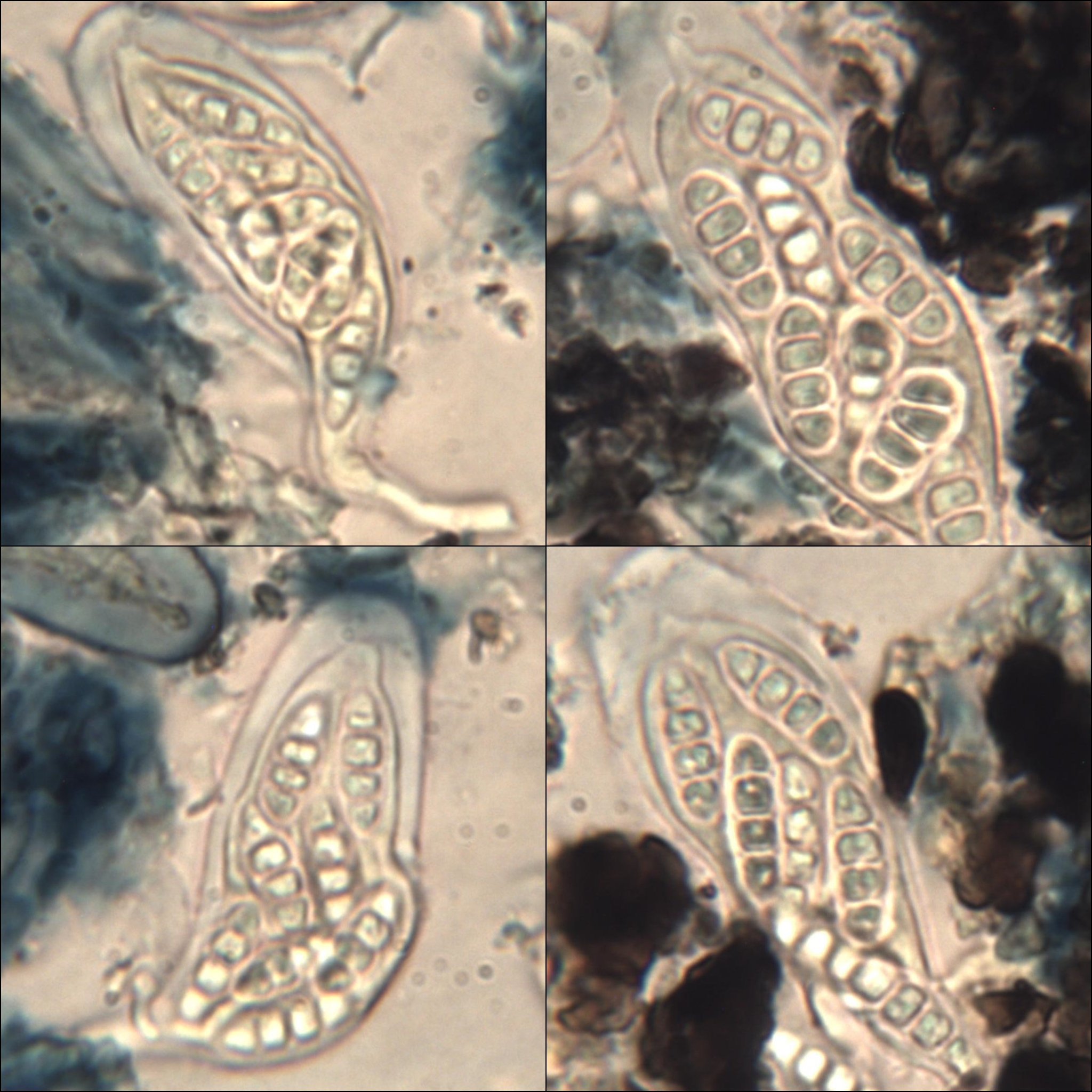
Asci and ascopores of the lichenicolous fungus Opegrapha physciaria

The sexual fruiting bodies are characteristically lirellate apothecia: elongated, often branching slits that resemble tiny scribbles in the thallus. In bark-dwelling or lichenicolous forms these slits may round off into short dashes or nearly circular discs. Each apothecium sits flush with, or slightly above, the substrate; it lacks a true rim of thallus tissue, though a thin pseudo-margin may form. A tough black wall (excipulum) encloses the fertile layer and usually remains opaque, so the exposed surface looks like a narrow, glossy cleft; when thin sections are treated with the K spot test the internal tissues turn olive or reddish-brown, a useful field test. Inside, a gel-filled layer of branched, cross-walled filaments (paraphysoids) weaves among the club-shaped asci. These asci split apart along two walls when the eight ascospores are released—a mechanism called fissitunicate dehiscence—and a faint blue-staining ring at the tip can be seen with iodine staining. The spindle-shaped spores bear multiple cross-walls (septa), start colourless and may develop a reddish-brown, grainy coat as they age. Minute black pycnidia, partially sunk in the crust, exude colourless curved conidia that provide an alternative means of dispersal. Despite the chemical diversity found in many roccellaceous lichens, Opegrapha generally lacks secondary lichen products.

Taken together—crustose thallus, slit-like or rounded black apothecia with a pigmented excipulum, branched paraphysoids, multiseptate spores and fissitunicate asci—these traits distinguish Opegrapha from superficially similar genera such as Graphis (unbranched paraphyses and iodine-positive spores), Enterographa (much narrower, clustered apothecia) and Schismatomma (persistent thalline margin). Conidial size and shape are especially diagnostic at the species level, as is the number of spore septa. Ongoing molecular work shows that traditional morphological boundaries between Opegrapha and allied genera (e.g. Lecanactis, Lecanographa) need further refinement, but the suite of characters outlined above still provides a practical field definition of the genus.

== Habitat and distribution ==
Opegrapha is a cosmopolitan genus, with roughly 300 species described worldwide. These lichens occur in both temperate and tropical regions, though they are especially diverse in warm, humid climates. The majority of Opegrapha species are epiphytic on tree bark: they grow on a wide range of broad-leaved trees (and occasionally conifers), often in shaded woodlands or mature forests. A smaller number of species are saxicolous, colonizing sheltered rock surfaces (both siliceous and calcareous rocks). It is relatively rare for Opegrapha to inhabit other substrates, though a few cases are known on soil or dead plant stems. The genus also includes numerous lichenicolous members – around seventy species do not form an independent thallus but instead live parasitically on other lichens. Opegrapha lichens can be found on every continent in suitable habitats, from coastal rock faces to inland forests, wherever their required substrates and microclimates are present. Some species show very specialized distributions; for example, Opegrapha halophila is restricted to marine splash zones on Pacific coastal rocks, while others follow the ranges of their host lichens, potentially occurring wherever the host is found (as seen in lichenicolous species).

== Ecology ==
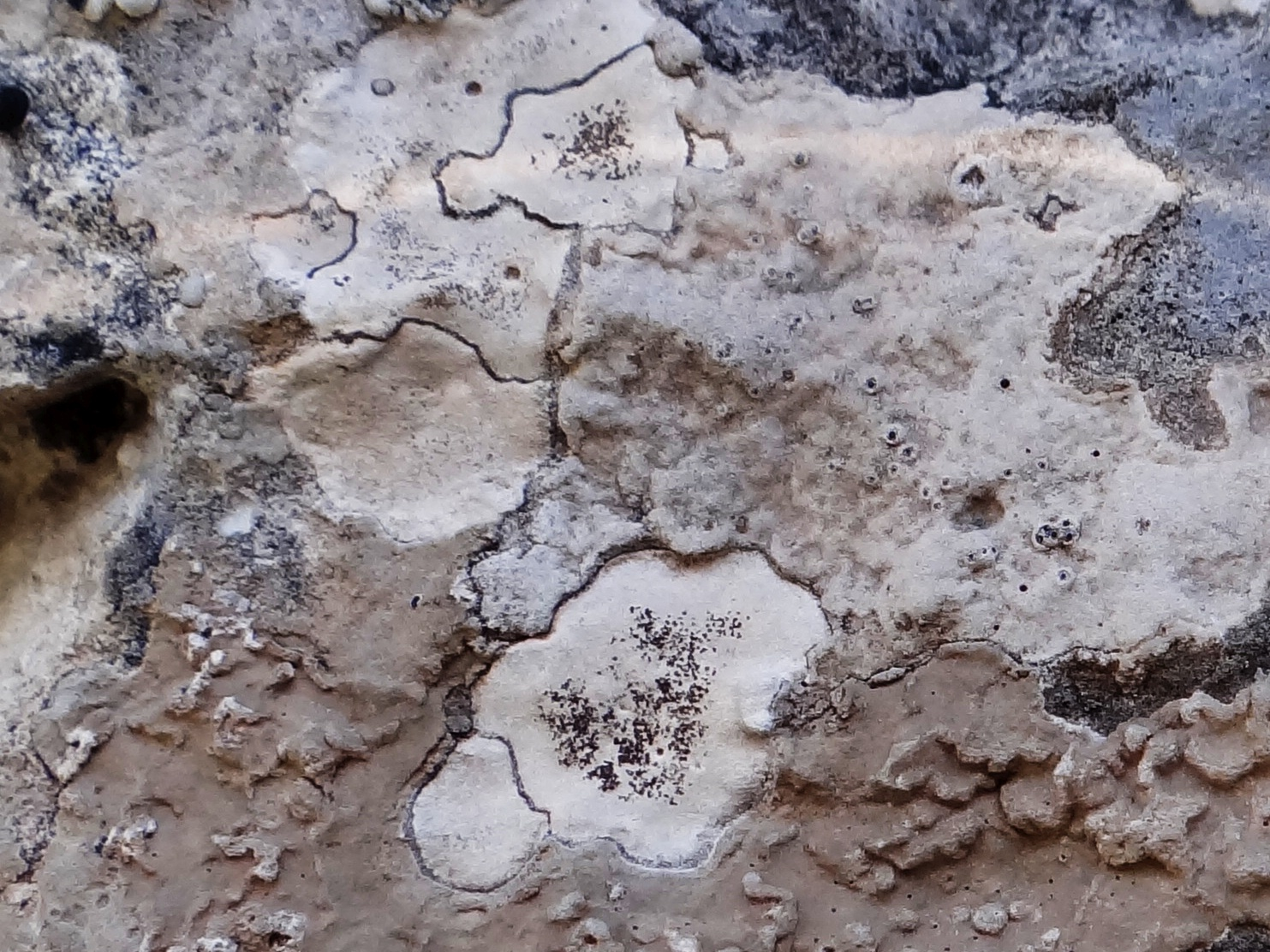
Opegrapha dolomitica on calcareous rock in Poland

Most Opegrapha species are lichenized, partnering with a filamentous green alga as the photobiont. In particular, Trentepohlia is the predominant algal symbiont in this genus, imparting an orange tinge to the lichen and necessitating humid, shaded conditions for optimal growth. Consistent with this, many Opegrapha lichens grow in sheltered, moisture-rich microhabitats such as the understory of old forests or near coastal fog zones. These crustose lichens typically rely on sexual reproduction for dispersal: vegetative propagation is infrequent. Only a minority of species produce powdery soredia (asexual algal-fungal propagules), and when present the soralia remain small and discrete rather than coalescing into large patches.

A substantial fraction of the genus consists of lichenicolous (parasitic) fungi. These Opegrapha species invade other lichens – often those with different photobionts – instead of forming their own visible thallus. Lichenicolous Opegrapha are usually host-specific, each attacking particular host lichen taxa. They grow superficially on the host's surface and develop tiny black lirellae on the infected thallus. In the process, they typically cause localized damage: the parasitized areas of the host become discoloured or necrotic under the Opegrapha colonies. For example, Opegrapha parmeliiperda forms black necrotic patches on Parmelia lichens where its ascocarps develop. Despite this harm to the host's tissues, lichenicolous Opegrapha generally do not kill the entire host organism, and several hosts can persist with long-term, chronic infections. The diversity of Opegrapha's parasitic species is still being uncovered; new lichenicolous species continue to be described. Because many lichenicolous Opegrapha require stable, undisturbed habitats where their host lichens flourish, they can serve as indicators of ecological continuity. In New Brunswick (Canada), for instance, multiple Opegrapha parasites are found only in old-growth swamp forests.

Like most lichens, Opegrapha species are sensitive to environmental conditions. Many members of the genus are absent or sparse in areas with heavy air pollution, especially sulfur dioxide pollution that acidifies bark and rock surfaces. In regions where air quality has improved, Opegrapha lichens have shown a comeback. For example, in Flanders (northern Belgium), observers recorded a resurgence of Opegrapha (and other Trentepohlia-associated lichens) after 2005 as industrial emissions declined. Reduced sulfur air pollution has allowed the bark chemistry of trees to return closer to pre-industrial conditions, enabling these lichens to recolonize areas from which they had long been eliminated. A warming climate has also likely facilitated their spread to higher latitudes and urban settings that were previously less hospitable. Thus, the presence and abundance of Opegrapha in an area can reflect air quality and microclimate stability. Several Opegrapha species once considered rare in northern Europe are now increasingly encountered on city trees and parkland, demonstrating their responsiveness to changing environmental factors.
