= Austroroccella =

Scientific classification
- Kingdom: Fungi
- Division: Ascomycota
- Class: Arthoniomycetes
- Order: Arthoniales
- Family: Roccellaceae
- Genus: Austroroccella; Tehler & Ertz (2013)
- Species: A. gayana

Binomial name
- Austroroccella gayana (Mont.) Tehler & Ertz (2013)

Synonyms
- Roccella gayana Mont. (1852); Roccella tinctoria subsp. gayana (Mont.) Nyl. (1860)

Species of lichen

Austroroccella is a single-species fungal genus in the family Roccellaceae. It contains Austroroccella gayana, a saxicolous (rock-dwelling), fruticose lichen found only in Chile. This lichen produces dark to black discs lacking pruina, and it contains roccellic acid as its only lichen product.

== Taxonomy ==
The genus was circumscribed in 2013 by Anders Tehler and Damien Ertz based on molecular phylogenetic analysis that showed that the species belongs in an isolated clade in the Roccellaceae along with Dendrographa, Syncesia, and Roccellina.

== Description ==
Austroroccella gayana presents as a pendent, bush-like (fruticose) lichen whose cords drape 5–40 cm down seaside rocks. Most branches are cylindrical, but many widen into thin, shovel-shaped blades that give the thallus a pliable, waxy feel. The surface is smooth and never wears the talc-like frost (pruina) that coats related genera; instead it shows sober grey-brown tones that darken toward the branch tips. Chemically the lichen is equally restrained: routine spot tests with potassium hydroxide (K), bleach (C) or para-phenylenediamine (PD) yield no colour change, and thin-layer chromatography detects only roccellic acid, whereas the erythrin and lecanoric acids that are found in many Roccella relatives are entirely absent.

A thin cortex of vertically oriented, brown-tipped hyphae encloses a loose white medulla, while the basal holdfast turns coal-black as the hyphae compact against the rock. The internal partner is the green alga Trentepohlia, whose orange cells form a continuous layer just beneath the cortex. Reproduction is profuse: minute, disc-shaped apothecia stud the older branches in rows, their epruinose black discs bordered by a low collar of the thallus. Each fruit body shelters a 100 μm-thick hymenium threaded with delicate paraphysoids; the asci discharge eight colourless ascospores that are spindle-shaped, divided by three cross-walls, and measure about 28 × 3 μm. Tiny pycnidia, seen as darker pin-pricks in the cortex, release thread-like conidia (12–16 × 1 μm) that provide an auxiliary means of dispersal.

== Habitat and distribution ==
Austroroccella gayana is a narrow Chilean endemic confined to Los Lagos Province, where it clings to sheer, acidic sea-cliffs and other vertical coastal outcrops along a roughly 150 km stretch between Bahía Mansa and Ancud on Isla de Chiloé. Its southern limit near 41° S makes it the most southerly fruticose member of the Roccellaceae; unlike its arid-zone relatives, it prospers in the province's cool, wet oceanic climate, relying on spray-laden air currents that keep competing vegetation sparse.
