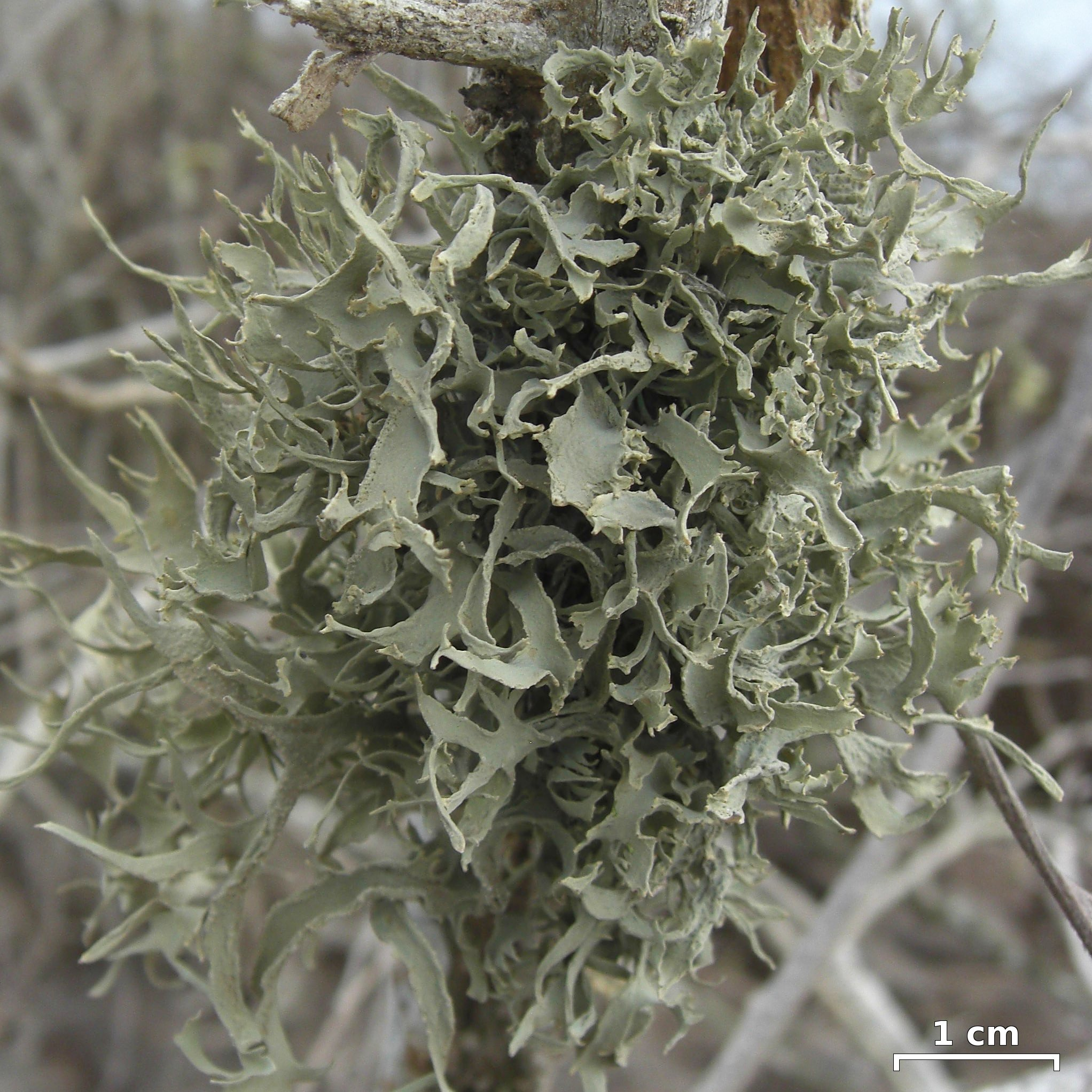
- Roccella gracilis growing on twigs, Santa Fe Island, Galápagos Archipelago

Scientific classification
- Kingdom: Fungi
- Division: Ascomycota
- Class: Arthoniomycetes
- Order: Arthoniales
- Family: Roccellaceae; Chevall. (1826)

Type genus
- Roccella DC. (1805)

Genera
- 48, see text

Synonyms
- Lecanactidaceae Stizenb. (1862); Chiodectonaceae Zahlbr. (1905); Dirinaceae Zahlbr. (1905)

= Roccellaceae =

Family of lichen-forming fungi

The Roccellaceae are a family of mostly lichen-forming fungi in the order Arthoniales, established by the French botanist François Fulgis Chevallier in 1826. Species in the family exhibit various growth forms, including crustose and fruticose (shrub-like) thalli, and diverse reproductive structures. Roccellaceae species typically have disc-like (apotheciate) or slit-like (lirellate) fruiting bodies, often with distinct blackened (carbonised) margins. Molecular phylogenetics studies have revealed considerable genetic diversity and complex evolutionary histories within the family.

Convergent evolution in the Roccellaceae has led to multiple independent developments of similar traits, particularly in growth forms. Molecular studies have divided the family into two main phylogenetic groups, each characterised by distinct internal structures. These findings have prompted major taxonomic revisions, clarifying their evolutionary relationships. Roccellaceae produce lichen substances from different chemical classes, some of which have been historically important as sources of purple or red dyes like orchil.

Roccellaceae species have a nearly worldwide distribution but predominantly inhabit tropical and subtropical regions. Species typically grow on rocks or on tree bark, although some grow on leaves. They form symbiotic relationships with green algae of the genus Trentepohlia, and occupy diverse habitats, especially coastal and near-coastal environments. Five species in the family have been assessed for the IUCN Red List.

== Systematics ==
=== Historical taxonomy ===
The family was circumscribed by the French botanist François Fulgis Chevallier in his 1826 work Flore Générale des Environs de Paris. His original diagnosis included basic morphological characters of the type genus, Roccella: "Apothecia shield-like, stalked or embedded in the thallus, with a coloured disc that is cartilaginous (firm and somewhat flexible), initially concave and eventually becoming flat and margined, with a thin margin. Thallus erect or pendulous (hanging), branched, tufted, cartilaginous-homogeneous (uniformly firm and somewhat flexible), and in many cases compressed". Chevallier included the genus Roccella in the family, which was erected in 1805 by the Swiss botanist Augustin Pyramus de Candolle with Roccella fuciformis as the type species.

Three genera in the Roccellaceae were previously placed in distinct families. These are the Lecanactidaceae for genus Lecanactis (Ernst Stizenberger, 1862); the Chiodectonaceae for genus Chiodecton (Alexander Zahlbruckner, 1905); and Dirinaceae for genus Dirina (Zahlbruckner, 1905). These families have since been synonymised with Roccellaceae.

=== Etymology ===
Following standard practice in botanical nomenclature, the name Roccellaceae is derived from the type genus Roccella, with the suffix -aceae denoting its rank as a family. The genus name Roccella probably originates from the Italian word roccella, a common name for lichens, itself derived from the Latin rocca (meaning 'rock') with the diminutive suffix -ella.

=== Classification ===
- Arthoniales
  - Andreiomycetaceae
  - Chrysotrichaceae
  - - - - Roccellaceae
        - Opegraphaceae
      - Roccellographaceae
    - Lecanographaceae
    - Arthoniaceae

Cladogram of the Arthoniales, showing the division of Arthoniales into seven families, based on Hodkinson and Lendemer's 2013 analysis.

Roccellaceae is the largest family in the order Arthoniales by number of genera. Its status as a distinct family was firmly established by genetic evidence, first demonstrated in a large-scale phylogenetic study by Damien Ertz and Anders Tehler in 2011. This study distinguished Roccellaceae from Opegraphaceae and laid the groundwork for further research. Additional molecular phylogenetic studies have since reinforced its position as a separate family within the order.

The family is part of one of the three major evolutionary lines identified within Arthoniales, specifically the lineage that includes Lecanographaceae, Opegraphaceae, Roccellaceae, and Roccellographaceae. These four families are consistently grouped together in phylogenetic analyses, suggesting they are closely related. However, the exact relationships among these families are not fully resolved, partly because the deeper branches within the Roccellaceae (the basal nodes) tree lack strong evidence, making the connections uncertain. This phylogenetic uncertainty may explain some differences in tree structure among various studies.

Within Roccellaceae in the strict sense, Ertz and Tehler identified five main lineages: the sister pair Dirina and Roccella; Chiodecton natalense and Lecanactis (grouped together but not identified as a sister pair); Roccellina; Syncesia; and Dendrographa. Roccellaceae was the only family in their analysis to include large genera that had been thoroughly sequenced, such as Roccella and Roccellina.

Roccellaceae is distinct from Arthoniaceae, the largest family in the order. This distinction is supported by both genetic and morphological differences, particularly in ascus type. Roccellaceae typically have cylindrical asci, whereas Arthoniaceae have more or less spherical (globose) to club-shaped (clavate) asci. Some synapomorphies for Roccellaceae include the reduction of the proper exciple, the protective layer around the hymenium, (with a reversal in Lecanactis) and the loss of the gelatinous sheath surrounding ascospores. These characteristics are significant because they provide morphological support for the family's monophyly, complementing the molecular data. The reduction of the proper exciple suggests a shared evolutionary trend within the family, possibly related to environmental adaptations or reproductive strategies. The absence of a gelatinous sheath around ascospores, a feature often associated with spore dispersal and protection, indicates a unique developmental pathway in Roccellaceae compared to related families. The reversal of the reduced exciple in Lecanactis demonstrates that even synapomorphies can exhibit exceptions within a monophyletic group.

Some genera previously assigned to Roccellaceae, such as Enterographa and Erythrodecton, have been shown to belong to a separate, well-supported clade distinct from Roccellaceae. This was first suggested by Ertz and Tehler in 2011 and later confirmed by subsequent studies. While Roccellaceae includes a diverse range of species, no former members of the genus Arthonia are currently classified within it. This taxonomic separation aligns with morphological and genetic distinctions between the families.

=== Molecular phylogenetics ===
Phylogenetic studies of Roccellaceae have made substantial progress in recent decades. Early work in the 1990s used cladistic methods based on morphological and chemical characteristics. Tehler's 1990 study was among the first to apply cladistic analysis to relationships within Arthoniales and Roccellaceae, using type species of genera as the end points of the evolutionary tree. This early work supported the monophyly of Roccellaceae within Arthoniales, based on synapomorphies such as cortex plectenchyma. It also highlighted the ecological association of many Roccellaceae species with coastal habitats and suggested multiple origins of the fruticose (shrub-like) habit within the family, with reversals to crustose forms in some lineages.

Molecular phylogenetic studies of Roccellaceae began in the late 1990s, with early work utilising both internal transcribed spacer (ITS) and small subunit ribosomal DNA (SSU rDNA) sequences. These initial studies revealed that fruticose and crustose growth forms had evolved multiple times within the family. They also suggested a broader circumscription of Roccellaceae, incorporating genera previously assigned to other families such as Lecanactis, Schismatomma, and Syncesia. However, these studies also highlighted challenges in molecular analysis of the family, particularly in aligning the highly variable ITS regions. The usefulness of ITS sequences was found to vary among genera, proving more informative for some (e.g., Roccella, Dendrographa) than others (e.g., Roccellina, Dirina).

- Roccellaceae
  - - Mazosia
    - - - Erythrodecton
        - Dichosporidium
      - Enterographa
  - - - Sigridea
      - - Gyrographa
        - - Psoronactis
          - - Austroroccella
            - - - - Isalonactis
                  - - Sagenidiopsis
                    - Chiodecton
                  - Lecanactis
                - ‘Schismatomma’ cf. umbrinum
              - - Schismatomma
                - - - Diromma
                    - - Dirina
                      - Roccella
                  - - - Pseudoschismatomma
                      - Ocellomma
                    - - Gyronactis
                      - - - Crocellina
                          - Vigneronia
                        - Roccellina
                      - - Dendrographa
                        - Syncesia

Cladogram showing the phylogeny of some genera in family Roccellaceae; based on analysis by Ertz et al. in 2014 (simplified from original). Single quote marks around a taxon name means that the species is likely misclassified.

Building on these early findings, more recent molecular studies, particularly those using nuclear large subunit ribosomal RNA (LSU) and RNA polymerase II second largest subunit (RPB2) gene sequences, have provided insights into the phylogenetic relationships within Roccellaceae. These studies have revealed that the family is divided into two main clades, each with distinct characteristics. The first clade, the "pale hypothecium clade", includes genera such as Llimonea, Combea, Pentagenella, Hubbsia, and Ingaderia. This group is characterised by species with pale-coloured hypothecia and has a range of growth forms from crustose to fruticose.

The second major clade, known as the "carbonaceous hypothecium clade", encompasses genera such as Roccella, Dirina, Roccellina, Lecanactis, Schismatomma, Dendrographa, and Syncesia. Species in this group are distinguished by their black, carbonaceous hypothecia. Like the first clade, this group also displays a variety of growth forms from crustose to fruticose. The carbonaceous hypothecium clade further divides into two groups: the Dirina-Roccella subgroup and the Lecanactis-Schismatomma-Dendrographa-Syncesia-Roccellina subgroup.

A 2014 study, based on analyses of 341 sequences representing about 114 species, has further refined the understanding of these relationships. The genus Cresponea was identified as possibly sister to the rest of the Roccellaceae. The first major clade was expanded to include genera such as Dichosporidium, Enterographa, Erythrodecton, and Mazosia, in addition to Cresponea. In the second major clade, Sigridea californica was resolved as sister to the rest of the group, with the genera Gyrographa and Psoronactis forming a well-supported group near the base of this clade.

These phylogenetic findings have important implications for understanding the evolution of morphological traits within the family, particularly the development of different growth forms. The research has shown that the fruticose growth form has evolved independently multiple times within the family. This convergent evolution is particularly evident in the genus Roccellina, where the fruticose form has appeared several times.

The molecular data have also led to major taxonomic revisions within the family. Several species previously classified in other genera, particularly Opegrapha, have been transferred to Roccellaceae based on these analyses. Additionally, some genera have been shown to be polyphyletic (derived from more than one evolutionary ancestor), leading to the description of new genera to accommodate distinct lineages.

== Evolution of growth forms ==
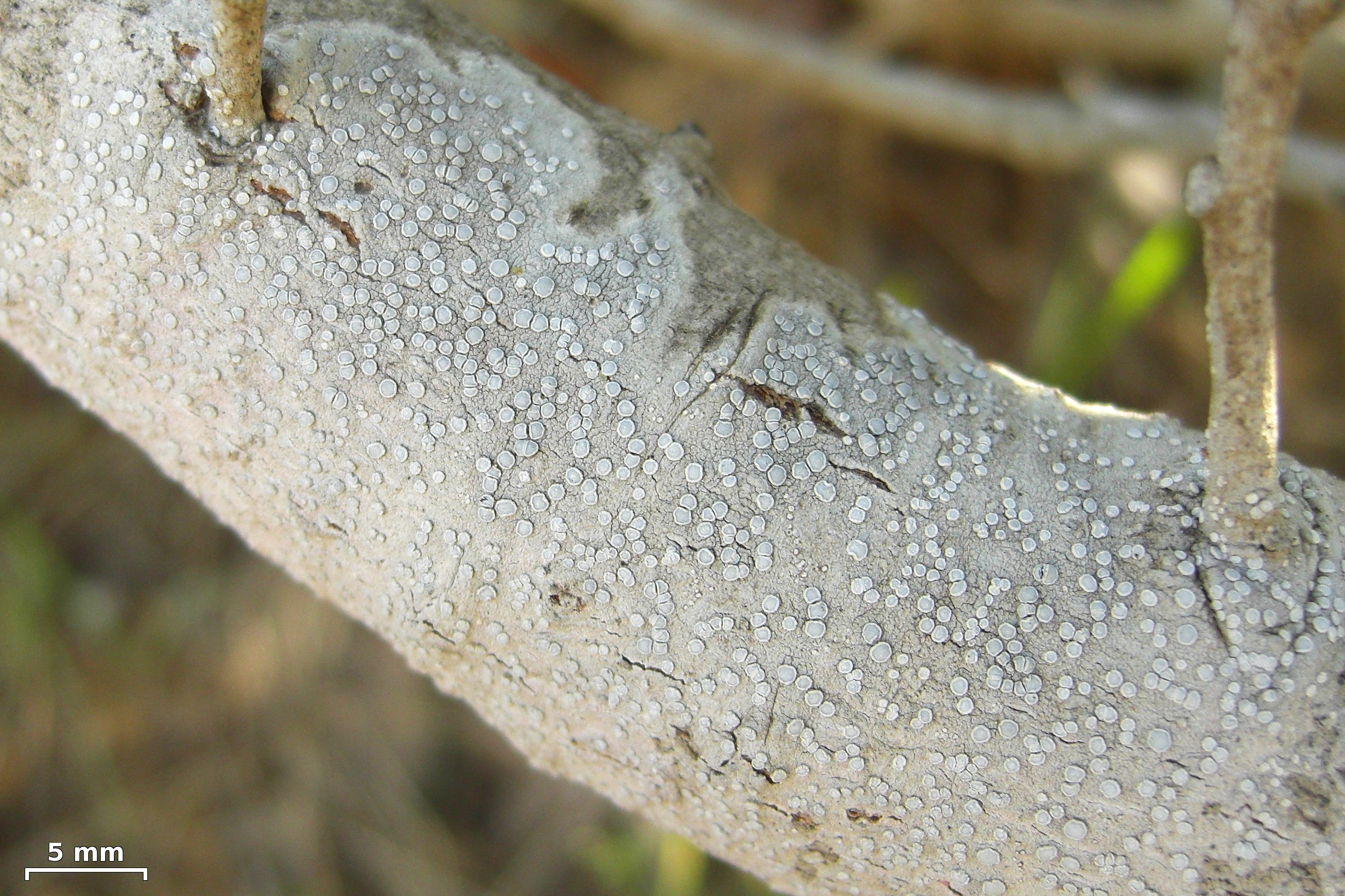
Sigridea californica is a crustose member of the Roccellaceae.

The evolution of growth forms within the Roccellaceae exemplifies convergent evolution. Molecular studies show that the fruticose growth form has evolved independently multiple times within the family. This phenomenon is particularly evident in the genus Roccellina, where the fruticose form has emerged at least three separate times from crustose ancestors. Similarly, the small genus Pentagenella shows evidence of both evolving the fruticose form and reverting to a crustose state. These repeated evolutions challenge the use of growth form as a primary characteristic for classification and highlight the adaptability of these lichens to various environments, suggesting that the fruticose form offers specific habitat advantages.

Other research further illuminates the evolution of other morphological characters within the family. For instance, the carbonaceous (blacked and charcoal-like) excipulum, a feature traditionally used to define certain genera, has a complex evolutionary history. Some species now placed in Roccellaceae based on molecular data possess a carbonaceous excipulum, despite it not being typical of the family. This suggests multiple gains or losses of this feature throughout the evolution of Roccellaceae.

The evolution of ascomata types also shows distinct patterns within the family. While many Roccellaceae have apotheciate (disc-like) or lirelliform (slit-like) ascomata, some genera, such as Chiodecton, have evolved perithecioid (flask-shaped with an opening through which spores are released) ascomata aggregated into stroma-like structures. This diversity indicates multiple evolutionary transitions in reproductive structures within the family. Additionally, the evolution of chemical characters is taxonomically significant in some lineages. For example, the presence of specific lichen substances, such as psoromic acid in Psoronactis, distinguishes some newly recognised genera within Roccellaceae.

== Description ==
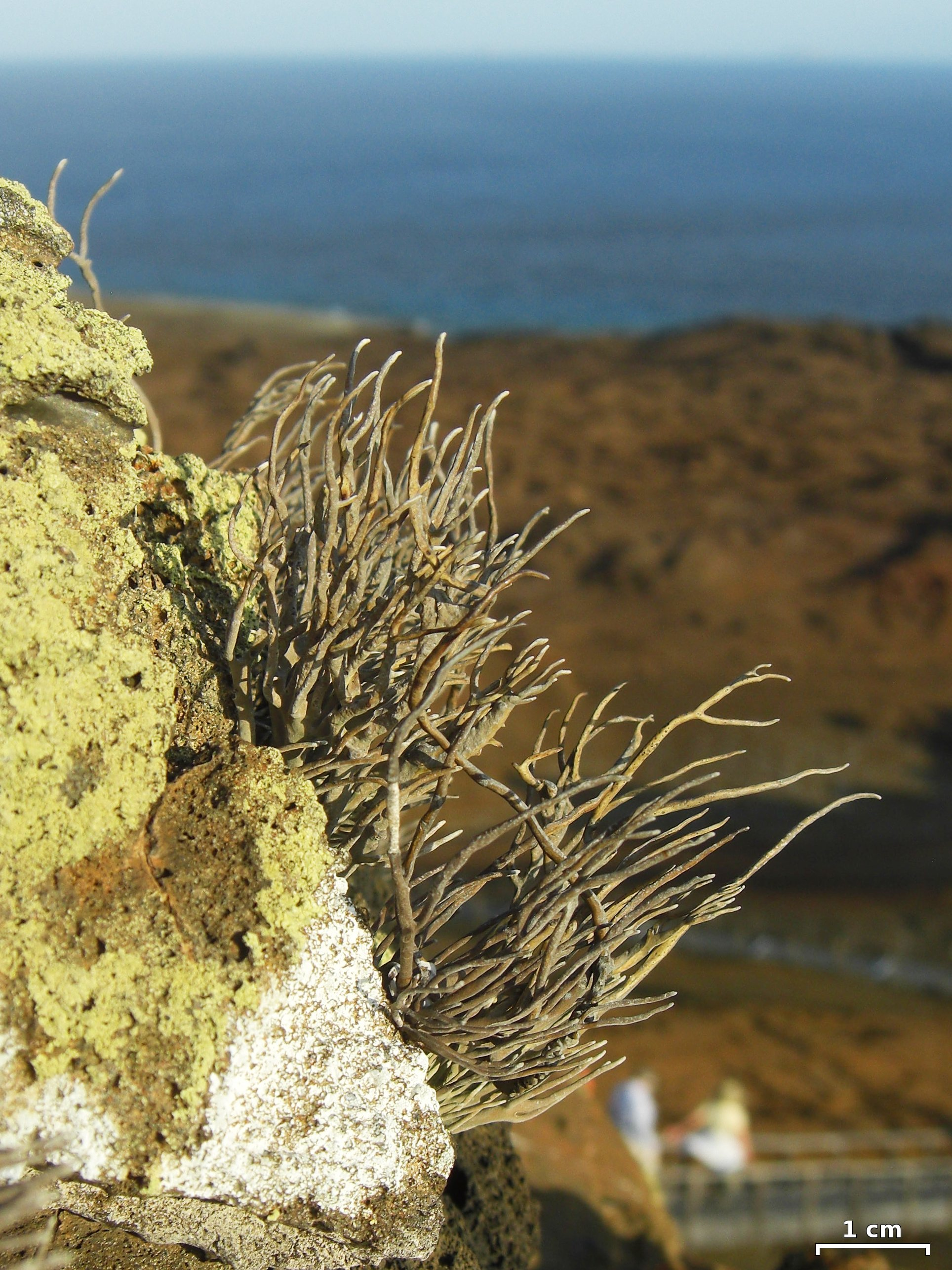
Roccella galapagoensis is a fruticose member of the Roccelaceae.

Roccellaceae species have thalli (the main body of the lichen) ranging in form from crust-lie (crustose) to bush-like (fruticose). Crustose forms are often also byssoid (wispy, like teased wool). The ascomata (spore-producing structures) are typically apotheciate (open, disc-like) or lirellate (elongated, slit-like). More rarely, they are stromatic and appear perithecioid (flask-shaped). Ascomata usually have distinct, mostly carbonised (blackened) proper margins and often a thalline margin (formed from the thallus itself).

The hamathecium (tissue between spore-producing structures) consists of branched and anastomosing (interconnected) paraphyses (sterile filaments). These are hemiamyloid (partially reacting with iodine staining) or amyloid (fully reacting with iodine).

Asci (spore sacs) in Roccellaceae are fissitunicate, in which spore discharge involves separation of wall layers. The asci have an apical tholus (thickened inner apex) and narrow ocular chamber (small space at the tip), often with an amyloid ring-structure. Asci are clavate (club-shaped).

Ascospores typically number eight per ascus, sometimes reduced to 2–4. They are transversely septate (rarely muriform), fusiform to oblong-ellipsoid, euseptate with rectangular lumina. Spores often have slightly thickened walls and an enlarged upper median cell. They are usually hyaline (translucent and colourless), rarely brown, and non-amyloid.

Conidiomata (asexual spore-producing structures) are pycnidia (flask-shaped). Conidia (asexual spores) are non-septate to transversely septate, varying in shape from oblong to bacillar, acicular-filiform, or falcate. They are hyaline.

== Photobiont ==
Members of the Roccellaceae typically associate with trentepohlialean algae as photobionts. A study of these algae found that photobionts of Roccella species from various European locations, including Spain's Canary Islands and Portugal, form a distinct phylogenetic lineage within a larger group of Trentepohliaceae. This lineage is closely related to photobionts found in Lecanographa amylacea from Sweden. Additionally, photobionts of Syncesia farinacea, another Roccellaceae member from Bolivia, were found to be closely related to those of Roccella species. These Roccellaceae-associated photobionts are part of a diverse clade that includes both free-living and lichenised trentepohlialean algae from various parts of the world, suggesting a complex evolutionary history in the family's symbiotic relationships.

Research has revealed an unexpected level of photobiont flexibility within the family. Lecanographa amylacea has been found to associate with two very different types of photobionts: Trebouxia (a genus of green algae in the class Trebouxiophyceae) and trentepohlioid algae (in the class Ulvophyceae). This is the first reported case of a lichen species that can switch between these two distinct photobiont types. The choice of photobiont leads to radical morphological differences in the lichen thallus, with the Trebouxia-associated form previously recognised as a separate species, "Buellia violaceofusca". The Trebouxia photobionts found in this sorediate morphotype belong to at least three different phylogenetic clades, and L. amylacea appears able to "capture" Trebouxia photobionts from other lichens like Chrysothrix candelaris. Meanwhile, its trentepohlioid photobiont is closely related to Trentepohlia strains isolated from Roccella species. This photobiont flexibility allows L. amylacea to use a wider range of tree hosts and potentially expand its ecological niche and distribution.

== Chemistry ==
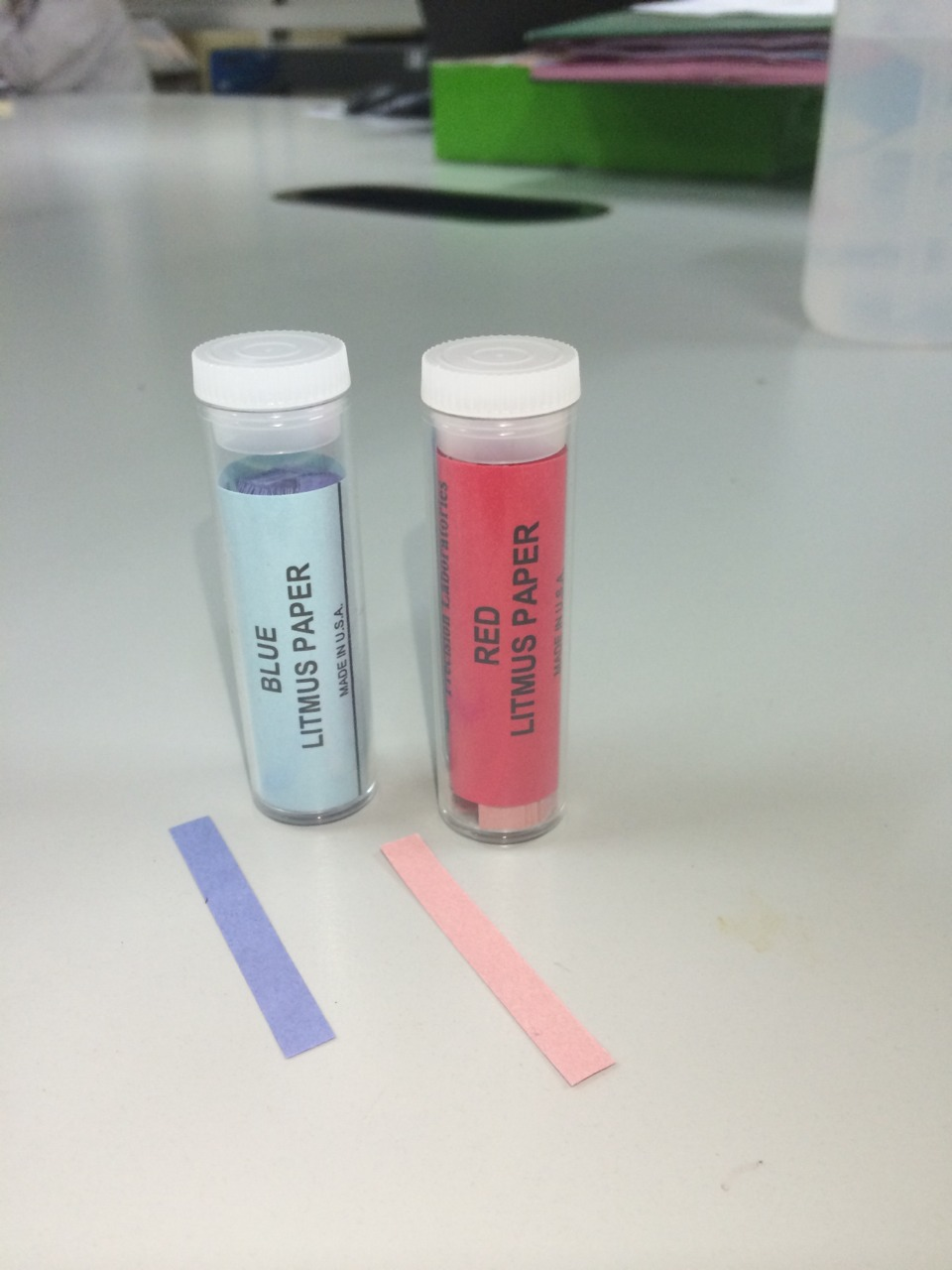
Litmus paper is made from dyes obtained from several lichens, including some Rocella species.

The chemistry of Roccellaceae is characterised by the presence of various lichen substances important to their biology and historical significance. Many species in the family, particularly in the genus Roccella, contain depsides such as lecanoric acid and erythrin. Other type of chemicals commonly found in the family are depsidones, dibenzofurans, and anthraquinones. These compounds were historically important as the source of orchil, a purple or red dye that has been used since ancient times. The presence and distribution of these substances can vary among and within species. For instance, Roccella hypomecha exhibits chemical variability, with some individuals producing a dotty red medulla C+ (red) spot test reaction, while others show no reaction (C−). In Pentagenella fragillima, erythrin and protocetraric acid have been identified. The chemistry can also be important for species identification. In the Roccella montagnei complex, the lack of reaction of soredia to chlorine (C−) is a distinguishing feature. Some species, like Roccella boryi, show a C+ (red) reaction in the thallus but not in the soralia. The presence of psoromic acid has been noted in Pentagenella corallina. The substance roccellic acid is produced by many species of the Roccellaceae; this long-chain fatty acid is otherwise nearly absent in the other families of Arthoniales. Roccella phycopsis (historically known as Roccella tinctoria) is a common source for litmus, a mixture of dyes extracted from lichens, and the basis of a common pH indicator test.

== Habitat, distribution, and ecology ==
Roccellaceae has an almost cosmopolitan distribution, although the majority of species occur in the tropics and in semi-arid subtropical areas. The family shows distinct biogeographical patterns, with certain genera preferring specific hemispheres. Historically, Roccellina was thought to be predominantly Southern Hemisphere, with only 3 of its 31 species in the Northern Hemisphere. However, recent studies have refined the understanding of the family's biogeography. Roccellina has been shown to be restricted entirely to the Southern Hemisphere. The species formerly known as Roccellina cinerea, endemic to Socotra Island, has been reclassified into a new genus, Crocellina. Similarly, Roccellina nipponica, known only from Asia (Japan, Taiwan), has been found to be nested within the Dendrographa decolorans clade.

Conversely, Roccella and Dirina are mostly Northern Hemisphere genera. Roccella boryi is the only Roccella species restricted to the Southern Hemisphere, found on Mauritius. Roccella montagnei is found on both sides of the equator around the Indian Ocean, including northern Australia. Dirina paradoxa ssp. africana is also found in the Southern Hemisphere on Mauritius. Notably, some Galapagos Roccellaceae species, such as Roccella galapagoensis and R. lirellina, are more related to North American and Caribbean species than to those in South America, suggesting a complex evolutionary history influenced by continental movements and long-distance dispersal.

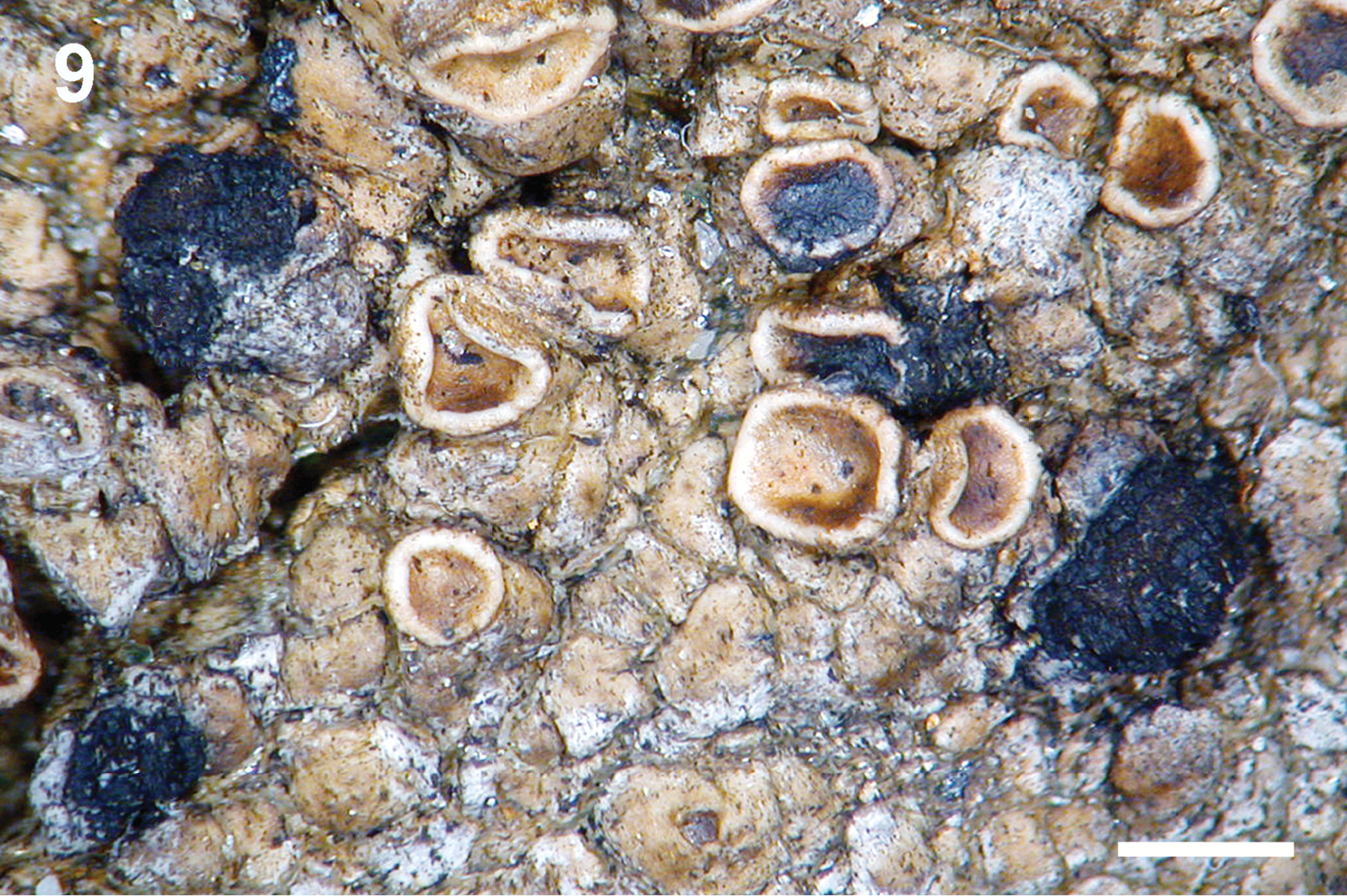
Phacographa protoparmeliae (blackened areas), shown here parasitising the thallus of the crustose lichen Protoparmelia badia (family Parmeliaceae), is a member of the genus Phacographa, which exclusively grows on lichen.

Roccellaceae species occupy diverse habitats, primarily coastal and near-coastal. Many species prefer rocky substrates, especially cliffs and boulders near the sea. Roccella fuciformis is found on rocks along the western Mediterranean and Atlantic coasts from Morocco to England, while Roccella phycopsis inhabits rocks and cliffs in Macaronesia and the western Mediterranean. Some species are more flexible; Roccella montagnei grows on trees, shrubs, and rocks, while Roccellina mollis is typically found on rocks but can also grow on branches, twigs, and cactus spines in Chile and Peru. Several species prefer tree bark; for example, Schismatomma pericleum grows on Quercus and Picea bark in Europe and North America. In tropical and subtropical regions, species like Syncesia farinacea colonise tree bark and shrub bark near the sea. Some species, such as Pentagenella fragillima, adapt to extreme environments like the Chilean coast, growing on vertical, south-exposed rock and cliff faces. In contrast, most species in genus Mazosia are foliicolous (leaf-dwellers).

The distribution of some species has been expanded by recent discoveries. Roccellina leptothalla, once thought to be restricted to South America (Brazil), is now also found in the Northern Hemisphere in the Antilles (Martinique and Guadeloupe). Roccellaceae includes several genera that host lichenicolous (lichen-dwelling) fungi. About a dozen species of lichenicolous fungi are reported within this family, distributed across five genera. Enterographa has the highest diversity of lichenicolous fungi in the family, with nine obligately lichenicolous species and one facultatively or doubtfully lichenicolous species, out of a total of 55 total species in the genus. Mazosia, Schismatomma and Sigridea each have one lichenicolous fungus species.

== Conservation ==
The conservation status of five Roccellaceae species has been assessed for the global IUCN Red List. All five species are native to Colombia and face various threats to their survival.

Schismatomma leucopsarum (Critically Endangered, 2023) is known from only a single location in the municipality of Honda, Cundinamarca Department. It is threatened by deforestation for timber extraction and expansion of industrial areas. Despite surveys in similar habitats, the species has not been rediscovered since its initial collection.

Lecanactis proximans (Critically Endangered, 2023) is known from a single location in the Cerros Orientales (Eastern Hills) of Bogotá. It is threatened by habitat alteration and deforestation due to urban expansion, industrial development, and agricultural encroachment. The species has not been rediscovered in surveys of remnant forest patches in the area.

Ancistrosporella leucophila (Critically Endangered, 2023) is known from a single location in the municipality of Piedecuesta, Santander Department. It is threatened by land-use changes for recreational areas and deforestation. The species has not been recorded in recent inventories.

Chiodecton inconspicuum (Data Deficient, 2023) is associated with the Magdalena River, but there is insufficient information about its population, habitat, ecology, and potential threats to assess its conservation status.

Chiodecton subordinatum (Data Deficient, 2023) is known from dry enclaves in Santander Department, but there is insufficient information about its population, habitat, ecology, and potential threats to assess its conservation status. Additionally, its taxonomic affinity with the modern concept of the genus Chiodecton is unclear, requiring further taxonomic revision.

All five species are protected under Colombian Resolution 0213 of 1977, issued by the Ministry of Environment and Sustainable Development, which prohibits their use and commercialisation. Conservation recommendations for these species include further research on their life history, ecology, and potential additional locations, as well as habitat protection and public awareness campaigns.

In China, where of 2,164 lichen species evaluated for inclusion on its red list, only 23 were members of the Roccellaceae; 3 of those were listed as least-concern species, and the other 20 as data deficient.

== Genera ==
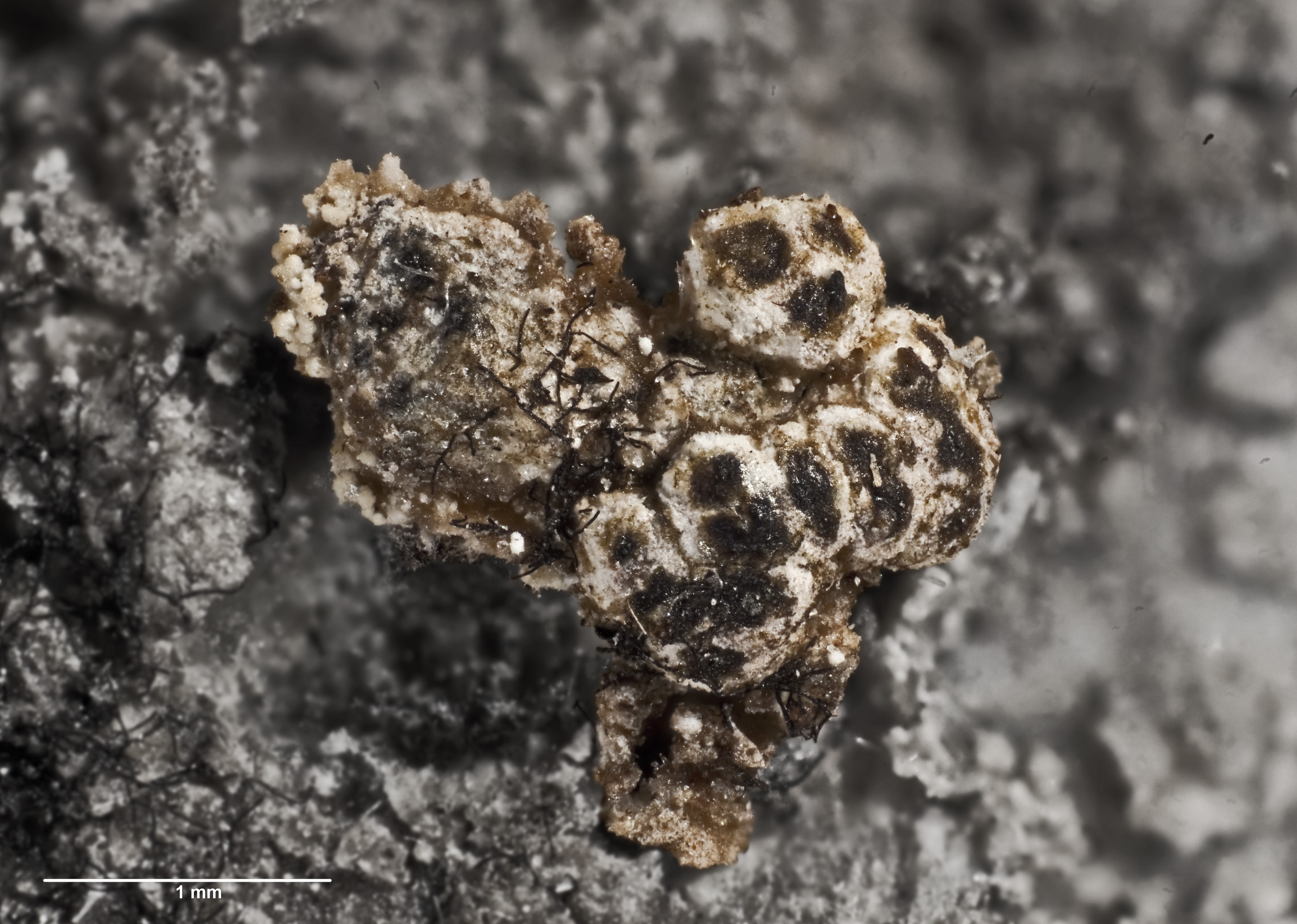
Chiodecton montanum

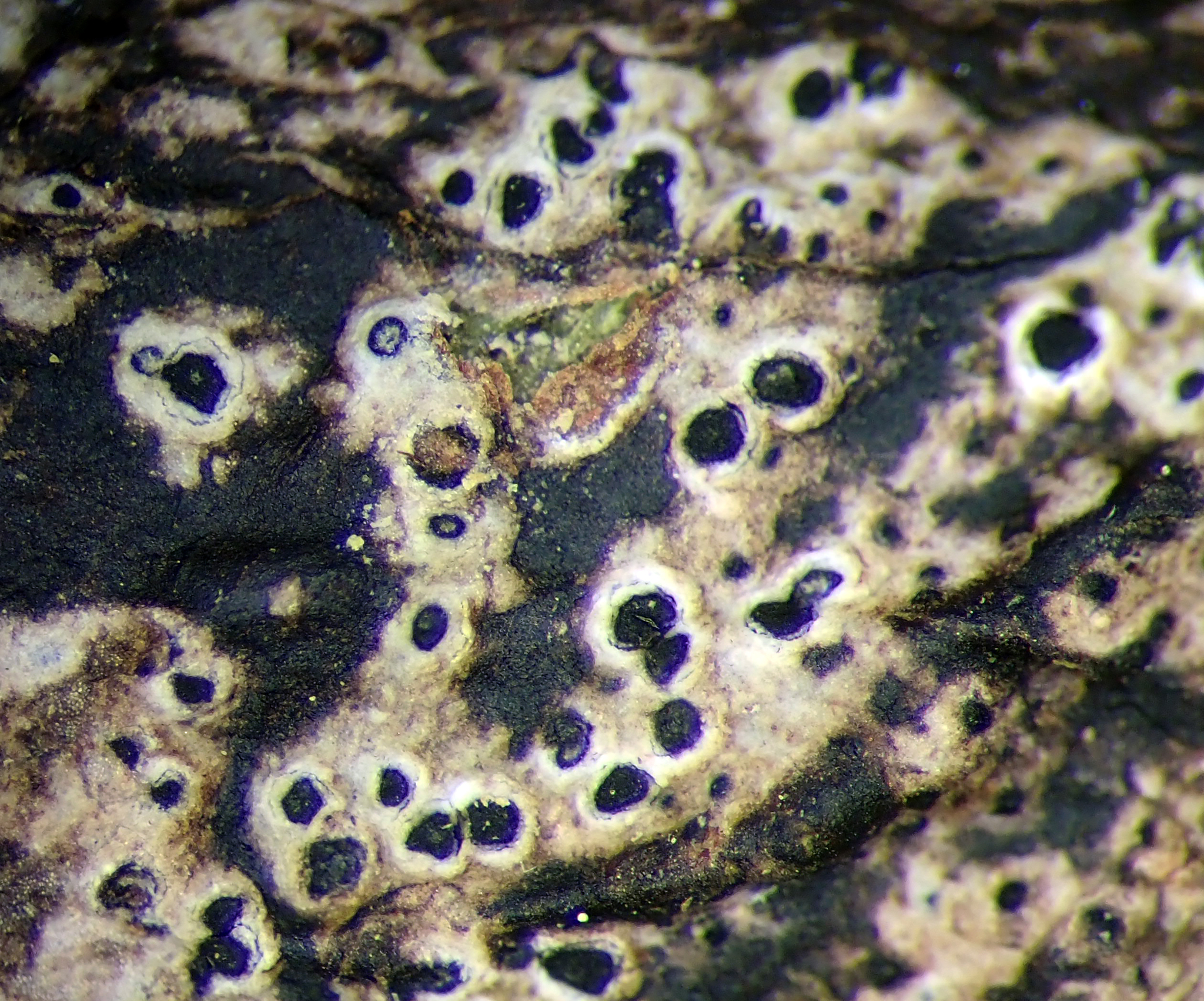
Mazosia phyllosema

As of 2016, the Roccellaceae was the 20th-largest among the 115 fungal families that contain lichen-formers. As of September 2024, Species Fungorum (in the Catalogue of Life) accepts 48 genera and 287 species in Roccellaceae. The largest is Enterographa, with 66 species. Eighteen genera are monotypic, containing a single species.

- Ancistrosporella G.Thor (1995) – 6 spp.
- Austrographa Sparrius, Elix & A.W.Archer (2013) – 3 spp.
- Austroroccella Tehler & Ertz (2013) – 1 sp.
- Baidera Ertz & Diederich (2020) – 1 sp.
- Chiodecton Ach. (1814) – 24 spp.
- Crocellina Tehler & Ertz (2014) – 1 sp.
- Dendrographa Darb. (1895) – 7 spp.
- Dichosporidium Pat. (1903) – 8 spp.
- Diplogramma Müll.Arg. (1891) – 1 spp.
- Dirina Fr. (1825) – 13 spp.
- Dirinastrum Müll.Arg. (1893) – 2 spp.
- Diromma Ertz & Tehler (2014) – 1 sp.
- Enterodictyon Müll.Arg. (1892) – 3 spp.
- Enterographa Fée (1825) – 66 spp.
- Erythrodecton G.Thor (1991) – 3 spp.
- Feigeana Mies, Lumbsch & Tehler (1995) – 1 sp.
- Follmanniella Peine & Werner (1995) – 1 sp.
- Gorgadesia Tav. (1964) – 1 sp.
- Graphidastra (Redinger) G.Thor (1991) – 4 spp.
- Gyrographa Ertz & Tehler (2014) – 3 spp.
- Gyronactis Ertz & Tehler (2014) – 2 spp.
- Halographis Kohlm. & Volkm.-Kohlm. (1988) – 1 sp.
- Haplodina Zahlbr. (1930) – 3 spp.
- Isalonactis Ertz, Tehler, Eb.Fisch., Killmann, Razafindr. & Sérus. (2014) – 1 sp.
- Lecanactis Körb. (1855) – ca. 30 spp.
- Mazosia A.Massal. (1854) – 27 spp.
- Neosergipea M.Cáceres, Ertz & Aptroot (2016) – 4 spp.
- Ocellomma Ertz & Tehler (2014) – 1 sp.
- Paralecanographa Ertz & Tehler (2011) – 1 sp.
- Phacographa Hafellner (2009) – 3 spp.
- Protoroccella Follmann ex Follmann (2001) – 2 spp.
- Pseudolecanactis Zahlbr. (1907) – 1 sp.
- Pseudoschismatomma Ertz & Tehler (2014) – 1 sp.
- Psoronactis Ertz & Tehler (2014) – 1 sp.
- Pulvinodecton Henssen & G.Thor (1998) – 2 spp.
- Roccella DC. (1805) – 32 spp.
- Roccellina Darb. (1898) – 15 spp.
- Roccellodea Darb. (1932) – 1 sp.
- Sagenidiopsis R.W.Rogers & Hafellner (1987) – 4 spp.
- Schismatomma Flot. & Körb. ex A.Massal. (1852) – 10 spp.
- Sigridea Tehler (1993) – 6 spp.
- Simonyella J.Steiner (1902) – 1 sp.
- Sipmania Egea & Torrente (1993) – 1 sp.
- Sporhaplus H.B.P.Upadhyay (1964) – 1 sp.
- Streimannia G.Thor (1991) – 1 sp.
- Syncesia Taylor (1836) – ca. 25 spp.
- Tania Egea, Torrente & Sipman (1995) – 2 spp.
- Vigneronia Ertz (2014) – 5 spp.
