= Gyrographa =

Scientific classification
- Kingdom: Fungi
- Division: Ascomycota
- Class: Arthoniomycetes
- Order: Arthoniales
- Family: Roccellaceae
- Genus: Gyrographa; Ertz & Tehler (2014)

Type species
- Gyrographa gyrocarpa (Flot.) Ertz & Tehler 2014

Species
- G. fecunda G. gyrocarpa G. nigrofusca G. saxigena

Genus of lichens

Gyrographa is a genus of lichen-forming fungi in the family Roccellaceae. The genus was circumscribed in 2014 by Damien Ernst and Anders Tehler, with Gyrographa gyrocarpa assigned as the type species. This lichen, originally described by Julius von Flotow in 1825, was first placed in the genus Opegrapha. Species in the genus have a crustose thallus lacking a cortex, and a dark brown prothallus. The photobiont partner is trentepholioid. The hypothecium is thick and carbonised, and the ascospores lack a gelatinous sheath; these characteristics distinguish it from Opegrapha species. The genus name alludes to the gyrose ascomata of the type species.

== Taxonomy ==
Gyrographa was erected in 2014 by Damien Ertz and Anders Tehler during a broad two-locus revision of the Roccellaceae that sought to bring the family's genera into line with molecular phylogeny. DNA sequences from the nuclear large-subunit ribosomal RNA and RPB2 genes showed that several erstwhile Opegrapha species actually form three separate lineages inside the Roccellaceae; to keep each lineage monophyletic the authors described the new genera Gyrographa, Vigneronia, and Pseudoschismatomma. Within the family tree Gyrographa groups tightly with Psoronactis and is separated from other roccellacean clades by branches that enjoy maximal statistical support. This placement confirms that the genus belongs to the order Arthoniales, class Arthoniomycetes, rather than the Opegraphaceae where its species had long been listed on morphological grounds.

The circumscription initially encompassed two saxicolous lichens: the type species G. gyrocarpa and G. saxigena. They were transferred from Opegrapha because they combine three traits that are uncommon elsewhere in the Roccellaceae—black knot-like or short lirellate ascomata with a thick carbonised hypothecium, a persistent black margin, and colourless three-septate spores that lack the gelatinous envelope typical of most Opegrapha species. The generic name refers to the faintly wrinkled (gyrose) outline of the fruit bodies in the type collection. Subsequent collections and sequence data have upheld the genus as a coherent, well-supported lineage within the Roccellaceae, providing a clear framework for recognising any additional species that share its distinctive combination of DNA signature and morphological characters.

== Description ==
The thallus forms a crust that is tightly bonded to its substrate (crustose) and lacks a true protective skin (non-corticate). It ranges in colour from grey-cream through dark or purplish brown and can appear faintly pink when freshly collected. Although it may reach up to 2 mm thick, it is usually much thinner. Powdery reproductive patches (soralia) are sometimes present; these begin as discrete round spots 0.3–1.5 mm across but soon merge into broad dull yellow-grey to pinkish swathes, the pink tinge fading in the herbarium. A dark-brown fibrous prothallus often fringes the thallus, and the photosynthetic partner is a filamentous orange alga of the genus Trentepohlia.

The fruit bodies (ascomata) of Gyrographa are usually sessile, appearing either knot-like clusters with a wrinkled (gyrose) outline or short slit-shaped lirellae. They are black, never dusted with a pale bloom, and keep a conspicuous black margin even when the disc is narrowly exposed. The rim (excipulum) is dark brown and turns olive with potassium hydroxide (K+ olivaceous), while the tissue beneath the spore layer (hypothecium) is exceptionally thick and jet-black (carbonised). The spore-bearing layer (hymenium) yields a reddish staining reaction with iodine (I+ red). Inside, slender, branched filaments (paraphysoids) weave between 8-spored, club-shaped asci. Spores are colourless, 3-septate, 15–25 × 4–6 μm, straight, and lack the gelatinous envelope seen in many relatives. Minute flask-like pycnidia generate rod-shaped conidia measuring 4–7 × 0.3–0.8 μm. Standard spot tests show the thallus either unreactive (C−) or briefly red with bleach (C+), K−, and KC+ (red); thin-layer chromatography detects gyrophoric and/or schizopeltic acids, though some specimens contain no secondary metabolites. These combined traits—especially the carbonised hypothecium and unsheathed spores—separate Gyrographa from superficially similar former Opegrapha species.

== Species ==
As of June 2025, Species Fungorum (via the Catalogue of Life) accepts four species of Gyrographa:

- Gyrographa fecunda P.M.McCarthy (2022) – Australia
- Gyrographa gyrocarpa (Flot.) Ertz & Tehler (2014)
- Gyrographa nigrofusca Jagad. Ram (2016) – India
- Gyrographa saxigena (Taylor) Ertz & Tehler (2014)
