= Crocellina =

Scientific classification
- Domain: Eukaryota
- Kingdom: Fungi
- Division: Ascomycota
- Class: Arthoniomycetes
- Order: Arthoniales
- Family: Roccellaceae
- Genus: Crocellina; Tehler & Ertz (2014)
- Species: C. cinerea

Binomial name
- Crocellina cinerea (Müll.Arg.) Tehler & Ertz 2014

Synonyms
- Dirina cinerea Müll.Arg. (1882); Dirina cinerea f. sorediosa Müll.Arg. (1882); Roccellina cinerea (Müll.Arg.) Tehler (1983); Roccellina cinerea f. sorediosa (Müll.Arg.) Tehler (1983)

Species of lichen

Crocellina is a monotypic fungal genus in the family Roccellaceae. It contains the single species Crocellina cinerea, a saxicolous (rock-dwelling), crustose lichen that is endemic to Socotra Island in the Indian Ocean. This cream-coloured crustose lichen is distinguished by its unusual three-layered internal structure, featuring a characteristic saffron-yellow middle band that gives the genus its name. The species was originally described in 1882 and was reclassified into its own genus in 2014 when molecular studies revealed it was genetically distinct from closely related lichens.

== Taxonomy ==
The genus Crocellina was circumscribed in 2014 by Anders Tehler and Damien Ertz to accommodate a distinct lineage of lichen-forming fungi previously classified under Roccellina. Its type and only species, Crocellina cinerea, was originally described as Dirina cinerea by Johannes Müller Argoviensis in 1882, based on material collected from Socotra Island. It was later transferred to Roccellina by Tehler before being reclassified under Crocellina once molecular data revealed that it did not belong within Roccellina's core group.

The defining features that distinguish Crocellina from closely related genera include a characteristic three-layered medulla with a distinctive saffron-yellow middle layer (the basis for the genus name, from Latin croceus), and a brown-tipped cortex composed of vertically arranged hyphae. These features, along with its molecular distinctiveness, support its recognition as a separate genus within the Roccellaceae. Although a sterile, sorediate form had previously been described as Dirina cinerea f. sorediosa, subsequent research has demonstrated that such asexual forms are the same species (conspecific) as their fertile counterparts and do not merit separate taxonomic status.

== Description ==
Crocellina is a crustose lichen-forming fungus with a distinctive cream-coloured thallus that can appear smooth or slightly wrinkled and convex. In well-developed specimens, the internal structure (medulla) shows a characteristic three-layered pattern: a white upper zone, a saffron-yellow middle band, and a greyish-brown lower layer. The yellow layer is sometimes only present beneath the fruiting structures. The outer surface (cortex) consists of vertically aligned hyphae with brown tips, embedded in a brownish gelatinous substance. Reproductive structures called soralia are uncommon but, when present, appear as small, rounded patches up to 1 mm in diameter. The lichen's photosynthetic partner is a green alga from the genus Trentepohlia.

The fungal fruiting bodies (apothecia) are disc-shaped and sit directly on the thallus. They are entire, not split or branched, and constricted at the base. A dark, carbon-rich hypothecium (the supportive tissue below the spore-producing layer) extends downward and merges with the lowest medullary layer. Ascospores are clear, spindle-shaped, slightly curved or straight, and measure around 18–21 μm in length by 5–6 μm in width. Asexual reproductive structures (pycnidia) are embedded in the thallus as greyish spots; they produce slender, curved conidia roughly 9–17 μm long and less than 1 μm wide.

Chemical spot tests reveal that the cortex reacts C+ (red), K–, and PD–. The yellow layer in the medulla turns purple in K. Thin-layer chromatography has identified several lichen products in Crocellina, including erythrin, lecanoric acid, roccellic acid, and skyrin.
