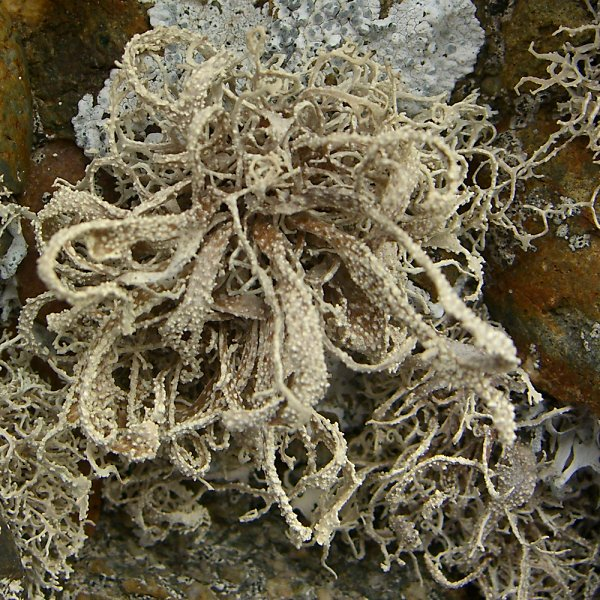
- Dendrographa leucophaea

Scientific classification
- Domain: Eukaryota
- Kingdom: Fungi
- Division: Ascomycota
- Class: Arthoniomycetes
- Order: Arthoniales
- Family: Roccellaceae
- Genus: Dendrographa; Darb. (1895)

Type species
- Dendrographa leucophaea (Tuck.) Darb. (1898)

Species
- D. alectoroides D. austrosorediata D. conformis D. decolorans D. franciscana D. latebrarum D. leucophaea

= Dendrographa =

Genus of lichen-forming fungi

Dendrographa is a genus of lichen-forming fungi in the family Roccellaceae. It has seven species. These lichens form small, shrubby tufts that cling to bark or coastal rocks along the Pacific seaboard, with brown-grey main branches and paler, pencil-thin tips that lack a protective outer skin. The genus was originally established in 1895 for a single Pacific coast species, but molecular studies in the 2010s expanded it by transferring four additional species from other genera and led to the discovery of a seventh species in Brazil.

== Taxonomy ==
The genus Dendrographa was circumscribed by the British lichenologist Otto Vernon Darbishire in 1895 to accommodate the distinctive Pacific-coast lichen then known as Roccella leucophaea; Darbishire recognised that its fruticose habit, ecorticate branch tips and calcium oxalate-encrusted medulla set it apart from Roccella and related genera. He therefore transferred the species as Dendrographa leucophaea and designated it the type species of his new genus.

For more than a century Dendrographa was treated as monospecific until Sundin and Tehler's 1996 monograph combined detailed morphology with thin-layer chromatography to define the genus more precisely and to describe a second species, D. alectoroides. Their study also documented two informal forms produced by vegetative fragmentation, emphasising that the genus was characterised by the absence of specialised propagules (isidia or soredia) and by protocetraric acid chemistry.

Molecular phylogenetics work in the early 2010s reshaped the genus. A broad rDNA/RPB2 analysis of the Arthoniales by Ertz and Tehler showed that four sorediate species previously scattered in Roccellina, Dirina and allied genera actually nested within the Dendrographa clade; they were therefore transferred as D. conformis, D. decolorans, D. franciscana and D. latebrarum in 2011. The decade closed with the description of D. austrosorediata from wave-washed granite in southern Brazil—the first member of the genus recorded outside the north-eastern Pacific—which expanded the genus to seven accepted species.

== Description ==
Dendrographa lichens form small, shrubby (fruticose) tufts that cling to bark or coastal rock along the Pacific seaboard of Baja California and California. The main branches are brown-grey and often flattened near the base, but the younger, pencil-thin tips—and the many side branchlets that burst through the surface—lack a protective skin (ecorticate) and appear paler, with a fine white, powdery bloom (pruina). Branches sometimes fuse to one another, and broken tips readily re-establish elsewhere, helping the lichen spread. A tightly packed outer cortex of parallel fungal threads (hyphae) encloses a looser inner medulla; some specimens accumulate tiny calcium oxalate crystals.

The genus does not produce dedicated vegetative propagules such as soredia or isidia, so reproduction relies chiefly on sexual fruit bodies (ascomata) and accidental fragmentation. Ascomata are small lateral discs, 0.3–3 mm across, that erupt through the cortex and eventually sit on a narrow base; their exposed surface is smooth, white and often slightly domed, ringed by a pale margin of cracked cortex. Each ascus contains eight colourless, three-segmented (3-septate) spindle-shaped ascospores, roughly 22–24 μm long by 6–8 μm wide, which are shot into the air when mature. Tiny black pycnidia—flask-shaped cavities sunken in the thallus—exude curved conidia about 11–15 μm long. The photosynthetic partner is the orange-tinged green alga Trentepohlia, whose coccoid cells (10–20 μm) are scattered throughout the interior.

All examined specimens contain protocetraric acid as their principal secondary metabolite, sometimes accompanied by trace amounts of fumarprotocetraric and succinprotocetraric acids; these closely related compounds are thought to deter grazers and mitigate ultraviolet stress.

== Species ==
- Dendrographa alectoroides Sundin & Tehler (1996)
- Dendrographa austrosorediata Aptroot & Gumboski (2017) – Brazil
- Dendrographa conformis (Tehler) Ertz & Tehler (2011)
- Dendrographa decolorans (Turner & Borrer) Ertz & Tehler (2011)
- Dendrographa franciscana (Zahlbr.) Ertz & Tehler (2011)
- Dendrographa latebrarum (Ach.) Ertz & Tehler (2011)
- Dendrographa leucophaea (Tuck.) Darb. (1898)
