= Baidera =

Scientific classification
- Kingdom: Fungi
- Division: Ascomycota
- Class: Arthoniomycetes
- Order: Arthoniales
- Family: Roccellaceae
- Genus: Baidera; Ertz & Diederich (2020)
- Species: B. mauritiana

Binomial name
- Baidera mauritiana Ertz & Diederich (2020)

Species of lichen

Baidera is a single-species fungal genus in the family Roccellaceae. It contains the species Baidera mauritiana, a corticolous (bark-dwelling), crustose lichen found in Mauritius. Both the genus and species were described as new to science in 2020 by Paul Diederich and Damien Ernst. The genus name honours Cláudia Baider, curator of the Mauritius Herbarium.

== Description ==
Baidera has a crustose thallus, meaning it forms a crust-like, thick, and compact growth on its substrate without a cortex (outer layer). The photobiont—the photosynthetic partner of the lichen—is trentepohlioid, which refers to a type of green algae.

Ascomata (fruiting bodies) are lirelliform, resembling elongated, narrow slits. These structures have a lecideine margin, meaning they have a black, carbonised edge. The hymenial disc, where spore development occurs, is pruinose, appearing frosted or powdery (pruinose but not woolly (tomentose). The excipulum, the outer layer of the ascomata, is dark brown to carbonised, as is the hypothecium, the supportive tissue beneath the spore-producing layer, extending down to the substrate.

The hymenium, the spore-bearing tissue, turns pale blue when treated with potassium hydroxide and iodine (K/I+ reaction). The paraphysoids, filamentous support structures within the hymenium, are mostly simple but can sometimes branch, particularly in the upper region (epihymenium), and end in a slightly enlarged apical cell. The asci, the sac-like structures where spores form, are narrowly club-shaped and exhibit a blue internal wall and a blue ring around a small ocular chamber when stained with K/I+, indicating the Abietina-type asci as described by Egea and Torrente in 1994.

The ascospores are hyaline (transparent), fusiform (spindle-shaped), and straight, lacking a distinct gelatinous sheath. Asexual reproductive structures called conidiomata are pycnidial, meaning they are flask-shaped. The conidiogenous cells, which produce asexual spores (conidia), are simple and straight, and the conidia themselves are hyaline and simple. Chemically, Baidera mauritiana contains psoromic acid, a secondary metabolite found in some lichens.
