= Ocellomma =

Scientific classification
- Kingdom: Fungi
- Division: Ascomycota
- Class: Arthoniomycetes
- Order: Arthoniales
- Family: Roccellaceae
- Genus: Ocellomma; Ertz & Tehler (2014)

Type species
- Ocellomma picconianum (Bagl.) Ertz & Tehler (2014)

Species
- O. picconianum O. rediuntum

Genus of lichens

Ocellomma is a small genus of lichen-forming fungi in the family Roccellaceae. These lichens form thin, nearly invisible crusts on tree bark and are easily overlooked until their tiny, eye-like fruiting bodies appear. The genus contains only two species, one found in Europe and the other with an unusual distribution spanning California and parts of Australia.

== Taxonomy ==
The genus was circumscribed in 2014 by Damien Ertz and Anders Tehler, following a molecular phylogenetic-based revision of the Roccellaceae. The type species, O. picconianum, which was originally named Lecania picconiana by Francesco Baglietto in 1862, was described from specimens collected in Italy. DNA-based phylogenetic analysis showed that it occupied a distinct genetic lineage, deserving of recognition as a new genus. The genus name Ocellomma alludes to the whitish rims on the small ascomata that contrast with the discs, giving them the appearance of small eyes.

== Description ==
Ocellomma forms an inconspicuous, tightly adherent crust (a crustose thallus) that blends with the bark on which it grows. Because the surface lacks a true cortex (ecorticate), it can look almost powder-thin and may take on the colour of the underlying wood. Its photosynthetic partner is the orange filamentous alga Trentepohlia.

The tiny fruit bodies emerge by cracking through the thallus (erumpent) and soon sit directly on the surface (sessile). Each is round to slightly elongate, only 0.2–0.5 mm across, and dusted with a pale, floury coating (pruinose). A narrow rim of thallus tissue packed with clear calcium oxalate crystals rings the disc, so the structures resemble miniature eyes. Internally the excipulum—the cup wall that supports the spore layer—is almost absent, but a pale blue-staining base (hypothecium) is visible in iodine. Slender, branched filaments weave through the spore layer, which contains eight colourless, slightly curved, three-celled ascospores measuring about 19–30 × 4–5 μm. Asexual flask-like pycnidia produce gently curved rod-shaped conidia 4–6 × 1 μm. Routine spot tests are negative (K−, C−, P−), and thin-layer chromatography detects only roccellic acid. The combination of a non-corticate crust, eye-like pruinose apothecia with a crystal-filled margin, and unsheathed 3-septate spores separates Ocellomma from superficially similar genera in the Roccellaceae.

== Habitat and distribution ==
Ocellomma picconianum occurs in Europe. O. rediuntum has an unusual disjunct distribution, occurring in both the coast of California, and in Australasia, including Kangaroo Island in South Australia, Victoria, and Tasmania. Both Ocellomma species are crustose and grow on bark.

== Species ==
- Ocellomma picconianum (Bagl.) Ertz & Tehler (2014)
- Ocellomma rediuntum (Stizenb. ex Hasse) Kantvilas, Gueidan & Tehler (2020)
