= Syncesia farinacea =

Scientific classification
- Domain: Eukaryota
- Kingdom: Fungi
- Division: Ascomycota
- Class: Arthoniomycetes
- Order: Arthoniales
- Family: Roccellaceae
- Genus: Syncesia
- Species: S. farinacea

Binomial name
- Syncesia farinacea (Fée) Tehler (1997)

Synonyms
- Chiodecton farinaceum Fée (1829)

Species of lichen

Syncesia farinacea is a species of lichen in the family Roccellaceae.

== Taxonomy ==
It was formally described as a new species in 1829 by Antoine Laurent Apollinaire Fée, who classified it in the genus Chiodecton. Anders Tehler transferred it to Syncesia in 1997. In molecular phylogenetics analysis, S. farinacea appeared in a clade in a sister position to S. hawaiiensis.

== Habitat and distribution ==
One of the most widespread species in Syncesia, S. farinacea has been recorded from Mexico, the West Indies (including Cuba, Puerto Rico, and the Leeward Islands), Panama, and South America, including Brazil, Colombia, Ecuador and Venezuela. It typically grows on tree and shrub bark, although in one instance it was recorded growing on rock. Its known distribution was greatly extended in 2013 when it was reported from Vietnam and from India. In Vietnam, it was found in the Chư Yang Sin National Park, growing over tree trunks in an evergreen forest at elevations of 600–800 m (2,000–2,600 ft). The Vietnamese specimens had textural differences in the thallus that the authors attributed to differences in environmental conditions. In India, it was recorded in Coonoor in Tamil Nadu, whee it was found growing on the bark of Annona muricata near a tea plantation.

== Description ==
The lichen has a creamy-white, water absorbent thallus that lacks a cortex and is 0.04–0.02 mm thick. It produces two lichen substances: protocetraric acid and roccellic acid.
