= Roccella =

Roccella may refer to:

- Roccella Valdemone, a municipality in Sicily, Italy
- Roccella Ionica (or Roccella Jonica), a municipality in Calabria, Italy
- Roccella (lichen), a lichen genus

== See also ==
- Roccellina, a genus of lichen-forming fungi
