= Protoroccella =

Scientific classification
- Domain: Eukaryota
- Kingdom: Fungi
- Division: Ascomycota
- Class: Arthoniomycetes
- Order: Arthoniales
- Family: Roccellaceae
- Genus: Protoroccella; Follmann ex Follmann (2001)
- Species: P. minima

Binomial name
- Protoroccella minima (R.Sant.) Follmann ex Follmann (2001)

Synonyms
- Genus: Protoroccella Sánchez-Pinto & M.Schulz (2001); Protoroccella Follmann (1995); Species: Protoroccella minima (R.Sant.) Follmann (1995); Roccella minima R.Sant. (1944)

Single-species fungal genus

Protoroccella is a fungal genus in the family Roccellaceae. It consists of the single species Protoroccella minima, a rare fruticose lichen found in Chile that grows on cactus.

== Taxonomy ==
The genus was originally circumscribed by the German lichenologist Gerhard Follmann in 1995. He proposed the genus to contain the species originally named Roccella minima by Rolf Santesson in 1944. However, the name was not validly published, because the name was not accompanied by a description or diagnosis of the taxon in Latin, which was a requirement of the nomenclatural rules at the time. In 2001, L. Sánchez-Pinto and Margot Schulz published the name, but again invalidly. Later in 2001, Follmann published the genus name validly.

Protoroccella follmannii is a species that was proposed for inclusion in the genus in 2001. This species, found growing on the ribs of the cactus Copiapoa atacamensis in Antofagasta, was also not validly published.

== Description ==
Protoroccella minima is a fruticose lichen, meaning it has a bushy, branched appearance. The branches grow up to 3 mm tall and are a pale, whitish-grey colour. The tips of the branches are club-shaped (clavate) and slightly warty (verruculose), and the branches themselves may be partially or completely hollow inside.

The ascomata (fruiting bodies) are flat or slightly wavy and measure between 0.5 and 1.5 mm in diameter. These ascomata can sometimes divide into smaller sections. The spores are small, measuring 9–15 μm long and 3–4 μm wide. Protoroccella minima also has numerous conidiomata, which are structures that produce asexual spores.

Chemically, the lichen reacts to certain spot tests, with the cortex and inner tissue (medulla) showing a yellowish-green to orange colour when treated with potassium hydroxide solution. The main chemical compound present in the lichen is psoromic acid, which is one of the secondary metabolites the lichen produces.

== Habitat and distribution ==
Protoroccella minima is a rare species known to occur only in northern Chile, where it grows on cacti.
