= Pulvinodecton =

Scientific classification
- Domain: Eukaryota
- Kingdom: Fungi
- Division: Ascomycota
- Class: Arthoniomycetes
- Order: Arthoniales
- Family: Roccellaceae
- Genus: Pulvinodecton; Henssen & G.Thor (1998)

Type species
- Pulvinodecton kurzii (Kremp.) Henssen & G.Thor (1998)

Species
- P. kurzii P. seychellensis

Genus of lichens

Pulvinodecton is a small genus of lichen-forming fungi in the family Roccellaceae. It comprises two species of corticolous (bark-dwelling) crustose lichens. These lichens are found exclusively in humid tropical rainforests, where they grow on tree bark in shaded locations from sea level to about 400 metres elevation. One species ranges across the Indo-Pacific region while the other is found only in the Seychelles islands. The lichens form thin, greyish crusts on bark that develop distinctive star-shaped fruiting bodies and powdery mounds for reproduction. They can be recognized by their orange-red crystal deposits that give older parts a rusty appearance.

== Taxonomy ==
The genus was circumscribed in 1998 by the lichenologists Aino Henssen and Göran Thor, with Pulvinodecton kurzii assigned as the type species. This species was originally described as Pyrenodesmia kurzii by August von Krempelhuber in 1873. Pulvinodecton differs from Erythrodecton in having spindle-shaped (fusiform) rather than doubly club-shaped (biclavate) ascospores, and by the development of its ascocarp. Another ditinguishing feature is the unusual pycnidia of Pulvinodecton species, which feature a deeply divided cavity with more than one ostiole.

== Description ==
Pulvinodecton forms a thin, crust-like thallus that ranges from greenish- to brownish-grey and may develop small wart-like swellings. The lichen body is built of tightly interwoven fungal filaments with orange-red crystals of rhodocladonic acid scattered through the tissue, giving older parts a rusty tint. Most of the thallus has a homoiomerous make-up—fungal and algal cells are mixed throughout—but in thicker patches the photobiont (a green alga in the genus Trentepohlia) tends to sit near the surface while the interior becomes packed with crystals. These thickened areas often break open as cushion-shaped soralia: low, powdery mounds that release soredia (tiny bundles of algal cells wrapped in short-celled hyphae, roughly 15 μm across) as the main means of vegetative spread. There is no woolly, byssoid under-layer; instead, colourless root-like hyphae anchor the lichen directly to bark and can run for several millimetres through cracks in the substrate.

Sexual reproduction takes place inside a firm stroma that starts as a swollen thalline lump with a narrow "foot". Within it, a single large apothecium—essentially a shallow fungal cup—develops. As the cup matures its brown disc often splits and grows upwards, so one sees two or more smaller discs arranged in a star- or wheel-like pattern on the same mound. A black, carbonised layer underlies the hymenium and eventually reaches right down to the bark, while the true excipulum (rim) is reduced to a dark collar. The hymenium itself stains blue with iodine, showing it is amyloid, and contains densely branched paraphyses. Asci are long, thin and eight-spored; the colourless ascospores are delicate, spindle-shaped and divided by cross walls (usually 6–13), measuring about 45–70 × 3–4 μm, depending on the species. A second set of tiny black fruit bodies (pycnidia) provides the asexual spores. These structures sit either singly in rounded warts or clustered in small stromata; inside, the cavity is oddly subdivided and opens by two or three pores rather than one. Each pycnidium produces straight, rod-like conidia about 5 × 1 μm. Chemically, every species examined produces rhodocladonic acid together with barbatic and squamatic acids, and some populations add minor depsides such as 4-O-demethyl-barbatic or obtusatic acid. The combination of a crystal-laden crust, star-shaped proliferating apothecia, multi-pored pycnidia and a distinctive orange pigment makes Pulvinodecton easy to recognise even in the field.

== Habitat and distribution ==
Pulvinodecton lichens grow exclusively on bark, anchoring themselves with colourless, root-like hyphae that can thread several millimetres into fissures of the substrate. They favour persistently humid, shaded conditions in low- to mid-elevation tropical rainforests; field collections come from valley bottoms near sea-level to about 400 m in evergreen or monsoon forest where the bark remains damp for long periods. The crustose thallus frequently develops on the smooth trunks of broad-leaved trees and even palms, with soralia forming where the cortex thickens and cracks. Such corticolous habits, combined with a need for relatively undisturbed canopy cover, mean the genus is typically encountered in protected forest reserves rather than secondary growth.

Only two species are presently recognised. Pulvinodecton kurzii ranges across the Indo-Pacific tropics and subtropics: early material was collected in the Andaman Islands and Sri Lanka, and subsequent records extend through continental South-East Asia to Japan's Yaeyama Islands; the species is also confirmed from Fiji and northern Australia . By contrast, P. seychellensis is endemic to the granitic Seychelles: it has been recorded solely from moist palm forest on Praslin and, once, on Mahé, where it colonises the trunks of the endemic coco-de-mer (Lodoicea) between 150 m and 400 m elevation.

== Species ==
Species Fungorum (in the Catalogue of Life) accept two species of Pulvinodecton :

- Pulvinodecton kurzii (Kremp.) Henssen & G.Thor (1998)
- Pulvinodecton seychellensis Henssen & G.Thor (1998)
