= Diromma =

Scientific classification
- Kingdom: Fungi
- Division: Ascomycota
- Class: Arthoniomycetes
- Order: Arthoniales
- Family: Roccellaceae
- Genus: Diromma; Ertz & Tehler (2014)
- Species: D. dirinellum

Binomial name
- Diromma dirinellum (Nyl.) Ertz & Tehler (2014)

Synonyms
- Platygrapha dirinella Nyl. (1856); Lecania diplotommoides Bagl. (1862); Schismatomma dirinellum (Nyl.) Zahlbr. (1923)

Species of lichen

Diromma is a monotypic fungal genus in the family Roccellaceae. It contains the single species Diromma dirinellum, a rare crustose lichen that grows as a parasite on the lichen Dirina ceratoniae. It has a distribution restricted to the Mediterranean Basin.

== Taxonomy ==
This species was first described in 1882 by Finnish lichenologist William Nylander as Platygrapha dirinella, from specimens collected in Sardinia, Italy. It was transferred to Schismatomma in 1923 by Alexander Zahlbruckner, and considered a member of that genus for nearly a century. The genus Diromma was circumscribed in 2014 by Anders Tehler and Damien Ernst, following molecular phylogenetic analysis and revision of the Roccellaceae. This analysis showed that the species was a quite distinct lineage in the Roccellaceae. The genus name alludes to both its phylogenetic closeness to Dirina, and its morphological similarity with Schismatomma.

== Description ==
Diromma dirinellum has a crustose thallus with a cortex. Its ascomata, which are immersed (or partly so) in the thallus, measure 0.2–0.6 mm in diameter, and have a more or less circular to irregular outline. Ascospores are hyaline with 3 septa, and measure 20–30.5 by 4.5–5.5 μm; they are not enclosed in a gelatinous sheath. The photobiont partner is trentepholioid – green algae from genus Trentepohlia. The lichen contains roccellic acid, but does not react with any of the standard chemical spot tests (K−, C−, P−).
