= Isalonactis =

Scientific classification
- Domain: Eukaryota
- Kingdom: Fungi
- Division: Ascomycota
- Class: Arthoniomycetes
- Order: Arthoniales
- Family: Roccellaceae
- Genus: Isalonactis; Ertz, Tehler, Eb.Fisch., Killmann, Razafindr. & Sérus. (2014)
- Species: I. madagascariensis

Binomial name
- Isalonactis madagascariensis Ertz, Tehler, Eb.Fisch., Killmann, Razafindr. & Sérus. (2014)

Species of lichen

Isalonactis is a monotypic fungal genus in the family Roccellaceae. It contains the single species Isalonactis madagascariensis, a saxicolous (rock-dwelling), crustose lichen found in Madagascar. This lichen forms thin, cream-coloured crusts on sandstone rocks and produces tiny fruiting bodies dusted with white crystals. The genus was established in 2014 when scientists discovered this unique lichen in Madagascar's Isalo region and determined it was genetically distinct from all known lichen groups.

== Taxonomy ==
Isalonactis was circumscribed in 2014 after collections on sheltered sandstone in Madagascar's Isalo Massif revealed a crustose lichen that could not be assigned to any existing genus. Damien Ertz and colleagues erected the genus and its only species, Isalonactis madagascariensis, on the basis of a unique combination of characters: a sorediate, non-corticate thallus containing psoromic acid, minute white-pruinose apothecia (fruiting bodies) with a thalline margin, and 3-septate, colourless ascospores. Because the genus contains a single species it is monospecific. The generic name honours the Isalo region and acknowledges morphological affinities with Lecanactis (the suffix -nactis is common within Roccellaceae).

Molecular analyses of nuclear large-subunit ribosomal DNA (nuLSU) and the RPB2 gene place Isalonactis firmly within the family Roccellaceae. In a two-locus Bayesian phylogeny the species forms a well-supported clade that is sister to Lecanactis, with Chiodecton branching next. Morphologically the new genus differs from Lecanactis by having a pale, non-carbonised (blackened) hypothecium and, uniquely, by producing soredia; it is separated from Chiodecton by its discrete, disc-shaped apothecia (rather than lirellae or stromatic clusters) and by its straight, rather than obovate, spores.

== Description ==
The lichen forms a thin, crust-like (crustose) body, or thallus, that lies flat on siliceous rock. It lacks a protective cortex and instead presents a pale-cream surface that often cracks into tiny areoles 0.2–0.7 mm across. Powdery reproductive granules called soredia, which contain both the fungal and algal partners, are common and give parts of the thallus a mealy appearance. Under the microscope the algal layer is made up of orange-tinged cells of the green algal genus Trentepohlia. Numerous colourless crystals scattered through the surface dissolve in potassium hydroxide solution, a standard spot test. Psoromic acid, a secondary metabolite that turns slate-grey paper yellow in thin-layer chromatography, is consistently present.

Sexual fruit bodies (apothecia) are tiny—typically 0.3–0.5 mm in diameter—and may appear singly on each areole. They begin immersed in the thallus but soon erupt so that their flat, pale-brown discs sit flush with the surface. A narrow rim formed from the surrounding thallus tissue (the thalline margin) encircles each disc, and a fine white frosting of crystals (pruina) dusts the top. Internally, the hymenium (spore-bearing layer) is about 90–110 μm tall and stains blue in iodine, indicating an amyloid reaction. Beneath it lies a pale-brown hypothecium that lacks the carbonised walls typical of many relatives.

Asci are club-shaped, eight-spored, and release narrowly ellipsoid, 3-septate ascospores measuring 22–27 μm long by about 5 μm wide; the septa form sequentially, beginning with a median partition, and the cells remain roughly equal in length. Asexual reproduction occurs in tiny, immersed pycnidia that exude curved, thread-like conidia 12–23 μm long. Standard chemical spot tests show the thallus is K−, C−, and P+ (yellow), the latter reaction reflecting psoromic acid. Together, these features—sorediate crust, chemical profile, pruinose apothecia, pale tissues, and slender three-celled spores—distinguish Isalonactis from other genera in the Roccellaceae.
