= Haplodina =

Scientific classification
- Domain: Eukaryota
- Kingdom: Fungi
- Division: Ascomycota
- Class: Arthoniomycetes
- Order: Arthoniales
- Family: Roccellaceae
- Genus: Haplodina; Zahlbr.

Species
- H. alutacea H. corticola H. microcarpa

Genus of fungi

Haplodina is a lichenized genus of fungi in the family Roccellaceae.
