= Simonyella =

Scientific classification
- Domain: Eukaryota
- Kingdom: Fungi
- Division: Ascomycota
- Class: Arthoniomycetes
- Order: Arthoniales
- Family: Roccellaceae
- Genus: Simonyella; J.Steiner (1902)

Type species
- Simonyella variegata J.Steiner (1902)

Genus of fungi

Simonyella is a genus of lichenized fungi in the family Roccellaceae. A monotypic genus, it contains the single species Simonyella variegata J. Steiner (1902).

The genus was circumscribed by Julius Steiner in Denkschr. Kaiserl. Akad. Wiss. Math.-Nat. Kl. vol.71: I, on page 96 in 1902.

The genus name of Simonyella is in honour of Oscar Simony (1852–1915), who was an Austrian mathematician and mountaineer. He was Professor of Mathematics and Physics in Vienna.
