= Enterodictyon =

Scientific classification
- Domain: Eukaryota
- Kingdom: Fungi
- Division: Ascomycota
- Class: Arthoniomycetes
- Order: Arthoniales
- Family: Roccellaceae
- Genus: Enterodictyon; Müll.Arg. (1892)

Type species
- Enterodictyon indicum Müll.Arg. (1892)

Species
- E. indicum E. oblongellum E. velatum

Genus of lichens

Enterodictyon is a genus of lichen-forming fungi in the family Roccellaceae.
