= Diplogramma =

Scientific classification
- Domain: Eukaryota
- Kingdom: Fungi
- Division: Ascomycota
- Class: Arthoniomycetes
- Order: Arthoniales
- Family: Roccellaceae
- Genus: Diplogramma; Müll.Arg. (1891)

Type species
- Diplogramma australiensis Müll.Arg. (1891)

Genus of fungi

Diplogramma is a lichenized genus of fungi in the family Roccellaceae. This is a monotypic genus, containing the single species Diplogramma australiensis.
