= Gyronactis =

Scientific classification
- Kingdom: Fungi
- Division: Ascomycota
- Class: Arthoniomycetes
- Order: Arthoniales
- Family: Roccellaceae
- Genus: Gyronactis; Ertz & Tehler (2014)

Type species
- Gyronactis asiatica Ertz & Tehler (2014)

Species
- G. asiatica G. elaeocarpa

Genus of lichens

Gyronactis is a genus of lichen-forming fungi in the family Roccellaceae. It has two species. The genus was circumscribed by Damien Ernst and Anders Tehler in 2014, with G. asiatica assigned as the type species. This lichen, formerly placed in Lecanactis, is only known from the type locality in Myanmar. The genus name alludes to both its similarity with Lecanactis and the presence of gyrophoric acid in the thallus.

Gyronactis species have a greyish-green to greyish-brown crustose thallus with verrucae and a dark brown prothallus. The hypothecium is pale and not carbonised (unlike Lecanactis), and the curved conidia measure 6–8 by 2–2.5 μm.
