= Tania (lichen) =

Scientific classification
- Domain: Eukaryota
- Kingdom: Fungi
- Division: Ascomycota
- Class: Arthoniomycetes
- Order: Arthoniales
- Family: Roccellaceae
- Genus: Tania; Egea, Torrente & Sipman (1995)

Type species
- Tania lanosa Egea, Torrente & Sipman (1995)

Species
- T. lanosa T. mohamedii

Genus of lichens

Tania is a genus of lichen-forming fungi in the family Roccellaceae. It comprises two species. "The genus was established in 1995 and is named after the bryologist Benito Ching Tan, who helped collect the original specimen from Mount Kinabalu. These lichens are distinguished by their unusual cotton-wool-like appearance that forms loose, fibrous crusts on tree bark, unlike the smooth surfaces typical of other lichens.

== Taxonomy ==
The genus was circumscribed by Maria Egea Fernández, Pilar Torrente and Harrie Sipman in 1995, with Tania lanosa assigned as the type, and at that time, only species. A second species, T. mohamedii, was added to the genus in 2006. The genus name honours the bryologist Benito Ching Tan (1946–2016), who organized the expedition to Mount Kinabalu and collected the type species with Sipman.

== Description ==
Tania forms a loose, cotton-wool-like (byssoid) crust that spreads irregularly across the bark. Because the fungal threads (hyphae) are only loosely interwoven and lack a protective skin (it is ecorticate), the surface looks fibrous rather than smooth. In vertical section the lichen is homoiomerous, meaning algal and fungal cells are mixed together rather than arranged in separate layers. The partner alga is a Trentepohlia-type green alga whose rounded cells measure about 10–15 × 8–12 μm. A pale to dark grey prothallus – a marginal zone where only fungal hyphae occur – often outlines the thallus.

The reproductive bodies are small, stalk-less discs (apothecia) 0.2–0.7 mm across that sit on a slightly narrowed base. Each disc is ringed by a prominent dark margin; this lecideoid margin is made of tightly cemented, dark-brown hyphae (an excipulum) that extend down into the thallus. The disc itself remains black and lacks any pale dusting (epruinose). Inside, a clear tissue layer (hymenium, 80–90 μm tall) contains sparse, simply branched paraphysoids whose swollen tips give the surface a dull brown glaze (epithecium).

Microscopically, each sac-like ascus has a double wall that splits open when mature (fissitunicate) and carries eight spores. A faint, blue-staining ring (hemiamyloid structure) is visible near the ascus tip in iodine staining tests, a character typical of the order Arthoniales. The spores are colourless, spindle-shaped (fusiform), three-celled, and measure 26–33 × 4–5 μm; they lack any gelatinous halo. No asexual reproductive structures have been observed. Standard chemical spot tests are negative, but thin-layer chromatography shows the presence of schizopeltic acid, an uncommon lichen product.

== Species ==
- Tania lanosa Egea, Torrente & Sipman (1995)
- Tania mohamedii H.Harada & Yoshik.Yamam. (2006)
