= Psoronactis =

Scientific classification
- Kingdom: Fungi
- Division: Ascomycota
- Class: Arthoniomycetes
- Order: Arthoniales
- Family: Roccellaceae
- Genus: Psoronactis; Ertz & Tehler (2014)
- Species: P. dilleniana

Binomial name
- Psoronactis dilleniana (Ach.) Ertz & Tehler (2014)

Synonyms
- List: Lichen dillenianus Ach. (1799); Lecidea dilleniana (Ach.) Ach. (1803); Lichen peltatus * dilleniana (Ach.) Lam. (1813); Lecidea contigua * dilleniana (Ach.) Torss. (1843); Coniangium dillenianum (Ach.) A.Massal. (1853); Lecanactis dilleniana (Ach.) Körb. (1855); Lecidea farinosa * dilleniana (Ach.) Nyl. (1861); Opegrapha dilleniana (Ach.) Almq. (1869); Lecidea farinosa subsp. dilleniana (Ach.) Cromb. (1870); Lecanographa dilleniana (Ach.) Hafellner & Obermayer (2013)

Single-species lichen genus

Psoronactis is a monotypic fungal genus in the family Roccellaceae. It contains the single species Psoronactis dilleniana, a saxicolous (rock-dwelling), crustose lichen. The lichen grows as a pale grey-to-fawn crust that spreads across the face of the rock while its black, pin-head-sized fruit bodies sit flush with, or slightly above, the surface.

== Taxonomy ==
Psoronactis dilleniana was first described in 1799 by the Swedish lichenologist Erik Acharius as Lichen dillenianus. The taxon was shuffled to several genera in the 1800s as different authors had different opinions on how to classify the species; in more modern times, it was transferred to genus Lecanographa in 2013. Psoronactis was circumscribed in 2014 by Damien Ernst and Anders Tehler, following molecular phylogenetic analysis and revision of the Roccellaceae that showed the species occupied a distinct lineage in the family. The genus name alludes to the lichen products present in its thallus: psoromic acid and 2'-O-demethylpsoromic acid. It is these compounds that differentiate it chemically from the similar genus Lecanactis.

== Description ==
Psoronactis dilleniana spreads as a pale, sometimes slightly woolly crust that sits flat against the bark or rock it colonises. Because the surface lacks a true cortex, it can look rather powdery or felt-like (tomentose-scurfy) at close range. Fresh material is usually grey tinged with mauve or dull orange-pink, fading to cream or pale brown after drying in a herbarium. The lichen's photosynthetic partner is the orange filamentous alga Trentepohlia, whose threads weave through the fungal matrix. Well-developed thalli may reach 3 mm thick, but most populations are much thinner. Standard chemical spot tests are largely negative (K−, C−, KC−), yet the P reagent produces a yellow-orange stain, a quick field clue to the presence of psoromic and 2'-O-demethylpsoromic acids detected by thin-layer chromatography.

The spore-bearing structures are small, black apothecia—rounded discs 0.4–1.5 mm across—that sit directly on the thallus yet are slightly pinched in at the base. Each disc is dusted with a greyish-white frost of crystals (pruina) and rimmed by a persistent, usually black margin. Inside, the dark-brown excipulum reacts only weakly with potassium hydroxide (K+ olive), whereas the underlying tissue (hypothecium) is exceptionally thick (up to 280 μm) and completely carbonised, giving the apothecia their sooty look. The spore layer (hymenium) is 70–100 μm tall and turns red in iodine, a diagnostic colour change that helps separate Psoronactis from superficially similar genera.

Slender support filaments (paraphysoids) thread the hymenium; they branch sparingly, fuse together here and there, and end in slightly enlarged brown tips. Eight ascospores develop in each cylindrical-to-club-shaped ascus. These spores are colourless, spindle-shaped, usually a little curved, and divided by three internal walls; they measure roughly 20–30 × 4–5 μm and, unlike many relatives, carry no gelatinous coat. Minute flask-shaped pycnidia, visible as black pin-pricks in the thallus, release straight bacilliform conidia 6–8 × 1–1.2 μm that serve as an additional means of dispersal. When combined—the felted, cortex-less crust, carbonised hypothecium, psoromic-acid chemistry, and unsheathed three-septate spores—these characters make Psoronactis readily recognisable among roccellacean lichens.

== Habitat and distribution ==
Psoronactis dilleniana is known only from a handful of modern, DNA-confirmed collections made in Belgium. All of those vouchers were taken from hard rock rather than from tree-bark or soil, indicating that the species is saxicolous—i.e. it lives directly on stone surfaces. Field notes associated with these Belgian specimens show the lichen as a pale grey-to-fawn crust that spreads across the face of the rock while its black, pin-head-sized fruit-bodies sit flush with, or slightly above, the surface. This crustose growth form means the fungal threads (hyphae) grow tightly into the outermost millimetres of the stone, anchoring the thallus so firmly that it cannot be peeled away without taking grains of the substrate with it.

Because every verified collection so far comes from temperate north-western Europe, the current evidence suggests a distinctly local distribution restricted to that region. The authors point out that historical records of Lecanactis dilleniana (an older name for the same organism) from elsewhere have not yet been checked with DNA or modern chemistry, so Psoronactis may eventually prove more widespread.
