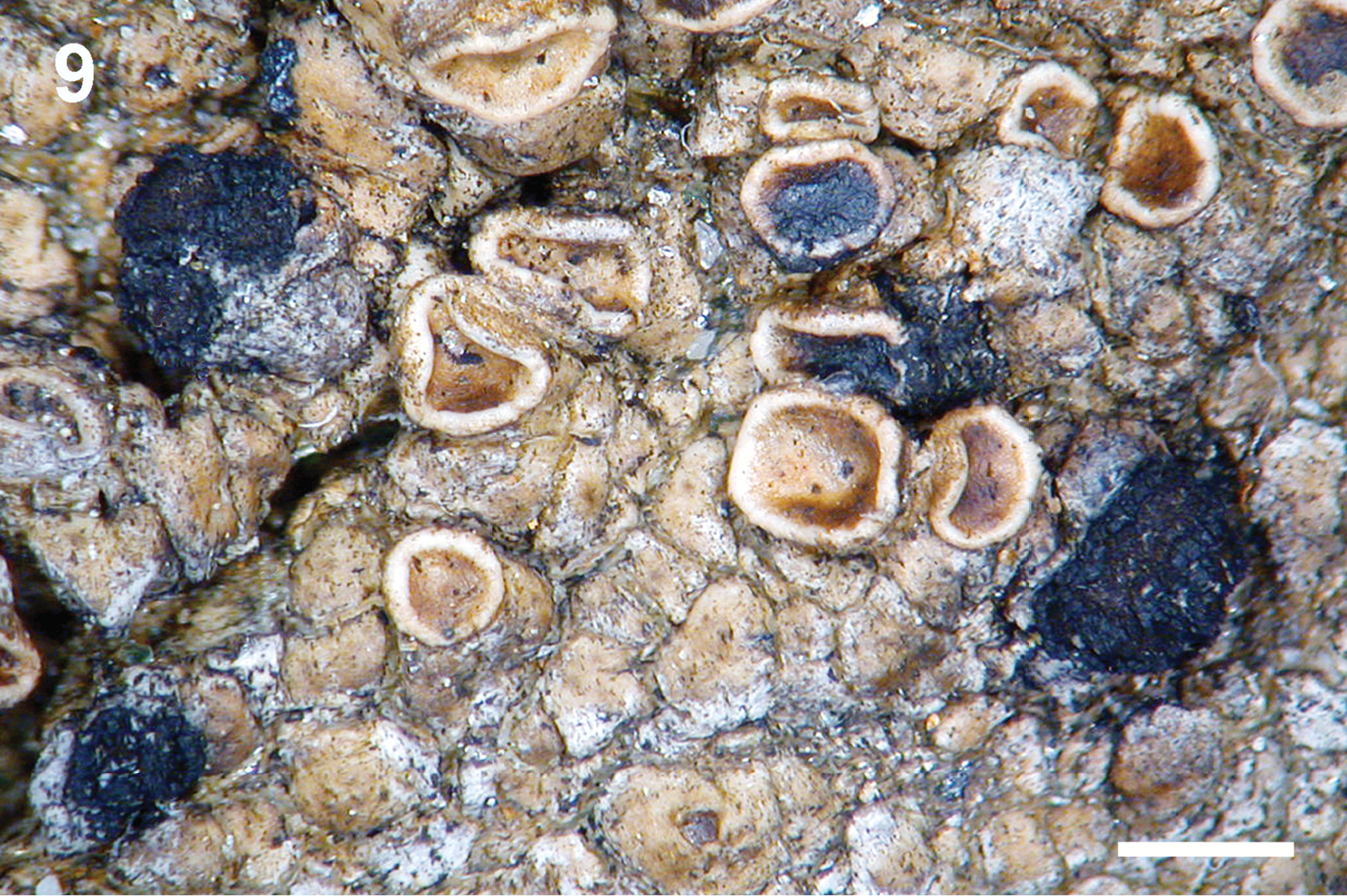
- Phacographa protoparmeliae (blackened areas) parasitising the thallus of Protoparmelia badia

Scientific classification
- Kingdom: Fungi
- Division: Ascomycota
- Class: Arthoniomycetes
- Order: Arthoniales
- Family: Roccellaceae
- Genus: Phacographa; Hafellner (2009)

Type species
- Phacographa glaucomaria (Nyl.) Hafellner (2009)

Species
- P. glaucomaria P. protoparmeliae P. zwackhii

= Phacographa =

Genus of fungi

Phacographa is a genus of lichenicolous (lichen-dwelling) fungi in the family Roccellaceae. It has three species.

== Taxonomy ==
The genus was circumscribed in 2009 by the Austrian lichenologist Josef Hafellner, who assigned Phacographa glaucomaria as the type species. This species was originally described by William Nylander in 1852 as a member of the genus Lecidea. In addition to the type, another species was transferred from the genus Opegrapha, and a third species was described as new. The genus name, which combines the Greek phakos 'lentil' with grapho 'write', alludes to its relationship with the genera Phacothecium and Opegrapha.

== Description ==
Species in Phacographa make lecideioid fruiting bodies (ascoma) that are roundish and carbonised (blackened). One hymenium is made per ascoma, and they are exposed early in their development, resulting in bits of plectenchyma (fungal tissue) that crumbles off. The fungi produce an insoluble pigment, known variously as "pigment 1" or "Atra-brown", that is known to occur in several other species in the Arthoniales.

Phacographa species make hyaline (translucent) ascospores with three septa (internal partitions) and rounded ends. A thin sheath (the perispore) initially covering the spore eventually results in a verruculose (slightly pimply) surface texture in maturity.

== Species ==
As of August 2024, Species Fungorum (in the Catalogue of Life) accepts three species of Phacographa.

- Phacographa glaucomaria (Nyl.) Hafellner (2009) – host: Glaucomaria rupicola
- Phacographa protoparmeliae Hafellner (2009) – host: Protoparmelia badia
- Phacographa zwackhii (A.Massal. ex Zwackh) Hafellner (2009) – host: Phlyctis
