= Schismatomma pericleum =

Scientific classification
- Kingdom: Fungi
- Division: Ascomycota
- Class: Arthoniomycetes
- Order: Arthoniales
- Family: Roccellaceae
- Genus: Schismatomma
- Species: S. pericleum

Binomial name
- Schismatomma pericleum (Ach.) Branth & Rostr.

Species of fungus

Schismatomma pericleum is a species of fungus belonging to the family Roccellaceae.

It is native to Eurasia and Northern America.
