= Sipmania =

Scientific classification
- Kingdom: Fungi
- Division: Ascomycota
- Class: Arthoniomycetes
- Order: Arthoniales
- Family: Roccellaceae
- Genus: Sipmania; Egea & Torrente (1994)

Type species
- Sipmania peltata Egea & Torrente (1994)

Genus of fungi

Sipmania is a genus of lichenized fungi within the order Arthoniales. The genus has been placed into the family Roccellaceae. This is a monotypic genus, containing the single species Sipmania peltata.

The genus was circumscribed by José Maria Egea Fernández and P. Torrente in Biblioth. Lichenol. vol.54 on pages 6 and 165 in 1994.

The genus name of Sipmania is in honour of Henricus (Harrie) Johannes Maria Sipman (born 1945) is a Dutch lichenologist. He specialises in tropical and subtropical lichens, and has authored or co-authored more than 250 scientific publications.
