= Graphidastra =

Scientific classification
- Domain: Eukaryota
- Kingdom: Fungi
- Division: Ascomycota
- Class: Arthoniomycetes
- Order: Arthoniales
- Family: Roccellaceae
- Genus: Graphidastra (Redinger) G.Thor (1990)

Type species
- Dirina gemmata (Leight.) Redinger (1990)

Species
- G. byssiseda G. himalayana G. japonica G. laii G. multiformis

Genus of lichen-forming fungi

Graphidastra is a genus of lichen-forming fungi in the family Roccellaceae.

== Species ==
As of July 2024, Species Fungorum (in the Catalogue of Life) accept five species of Graphidastra:

- Graphidastra byssiseda (Müll.Arg.) G.Thor (1990)
- Graphidastra himalayana Jagadeesh & G.P.Sinha (2010)
- Graphidastra japonica A.Sakata & H.Harada (2014)
- Graphidastra laii Aptroot & Sparrius (2006)
- Graphidastra multiformis (Mont. & Bosch) G.Thor (1990)
