= Dichosporidium =

Scientific classification
- Domain: Eukaryota
- Kingdom: Fungi
- Division: Ascomycota
- Class: Arthoniomycetes
- Order: Arthoniales
- Family: Roccellaceae
- Genus: Dichosporidium; Pat. (1903)

Type species
- Dichosporidium glomeratum (Pat.) Pat. (1903)

Species
- D. boschianum D. brunnthaleri D. constrictum D. glomeratum D. latisporum D. microsporum D. sorediatum

Genus of lichen-forming fungi

Dichosporidium is a genus of lichen-forming fungi in the family Roccellaceae.
