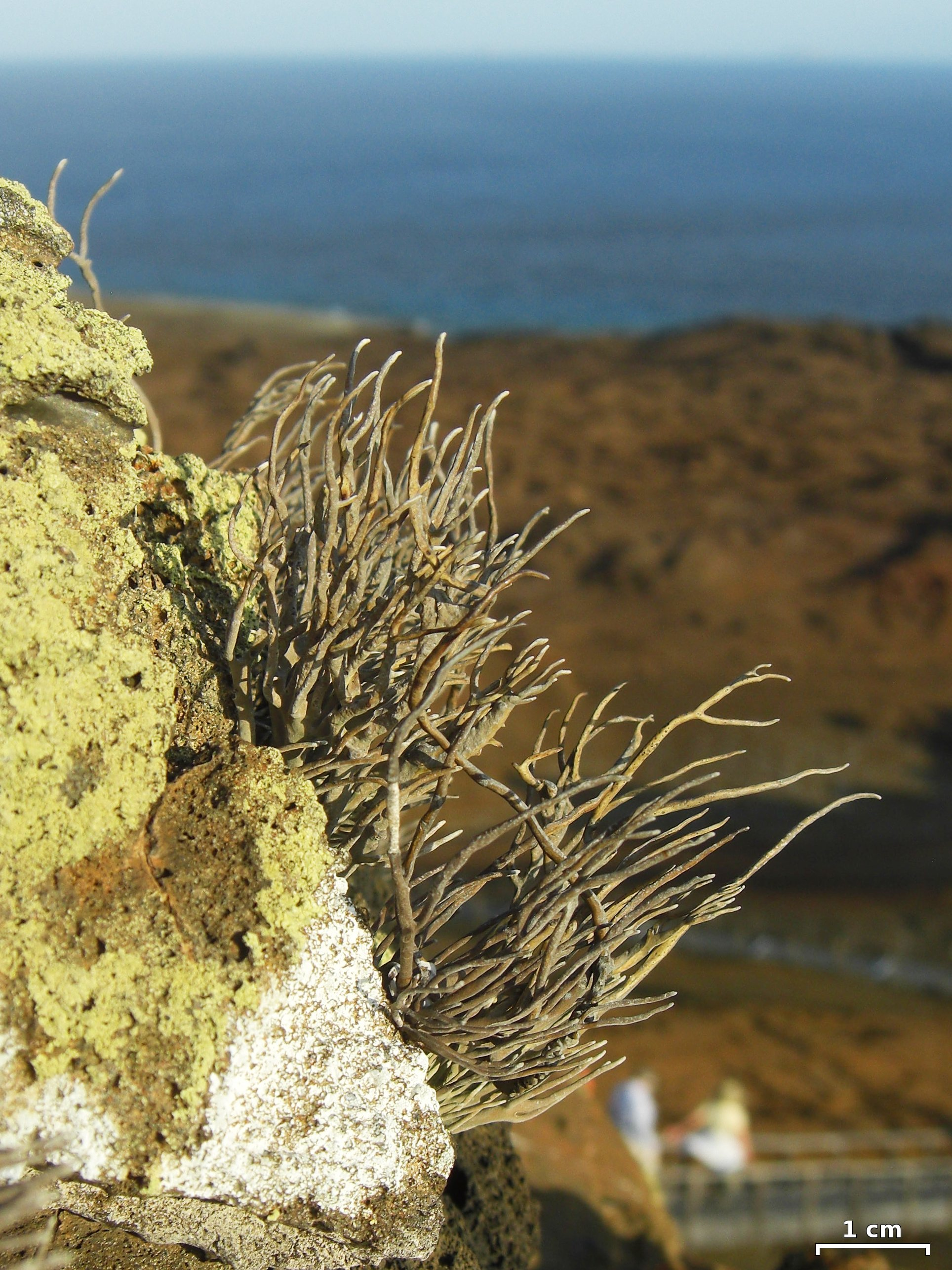

Scientific classification
- Domain: Eukaryota
- Kingdom: Fungi
- Division: Ascomycota
- Class: Arthoniomycetes
- Order: Arthoniales
- Family: Roccellaceae
- Genus: Roccella
- Species: R. galapagoensis

Binomial name
- Roccella galapagoensis Follmann (1968)

= Roccella galapagoensis =

Species of lichen

Roccella galapagoensis is a species of fruticose lichen in the family Roccellaceae. It is endemic to the Galápagos Islands.

== Taxonomy ==
First described by the German lichenologist Gerhard Follmann in 1968, Roccella galapagoensis was discovered in abundance on the Galapagos Islands' South Plaza Island, particularly on the island's highest points. The official type specimen is held at the University of Colorado Museum, Boulder. Over the years, the species has been linked with several other names, including Roccella obscurissima, Roccella geniculata, Roccella glebaria, and Roccella colonii, based on specimens found in various locales across the Galapagos.

== Description ==
This lichen species has a cylindrical thallus structure, with main branches usually measuring between 5 and 20 cm (2 and 8 in) in length. Its secondary branches are typically partially compressed but not markedly flattened. The thallus colour ranges from brownish-grey to grey. Ascomata, the fruiting bodies of the lichen, are present and have circular outlines with occasional undulating margins. Roccella lirellina, previously thought to form a species pair with Roccella galapagoensis, has been shown to have a distinct monophyletic genotype.

== Distribution ==
Its distribution in the Galapagos Archipelago includes Española, Floreana, Genovesa, Isabela, Santa Cruz, Santa Cruz, Santa Cruz, Santa Fé, and Santiago Islands.
