= Gorgadesia =

Scientific classification
- Domain: Eukaryota
- Kingdom: Fungi
- Division: Ascomycota
- Class: Arthoniomycetes
- Order: Arthoniales
- Family: Roccellaceae
- Genus: Gorgadesia; Tav.

Type species
- Gorgadesia mira Tav.

Genus of fungi

Gorgadesia is a genus of lichenized fungi in the family Roccellaceae. A monotypic genus, it contains the single species Gorgadesia mira.

The genus name of Gorgadesia is derived from Gorgades, the ancient name of the Cabo Verde archipelago, the home of the mythological Gorgons.

The genus was circumscribed by Carlos das Neves Tavares in Revista Biol. (Lisbon) vol.4 on page 132 in 1964.
