= Austrographa =

Scientific classification
- Domain: Eukaryota
- Kingdom: Fungi
- Division: Ascomycota
- Class: Arthoniomycetes
- Order: Arthoniales
- Family: Roccellaceae
- Genus: Austrographa; Sparrius, Elix & A.W.Archer (2013)

Type species
- Austrographa kurriminensis Sparrius, Elix & A.W.Archer (2013)

Species
- A. kurriminensis A. pseudopallidella A. skyrinica

Synonyms
- Austrographa Sparrius, Elix & A.W.Archer (2010); Austrographa Sparrius, Elix & A.W.Archer (2011)

Genus of lichens

Austrographa is a genus of lichen-forming fungi in the family Roccellaceae. It has three species. The genus was circumscribed in 2013 by lichenologists Laurens Sparrius, John Elix, and Alan Archer, with Austrographa kurriminensis assigned as the type species. The genus had been published invalidly on two separate occasions. All three species in the genus were found in a mangrove stand in Queensland, Australia. The genus was discovered in Australia, and the name Austrographa reflects this.

== Description ==
Austrographa is a genus of crustose, corticolous (bark-dwelling) lichens, with a smooth, water-repellent thallus densely filled with fine crystals and a cortical gel. The thallus is not byssoid and lacks roccellinic acid. The photobiont of the lichen is from Trentpohlia, a genus of green algae. The ascomata are rounded to lirellate, usually aggregated in linear or rounded pseudostromata. The hyaline excipulum is made of richly branched periclinal hyphae filled with crystals, and the thalline margin is slightly paler than the thallus. The epithecium is orange to straw-colored, and the hypothecium is carbonized and dark brown. The paraphysoids are frequently branched and anastomosed, and the asci are 8-spored, cylindrical, and Opegrapha-type, with a distinct apical dome. Ascospores are acicular, hyaline, curved, and thin-walled, measuring 45–60 by 2.0–3.0 μm and contain three septa. Conidiomata were not observed in collected specimens.

== Species ==
- Austrographa kurriminensis Sparrius, Elix & A.W.Archer (2013)
- Austrographa pseudopallidella Sparrius, Elix & A.W.Archer (2013)
- Austrographa skyrinica Sparrius, Elix & A.W.Archer (2013)
