= Halographis =

Scientific classification
- Domain: Eukaryota
- Kingdom: Fungi
- Division: Ascomycota
- Class: Arthoniomycetes
- Order: Arthoniales
- Family: Roccellaceae
- Genus: Halographis; Kohlm. & Volkm.-Kohlm.

Type species
- Halographis runica Kohlm. & Volkm.-Kohlm.

Genus of fungi

Halographis is a genus of lichenized fungi in the family Roccellaceae; according to the 2007 Outline of Ascomycota, the placement in this family is uncertain. A monotypic genus, it contains the single species Halographis runica described in 1988.
