= Dirinastrum =

Scientific classification
- Domain: Eukaryota
- Kingdom: Fungi
- Division: Ascomycota
- Class: Arthoniomycetes
- Order: Arthoniales
- Family: Roccellaceae
- Genus: Dirinastrum; Müll.Arg. (1893)

Type species
- Dirinastrum australiense Müll.Arg. (1893)

Genus of lichens

Dirinastrum is a lichenized genus of fungi in the family Roccellaceae.
