= Streimannia =

Scientific classification
- Kingdom: Fungi
- Division: Ascomycota
- Class: Arthoniomycetes
- Order: Arthoniales
- Family: Roccellaceae
- Genus: Streimannia; G.Thor

Type species
- Streimannia varieseptata G.Thor

Genus of fungi

Streimannia is a genus of lichenized fungi in the family Roccellaceae. A monotypic genus, it contains the single species Streimannia varieseptata. The genus was circumscribed by Göran Thor in Opera Bot. vol.103 on page 84 in 1990.

The genus name of Streimannia is in honour of Vale Heinar Streimann (1938–2001), who was an (Estonian)-Australian botanist (Mycology and Bryology). He worked for the forestry commission in Papua-New Guinea and also in the Botanical Garden in Canberra. He undertook post-graduate studies on Papillaria with Helen P. Ramsay at the University of New South Wales.
