= Pseudolecanactis =

Scientific classification
- Domain: Eukaryota
- Kingdom: Fungi
- Division: Ascomycota
- Class: Arthoniomycetes
- Order: Arthoniales
- Family: Roccellaceae
- Genus: Pseudolecanactis; Zahlbr. (1907)

Type species
- Pseudolecanactis filicicola Zahlbr. (1907)

Genus of fungi

Pseudolecanactis is a genus of lichenized fungi in the family Roccellaceae; according to the 2007 Outline of Ascomycota, the placement in this family is uncertain. A monotypic genus, it contains the single species Pseudolecanactis filicicola.
