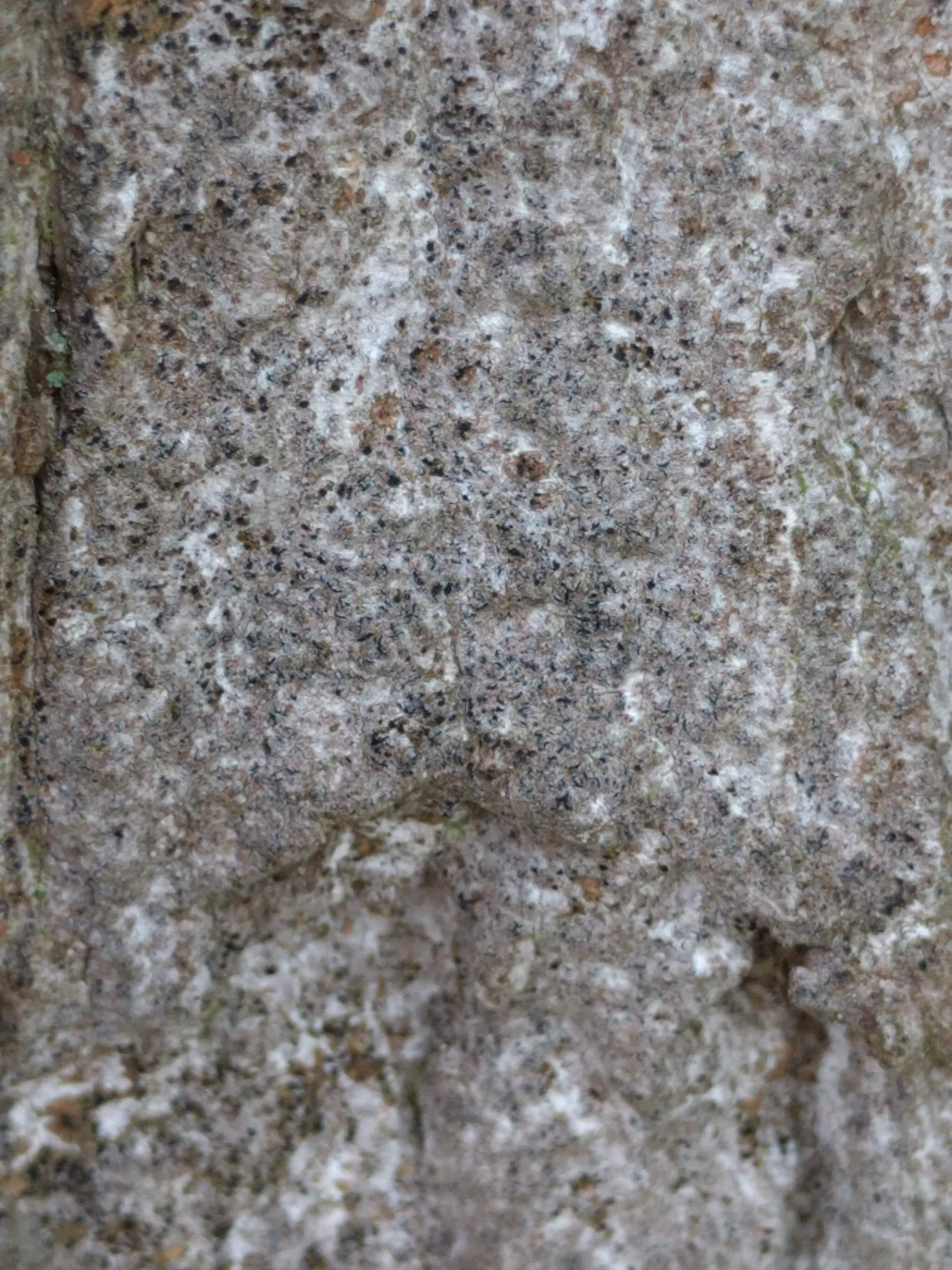
- Pseudoschismatomma rufescens in the Netherlands

Scientific classification
- Kingdom: Fungi
- Division: Ascomycota
- Class: Arthoniomycetes
- Order: Arthoniales
- Family: Roccellaceae
- Genus: Pseudoschismatomma; Ertz & Tehler (2014)
- Species: P. rufescens

Binomial name
- Pseudoschismatomma rufescens (Pers.) Ertz & Tehler (2014)

Synonyms
- List: Opegrapha rufescens Pers. (1794); Lichen siderellus Ach. (1799); Opegrapha siderella var. rufescens (Pers.) Ach. (1810); Opegrapha atra var. rufescens (Pers.) Schaer. (1836); Opegrapha herpetica var. rufescens (Pers.) Mudd (1861); Lichen herpeticus Ach. (1799); Opegrapha herpetica (Ach.) Ach. (1803); Hysterina herpetica (Ach.) Gray (1821); Graphis herpetica (Ach.) Spreng. (1827); Graphis varia var. herpetica (Ach.) Branth & Rostr. (1869); Opegrapha rufescens f. herpetica (Ach.) J.Nowak (1983); Opegrapha siderella (Ach.) Ach. (1803); Opegrapha rufescens var. siderella (Ach.) Lam. (1816); Opegrapha varia var. siderella (Ach.) D.Dietr. (1832); Graphis insculpta var. herpetica Fürnr. (1839); Opegrapha herpetica var. siderella (Ach.) Rabenh. (1845); Opegrapha atra var. siderella (Ach.) Tuck. (1848); Opegrapha vulgata var. siderella (Ach.) Nyl. (1857); Opegrapha rimalis var. fuscata Turner ex Ach. (1810); Opegrapha herpetica var. fuscata (Turner ex Ach.) Schaer. (1850); Opegrapha herpetica f. fuscata (Turner ex Ach.) Zahlbr. (1923); Opegrapha rufescens f. fuscata (Turner ex Ach.) J.Nowak (1983); Opegrapha rubella var. subocellata Ach. (1810); Opegrapha herpetica var. subocellata (Ach.) Ach. (1814); Opegrapha herpetica f. subocellata (Ach.) Ach. (1814); Opegrapha subocellata (Ach.) Hepp (1824); Graphis subocellata (Ach.) Spreng. (1827); Opegrapha rufescens f. subocellata (Ach.) Schaer. (1836); Opegrapha rufescens var. subocellata (Ach.) Schaer. (1836); Opegrapha herpetica f. rubella Flot. (1820); Opegrapha rufescens f. rubella (Flot.) Grummann (1963); Opegrapha herpetica var. furcata Chaub. (1821); Graphis insculpta var. periblastetica Wallr. (1831); Opegrapha rufescens var. fuscata Schaer. (1836); Opegrapha herpetica f. arthonoidea (Schaer.) Schaer. (1850); Opegrapha rufescens var. arthonioidea Schaer. (1850); Opegrapha herpetica var. arthonioidea (Schaer.) Schaer. (1850); Opegrapha bullata f. arthonioidea (Schaer.) Eitner (1911); Opegrapha atra f. heteromorpha Stizenb. (1865); Opegrapha chevallieri f. heteromorpha (Stizenb.) Hepp ex Nyl. (1873); Opegrapha saxicola f. heteromorpha (Stizenb.) Leight. (1879); Opegrapha lithyrga var. heteromorpha (Stizenb.) Boistel (1903); Opegrapha calcarea f. heteromorpha (Stizenb.) A.L.Sm. (1911); Opegrapha calcarea f. heleromorpha (Stizenb.) A.L.Sm. (1926); Opegrapha calcarea var. heteromorpha (Stizenb.) Watson (1935); Opegrapha contexta Stirt. (1874)

= Pseudoschismatomma =

Species of lichen

Pseudoschismatomma is a monotypic fungal genus in the family Roccellaceae. It contains the single species Pseudoschismatomma rufescens, a corticolous (bark-dwelling), crustose lichen. The species was originally described in 1794 but was reclassified into its own genus in 2014 following DNA analysis that revealed it was distinct from similar-looking lichens. This inconspicuous lichen forms a very thin, olive to reddish-brown crust on tree bark and is easily overlooked due to its paint-like appearance that blends closely with its substrate. It is known from temperate Europe, with confirmed records from Belgium, though it probably occurs more widely in the region on the bark of broad-leaved trees in humid woodland and parkland settings.

== Taxonomy ==
Pseudoschismatomma rufescens was first described in 1794 by Christiaan Hendrik Persoon as Opegrapha rufescens. Pseudoschismatomma was circumscribed in 2014 by Damien Ernst and Anders Tehler, following molecular phylogenetic analysis and revision of the Roccellaceae. The genus name alludes to its similarity with genus Schismatomma, particularly S. graphidioides. It differs from this species in having a distinct brown true exciple.

== Description ==
Pseudoschismatomma rufescens grows as a very thin, paint-like crust (a crustose thallus) that has no true outer skin (ecorticate). The surface is smooth to finely cracked and varies from dull olive through reddish-brown, blending so closely with its bark substrate that the lichen is easy to overlook. A filamentous orange alga of the genus Trentepohlia supplies the photosynthetic partner, its threads running through the fungal matrix like fine wiring. No specialised powdery propagules (soredia) or other vegetative outgrowths are produced, so the lichen relies on its spore-bearing structures for reproduction.

These fruit bodies are miniature slits called lirellae—oblong, sometimes slightly curved fissures only 0.3–0.6 mm long and about 0.1–0.2 mm wide. They start out flush with the thallus but may sit on a tiny cushion of lichen tissue as they mature. The exposed interior (the hymenial disc) is dull black and never dusted with a pale bloom (epruinose), yet a delicate whitish rim derived from the thallus often frames each slit. Beneath the surface, the true cup wall (excipulum) is dark brown, unusually thin, and shows no colour reaction when touched with potassium hydroxide solution (K–). The spore layer houses eight ascospores per sac (ascus) together with a mesh of slender support filaments (paraphysoids). Spores are colourless, gently curved, divided by three internal walls (septa), and measure 16–27 × 3–5 μm; unlike many former Opegrapha relatives they lack the gelatinous coat that aids buoyancy in water. Tiny flask-like pycnidia generate rod-shaped conidia 4–8 × 1–2 μm that may serve as another means of dispersal. Standard spot-tests are negative and thin-layer chromatography detects no secondary metabolites, a chemically silent profile that, together with the slender lirellae and unsheathed spores, helps separate Pseudoschismatomma from superficially similar genera such as Schismatomma and the carbon-walled Gyrographa.

== Habitat and distribution ==
Pseudoschismatomma rufescens forms a very thin, olive- to red-brown crust that clings tightly to tree bark. Because the thallus has no protective cortex, it prospers in sheltered, rather humid nooks where the substrate does not dry out too abruptly. Its green algal partner (a filamentous Trentepohlia) tints freshly moistened patches a muted orange-brown and fuels photosynthesis even in the subdued light beneath a woodland canopy. Field observations indicate that the lichen settles chiefly on the smooth bark of mature, broad-leaved trees, especially where a light film of nutrients runs down the trunk after rain—conditions that temperate, lowland woods and old parkland readily provide.

All sequenced collections analysed by Ertz and Tehler were gathered in Belgium, each specimen growing on bark at low elevations. Although the molecular survey documents the species only from that country, its original description dates to the late eighteenth century, implying a longer—yet still poorly mapped—presence in temperate Europe. Given how inconspicuous this crust can be and its past confusion with superficially similar Opegrapha species, the authors suggest that it is reasonable to expect further records from neighbouring regions once targeted searches are undertaken.
