= Erythrodecton =

Scientific classification
- Domain: Eukaryota
- Kingdom: Fungi
- Division: Ascomycota
- Class: Arthoniomycetes
- Order: Arthoniales
- Family: Roccellaceae
- Genus: Erythrodecton; G.Thor (1991)

Type species
- Erythrodecton granulatum (Mont.) G.Thor (1991)

Species
- E. granulatum E. malacum

Genus of lichens

Erythrodecton is a genus of two species of lichen-forming fungi in the family Roccellaceae. The genus was circumscribed in 1991 by Swedish botanist Göran Thor, with E. granulatum assigned as the type species.
