= Lecanographa amylacea =

Scientific classification
- Domain: Eukaryota
- Kingdom: Fungi
- Division: Ascomycota
- Class: Arthoniomycetes
- Order: Arthoniales
- Family: Lecanographaceae
- Genus: Lecanographa
- Species: L. amylacea

Binomial name
- Lecanographa amylacea (Ehrh. ex Pers.) Egea & Torrente (1994)

Synonyms
- Lichen amylaceus Ehrh. ex Pers. (1794) (basionym)

Species of lichen

Lecanographa amylacea is a species of lichen belonging to the family Lecanographaceae.

It is native to Europe and Northern America.
