= Roccellina =

Scientific classification
- Domain: Eukaryota
- Kingdom: Fungi
- Division: Ascomycota
- Class: Arthoniomycetes
- Order: Arthoniales
- Family: Roccellaceae
- Genus: Roccellina; Darb. (1898)

Type species
- Roccellina condensata Darb. (1898)

Species
- see text

Synonyms
- Lobodirina Follmann (1968)

Genus of lichen

Roccellina is a genus of lichen-forming fungi in the family Roccellaceae.

== Taxonomy ==
The genus was circumscribed in 1898 by British botanist Otto Vernon Darbishire with Roccellina condensata as the type. At that time, only species. A year earlier, Darbishire published the genus Roccellaria to contain the species Roccellaria intricata. More than a century later, molecular phylogenetic analysis showed that this species is nested in the polyphyletic genus Roccellina. Because Roccellaria was published earlier than Roccellina, the name Roccellaria has priority, threatening to disrupt the nomenclature of all the Roccellina species. To avoid this nomenclatural instability, Swedish botanist Anders Tehler made a proposal to formally conserve the name Roccellina over Roccellaria; the proposal was later accepted by the Nomenclature Committee for Fungi in 2010.

== Species ==
- Roccellina arboricola (Follmann) Aptroot & Schumm (2011)
- Roccellina capensis Tehler (1983)
- Roccellina condensata Darb. (1898)
- Roccellina corrugata Follmann (2001)
- Roccellina cumingiana (Mont.) Tehler (2007)
- Roccellina exspectata Tehler (1983)
- Roccellina hypomecha (Ach.) Tehler (2007)
- Roccellina leptothalla (Malme) Ertz & Tehler (2014)
- Roccellina mollis (Hampe) Tehler (2007)
- Roccellina ochracea Follmann (2008)
- Roccellina portentosa (Mont.) Tehler (2007)
