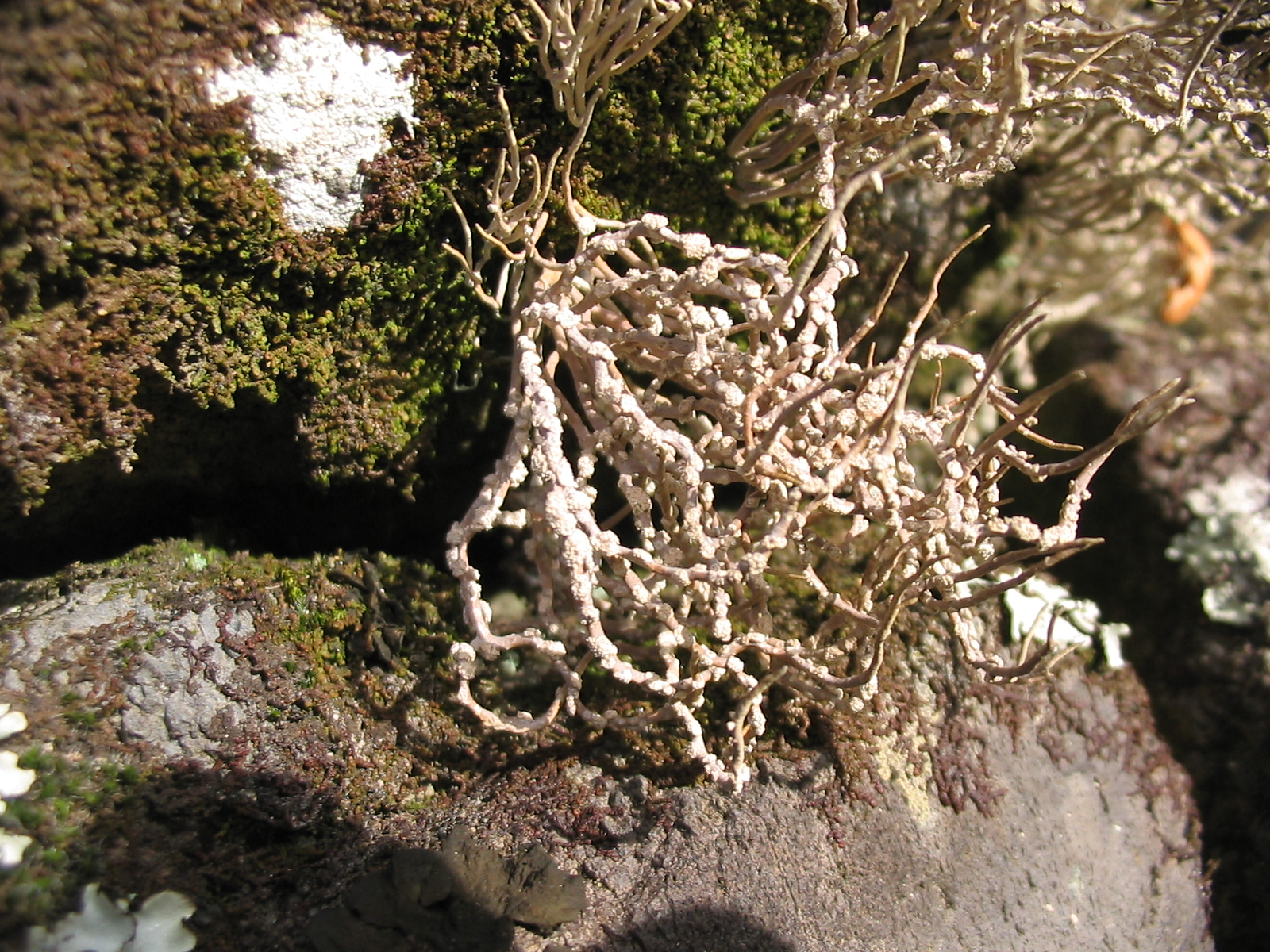
- Roccella fuciformis

Scientific classification
- Domain: Eukaryota
- Kingdom: Fungi
- Division: Ascomycota
- Class: Arthoniomycetes
- Order: Arthoniales
- Family: Roccellaceae
- Genus: Roccella; DC. (1805)

Type species
- Roccella fuciformis (L.) DC. (1805)

Synonyms
- Thamnium Vent. (1799); Nemaria Navàs (1909); Roccellopsis Elenkin (1929); Roccellomyces E.A.Thomas ex Cif. & Tomas. (1953)

= Roccella (lichen) =

Genus of lichens in the family Roccellaceae

Roccella is a genus of 23 species of lichens in the family Roccellaceae. The genus was circumscribed by Swiss botanist Augustin Pyramus de Candolle in 1805, with Roccella fuciformis as the type species.

== Description ==
Roccella presents a fruticose (shrub-like), thallus that is either erect or pendulous (hanging) with sparse dichotomous branching. The main and terminal branches, varying in shape from flattened to rounded (terete), typically measure 2 to 5 mm (up to 10 mm) in thickness and 5 to 15 cm in length. These branches has colours ranging from creamy white-greyish to greyish-brown and have surfaces that are either smooth or wrinkled, with some being sparsely pruinose (powdery) or lacking pruina (epruinose). Soredia, reproductive propagules for asexual reproduction, are present in many species within the genus.

The cortex of Roccella lichens is made of hyphae that are arranged in an anticlinal manner and are about 40 to 70 μm thick. The medulla (the inner layer) is loosely structured above, having a byssoid (fibrous) or chalky texture, and below it becomes plectenchymatous (tightly packed cells) near the basal plate (holdfast) area, often showing a (yellowish) brown colouration. These lichens primarily associate with the photobiont Trentepohlia, with no secondary photobiont present. They attach to surfaces using holdfasts, including a hypomedulla which usually appears brown to dark brown, sometimes with a yellowish tinge.

The ascomata (spore-producing structures) of Roccella are in the form of apothecia, lateral, and circular in outline. They can be either immersed in the thallus or sessile with a constricted base and can reach up to 2.5 mm in diameter. The disc of the apothecia is exposed, white, and features a rimose, pruinose layer. The exciple (the outer layer of the ascomata) initially contains algae and a cortex, but over time, the algae may be displaced, and the cortex eroded. The proper exciple forms a thin parathecium and is sometimes inconspicuous.

The epithecium (upper layer of the ascomata) is about 40 to 50 μm high, brown, with intertwined paraphysoids (supporting structures in the hymenium) that are sparsely branched. The hymenium (spore-bearing layer) itself is 70 to 90 μm high. Paraphysoids within the hymenium are sparsely branched, hyaline (translucent), and measure 1 to 2 μm in diameter. The hypothecium (layer beneath the hymenium) is distinct, dark brown, carbonaceous, and does not extend into the medulla. The asci (spore-bearing cells) are clavate (club-shaped), measuring 60 to 85 by 12 to 14 μm. Ascospores are fusiform (spindle-shaped), curved, smooth, contains three septa (internal partitions), and are hyaline.

Conidiomata (asexual reproductive structures) are pycnidial (flask-shaped), solitary, immersed in the thallus, and black, measuring about 0.1 mm in diameter. The conidia (asexual spores) are filiform (thread-like), curved, measuring 16 to 21 by less than 1 μm. In terms of chemistry, Roccella lichens contain orcinol and β-orcinol depsides, as well as aliphatic acids. Roccella lichens grow on rock or on bark.

== Species ==
- Roccella albida Tehler (2009)
- Roccella bajasurensis Tehler (2009)
- Roccella botrytis B.Werner (2000)
- Roccella colonii Follmann (2001)
- Roccella elisabethae Tehler (2004)
- Roccella floreana B.Werner (2000)
- Roccella floribrassica B.Werner (2000)
- Roccella fuciformis (L.) DC. (1805)
- Roccella fusca B.Werner (2000)
- Roccella galapagoensis Follmann (1968)
- Roccella geniculata Follmann & B.Werner (2000) – Galápagos Islands
- Roccella glebaria B.Werner & Follmann (2000) – Galápagos Islands
- Roccella gracilis Bory (1828)
- Roccella hertelii Mies & M.Schultz (2004)
- Roccella incurvata B.Werner (2000)
- Roccella kappeniana Follmann & B.Werner (2000) – Galápagos Islands
- Roccella maderensis (J.Steiner) Follmann (1993)
- Roccella minuta Tehler (2010)
- Roccella montagnei Bél. (1834)
- Roccella phycopsioides Tehler (2010)
- Roccella phycopsis Ach. (1810)
- Roccella sanctae-helenae Aptroot & Schumm (2011)
- Roccella stipitata B.Werner & Follmann (2000) – Galápagos Islands
- Roccella tinctoria DC. (1805)
- Roccella translucida Follmann & B.Werner (2001)
