= Psoromic acid =

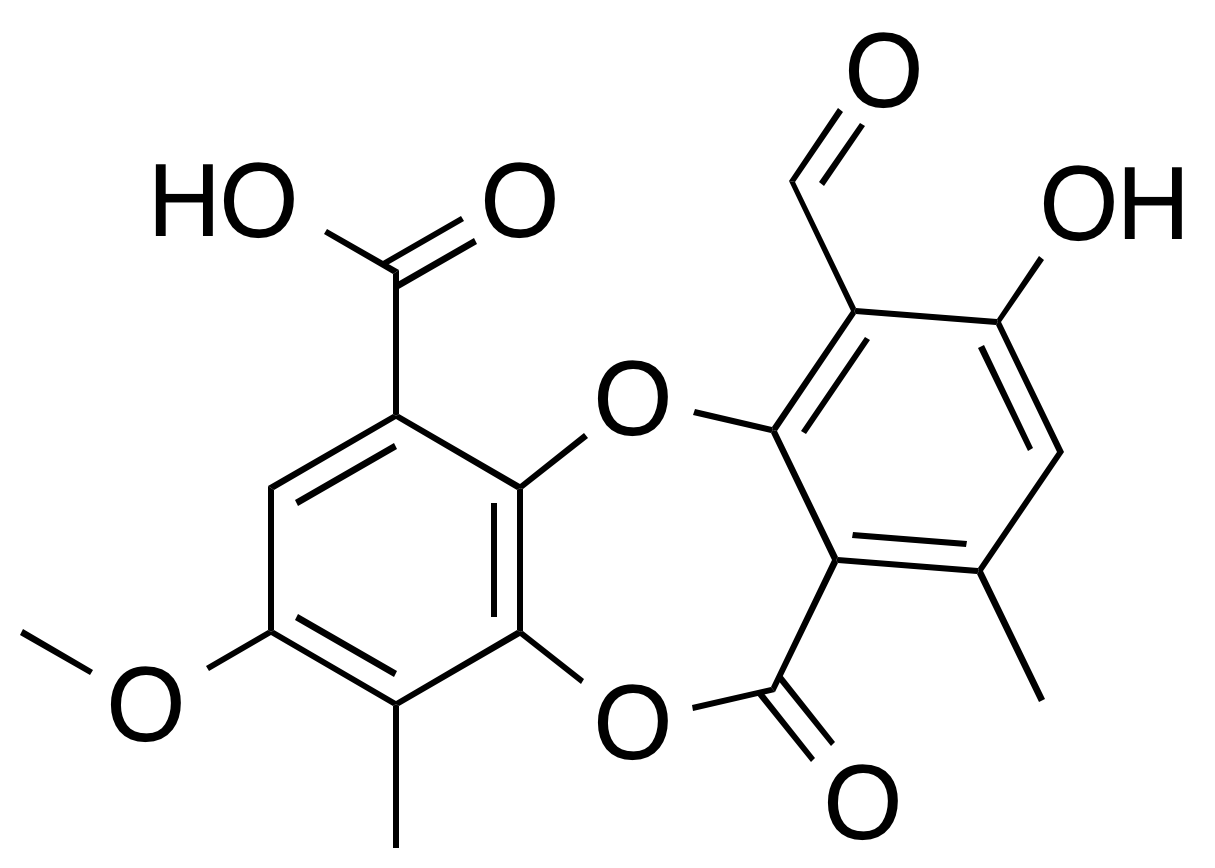

Names
- IUPAC name 10-Formyl-9-hydroxy-3-methoxy-4,7-dimethyl-6-oxobenzo[b][1,4]benzodioxepine-1-carboxylic acid
- Other names: 4-Formyl-3-hydroxy-8-methoxy-1,9-dimethyl-11-oxo-11H-dibenzo[b,e][1,4]dioxepin-6-carboxylic acid; Parellic acid; NSC 92186

Identifiers
CAS Number	7299-11-8
3D model (JSmol)	Interactive image
ChEBI	CHEBI:92074
ChEMBL	ChEMBL176570
ChemSpider	22185
PubChem CID	23725
UNII	7SWA85EH4H
CompTox Dashboard (EPA)	DTXSID70223264
- InChI: InChI=1S/C18H14O8/c1-7-4-11(20)10(6-19)15-13(7)18(23)26-14-8(2)12(24-3)5-9(17(21)22)16(14)25-15/h4-6,20H,1-3H3,(H,21,22) Key: FUCWJKJZOHOLEO-UHFFFAOYSA-N
- SMILES: CC1=C(OC)C=C(C(O)=O)C(OC2=C3C(C)=CC(O)=C2C=O)=C1OC3=O

Properties
Chemical formula	C_{18}H_{14}O_{8}
Molar mass	358.302 g·mol^{−1}
- Except where otherwise noted, data are given for materials in their standard state (at 25 °C [77 °F], 100 kPa). Infobox references

Psoromic acid is a β-orcinol depsidone with the molecular formula C_{18}H_{14}O_{8}. Its depsidone structure was conclusively confirmed by spectroscopic and degradative studies in 1976. The compound is most commonly found in Antarctic lichens and has demonstrated antiviral properties in laboratory studies. The first total synthesis of this lichen product was reported in 1979.

== Occurrence ==
Psoromic acid is most commonly associated with antarctic lichens. It has been shown to also be present in Sarcogyne similis, a lichen that is widespread in North America.

== Bioactivity ==
Psoromic acid inhibits herpes simplex viruses type 1 and type 2. Furthermore, it inhibits the enzyme Rab geranylgeranyltransferase (RabGGTase).

== Structure elucidation ==
Psoromic acid was long thought to be a β-orcinol depsidone, yet its thermal breakdown into phthalic anhydride sowed doubt and even led one author to suggest a "grisan" skeleton instead. Siegfried Huneck and Melvyn Sargent's 1976 reinvestigation settled the matter. Using infrared bands characteristic of a depsidone carbonyl (1740 cm⁻¹) and an intramolecularly hydrogen-bonded aldehyde (1640 cm⁻¹), together with supporting UV, NMR and mass-spectrometric data, they confirmed that the natural product matches the dibenzo-dioxepine framework originally proposed by Yasuhiko Asahina's group. They also synthesised a diaryl-ether degradation product that contained all 18 carbon atoms of psoromic acid, further cementing the assignment.

The same study illuminated two quirks of the molecule's reactivity that are still mentioned in synthetic work. First, base-catalysed methanolysis can trigger a Smiles rearrangement, generating isomeric products that may mislead degradation analyses; the authors advised caution when using this common step. Second, they explained why pyrolysis forms phthalic anhydride: the depsidone ring can transiently open and re-close to a grisan-type structure before fragmenting.

== Total synthesis ==
In 1979 Tony Sala and Melvyn Sargent disclosed the first total synthesis of psoromic acid. Their strategy began with two substituted aromatic fragments: a brominated B-ring and a phenolic A-ring. The fragments were joined by an Ullmann reaction to give a diaryl ether, but only after the sensitive phenol had been masked as an isopropyl ether—a protecting group chosen because, unlike benzyl ethers, it survives the strong Lewis acid conditions later needed for formylation and ring closure. Tin(IV) chloride-promoted formylation at the ortho position, followed by boron trichloride treatment, simultaneously removed the isopropyl group, deacetylated an intermediate and induced lactonisation to deliver methyl O-methyl-hypopsoromate, a fully formed depsidone skeleton that still carried a protected phenolic site and a methyl ester.

Late-stage tailoring converted this scaffold into the natural product. Selective photobromination of the 4-methyl group, followed by hydrolysis, furnished a hydroxymethyl derivative that was smoothly oxidised with pyridinium chlorochromate to the aldehyde methyl O-methyl-psoromate. Boron trichloride then removed the remaining O-methyl, giving methyl psoromate. Finally, exhaustive treatment with lithium iodide in hot hexamethylphosphoramide cleaved the methyl ester, yielding psoromic acid in analytically identical form to the lichen metabolite.
