= Roccellic acid =

Names
- IUPAC name (2R,3S)-2-Dodecyl-3-methylbutanedioic acid
- Other names Rocellic acid

Identifiers
CAS Number	29838-46-8
3D model (JSmol)	Interactive image
ChEBI	CHEBI:144218
ChEMBL	ChEMBL3138662
ChemSpider	9624298
PubChem CID	11449446
UNII	AEL38V7F67
CompTox Dashboard (EPA)	DTXSID90952266
- InChI: InChI=1S/C17H32O4/c1-3-4-5-6-7-8-9-10-11-12-13-15(17(20)21)14(2)16(18)19/h14-15H,3-13H2,1-2H3,(H,18,19)(H,20,21)/t14-,15+/m0/s1 Key: CADNMISJDLVPCK-LSDHHAIUSA-N
- SMILES: CCCCCCCCCCCC[C@H]([C@H](C)C(=O)O)C(=O)O

Properties
Chemical formula	C_{17}H_{32}O_{4}
Molar mass	300.439 g·mol^{−1}
- Except where otherwise noted, data are given for materials in their standard state (at 25 °C [77 °F], 100 kPa). Infobox references

Roccellic acid is a chemical compound with the molecular formula C_{17}H_{32}O_{4}. It was first described as a chemical constituent of the lichen Roccella tinctoria by Friedrich Heeren, sometime before 1830. He sent a purified sample to Liebig, who analyzed them in the fall of 1830. It has since been identified in a variety of other lichens including Roccella montagnei, Lobodirina cerebriformes, Lobodirina mahuiana, and Dirina lutosa, among others.

Several laboratory syntheses of roccellic acid have been reported.

== Related compounds ==
Toensbergianic acid is a stereoisomer of roccellic acid and angardianic acid has been reported to be closely related, but its exact chemical structure is undetermined.
