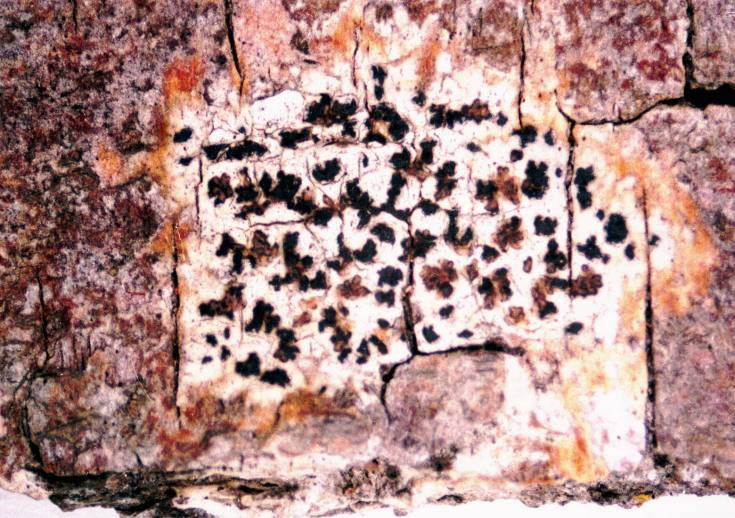
- Arthonia radiata magnified 9X, growing on Red Oak bark

Scientific classification
- Domain: Eukaryota
- Kingdom: Fungi
- Division: Ascomycota
- Subdivision: Pezizomycotina
- (unranked): Leotiomyceta
- (unranked): Dothideomyceta
- Class: Arthoniomycetes; O.E.Erikss. & Winka (1997)

Orders
- Arthoniales; Lichenostigmatales

= Arthoniomycetes =

Class of fungi

Arthoniomycetes are a class of ascomycete fungi. It includes two orders: Arthoniales and Lichenostigmatales. Most of the taxa in these orders are tropical and subtropical lichens.

== Systematics ==
Phylogenetic analysis supports the monophyly of this class. Dothideomycetes is a sister group.

== Characteristics ==
Taxa have apothecia, cup- or saucer- shaped ascoma in which the hymenium is exposed at maturity. These apothecia are bitunicate - with clearly differentiated inner and outer walls.
