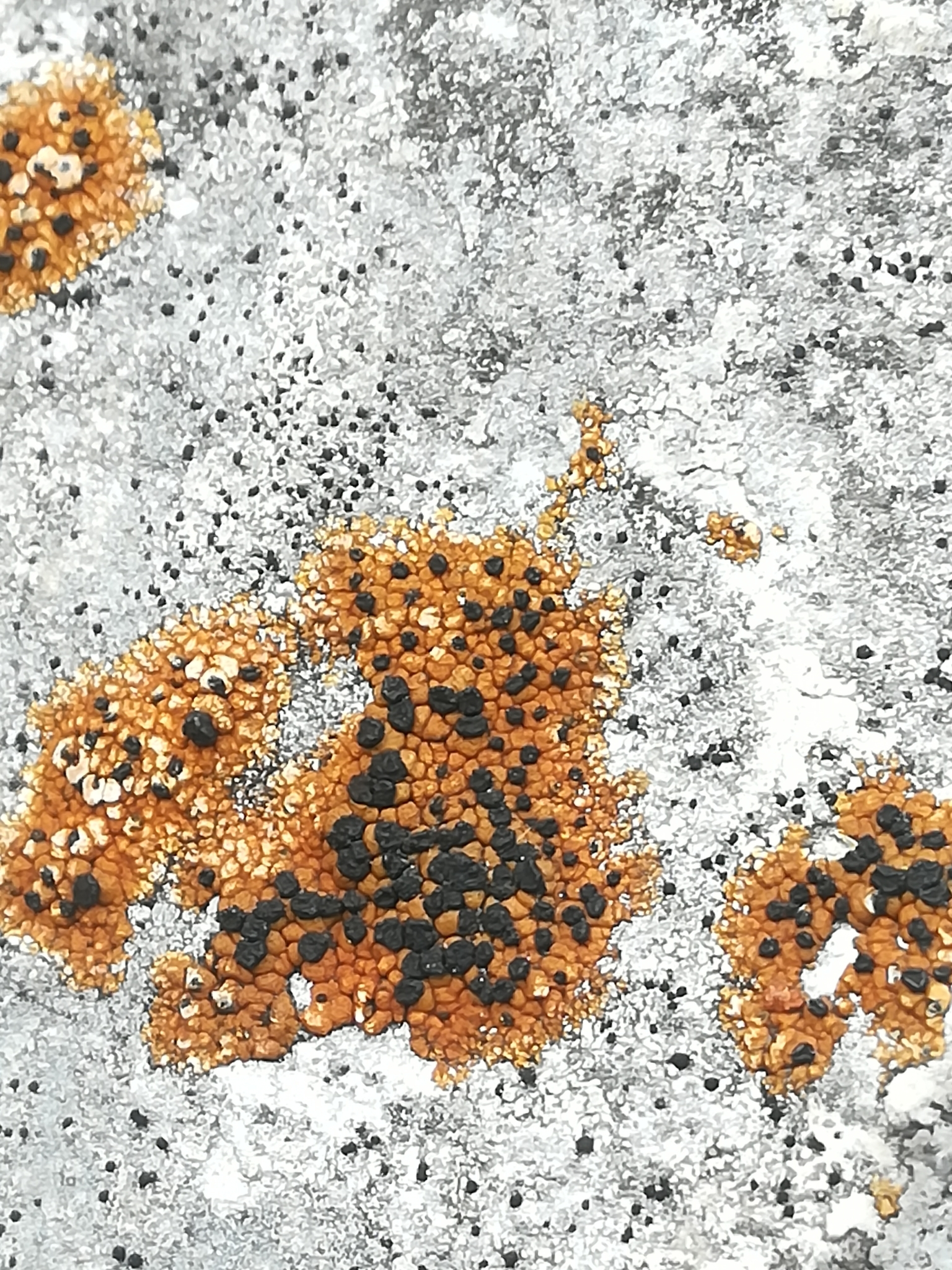
- photographed in Fagáceas del Noreste de México, Nuevo León, México

Scientific classification
- Kingdom: Fungi
- Division: Ascomycota
- Class: Arthoniomycetes
- Order: Arthoniales
- Family: Lecanographaceae
- Genus: Phoebus; R.C.Harris & Ladd (2007)
- Species: P. hydrophobius

Binomial name
- Phoebus hydrophobius R.C.Harris & Ladd (2007)

= Phoebus hydrophobius =

Species of lichen

Phoebus hydrophobius is the single lichen species in the fungal genus Phoebus, which is placed in the family Lecanographaceae (order Arthoniales). This distinctive lichen was discovered in 2007 in the Ozark region of the central United States and later found in limestone areas of northeastern Mexico. It forms orange-brown crusty patches on sun-exposed rock faces and can be identified by its intense violet-black color reaction when treated with potassium hydroxide solution, a standard chemical spot test.

== Taxonomy ==
Genus Phoebus contains only one species, Phoebus hydrophobius, found in the Ozarks of the central United States, and described as new to science in 2007. When erecting the genus, Harris and Ladd compared its placodioid, intensely K-positive thallus with that of certain orange members of the Roccellaceae and provisionally placed the new genus in that family. Subsequent check-lists that lacked DNA evidence transferred Phoebus to "Arthoniales genera incertae sedis", reflecting uncertainty over its deeper relationships; as of 2025, it is still classified in this way by Species Fungorum.

A three-locus phylogeny (nuLSU + mtSSU + RPB2) published in 2020 resolved the species within Lecanographaceae, as an isolated lineage that is sister to a clade containing Phacographa spp., two "Opegrapha" species and Simonyella variegata. This placement makes Phoebus the eighth confirmed genus in the family and shows that its placodioid growth form evolved independently of the superficially similar genus Roccellina. The study also extended the known range of P. hydrophobius to six xerophytic limestone localities in the Sierra Madre Oriental of Coahuila and Nuevo León, Mexico, demonstrating that the species is not restricted to the Ozarks.

== Description ==
The thallus of Phoebus hydrophobius forms an orange-brown crust made up of small, slightly swollen polygonal blocks (areoles) that coalesce into rough patches up to about a millimetre thick. When a drop of potassium hydroxide solution (the standard "K" spot test) is placed on the surface, those blocks turn a deep violet-black, betraying the presence of anthraquinone-like pigments. In section the outer skin (cortex) is a firm, cartilaginous layer of tightly interwoven, gelatinised fungal threads; above it sits a thin, jelly-like epicortex tinged the same orange as the surface. Unusually, the white medulla—the cottony interior of the lichen—occurs both above and below the green algal band, giving the thallus a double-decker construction. The algal partner is Trentepohlia, a group of orange-pigmented, sausage-shaped cells that typically favour humid, sheltered rock faces.

Black, slit-to-irregularly rounded fruiting bodies (opegraphoid apothecia) erupt on or between the areoles. They start flush with the surface but soon become slightly elevated, with a coarse black rim and, at times, a dusting of orange powder. Inside, a dark brown hypothecium underlies a 100-μm-tall spore-bearing layer (hymenium). The asci each contain eight ascospores arranged in two rows; the spores are colourless at first, surrounded by a gelatinous halo, divided by three cross-walls, and measure roughly 16–20 × 5–6.5 μm before maturing to a pale brown and developing a roughened coat. No asexual propagules (pycnidia) have been observed. This combination of an intensely K-positive orange crust, Trentepohlia photobiont, and opegraphoid apothecia separates Phoebus from superficially similar orange rock-dwelling lichens such as Caloplaca.

== Habitat and distribution ==
Phoebus hydrophobius was originally known only from dolomitic and other carbonate bluffs in the Missouri–Arkansas Ozark Highlands, where the type was collected in 2007. Targeted surveys and molecular work later revealed the species on six additional limestone outcrops in the Sierra Madre Oriental of north-eastern Mexico (one site in Coahuila, five in Nuevo León), showing that its range bridges the southern United States and northern Mexico rather than being Ozark-restricted.

Across this expanded range the lichen occupies sun-exposed, xeric faces of hard limestone—both vertical canyon walls and sloping pavements—within xerophytic and piedmont scrub vegetation at roughly 900–1,520 m (2,950–4,990 ft) elevation. It often grows intermixed with other calcicolous crusts such as Alyxoria sierramadrensis and various Caloplaca, Buellia and Squamulea species, and appears locally common at several Mexican sites. Most Nuevo León populations lie on heavily visited mountains around Monterrey, where urban expansion, quarrying of limestone, and chronic industrial air pollution pose potential threats to the species' limited habitat.
