= Huriella flakusii =

Scientific classification
- Kingdom: Fungi
- Division: Ascomycota
- Class: Lecanoromycetes
- Order: Teloschistales
- Family: Teloschistaceae
- Genus: Huriella
- Species: H. flakusii

Binomial name
- Huriella flakusii Wilk (2020)
- Holotype: Valle del Colca, Peru

Species of lichen-forming fungus

Huriella flakusii is a species of saxicolous (rock-dwelling) crustose lichen in the family Teloschistaceae. It is found in the Colca Canyon region of southern Peru.

== Taxonomy ==
The species was described in 2020 from semi-desert localities in the Arequipa Region, and the epithet honors the Polish lichenologist Adam Flakus. DNA data place it in the subfamily Xanthorioideae (Amundsenia–Squamulea group), as sister to Huriella loekoesiana from South Korea.

== Description ==
The thallus is orange and squamulose (made of small scales), sometimes strongly reduced, and it lacks soredia and isidia. Apothecia (fruiting bodies) are abundant and often crowded together, typically 0.2–1.0 mm wide, with a reddish disc and a double margin. The thallus and apothecial tissues react K+ (purple) due to anthraquinone pigments. Ascospores are polarilocular and broadly ellipsoid, measuring 10–15 × 5.0–9.5 μm with a septum that is 2–4 μm. Pycnidia are immersed in the thallus and produce bacilliform conidia 3–4 × 1 μm.

== Habitat and distribution ==
Huriella flakusii grows on siliceous rock in open, arid montane habitats at about 3,310–3,500 m (10,860–11,480 ft) elevation, and is known only from a few collections near Achoma and Cabanaconde in the Colca Canyon area.
