= Alyxoria sierramadrensis =

Scientific classification
- Kingdom: Fungi
- Division: Ascomycota
- Class: Arthoniomycetes
- Order: Arthoniales
- Family: Lecanographaceae
- Genus: Alyxoria
- Species: A. sierramadrensis

Binomial name
- Alyxoria sierramadrensis Ertz, Huereca, Salcedo-Martínez & Tehler (2020)
- Holotype: route to Pico Perico, Nuevo León, Mexico

Species of lichen-forming fungus

Alyxoria sierramadrensis is a species of saxicolous (rock-dwelling) crustose lichen in the family Lecanographaceae. The species is known from six localities in the Mexican states of Coahuila and Nuevo León, where it grows on exposed limestone outcrops at elevations between roughly 800 and 1,500 m (2,600 and 4,900 ft). It occurs in semi-arid scrubland communities with scattered oaks, often alongside other lime-loving lichens. Many populations fall within the expanding Monterrey metropolitan area, where limestone quarrying and air pollution pose potential threats.

== Taxonomy ==
Alyxoria sierramadrensis was formally described as a new species in 2020 by Damien Ertz, Alejandro Huereca, Sergio Salcedo-Martínez, and Anders Tehler. It was shown by molecular analyses to belong in the genus Alyxoria, where it falls within the Alyxoria ochrocheila group as sister to A. subelevata. This placement is unexpected because most species of Alyxoria have thin crustose thalli or are lichenicolous, whereas A. sierramadrensis has a conspicuous rosette-like thallus with a pale, pruinose surface and an orange medulla rich in anthraquinone pigments. The specific epithet refers to the Sierra Madre Oriental, the mountain range that spans its known distribution and includes the type locality on Cerro de las Mitras near Monterrey.

== Description ==
The thallus of Alyxoria sierramadrensis forms patches about 1–3 cm (0.39–1.18 in) across, composed of convex, elongate lobes or areoles whose pale brown surface is usually masked by a dense white pruina. In section it shows a well-developed upper cortex, a layer of orange-stained medulla containing anthraquinones, and a dark, loosely hyphal lower surface, with a trentepohlioid green alga as photobiont. The black ascomata (fruiting bodies) are scattered, rounded to shortly elongated, with a slightly raised margin surrounding a flat, widely exposed disc that is thickly covered in white pruina. Ascospores are hyaline, narrowly oblong to somewhat club-shaped, three-septate, typically 19–23 μm long and 7–9 μm wide, and surrounded by a distinct gelatinous sheath. Chemical tests and thin-layer chromatography reveal several unidentified anthraquinones and UV-fluorescent compounds, and together with the distinctive ascomata and spores these features separate the species from superficially similar placodioid lichens in genera such as Placolecis and Roccellina.

== Habitat and distribution ==
The species grows on exposed limestone outcrops in semi-humid parts of the Sierra Madre Oriental, where it occurs on steep or vertical rock walls within xerophytic and Piedmont scrubland communities that include scattered oaks. It has been recorded from six localities in the Mexican states of Coahuila and Nuevo León, at elevations of roughly 800–1,500 m (2,600–4,900 ft), and often co-occurs with other calcicolous lichens such as Bagliettoa calciseda, Psora pseudorussellii, Squamulea galactophylla, and Xanthopsorella texana. Field observations indicate that Alyxoria sierramadrensis can be locally frequent in suitable habitats, but many populations fall within the rapidly expanding metropolitan area of Monterrey, where quarrying of limestone and poor air quality are ongoing concerns; the authors therefore suggest that similar habitats in neighboring Mexican states and in adjacent Texas should be surveyed to clarify its full range and conservation status.
