= Alyxoria fuscospora =

Scientific classification
- Kingdom: Fungi
- Division: Ascomycota
- Class: Arthoniomycetes
- Order: Arthoniales
- Family: Lecanographaceae
- Genus: Alyxoria
- Species: A. fuscospora

Binomial name
- Alyxoria fuscospora Ertz, Aptroot & M.Cáceres (2014)
- Holotype: Porto Velho, Brazil

Species of lichen

Alyxoria fuscospora is a species of terricolous and corticolous (ground- and bark-dwelling) crustose lichen in the family Lecanographaceae. Originally described from Brazil in 2014, this lichen has since been found to have a pantropical distribution, occurring across Central and South America, Africa, and Southeast Asia. The species is unusual in its habitat preferences, growing both on tree bark and on the soil of termite mounds in primary rainforest environments. It is distinguished from related species by its spores, which turn brown relatively early in their development and are surrounded by a thin gelatinous layer.

== Taxonomy ==
Alyxoria fuscospora was described in 2014 by Damien Ertz, André Aptroot, and Marcela Cáceres. The type was collected from Sítio Ecológico Buriti on Lago Cujubim near Porto Velho (Rondônia, Brazil), on smooth tree bark in primary rainforest.

The authors placed the species in Alyxoria, a genus reinstated for the Opegrapha varia-group, because its fruiting bodies and spore- and ascus-types match that lineage. It is distinguished by three-septate spores with a distinct gelatinous sheath that turn brown relatively early—unlike many Opegrapha (in the loose sense, or s.l.) taxa, where spores only become pale brown when over-mature. Historical material named Opegrapha herbarum (s.l.) corresponds to this species; in contrast, Alyxoria culmigena (the older name for O. herbarum in a strict sense) has spores that darken only when over-ripe. On that basis the authors infer that A. fuscospora is pantropical and commonly corticolous (bark-dwelling).

== Description ==
The thallus (lichen body) forms a continuous, slightly shiny green crust without a contrasting border; its photosynthetic partner is a Trentepohlia-type green alga. Apothecia (the sexual fruiting bodies) are scattered, mostly immersed to just breaking through the surface, and elongate, often branching into short lines; they have a narrow black margin and only a slit-like exposed disc. Internally the apothecial wall is carbonized and thick, and the hymenium shows a weak iodine reaction (hemiamyloid). The internal threads (paraphysoids) are interlinked, and the asci are club-shaped. Ascospores are produced eight per ascus; they are club-shaped (clavate), three-septate, surrounded by a thin gelatinous layer, and turn brown as they mature. No asexual fruiting bodies (pycnidia) were seen. Standard spot tests on the thallus are negative, and thin-layer chromatography detected no secondary metabolites.

== Habitat and distribution ==
The species grows on the soil of termite mounds in primary rainforest (a terricolous habitat) and also on tree bark. It has a pantropical distribution, with records from Brazil (Rondônia), Guatemala, Benin, Gabon, Malaysia, Papua New Guinea, and Thailand.

== See also ==
- List of lichens of Brazil
