= Plectocarpon galapagoense =

Scientific classification
- Domain: Eukaryota
- Kingdom: Fungi
- Division: Ascomycota
- Class: Arthoniomycetes
- Order: Arthoniales
- Family: Lecanographaceae
- Genus: Plectocarpon
- Species: P. galapagoense

Binomial name
- Plectocarpon galapagoense Ertz & Bungartz (2019)

Species of lichen

Plectocarpon galapagoense is a species of lichenicolous fungus in the family Lecanographaceae. Native to the Galápagos Islands, it grows on and within the ascomata and thallus of Sarcographa tricosa, a host lichen species. Although it appears to be a weak parasite, it may cause significant damage to the host lichen's reproductive structures.

== Taxonomy ==
Plectocarpon galapagoense was described by Damien Ertz and Frank Bungartz in 2019. Its species epithet refers to its occurrence in the Galápagos Islands. The holotype specimen was collected by the second author on Pinta Island at an elevation of 615 m (2,018 ft); it was found in a forest of Zanthoxylum fagara with abundant ferns in the understory.

== Description ==
The lichenicolous fungus initially grows immersed within the host lichen, eventually bursting through and appearing as black, star-shaped or rounded structures measuring 1–2 mm in diameter. The surface of the fungus is lirellate to labyrinthiform, with a slit-like hymenial disc. It does not induce galls or produce necrotic areas on the host lichen.

Its asci are somewhat cylindrical to narrowly clavate, with a narrow ocular chamber, and contain 4–8 spores. The ascospores are fusiform and contain two or three septa, initially hyaline but becoming dark brown and granulose as they mature.

=== Similar species ===
While similar to Plectocarpon macaronesiae, P. galapagoense differs in the size of its ascomata, the appearance of its surface, and its host genus. Plectocarpon dirinariae is another similar species but differs in its ascomatal shape and host genus. Plectocarpon aequatoriale, found in Ecuador, has distinctly convex ascomata, longer ascospores, and a different host genus. Opegrapha plectocarpoidea, known from Papua New Guinea, differs in its ascomatal shape, number of spores in its asci, and the exciple that continues below the hymenium.

== Habitat and distribution ==
Plectocarpon galapagoense is endemic to the Galapagos Islands. It grows on Sarcographa tricosa sensu lato, which is found on twigs and branches of Chiococca alba trees in the forest understory of Zanthoxylum fagara on Pinta Island.
