= Squamulea galactophylla =

- White thallus with orange-topped apothecia

Scientific classification
- Kingdom: Fungi
- Division: Ascomycota
- Class: Lecanoromycetes
- Order: Teloschistales
- Family: Teloschistaceae
- Genus: Squamulea
- Species: S. galactophylla

Binomial name
- Squamulea galactophylla (Tuck.) Arup, Søchting & Frödén

Synonyms
- Caloplaca galactophylla (Tuck.) Riddle; Placodium galactophyllum Tuck.

Species of lichen

Orange-topped apothecia with thallus consisting of separate squamules

At right-center of limestone boulder

Squamulea galactophylla, sometimes called firedot lichen, orange lichen and similar names, is a species of squamulose lichen. Occurring in the United States and Mexico, it belongs to the family Teloschistaceae.

== Description ==
Squamulea galactophylla, unlike most species of the genus Squamulea, can be distinguished from other species without resorting to molecular phylogenetic analysis. Here are key, relatively easy to see features of the species:

- The rock-inhabiting lichen body, or thallus, is squamulose, and dirty-whitish with a kind of frosty, or pruinose appearance. The thallus's outside margin is only slightly lobed.
- The spore-producing disc, or apothecium, is cinnamon-brown to somewhat golden or red-orange. Its flat surface is up to 1 mm (1/32 in) in diameter. Around the apothecium top's edge there is tiny collar-like rim, the "thalline margin."
- There are no soredia, but pycnidia are present, usually immersed in tissue.
- A chemical spot test when adding potassium hydroxide causes a color change (K+) to red.

== Distribution ==
In the US, Squamulea galactophylla occurs from Minnesota and Wisconsin in the north, south to Texas and then west through Arizona to southern California. In Mexico it is found in the north, including Baja California, and southward through the eastern states, into the southernmost state of Chiapas.

== Habitat ==
Squamulea galactophylla occurs on both calcareous and noncalcareous rocks.

== Taxonomy ==
In 1877, when Edward Tuckerman formally described and named Squamulea galactophylla under the basionym of Placodium galactophyllum, he noted that his type specimen was collected "On lime rocks, Chase Co., Kansas, E. Hall, 1871." Surely "E. Hall" was the American surveyor, farmer and botanist Elihu Hall (1822–1882), who collected specimens in Kansas.

== The photobiont ==
The photobiont for Squamulea galactophylla appears not to be determined. However, the photobiont for the closely related Squamulea subsoluta has been found to be a single-celled, spherical, non-swimming green alga other than of the genus Trentepohlia, and often photobionts of a species are inherited from a common ancestor.

=== Phylogeny ===
A study using an integrated approach combining morphological, anatomical, chemical and molecular analyses found Squamulea galactophylla to form a clade with Squamulea subsoluta and Squamulea squamosa. With 92% support, Squamulea galactophylla was sister to the other two species.

=== Etymology ===
The genus name Squamulea refers to the squamulose thallus observed in most species of the genus.

The choice of the species name was not explained by Edward Tuckerman when he chose the basionym Placodium galactophyllum in 1877. However, a good guess is that galactophylla is constructed from the Greek galakto, meaning "milk," and the Greek phyllon, meaning "leaf." Thus "milk-leaf," a fair description of the thallus's whitish body.
