= Amundsenia austrocontinentalis =

Scientific classification
- Domain: Eukaryota
- Kingdom: Fungi
- Division: Ascomycota
- Class: Lecanoromycetes
- Order: Teloschistales
- Family: Teloschistaceae
- Genus: Amundsenia
- Species: A. austrocontinentalis

Binomial name
- Amundsenia austrocontinentalis Garrido-Ben., Søchting, Pérez-Ort. & Seppelt (2014)

Species of lichen

Amundsenia austrocontinentalis is a species of saxicolous (rock-dwelling), crustose lichen in the family Teloschistaceae, and the type species of genus Amundsenia. Found in Antarctica, it was formally described as a new species in 2014 by Isaac Garrido-Benavent, Ulrik Søchting, Sergio Pérez-Ortega, and Rod Seppelt. The type specimen was collected by the last author from Mule Peninsula (Vestfold Hills, Ingrid Christensen Coast), where it was found growing on small stones in glacial till. The species epithet austrocontinentalis refers to its distribution in continental Antarctica.

== Taxonomy ==
Amundsenia austrocontinentalis was formally described in 2014, when Isaac Garrido-Benavent, Ulrik Søchting, Sergio Pérez-Ortega, and Rod Seppelt erected both the genus Amundsenia and its Antarctic type species on the basis of a three-gene phylogeny of Teloschistaceae. The analysis placed the genus in subfamily Xanthorioideae as a well-supported sister lineage to Squamulea. The holotype was collected at 8 m elevation on Mule Peninsula in the Vestfold Hills, Ingrid Christensen Coast, from glacial till pebbles.

Although morphologically rather austere, the species is separable from others in its genus and from the superficially similar Charcotiana antarctica. It has flat, pale yellow-orange areoles, thicker apothecial margins and markedly smaller, thin-septate polardiblastic spores (8–13 μm long with a 2–3 μm septum). In contrast, C. antarctica develops coralloid protrusions, deeper orange colours and longer spores with stouter septa. The combination of minute crustose thallus, prosoplectenchymatous proper exciple and chemosyndrome A (parietin-dominated) underpins the generic placement.

== Description ==
The lichen has an areolate growth form, reaching a diameter of up to 3 cm (1.2 in) in diameter; the individual areoles comprising the thallus are 0.2–0.8 mm wide and 0.1–0.3 mm high. The colour of the thallus is deep yellow to pale orange, although abraded or dead specimens can become whitish. The apothecia are either lecanorine to zeorine in form, measuring 0.2–1.5 mm wide, with a flat to slightly concave pale orange disc that often has orange pruina. Ascospores number eight per ascus, and are ellipsoid and polaridiblastic (pierced by a narrow channel) with dimensions of 8–13.5 by 4.0-6.5 μm.

== Habitat and distribution ==
The species is restricted to continental Antarctica, with confirmed records from the Vestfold Hills, the Windmill Islands and multiple localities in southern Victoria Land, including Ross Island and the McMurdo Dry Valleys. It occurs from the supralittoral zone at 8 m elevation up to roughly 750 m on inland nunataks and valley walls, and can be locally abundant.

Amundsenia austrocontinentalis is strictly saxicolous, favouring hard siliceous substrates such as granite, dolerite felsenmeer, moraine pebbles or scoria rubble. Thalli are often tucked into narrow fissures or beneath exfoliating flakes where transient melt-water, shelter from katabatic winds and strong insolation create slightly milder microhabitats. It frequently grows alongside other cold desert lichens, for example Austroplaca darbishirei, Lecidea cancriformis and Rhizoplaca melanophthalma. Both the areoles and the apothecia may develop micro-stipes, a trait interpreted as reducing contact with the intensely frozen rock surface in this extreme environment.
