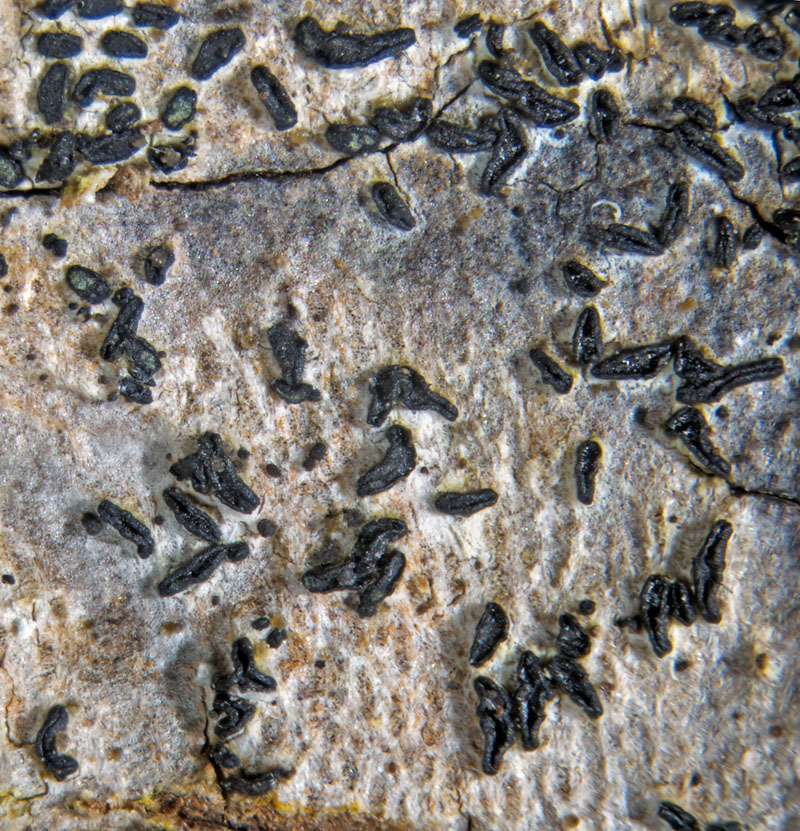

Scientific classification
- Domain: Eukaryota
- Kingdom: Fungi
- Division: Ascomycota
- Class: Arthoniomycetes
- Order: Arthoniales
- Family: Lecanographaceae
- Genus: Alyxoria
- Species: A. varia

Binomial name
- Alyxoria varia (Pers.) Ertz & Tehler (2011)

Synonyms
- List: Opegrapha varia Pers. (1794); Lichen diaphorus Ach. (1799); Graphis varia (Pers.) Branth & Rostr. (1869); Opegrapha notha var. diaphora (Ach.) Ach. (1814); Opegrapha hysterimorpha var. diaphora (Ach.) L.Marchand (1829); Opegrapha varia f. diaphora (Ach.) Fr. (1831); Opegrapha varia var. diaphora (Ach.) Fr. (1831); Opegrapha varia subsp. diaphora (Ach.) Harm. (1900); Lichen signatus Ach. (1799); Opegrapha diaphora var. signata (Ach.) Ach. (1803); Opegrapha notha var. signata (Ach.) Ach. (1803); Opegrapha signata (Ach.) Ach. (1809); Opegrapha hebraica var. signata (Ach.) L.Marchand (1829); Graphis signata (Ach.) Wallr. (1831); Opegrapha varia var. signata (Ach.) Fr. (1831); Opegrapha varia f. signata (Ach.) Schaer. (1850); Graphis varia f. signata (Ach.) Branth & Rostrup (1869); Opegrapha pulicaris f. signata (Ach.) Nyl. (1876); Opegrapha diaphora f. signata (Ach.) J.Nowak (1983); Opegrapha diaphora Ach. (1803); Opegrapha rimalis Ach. (1809); Opegrapha hebraica var. rimalis (Ach.) L.Marchand (1829); Opegrapha varia var. rimalis (Ach.) Fr. (1831); Opegrapha cymbiformis var. rimalis (Ach.) Schaer. (1836); Opegrapha atra var. rimalis (Ach.) A.Massal. (1853); Opegrapha varia f. rimalis (Ach.) Leight. (1871); Opegrapha diaphora var. rimalis (Ach.) H.Olivier (1901); Opegrapha chlorina Pers. (1810); Opegrapha cymbiformis [unranked] chlorina (Pers.) D.Dietr. (1846); Opegrapha varia f. chlorina (Pers.) Schaer. (1850); Opegrapha varia var. chlorina (Pers.) A.Massal. (1853); Opegrapha notha var. chlorina (Pers.) Mong. (1900); Opegrapha diaphora f. chlorina (Pers.) H.Olivier (1902); Opegrapha diaphora var. chlorina (Pers.) H.Olivier (1914); Opegrapha lichenoides var. chlorina (Pers.) Redinger (1938); Opegrapha lichenoides f. chlorina (Pers.) Erichsen (1957); Opegrapha tridens Ach. (1810); Opegrapha varia var. tridens (Ach.) Schaer. (1850); Opegrapha varia f. tridens (Ach.) Mudd (1861); Opegrapha diaphora var. tridens (Ach.) H.Olivier (1902); Opegrapha signata var. tigrina Ach. (1810); Opegrapha notha var. tigrina (Ach.) Ach. (1814); Opegrapha varia var. tigrina (Ach.) Schaer. (1850); Opegrapha varia f. tigrina (Ach.) Mudd (1861); Opegrapha diaphora var. tigrina (Ach.) H.Olivier (1902); Opegrapha diaphora f. tigrina (Ach.) J.Nowak (1983); Alyxoria diaphora Gray (1821); Graphis varia f. diaphora Branth & Rostrup (1869); Opegrapha pulicaris f. diaphora Nyl. (1876); Opegrapha diaphora f. herbicola Nyl. (1877)

= Alyxoria varia =

Species of lichen

Alyxoria varia is a widely distributed species of corticolous (bark-dwelling), crustose lichen in the family Lecanographaceae. Its common name, scribble lichen, refers to the form of its ascomata (fruiting bodies), which are long or short, sometimes branched, and with blackened walls and bases. The thallus of the lichen is hidden mostly within the bark itself and barely visible.

== Taxonomy ==
Alyxoria varia was described as a new species in 1794 by Christiaan Hendrik Persoon, who originally classified it in the genus Opegrapha. It has had a long and complicated taxonomic history, having been redescribed under different names several times. It got its current binomial name when it was reclassified in the genus Alyxoria by Damien Ertz and Anders Tehler in 2011. Alyxoria varia is thought to represent a complex of species with uncertain phylogenetic placement.

== Growth and development ==
Research on the growth and development of Alyxoria varia ascomata has provided insights into their longevity and reproductive strategies. A long-term study using sequential photography over several years revealed that ascomata can continue to grow for a decade or more, elongating from both ends. The growth rate of ascomata declines with age, with the most rapid growth occurring at initiation. Ascomata reach maturity (>1 mm long) in about 5 years, but can continue growing to reach lengths of approximately 3 mm after 10 years or more. Ascus development begins early, with even the smallest observed ascomata (0.19 mm long and estimated to be 10 months old) containing a high density of asci.

The density of asci in the pseudohymenium is highest in younger, smaller ascomata and declines with age. Mature ascospores appear about 10 months after ascoma initiation. After reaching maturity at around 5 years, the ascus density within the pseudohymenium declines, although individual ascomata may persist for a decade or more.

This growth pattern suggests that A. varia invests significantly in sexual reproduction from an early stage and continues this investment over an extended period, potentially enhancing its reproductive success and dispersal capabilities.
