= Huriella =

Scientific classification
- Kingdom: Fungi
- Division: Ascomycota
- Class: Lecanoromycetes
- Order: Teloschistales
- Family: Teloschistaceae
- Genus: Huriella; S.Y.Kondr. (2017)

Type species
- Huriella loekoesiana S.Y.Kondr. & Upreti (2017)

Genus of lichens

Huriella is a genus of lichen-forming fungi in the family Teloschistaceae. It comprises five species of crustose lichens.

== Taxonomy ==
The genus was circumscribed in 2017 by the Ukrainian lichen Sergey Kondratyuk to accommodate Squamulea-type lichens with an areolate, rather than squamulose, thallus. The genus name honours the Korean lichenologist Jae-Seoun Hur. He assigned Huriella loekoesiana as the type (and initially only) species, but this species has since been reclassified to Squamulea, which some consider to be synonymous with Huriella.

== Species ==
- Huriella aeruginosa B.G.Lee & Hur (2021)
- Huriella flakusii Wilk (2020)
- Huriella pohangensis S.Y.Kondr., Lőkös & Hur (2018)
- Huriella salyangiana S.Y.Kondr. & Hur (2018)
- Huriella upretiana S.Y.Kondr., G.K.Mishra, Nayaka & A.Thell (2020)
