= Alyxoria cyanea =

Scientific classification
- Kingdom: Fungi
- Division: Ascomycota
- Class: Arthoniomycetes
- Order: Arthoniales
- Family: Lecanographaceae
- Genus: Alyxoria
- Species: A. cyanea

Binomial name
- Alyxoria cyanea Aptroot (2020)

Species of lichen-forming fungus

Alyxoria cyanea is a species of saxicolous (rock-dwelling), crustose lichen in the family Lecanographaceae. Found in Brazil, it was described as a new species by Dutch lichenologist André Aptroot. This lichen is characterized by its vivid blue-green epihymenium and 5-7 septate ascospores, which measure 23–27 by 5–6 μm and are surrounded by a 1.5 μm wide gelatinous sheath. The species was named after the blue pigment found in its epihymenium.

Alyxoria cyanea is crustose with a continuous, non-corticate, dull, pale greenish-brown thallus. The ascomata, or fruiting bodies, are sessile and solitary, with a purplish-brown to black disc and a raised margin. Vivid blue-green colours are rare among lichenized ascomycetes, and this feature makes Alyxoria cyanea unique among Arthoniales lichens. The chemistry of Alyxoria cyanea reveals no reactions to UV, C, P, or K spot tests, and its thin-layer chromatography analysis does not detect the presence of any substances.

Alyxoria cyanea is found on sheltered limestone in the Atlantic rainforest of Brazil. It shares its habitat with Opegrapha corumbensis, another lichen species that Aptroot suggests is likely to be classified under the Alyxoria genus in the future. The type specimen of A. cyanea as collected from the Serra da Bodoquena in Mato Grosso do Sul. The lichen has also been recorded in São Francisco do Sul (Santa Catarina).

== See also ==
- List of lichens of Brazil
