= Alyxoria wainioi =

Scientific classification
- Kingdom: Fungi
- Division: Ascomycota
- Class: Arthoniomycetes
- Order: Arthoniales
- Family: Lecanographaceae
- Genus: Alyxoria
- Species: A. wainioi

Binomial name
- Alyxoria wainioi (Zahlbr.) S.Joseph, G.P.Sinha & Ramach. (2018)

Synonyms
- Opegrapha wainioi Zahlbr. (1923)

Species of lichen-forming fungus

Alyxoria wainioi is a species of lichen in the family Lecanographaceae. It was originally formally described by Finnish lichenologist Edvard August Vainio in 1901, as Opegrapha ochracea. Vainio identified it as a new species from samples collected in Africa by the Austrian botanist Friedrich Martin Josef Welwitsch. However, this name was not validly published as it was an illegitimate homonym; in 1824 Johann Adam Philipp Hepp had transferred Arthonia ochracea, a lichen originally named by Léon Marie Dufour in 1818, into genus Opegrapha, and thus the name Opegrapha ochracea was already occupied by this taxon. So in 1923, Alexander Zahlbruckner renamed Vainio's taxon as Opegrapha wainioi. Nearly a century later, it was transferred to genus Alyxoria in 2018 by Indian lichenologists following a revision of the genus Opegrapha.
