= Alyxoria viridipruinosa =

Scientific classification
- Kingdom: Fungi
- Division: Ascomycota
- Class: Arthoniomycetes
- Order: Arthoniales
- Family: Lecanographaceae
- Genus: Alyxoria
- Species: A. viridipruinosa

Binomial name
- Alyxoria viridipruinosa (Coppins & Yahr) Ertz (2012)

Synonyms
- Opegrapha viridipruinosa Coppins & Yahr (2011)

Species of lichen-forming fungus

Alyxoria viridipruinosa is a species of corticolous (bark-dwelling) and lignicolous (wood-dwelling) lichen in the family Lecanographaceae. It is found in Europe, where it grows on hardwood trees.

== Taxonomy ==
The lichen was first formally described as a new species in 2011 by lichenologists Brian Coppins and Rebecca Yahr. The type specimen was collected from Needham Market (Mid Suffolk, England), where it was found growing on the bark of Sambucus in a little-used, sheltered, chalk pit. The species epithet refers to the yellowish-green colour of the pruina visible on the discs and pycnidia. Damien Ertz transferred the taxon to the genus Alyxoria in 2012.

== Description ==
The lichen has a thin, grey-green, powdery thallus. Its ascomata are in the form of lirellae that are evenly distributed throughout the thallus, and typically measure 0.3–0.6 mm long and 0.1–0.3 mm wide. The mostly-exposed disc is dark brown and covered with a green pruina that turns yellow after being dried. The ascospores, which measure eight per ascus, are hyaline, usually have 4 or 5 septa, and typically measure 15–19 by 4–5 μm.

== Habitat and distribution ==
In addition to England, Alyxoria viridipruinosa has also been recorded in Northern Ireland, Scotland, Germany, and the Netherlands. It grows on a variety of hardwood trees, usually in secondary woodland, and often at forest edges.
