= Plectocarpon serusiauxii =

Scientific classification
- Kingdom: Fungi
- Division: Ascomycota
- Class: Arthoniomycetes
- Order: Arthoniales
- Family: Lecanographaceae
- Genus: Plectocarpon
- Species: P. serusiauxii

Binomial name
- Plectocarpon serusiauxii Ertz & Diederich (2005)

Species of lichen

Plectocarpon serusiauxii is a species of lichenicolous lichen in the family Lecanographaceae. It was described as a new species in 2005 by Damien Ertz and Paul Diederich. The type specimen was collected on Réunion, where it was found growing on Sticta. The specific epithet serusiauxii honours Belgian lichenologist Emmanuël Sérusiaux.
