= Lecanographa imitans =

Scientific classification
- Domain: Eukaryota
- Kingdom: Fungi
- Division: Ascomycota
- Class: Arthoniomycetes
- Order: Arthoniales
- Family: Lecanographaceae
- Genus: Lecanographa
- Species: L. imitans

Binomial name
- Lecanographa imitans B.Werner & Follmann (2003)

Species of lichen

Lecanographa imitans is a rare species of lichenicolous (lichen-dwelling) fungus in the family Lecanographaceae. Found on the Galápagos Islands, it was described as new to science in 2003 by Birgit Werner and Gerhard Follman. The holotype specimen was collected on Baltra Island, north of Santa Cruz Island, in January 1929. The fungus grows specifically on the thallus of Roccella gracilis, a fruticose lichen. The species epithet imitans (Latin for "imitating" or "mimicking") refers to the potential confusion of its ascomata (fruiting bodies) with the true fructifications of its host lichen.

Lecanographa imitans is characterised by its parasitic nature, causing discoloured widenings and swellings on the branches of R. humboldtiana. It produces scattered to aggregate ascomata, initially immersed and later erumpent, measuring 0.2–0.5 mm in diameter. The fungus causes significant alterations to its host's structure, including changes in the cortical hyphae arrangement and algal layer. L. imitans belongs to the L. grumulosa group but shows unique features, including persistent false thalline margins around its ascomata and larger, mostly six-celled ascospores. The species is known only from Baltra and Pinzón islands in the Galápagos Archipelago, where it inhabits the humid coastal areas, primarily on mangroves and sclerophyllous shrubs.
