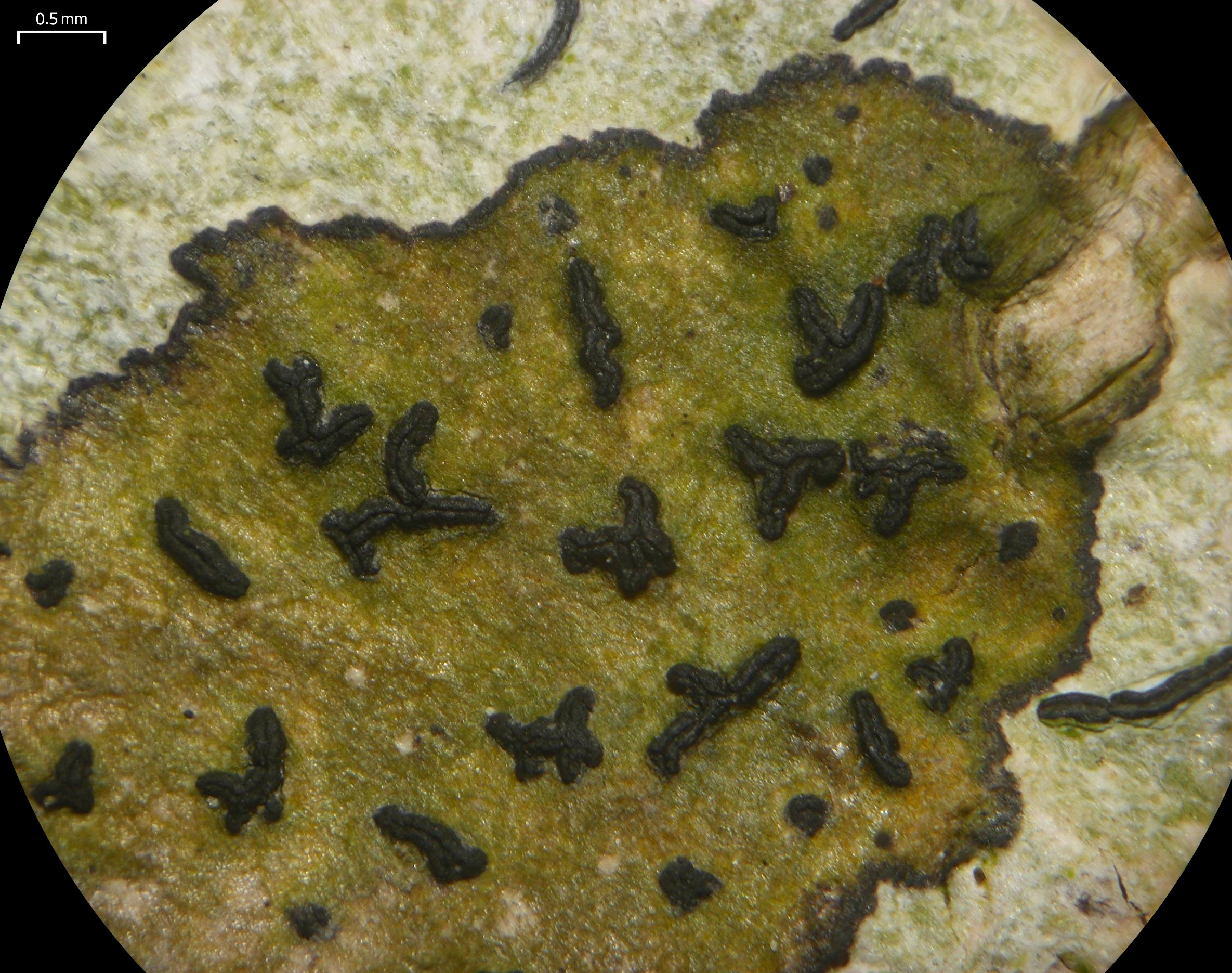

Scientific classification
- Kingdom: Fungi
- Division: Ascomycota
- Class: Arthoniomycetes
- Order: Arthoniales
- Family: Lecanographaceae
- Genus: Zwackhia
- Species: Z. viridis

Binomial name
- Zwackhia viridis (Ach.) Poetsch & Schied. (1872)

Synonyms
- List: Opegrapha rubella var. viridis Ach. (1803); Opegrapha viridis Pers. ex Ach. (1803); Opegrapha viridis (Ach.) Ach. (1814); Graphis viridis (Ach.) Branth & Rostr. (1869); Opegrapha herpetica var. viridis (Ach.) Boistel (1903); Sclerographa viridis (Ach.) Erichsen (1939); Graphis involuta Wallr. (1831); Lecanactis involuta (Wallr.) A.Massal. (1860); Opegrapha involuta (Wallr.) Jatta (1900); Zwackhia involuta (Wallr.) Körb. (1855)

= Zwackhia viridis =

Species of lichen

Zwackhia viridis is a species of corticolous (bark-dwelling), script lichen in the family Lecanographaceae. It has a cosmopolitan distribution, and has been documented in Africa, Asia, the Americas, Europe, and Oceania.

== Taxonomy ==
The lichen was first formally described by the Swedish lichenologist Erik Acharius, as Opegrapha rubella var. viridis. Ignaz Poetsch and Karl Schiedermayr transferred it to the genus Zwackhia in 1872.

== Description ==
Zwackhia viridis is characterised by a subtle and svelte thallus that can range from being barely noticeable to a fine texture. Its colour spectrum includes shades of pale brown, grey, greenish-grey, brownish-grey, and green, all in a matte finish. On occasion, a prothallus can be observed, distinguishable by its dark brown hue and a width spanning 0.1–0.2 mm.

The ascomata (spore-producing structures) are dispersed relatively evenly across the thallus, though sometimes they appear in clusters of two to four. These structures are lirelliform (slit-like) in shape, generally straight, but can also have curved or slightly flexuous patterns. They are black and measure between 0.2 and 1.2 mm in length and 0.15–0.3 mm in width. Their hymenial disc is not pruinose and looks like a distinct slit.

Underneath the hymenium, the excipulum is of a dark brown shade which turns an olivaceous colour upon a potassium hydroxide (K) chemical spot test. This structure's width varies from 25 to 50 μm on the sides to 15–80 μm at the base. The hypothecium beneath is pale brown, stands 5–20 μm tall, and reacts to tests with an olivaceous hue on K and a red hue on iodine. The hymenium itself is clear and devoid of oil droplets, standing at a height between 75 and 120 μm. When exposed to potassium hydroxide and iodine (K/I), it turns blue. The branched paraphysoids intertwine and measure between 1.0 and 1.5 μm in width without a distinct enlarged tip. The epihymenium on top is a pale brown shade, which turns red when exposed to iodine.

Asci, the sac-like structures that produce spores, have a clavate to ellipsoid shape. They hold eight spores and range in size from 55 to 70 by 16–22 μm, with a pronounced apical blue ring upon K/I exposure. The ascospores are fusiform, clear, predominantly straight but occasionally exhibit a slight curve. They have 10–15 (up to 17) septa without constriction at these divisions. These spores, in their mature state, have median cells roughly equal in length and breadth, with the end locules being more stretched. They measure between 30.0 and 42.5 by 4.5–7.5 μm. The perispore around the spores is 1.5–2.5 μm wide and clear, but it transitions to an even brown hue when it matures beyond its prime.

== Habitat and distribution ==
Zwackhia viridis has a cosmopolitan distribution, having been documented in Africa, Asia, the Americas, Europe, and Oceania. It was first reported from the Chatham Islands in 2020. It was rediscovered in Lower Saxony (Germany) after exactly 150 years; according to the Red List of Lower Saxony (under Opegrapha viridis), the species has been considered extinct in the hill and mountain regions since 1885.
