= Sigridea labyrinthica =

Scientific classification
- Domain: Eukaryota
- Kingdom: Fungi
- Division: Ascomycota
- Class: Arthoniomycetes
- Order: Arthoniales
- Family: Roccellaceae
- Genus: Sigridea
- Species: S. labyrinthica

Binomial name
- Sigridea labyrinthica (Follmann) Ertz & Diederich (2005)

Synonyms
- Plectocarpon labyrinthicum Follmann (2003)

Species of lichen

Sigridea labyrinthica is a species of lichenicolous (lichen-dwelling) fungus in the family Arthoniaceae. Discovered on the Pacific coast of Chile, it was formally described as a new species in 2003 by Gerhard Follman, who first classified it in the genus Plectocarpon. Damien Ertz and Paul Diederich transferred it to the genus Sigridea in 2005. The holotype was collected at Punta Caraumilla, Bahia Laguna Verde, southwest of Valparaíso, on September 15, 1968, by Otto Zöllner Schorr. The fungus grows specifically on the thallus of Roccella portentosa, a fruticose lichen commonly found along the rocky Pacific coast. The species epithet labyrinthicum (Latin for "labyrinthine" or "intricate") refers to the maze-like appearance of its gall-forming ascomata (fruiting bodies).

Sigridea labyrinthica is characterised by its distinctive fructifications, forming flattened galls measuring 0.9–3.8 mm in horizontal diameter and 0.4–1.2 mm in vertical diameter on its host. These galls have a labyrinthine surface reminiscent of Chiodecton dilatatum, subdivided into multiform lirellate loculi by whitish, erumpent striae of stromatic plectenchyma. The fungus produces opegraphoid but caudate asci containing eight hyaline, almost clavate, four-celled ascospores. Sigridea labyrinthica is endemic to the temperate to Mediterranean coastland of the Pacific-Andean province of South America, ranging from approximately 30° to 34° south latitude. This species is of particular interest to lichenologists due to its unique gall-forming nature and its specific association with R. portentosa, a lichen historically used for textile dye production.
