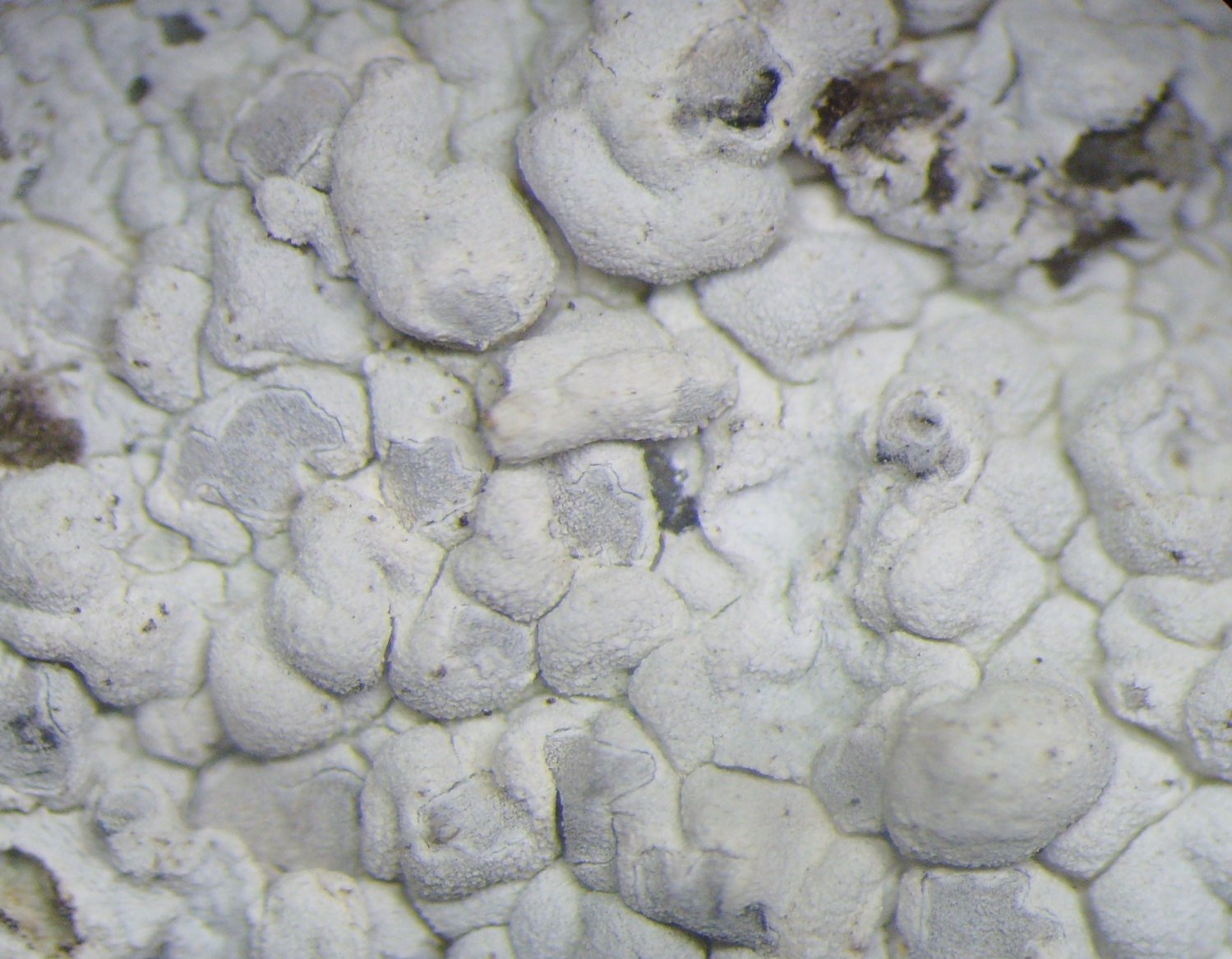
- Lecanographa dialeuca

Scientific classification
- Domain: Eukaryota
- Kingdom: Fungi
- Division: Ascomycota
- Class: Arthoniomycetes
- Order: Arthoniales
- Family: Lecanographaceae
- Genus: Lecanographa; Egea & Torrente (1994)

Type species
- Lecanographa lyncea (Sm.) Egea & Torrente (1994)

= Lecanographa =

Genus of lichens

Lecanographa is a genus of about 20 species of lichens in the family Lecanographaceae. These lichens typically form thin, extensive crusts that can be chalk-white, grey, or pale green, with dark brown to black reproductive structures that are often covered in a dense frosting (pruina) of white, bluish, or greyish crystals. Established as a genus in 1994 by José M. Egea and Pilar Torrente, the lichens are characterized by their partnership with orange-tinged filamentous algae and their production of slender, spindle-shaped spores with multiple cross-walls that are wrapped in a gelatinous outer layer.

== Taxonomy ==
The genus was circumscribed in 1994 by José M. Egea and Pilar Torrente, with Lecanographa lyncea as the type species.

== Description ==
Lecanographa species spread as a thin, often extensive crust that can be chalk-white, grey or pale green. The crust's surface is usually smooth or cracked into an irregular mosaic; on rare occasions it takes on a powdery (leprose) appearance. Because the thallus lacks a true cortex—a distinct protective skin—the fungal layer merges directly with the algal partner, and its edge may be outlined by a darker hypothallus. Isidia (tiny finger-like propagules) are never formed, but some species develop granular soralia: these are mealy patches packed with fungal and algal cells that function as ready-made fragments for dispersal. The photosynthetic partner is almost always the orange-tinged filamentous alga Trentepohlia, although an uncommon growth form contains the green algal genus Trebouxia instead.

The sexual fruit bodies range from round discs to narrow, crack-like lirellae. They are dark brown to black and typically wear a dense frosting of white, bluish or greyish crystals (pruina) that makes them stand out against the pale thallus. A rim of thallus tissue is missing, so the fruit body's own wall—the true exciple—remains exposed as a raised black border. Internally, the hymenium is colourless but stains reddish or blue with iodine, and it is threaded by unbranched or sparsely branched paraphysoids whose swollen, brown tips form a low cap (epithecium). The asci are long and narrow, releasing eight ascospores each; their apex shows the Grumulosa pattern, where a pale-blue dome surrounds a tiny ocular chamber ringed by a darker iodine-positive zone.

The ascospores themselves are slender, spindle-shaped to needle-like, with three to nineteen cross-walls. Their internal septa thicken conspicuously, and each spore is wrapped in a gelatinous outer layer that swells in potassium hydroxide solution. While young spores are colourless, they may become faintly brown with age. Asexual reproduction takes place in small flask-shaped pycnidia embedded in the crust; these structures exude minute, rod-shaped conidia that allow the fungus to disperse without its algal partner. Chemical analyses show that many species contain no detectable secondary metabolites, although confluentic acid, erythrin or other unidentified compounds have been reported in a few taxa.

== Species ==
As of June 2025, Species Fungorum (in the Catalogue of Life) accept 20 species of Lecanographa.

- Lecanographa abscondita (Th.Fr.) Egea & Torrente (1994)
- Lecanographa amylacea (Ehrh. ex Pers.) Egea & Torrente (1994)
- Lecanographa atropunctata Sparrius, Saipunk. & Wolseley (2006) – Southeast Asia
- Lecanographa azurea Follmann (2008) – Chile
- Lecanographa brattiae (Egea & Ertz) Ertz & Tehler (2011)
- Lecanographa dialeuca (Cromb.) Egea & Torrente (1994)
- Lecanographa elegans (Stizenb.) Mies & M.Schultz (2004)
- Lecanographa imitans B.Werner & Follmann (2003) – South America
- Lecanographa insolita Lendemer & K.Knudsen (2010) – North America
- Lecanographa lyncea (Sm.) Egea & Torrente (1994)
- Lecanographa martii (Nyl.) Ertz (2009)
- Lecanographa microcarpella (Müll.Arg.) Egea & Torrente (1994)
- Lecanographa nothofagi Kantvilas (2004)
- Lecanographa rinodinae (Vězda) R.Sant. (2004)
- Lecanographa rosea Etayo & Paz-Berm. (2018) – Angola
- Lecanographa rufa (Müll.Arg.) Ertz (2009)
- Lecanographa solicola P.M.McCarthy & J.A.Elix (2018)
- Lecanographa subnothella (Nyl.) Ertz (2009)
- Lecanographa uniseptata Ertz, van den Boom, Tehler & Degreef (2010) – Gabon; Guatelama
