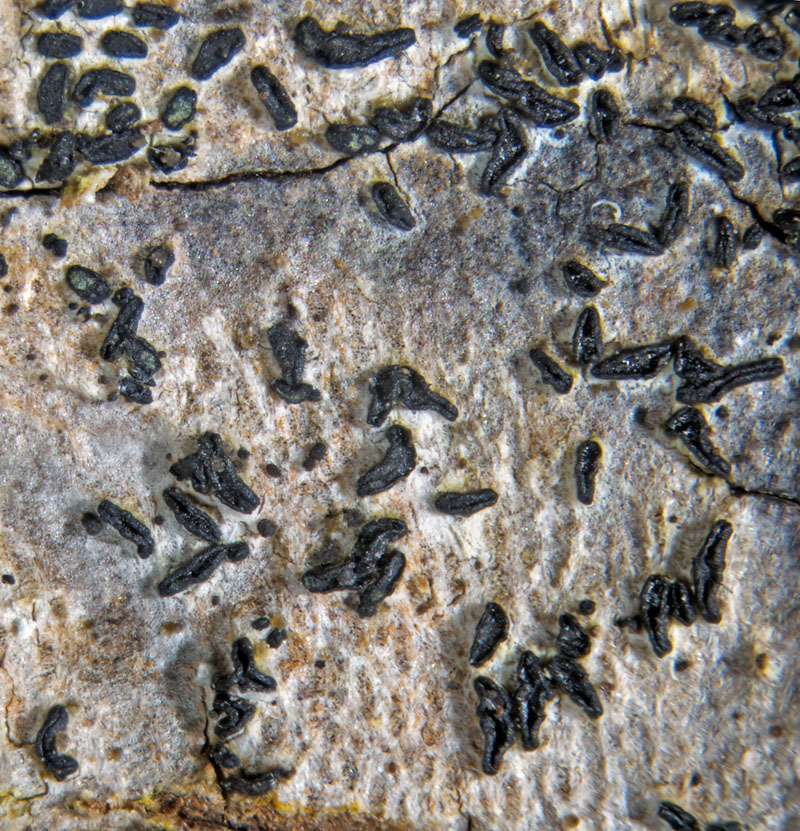
- Alyxoria varia

Scientific classification
- Kingdom: Fungi
- Division: Ascomycota
- Class: Arthoniomycetes
- Order: Arthoniales
- Family: Lecanographaceae
- Genus: Alyxoria; Ach. ex Gray (1821)

Type species
- Alyxoria diaphora Ach. ex Gray (1821)

Species
- See text

= Alyxoria =

Genus of lichens

Alyxoria is a genus of lichen-forming fungi in the family Lecanographaceae. The genus has a cosmopolitan distribution. These lichens are often so inconspicuous that they appear as little more than faint cracks or weathered patches on tree bark and rock surfaces, making them easily overlooked in the field. The genus includes about 20 species that reproduce through distinctive elongated slits containing spores, and can also spread asexually through tiny flask-shaped structures that release microscopic propagules.

== Description ==
Alyxoria typically forms a very thin, often barely visible crust that infiltrates the surface of the bark or rock rather than sitting on top of it. In some species the thallus is so reduced that it soon weathers away, leaving only scattered patches or a faint network of cracks (rimose texture) against the substrate. Where the crust is intact it appears smooth, and a hand lens may reveal the orange tinge that betrays the presence of the microscopic filamentous alga Trentepohlia, which supplies the lichen's photosynthetic partner.

The sexual fruit bodies are elongated slits called lirellae. These may be straight, gently curved, or occasionally branch to form a star-like outline, and the tips usually taper to fine points. They lack a surrounding rim of thallus tissue (thalline margin); instead the true exciple—their own wall—is thin and chestnut-brown, often glazed with a frost of minute crystals (pruinose). As the lirellae mature the disc surface becomes exposed and can gape slightly. Inside, the hymenium contains many slender filaments (paraphysoids) that fork and re-join repeatedly, creating a loose mesh; unlike some relatives, their tips rarely swell. Each ascus carries eight long, spindle-shaped spores that are divided by several cross-walls. When young the spores are colourless and wrapped in a clear, gelatinous envelope, but with age they can darken and develop minute wart-like bumps before finally disintegrating.

Asexual propagation occurs in tiny flask-shaped structures (pycnidia) embedded in or sitting on the thallus. These release very small, rod-shaped conidia through a pore at the top, enabling the fungus to disperse independently of its algal partner. Chemical spot tests are of limited use in the genus: most species show no significant colour reactions and thin-layer chromatography has revealed few diagnostic lichen products.

== Species ==
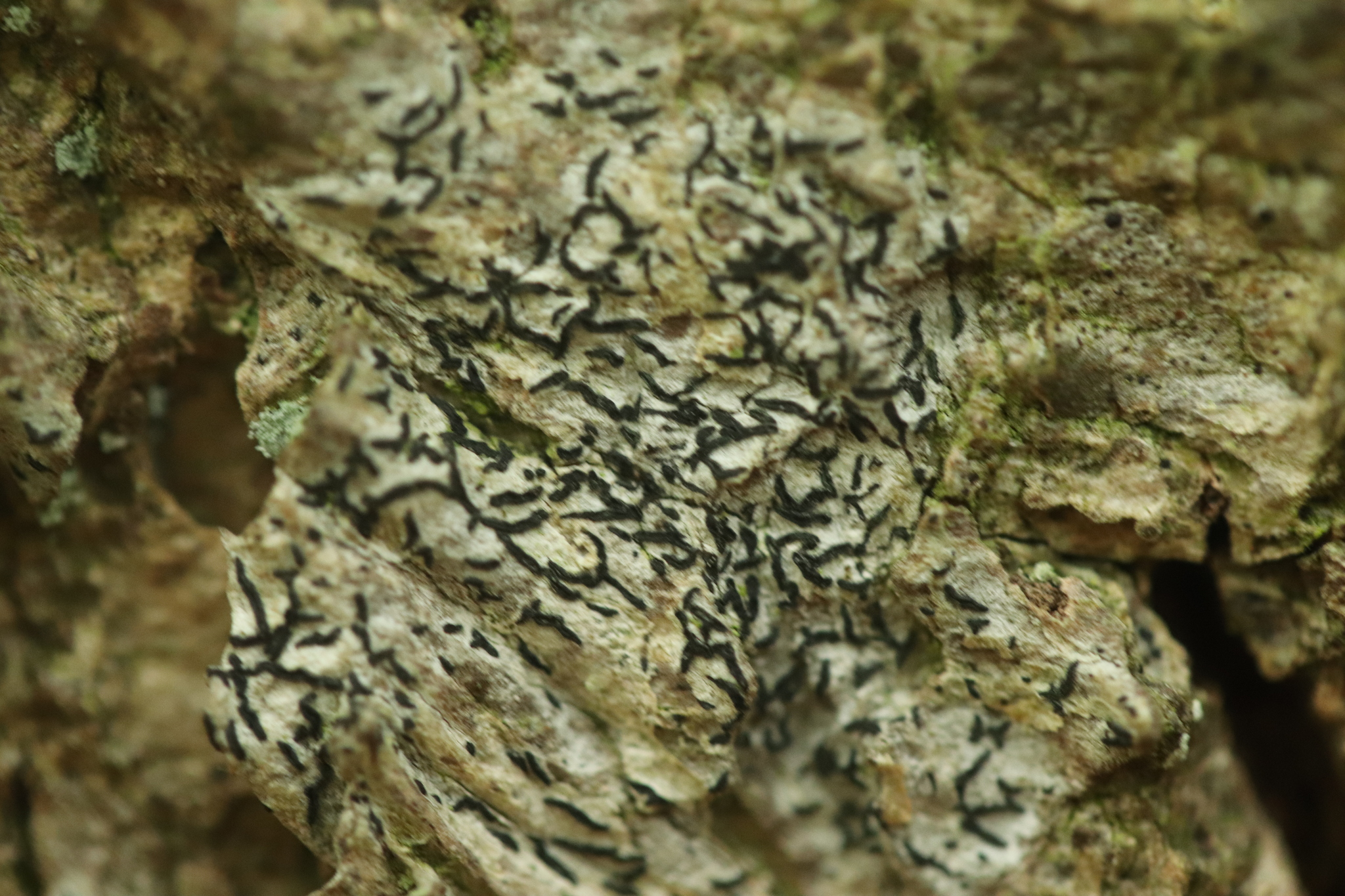
Alyxoria culmigena

- Alyxoria apomelaena (A.Massal.) Ertz (2015)
- Alyxoria bicolor (R.C.Harris & Lendemer) Ertz & Tehler (2011)
- Alyxoria culmigena (Lib.) Ertz (2012)
- Alyxoria cyanea Aptroot (2020) – Brazil
- Alyxoria diaphora Gray (1821)
- Alyxoria fuscospora Ertz, Aptroot & M.Cáceres (2014) – Brazil
- Alyxoria lichenoides (Pers.) Cl.Roux (2017)
- Alyxoria lutulenta (Nyl.) Sipman & Raus (2019)
- Alyxoria mougeotii (A.Massal.) Ertz, Frisch & G.Thor (2014)
- Alyxoria notha (Ach.) Gray (1821)
- Alyxoria ochrocheila (Nyl.) Ertz & Tehler (2011)
- Alyxoria ochrocincta (Werner) Ertz (2012)
- Alyxoria sierramadrensis Ertz, Huereca, Salcedo-Martínez & Tehler (2020) – Mexico
- Alyxoria subelevata (Nyl.) Ertz & Tehler (2011)
- Alyxoria subrimalis (Nyl.) Cl.Roux & Poumarat (2012)
- Alyxoria varia (Pers.) Ertz & Tehler (2011)
- Alyxoria variiformis (Anzi) Ertz (2012)
- Alyxoria viridipruinosa (Coppins & Yahr) Ertz (2012)
- Alyxoria wainioi (Zahlbr.) S.Joseph, G.P.Sinha & Ramach. (2018)
- Alyxoria xerica (Torrente & Egea) Van Haluwyn & Cl.Roux (2020)
