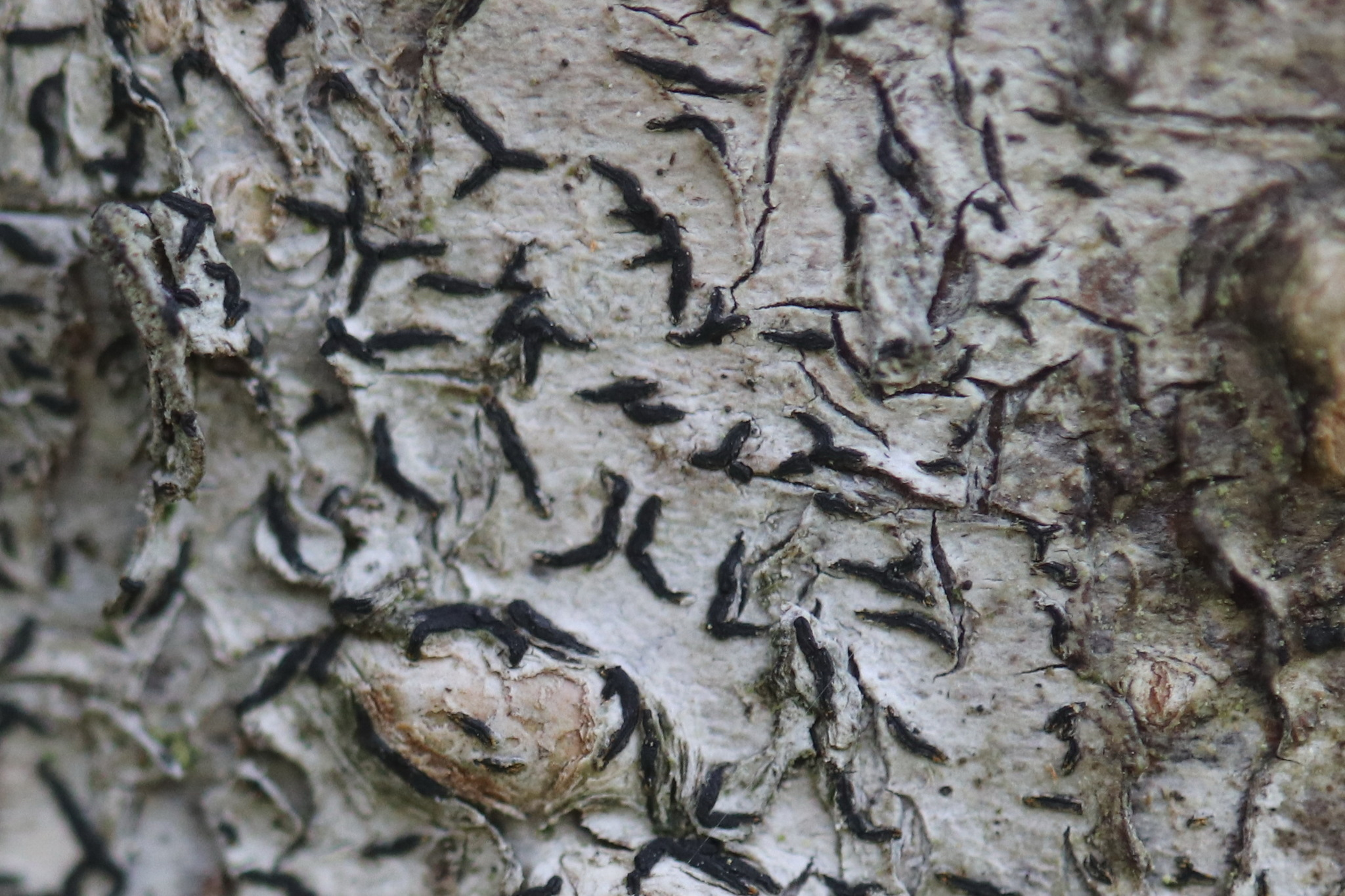

Scientific classification
- Domain: Eukaryota
- Kingdom: Fungi
- Division: Ascomycota
- Class: Arthoniomycetes
- Order: Arthoniales
- Family: Lecanographaceae
- Genus: Alyxoria
- Species: A. ochrocheila

Binomial name
- Alyxoria ochrocheila (Nyl.) Ertz & Tehler

Synonyms
- Synonymy: Opegrapha atra f. ochrocheila (Nyl.) Leight.; Opegrapha atricolor Stirt.; Opegrapha ochrocheila Nyl.; Opegrapha rubescens Sandst.

= Alyxoria ochrocheila =

Species of lichen

Alyxoria ochrocheila is a species of lichen in the family Lecanographaceae. It has a cosmopolitan distribution, and was formally described by William Nylander in 1865.

== Description ==
Alyxoria ochrocheila has an effuse thallus, lacks a prothallus, and is white to white-grey in colour. It is often mistaken for Opegrapha sp., but can be identified due to having distinct orange pruina that turn purple when spot-tested with potassium hydroxide.

== Taxonomy ==
The species was first described by William Nylander in 1865, under the name Opegrapha ochrocheila. It was recombined in 2010 and placed in the genus Alyxoria by Damien Ertz and Anders Tehler, based on phylogenetic analysis.

== Distribution ==
The species is distributed globally, often found in Europe , North America, Africa, Papua New Guinea and the Philippines. It was first identified as occurring in New Zealand in 2016, from a specimen collected from a silver fern trunk in Hillsborough Cemetery in Auckland, New Zealand.
