= Amundsenia =

Scientific classification
- Domain: Eukaryota
- Kingdom: Fungi
- Division: Ascomycota
- Class: Lecanoromycetes
- Order: Teloschistales
- Family: Teloschistaceae
- Genus: Amundsenia; Søchting, Garrido-Ben., Arup & Frödén (2014)

Type species
- Amundsenia austrocontinentalis Garrido-Benavent, Søchting, Pérez-Ortega & Seppelt (2014)

Species
- A. approximata A. austrocontinentalis

Genus of lichens

Amundsenia is a genus of saxicolous (rock-dwelling) crustose lichens in the family Teloschistaceae. It comprises two species. The type species, A. austrocontinentalis, is known found in continental Antarctica, while Amundsenia approximata only occurs in the Arctic. These small orange lichens form thin, crusty growths on rocks in some of Earth's coldest regions, surviving temperatures and conditions that few other organisms can tolerate. The genus was discovered through DNA analysis that revealed these polar lichens from opposite ends of the planet were actually close relatives, despite being separated by the entire globe.

== Taxonomy ==
Amundsenia was circumscribed in 2014 by Isaac Garrido-Benavent, Ulrik Søchting, Sergio Pérez-Ortega, and Rod Seppelt after a three-gene phylogenetic analysis showed that two crustose orange lichens from the high Arctic and from continental Antarctica formed a well-supported, monophyletic branch within the subfamily Xanthorioideae of Teloschistaceae. The clade is sister to Squamulea but differs by its much smaller, thin-septate spores, an entirely crustose (never squamulose) thallus and a prosoplectenchymatous exciple. The type species is Amundsenia austrocontinentalis, with the previously Arctic taxon Caloplaca approximata transferred into the genus at the same time. Only these two species are currently accepted. The generic name honours the Norwegian polar explorer Roald Amundsen (1872–1928) and alludes to the bipolar—north- and south-polar—distribution pattern revealed by the molecular data.

== Description ==
Species of Amundsenia form thin, tightly attached (crustose) thalli that break up into flat, angular areoles 0.2–0.8 mm across. The upper surface is deep yellow to pale orange owing to the anthraquinone compound parietin, the dominant pigment in the thallus and apothecia. Tiny orange apothecial discs (0.2–1.5 mm diameter) are usually scattered rather than clustered; they begin with a thick lecanorine margin but this is soon reduced so that the disc appears flush with, or slightly sunken into, the surrounding thallus. The exciple is built of elongate, radiating cells (prosoplectenchyma), and the hymenium is colourless apart from a dusting of orange epipsamma.

Ascospores are polardiblastic—each spore is divided by a single transverse septum into two equal halves—and are comparatively small (8–13 μm long) with a narrow septum about 2–3 μm thick. Conidiomata have not been observed in either species. All known material shows the same "chemosyndrome A" of Søchting (parietin ± emodin, teloschistin, fallacinal and parietinic acid). These morphological and chemical characters, together with the molecular evidence, separate the genus from other orange crusts in Teloschistaceae.

== Habitat and distribution ==
Amundsenia approximata is widespread in the high Arctic, occurring on siliceous rock from Alaska and Greenland eastwards through Svalbard, Novaya Zemlya and arctic Scandinavia. It favours exposed, moderately nutrient-poor outcrops and boulders from sea-level fjord systems up to roughly 700 m elevation, often sharing the substrate with other cold-tolerant teloschistaceans such as Calogaya or Xanthomendoza.

The second species, A. austrocontinentalis, is so far known only from coastal and inland sites in continental Antarctica—principally the Vestfold Hills and the McMurdo Dry Valleys—where it grows on granite blocks, dolerite felsenmeer and moraine debris between 8 m and about 750 m elevation. It commonly occupies tiny fissures or the undersides of rock flakes where transient melt-water and shelter from katabatic winds create slightly more favourable microclimates. Local associates include the Antarctic endemics Austroplaca darbishirei and Lecidea cancriformis.

Taken together, the two species give Amundsenia an exceptionally disjunct, "bipolar" range: one representative encircles the Arctic while the other is restricted to the climatically harsh interior of Antarctica. Both inhabit open, sun-lit siliceous rocks where the thin crust and pigmented apothecia are presumed to maximise light capture and ultraviolet protection in extreme cold-desert environments.
