= Heterocyphelium =

Scientific classification
- Domain: Eukaryota
- Kingdom: Fungi
- Division: Ascomycota
- Class: Arthoniomycetes
- Order: Arthoniales
- Family: Lecanographaceae
- Genus: Heterocyphelium; Vain. (1927)

Type species
- Heterocyphelium leucampyx (Tuck.) Vain. (1927)

Species
- H. leucampyx H. triseptatum

Genus of lichens in the family Lecanographaceae

Heterocyphelium is a lichen genus in the family Lecanographaceae. It was circumscribed by Finnish lichenologist Edvard August Vainio in 1927, with H. leucampyx assigned as the type species. The genus remained monotypic until a new species, H. triseptatum, was described in 2017 from collections made in Brazil.
