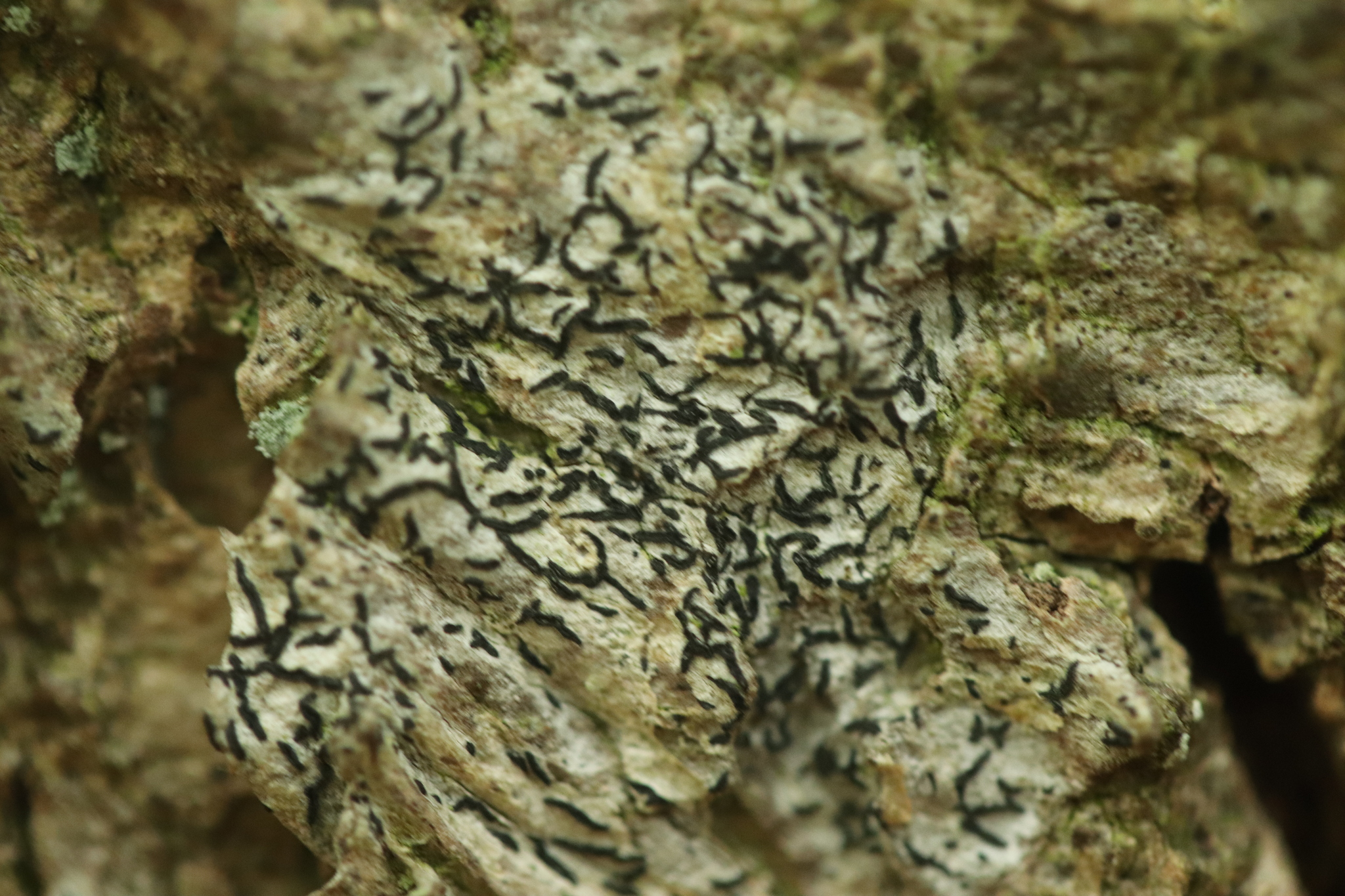

Scientific classification
- Kingdom: Fungi
- Division: Ascomycota
- Class: Arthoniomycetes
- Order: Arthoniales
- Family: Lecanographaceae
- Genus: Alyxoria
- Species: A. culmigena

Binomial name
- Alyxoria culmigena (Lib.) Ertz (2012)

Synonyms
- List: Opegrapha culmigena Lib. (1830); Opegrapha atra var. epilobii A.Massal. (1853); Opegrapha betulina Sm. (1811); Opegrapha herbarum Mont. (1833); Opegrapha betulina var. herbarum (Mont.) Redinger (1938); Opegrapha atra f. herbarum Schaer. (1850); Opegrapha atra var. herbarum (Schaer.) Mont. (1852); Opegrapha vulgata var. herbarum (Schaer.) Grognot (1863); Opegrapha turneri Leight. (1854); Opegrapha prosiliens Stirt. (1874); Opegrapha prosodeoides Vain. (1901); Opegrapha protuberans Zahlbr. (1923)

= Alyxoria culmigena =

Species of lichen-forming fungus

Alyxoria culmigena is a species of script lichen in the family Lecanographaceae. The species forms a very thin, often barely visible greyish or brownish film on bark, with narrow dark fruiting bodies that appear as short script-like lines scattered across the surface. It grows mainly on smooth bark of shrubs and trees in sheltered, humid locations such as coastal hedgerows, and is characteristic of mild lowland climates with warm winters. The lichen is widely distributed in western and southern Europe and has also been recorded from tropical oceanic islands including the Caribbean and the Andaman and Nicobar Islands.

== Taxonomy ==
The lichen was first formally described in 1830 by the Belgian mycologist Marie-Anne Libert, as Opegrapha culmigena. Damien Ertz reclassified it in Alyxoria in 2012.

== Description ==
The thallus of Alyxoria culmigena is very thin and may be barely visible, forming a smooth film that can be ash-grey, brown, or a dull olive-green; in some specimens it is largely immersed in the substrate and only weakly delimited. The fruiting bodies are the narrow, script-like apothecia (lirellae) typical of the genus, appearing as scattered, dark lines about 0.5–1 (occasionally to 1.6) mm long and 0.15–0.3 mm wide, and standing only 0.04–0.10 mm high. They are usually simple but can occasionally fork, and lie directly on the thallus without a stalk. When young, the disc is visible only as a narrow slit, but it soon opens out to expose the interior and may sometimes carry a faint greenish dusting (pruina). In section, the margin (exciple) is red-brown and does not react with potassium hydroxide (K–), while the uppermost layer (epithecium) is brown and turns red-brown or remains brownish in this test; the hymenium beneath is 70–90 μm tall and stains red with iodine (I+).

Ascospores are hyaline and three-septate, measuring (16–)18–24(–26) μm in length and (4–)5–7(–8) μm in width. They are somewhat club-shaped (clavate), with one of the internal cells often slightly swollen, and have rounded ends. Each spore is surrounded by a thin but clearly visible outer layer (perispore) 0.5–1 μm thick, which is colourless when fresh but can become red-brown in over-mature material. Asexual structures are very rarely seen: pycnidia, when present, produce straight, rod-like conidia that are 3–6 × 0.5–1 μm. Standard spot tests on the thallus are all negative (C−, K−, KC−, Pd−, and UV−), and thin-layer chromatography has not revealed any lichen substances, indicating that the species lacks detectable secondary metabolites.

== Habitat and distribution ==
Alyxoria culmigena is a crustose epiphyte that usually grows on smooth, often shaded bark of shrubs and trees, for example in hedgerows and other sheltered stands near the coast. It is most frequently recorded from acidic to basic, smooth bark in shady situations, but also occurs on plant litter, soil, ground-dwelling mosses, plant stems such as brambles, and occasionally on wood or sandstone. Regional lichen floras describe it as a lowland species of mild, humid climates, growing below the montane belt in areas with relatively warm winters, particularly in coastal and sub-Mediterranean districts.

In Europe, the species has been documented from several western and southern countries, including Italy, France, Britain and Ireland. Italian records place it mainly in Tyrrhenian regions with mild winters, below the montane belt, while atlases and online accounts report it on smooth bark in coastal areas of France and on trees in the British Isles and Ireland. Beyond Europe, Alyxoria culmigena has been recorded from oceanic islands in warm climates, including the Andaman and Nicobar Islands of India, where it was described as a new national record, and the Caribbean island of Sint Eustatius and other Dutch Caribbean localities.
