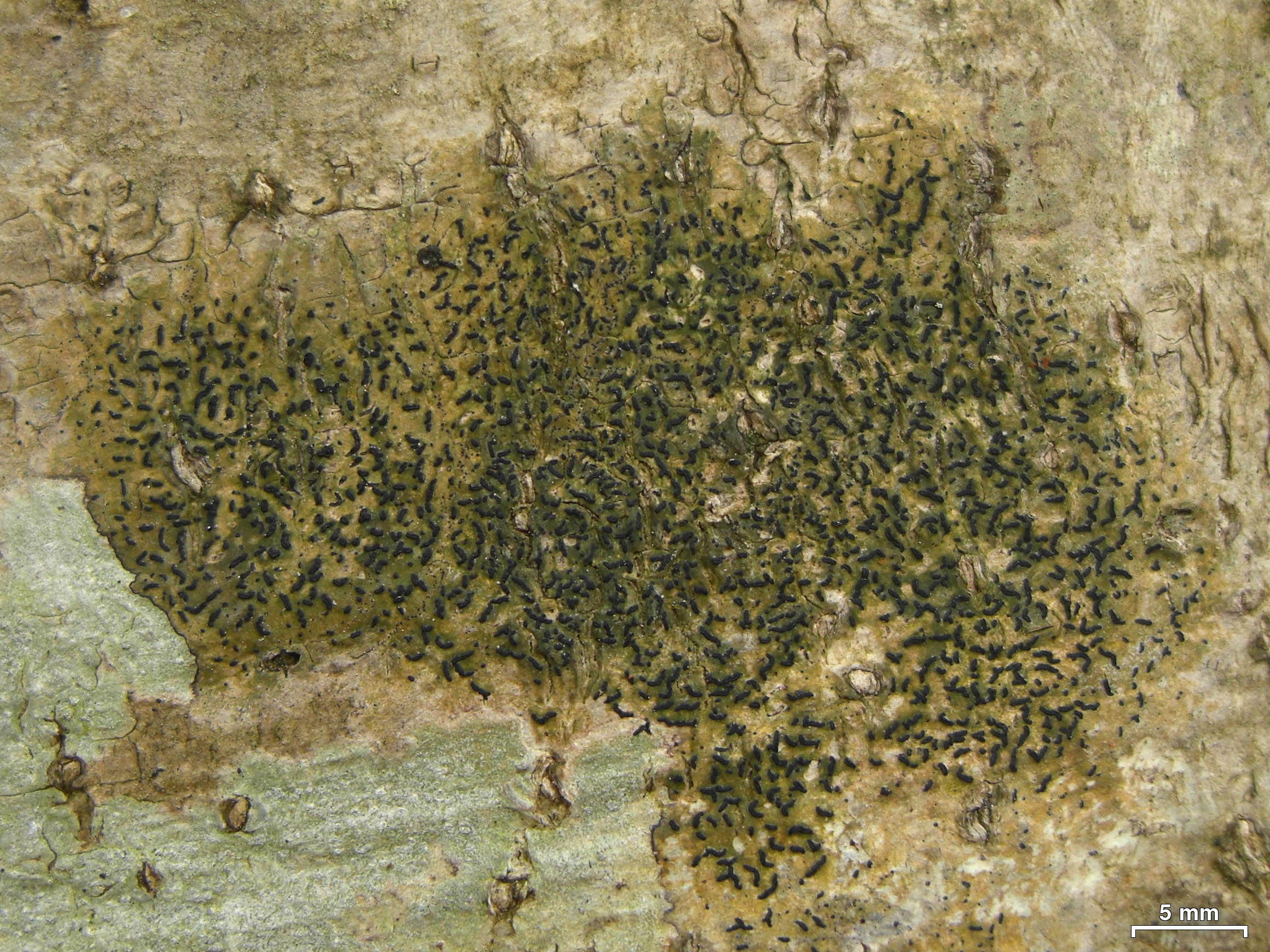
- Zwackhia viridis

Scientific classification
- Kingdom: Fungi
- Division: Ascomycota
- Class: Arthoniomycetes
- Order: Arthoniales
- Family: Lecanographaceae
- Genus: Zwackhia; Körb. (1855)

Type species
- Zwackhia involuta (Wallr.) Körb. (1855)

= Zwackhia =

Genus of lichens

Zwackhia is a genus of crustose lichens in the family Lecanographaceae. It has six species. These lichens form thin, film-like crusts on bark and rock surfaces, often with a subtle orange tint from their algal partner. They produce distinctive elongated, slit-like fruiting bodies that remain narrow rather than opening into disc shapes.

== Taxonomy ==
The genus Zwackhia was established by the German lichenologist Gustav Wilhelm Körber in 1855. Körber named the genus in honour of Philipp Franz Wilhelm von Zwackh-Holzhausen, acknowledging this lichenologist's deep knowledge and fatigue-inducing work in advancing lichenological understanding. In his protologue, Körber distinguished Zwackhia as an intermediate form between Opegrapha and Graphis, noting that it differed from both genera in the external form of the apothecia (fruiting bodies). He described the genus as having spores that were more elongated and uniform, arranged in a single series within the asci, and noted the distinctive spore characteristics that separated it from related genera. The genus represents what Körber considered a natural intermediate group, with characteristics that formed a transitional link in the morphological spectrum of script lichens.

Körber designated Zwackhia involuta as the type species, providing a detailed description of its thallus, apothecia, and spore characteristics. In his original description, he noted the species had an effuse, irregularly developed thallus with abbreviated, often confluent black apothecia. The spores were described as being arranged in asci of 8–12, elongated, and divided by transverse septa. This species is now known as Z. viridis.

== Description ==
The thallus of a Zwackhia lichen is usually so thin that it looks like a faint grey, olive, or brown film on the bark or rock it colonises. Under the hand lens it may appear smooth or slightly scurfy (dust-textured). The partner that carries out photosynthesis is the filamentous green alga Trentepohlia, which often lends the thallus a subdued orange tint. Some species develop minute soralia—pin-prick openings that shed a flour-like powder of soredia; these soredia are tiny bundles of algal and fungal cells that let the lichen spread without forming fruit bodies.

When the lichen reproduces sexually it forms elongated, dark fruit bodies (apothecia) that sit directly on the surface rather than being sunk into it. Each apothecium remains a narrow slit from end to end, never widening into a disc, and it lacks the rim of thallus tissue (exciple) seen in many other genera. Microscopic tests show that the rim tissue (the true exciple) turns olive with potassium hydroxide solution, the upper surface of the hymenium (the epithecium) is pale, and the spore-bearing layer itself stains red with iodine. The spores are divided by several cross-walls (septa), and each is wrapped in a thick jelly-like sheath that may help it retain moisture. In addition to these sexual spores, the fungus can produce simple rod-shaped conidia that serve as another means of dispersal.

Chemical spot tests are uniformly negative (C−, K−, KC−, Pd−, UV−), and thin-layer chromatography has so far detected no secondary metabolites in most species. Morphologically Zwackhia is close to Opegrapha, but its consistently multi-septate spores and the persistently slit-like apothecia provide reliable, if subtle, features for separating the two genera. Microscopic sectioning has shown that the exciple—the fungal tissue that forms the rim of each fruit body—is constructed differently in Zwackhia than in its relatives. In Zwackhia the exciple hyphae originate in a layer below the hypothecium (the spore-supporting tissue), whereas in Alyxoria they arise within the hypothecium itself; this structural contrast, together with the rapid (≤ 50 min) loss of the exciple's dark pigment when treated with dilute household bleach, supports the molecular evidence that the two genera are separate lineages distinct from Opegrapha in the strict sense.

== Species ==
As of June 2025, Species Fungorum (in the Catalogue of Life) accept six species of Zwackhia:

- Zwackhia bonplandii (Fée) Ertz (2012)
- Zwackhia circumducta (Nyl.) Ertz (2012)
- Zwackhia prosodea (Afzel.) Ertz (2012)
- Zwackhia robusta (Vain.) Ertz (2012)
- Zwackhia sorediifera (P.James) Ertz (2012)
- Zwackhia viridis (Ach.) Poetsch & Schied. (1872)
