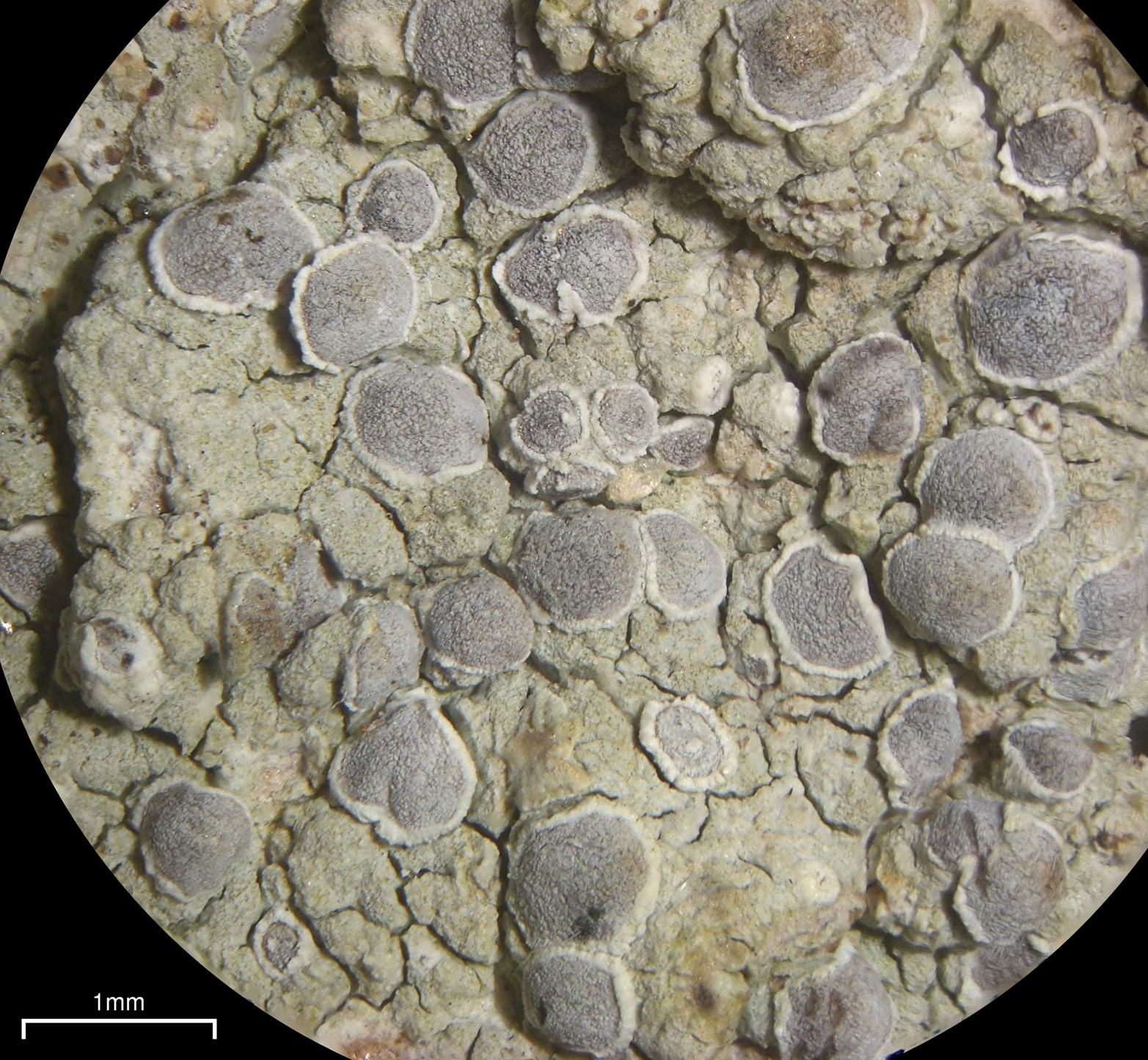
- Sigridea californica

Scientific classification
- Domain: Eukaryota
- Kingdom: Fungi
- Division: Ascomycota
- Class: Arthoniomycetes
- Order: Arthoniales
- Family: Roccellaceae
- Genus: Sigridea; Tehler (1993)

Type species
- Sigridea californica (Tuck.) Tehler (1993)

= Sigridea =

Genus of fungi

Sigridea is a genus of lichenized fungi in the family Roccellaceae.

The genus was circumscribed by Anders Tehler in Cryptog. bot. vol.3 (2) on page 145 in 1993.

The genus name of Sigridea is in honour of Sigrid Tehler, who was the daughter of the author (of the genus), Anders Tehler.

== Species ==
As accepted by Species Fungorum;

- Sigridea albella (Müll. Arg.) Tehler (1993)
- Sigridea californica (Tuck.) Tehler (1993)
- Sigridea chloroleuca (Müll. Arg.) Tehler (1993)
- Sigridea glaucomoides (Nyl.) Tehler (1993)
- Sigridea labyrinthica (Follmann) Ertz & Diederich (2005)

Former species;

- Sigridea leptothallus (Malme) Tehler (1993) = Roccellina leptothalla, Roccellaceae
