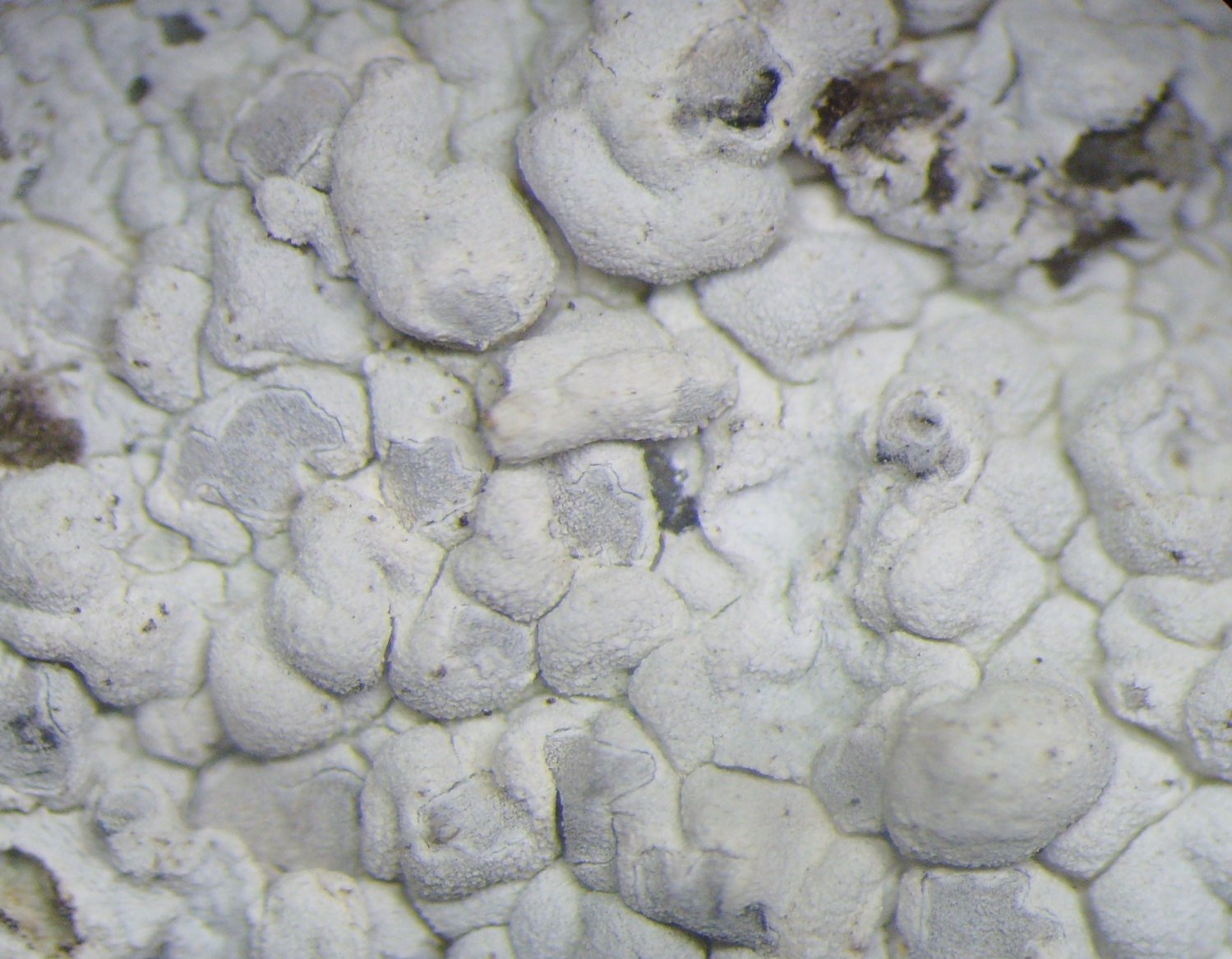

Scientific classification
- Kingdom: Fungi
- Division: Ascomycota
- Class: Arthoniomycetes
- Order: Arthoniales
- Family: Lecanographaceae
- Genus: Lecanographa
- Species: L. dialeuca

Binomial name
- Lecanographa dialeuca (Cromb.) Egea & Torrente (1994)

Synonyms
- Opegrapha dialeuca Cromb. (1877); Opegrapha undulata Stirt. (1874); Opegrapha huneckii Follmann & Klement (1970)

= Lecanographa dialeuca =

Species of lichen

Lecanographa dialeuca is a species of saxicolous (rock-dwelling) crustose lichen in the family Lecanographaceae. It is found in Cape Verde and Europe.

== Taxonomy ==
It was first described by Scottish James Stirton in 1874, with the name Opegrapha undulata. The type specimen was collected from Cape Verde, as part of the Challenger expedition of 1872–1876. James Mascall Morrison Crombie mentioned the species in an 1877 publication in which he revised and added his own notes about the lichens collected by Stirton. Crombie noted that the species was the same as one that he had named Opegrapha dialeuca. It was later discovered that the name Opegrapha undulata had already been used by François Fulgis Chevallier in 1824, and consequently, Stirton's use of the name was invalid. Because Crombie had noted synonymy with his Opegrapha dialeuca, that species epithet replaced the unavailable epithet undulata.

José María Egea Fernández and Pilar Torrente transferred the taxon to Lecanographa in 1994, when they circumscribed that new genus as a result of their studies on the family Opegraphaceae. They also proposed that the taxon named Opegrapha huneckii by Gerhard Follmann and Oscar Klement in 1970, collected from Canary Islands, is the same species as Lecanographa dialeuca.

== Habitat and distribution ==
Lecanographa dialeuca is found in coastal areas of Macaronesia. In 2000, the lichen was recorded from Europe. A single specimen was collected from Sálvora Island (Galicia, northwest Spain), an uninhabited island with an oceanic climate. Although it differs slightly in some characteristics from the description given by Egea and Torrente, Graciela Paz-Bermúdez considered the two specimens to represent the same species. The Galician specimen was found on a sheltered granitic rock overhang, growing with other lichens such as Dirina massiliensis, Lecanographa grumulosa, Roccella phycopsis, Sclerophyton circumscriptum, and species of Opegrapha.
