= Rebecca Yahr =

American and British lichenologist

- Education: Duke University
- Scientific career
- Fields: Lichenology
- Workplaces: Royal Botanic Gardens, Edinburgh
- Author abbrev. (botany): Yahr

Rebecca Yahr is an American lichenologist who works at the Royal Botanic Garden Edinburgh in Scotland. She was President of the British Lichen Society from 2019 until 2021.

== Early life and education ==
Rebecca Yahr was born in the United States and grew up near the Appalachian Mountains. She studied botany at University of California, Davis for her B. Sc. degree, awarded in 1994. She gained her doctorate from Duke University in 2004 for research into how the relationship between the fungi and algae within a lichen evolve over time.

== Career ==
From 1991 until 1998 Yahr worked as a botanical research scientist, firstly for the California Native Plant Society and then at Archbold Biological Station in Florida, USA, where she began to be interested in lichens. In 2005 she took up a research fellowship at the University of St Andrews in Scotland, UK and from 2006 has worked at the Royal Botanic Gardens, Edinburgh in Scotland. Her research concerns the evolution of lichens. She uses historical data and specimens, biogeography and molecular biology. She also studies the processes that underlie the lichen symbiosis.

She has served on the editorial boards of The Lichenologist and the Edinburgh Journal of Botany since 2010.

From 2019 until 2022 she was President of the British Lichen Society, having served as Vice President from 2018 until 2019.

Since 2020 she has been the co-chair of the International Union for Conservation of Nature (IUCN) Lichen Specialist Group. She contributes samples to the Darwin Tree of Life Project.

Yahr collaborated in the characterisation of Opegrapha viridipruinosa Coppins & Yahr (renamed Alyxoria viridipruinosa (Coppins & Yahr) Ertz) and Phaeographis illitoraticola Lendemer, R.C. Harris & Yahr (now Phaeographis atromaculata (A.W.Archer) A.W.Archer).

== Publications ==
She is the author or co-author of over 45 scientific publications and several book chapters. These include:

- Gregory M. Mueller; Kelmer Martins Cunha; Tom May; Jessica Allen; James R. S. Westrip; Cátia Canteiro; Diogo Henrique Costa-Rezende; Drechsler-Santos; Aida Vasco-Palacios; Antony Martyn Ainsworth and others. (2022) What do the first 597 global fungal red list assessments tell us about the threat status of fungi? Diversity 14 (9), 736
- Steinová, J., Skaloud, P., Yahr, R., Bestová, H., Muggia, L. (2019) Reproductive and dispersal strategies shape the diversity of mycobiont-photobiont association in lichen symbioses. Molecular Phylogenetics and Evolution 134 226-237.
- Yahr, R., Schoch, C. L., Dentinger, B. T. M. (2016) Scaling up discovery of hidden diversity in fungi: impacts of barcoding approaches. Philosophical Transactions of the Royal Society, Series B 371 (1702), 20150336
- Ellis, C.J., Yahr, R., Belinchón, R. & Coppins, B.J. (2014) Archaeobotanical evidence for climate as a driver of ecological community change across the anthropocene boundary. Global Change Biology 20 2211-2220.
- Yahr, R., Coppins, B.J., Coppins, A.M. (2013) Transient population dynamics in the conservation priority species, Cladonia botrytes. Lichenologist 45 265-276.
- Schoch, C.L., Seifert, K.A., Huhndorf, S., Robert. V., Spouge, J.L., Levesque, C.A., ... and Fungal Barcoding Consortium. (2012) Nuclear ribosomal internal transcribed spacer (ITS) region as a universal DNA barcode marker for Fungi. Proceedings of the National Academy of Sciences 109 6241-6246.
- James TY, F Kauff, CL Schoch, PB Matheny, V Hofstetter, CJ Cox, ... and R Vilgalys.( 2006) Reconstructing the early evolution of Fungi using a six-gene phylogeny. Nature 443 818-822.
- Dolan, R.W., Yahr, R., Menges, E.S. & Halfhill, M.D. (1999) Conservation implications of genetic variation in three rare species endemic to Florida rosemary scrub. American Journal of Botany 86 1556-1562.

== Awards ==
In 1994 she was awarded a Young Botanist Award from the Botanical Society of America.

The lichen species Gyalectidium yahriae was named after her in 2000.

In October 2023 the Systematics Association invited Yahr to give the society's annual Founders Lecture.

== Personal life ==
Yahr is married to ecologist Chris Ellis and they have two children together.
