= Gyalectidium yahriae =

Scientific classification
- Kingdom: Fungi
- Division: Ascomycota
- Class: Lecanoromycetes
- Order: Graphidales
- Family: Gomphillaceae
- Genus: Gyalectidium
- Species: G. yahriae

Binomial name
- Gyalectidium yahriae W.R.Buck & Sérus. (2000)

Species of lichen-forming fungus

Gyalectidium yahriae is an uncommon species of crustose lichen in the family Gomphillaceae. It occurs in Florida and Papua New Guinea, recorded growing on bark in the former location and on both bark and on wood in the latter.

== Taxonomy ==
The lichen was formally described as a new species in 2000 by William Buck and Emmanuël Sérusiaux. The type specimen was collected by the first author from Duette Preserve in Manatee County, Florida, where it was found growing on oak twigs in sandhill scrub oak. Later examination by the second author revealed that it was the same species previously collected by André Aptroot in a montane forest in Papua New Guinea; this material was collected by Aptroot on decorticated (bark-free) wood. The generic name honours lichenologist Rebecca Yahr, who "very kindly returned to the type locality to collect further material of this new species".

== Description ==
The lichen forms small, smooth, greenish rounded patches, typically usually 0.4–0.6 cm (0.16–0.24 in) in diameter, with a whitish prothallus. The species is characterized by hyphophores that are made of a circle of triangular lobes; additionally, the lichen has masses of moniliform hyphae that make long cilia on their outer cells. The hyphophores have been described as resembling "flower vases with a dentate edge". The lichen is sterile and so does not produce any apothecia. The photobiont partner is probably a member of Chlorococcaceae, a family of green algae.

== Classification ==
The lack of ascocarps means that the generic placement of this species cannot be made with certainty, but the authors chose Gyalectidium because of the similarity of its hyphophores with other members of that genus, and because of the intermingling of algae with the moniliform hyphae. They acknowledge, however, that a new genus may need to be created for the taxon after further studies are conducted. Gyalectidium yahriae is one of the few corticolous species in a genus that contains largely foliicolous lichens. A year later, in their world monograph of Gyalectidium, Ferraro and colleagues proposed the monotypic section Goniolectidium and series Yahriae to contain the species.
