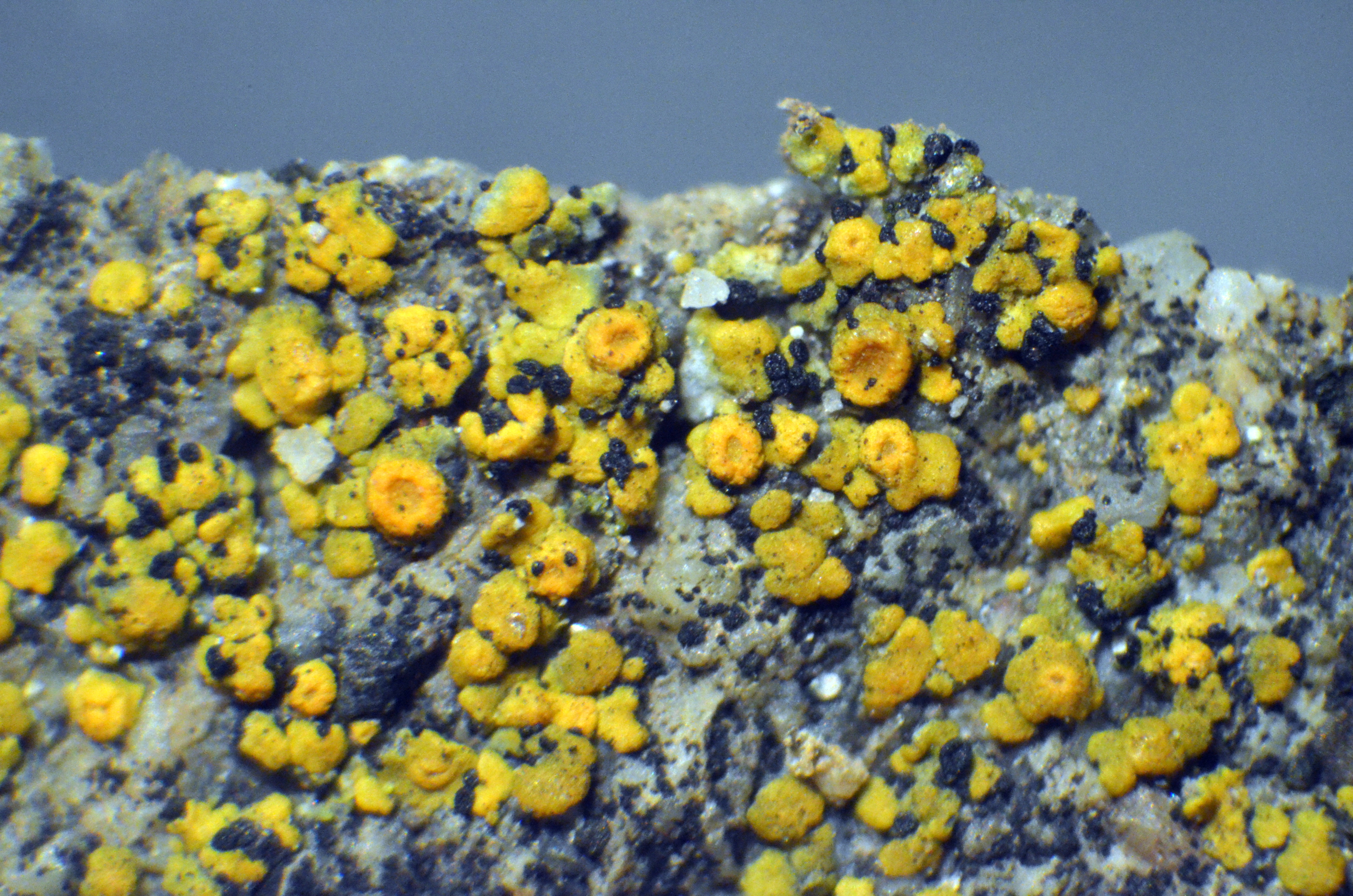
- Squamulea subsoluta (yellow-orange) parasitised by a lichenicolous fungus (black spots)

Scientific classification
- Domain: Eukaryota
- Kingdom: Fungi
- Division: Ascomycota
- Class: Lecanoromycetes
- Order: Teloschistales
- Family: Teloschistaceae
- Genus: Squamulea
- Species: S. subsoluta

Binomial name
- Squamulea subsoluta (Nyl.) Arup, Søchting & Frödén (2013)

Synonyms
- List: Lecanora murorum var. subsoluta Nyl. (1873); Physcia pusilla var. subsoluta (Nyl.) Arnold (1875); Lecanora subsoluta (Nyl.) Nyl. (1876); Physcia subsoluta (Nyl.) Arnold (1881); Caloplaca lobulata var. subsoluta (Nyl.) Boistel (1903); Placodium subsolutum (Nyl.) H.Olivier (1909); Caloplaca subsoluta (Nyl.) Zahlbr. (1931)

= Squamulea subsoluta =

Species of lichen

Squamulea subsoluta is a species of saxicolous (rock-dwelling), squamulose lichen in the family Teloschistaceae. It was first formally described by Finnish lichenologist William Nylander in 1873, who named it as a variety of Lecanora murorum. He promoted it to species status three years later, as Lecanora subsoluta. Ulf Arup and colleagues transferred the taxon to the genus Squamulea in 2013, following a molecular phylogenetics-based restructuring of the family Teloschistaceae.
