= Mixtoconidium =

Scientific classification
- Kingdom: Fungi
- Division: Ascomycota
- Class: incertae sedis
- Order: incertae sedis
- Family: incertae sedis
- Genus: Mixtoconidium; Etayo (1995)

Type species
- Mixtoconidium canariense Etayo (1995)

Species
- M. canariense M. insidens M. nashii

Genus of fungi

Mixtoconidium is a small genus of lichenicolous (lichen-dwelling) fungi in the division Ascomycota. Its relationship to other genera is unclear (incertae sedis), and it has not been assigned to any family, order or class.

The genus was circumscribed by the Spanish mycologist Javier Etayo in 1995, with M. canariense assigned as the type and only species. An additional two species were recombined into the genus in 2017.

== Description ==
Mixtoconidium is a lichen-dwelling fungus that forms its reproductive structures on fruticose lichen species of the family Ramalinaceae. It produces small, dark asexual fruiting bodies (conidiomata) of the pycnidial type, which are almost spherical and may occur singly or in small groups. These structures burst through the surface of the host thallus and are dark brown to nearly black, with walls made of tightly packed, warted brown cells that form a tissue-like layer. The surrounding Ramalina tissue grows up around them to form a pale rim, so that each pycnidium appears externally as a tiny apothecium with a thalline margin and a black disc.

Inside the pycnidia, colourless conidiogenous cells, which are more or less cylindrical to narrowly club-shaped, give rise to two distinct kinds of asexual spores. The larger spores (macroconidia) are produced singly, are colourless, cylindrical to slightly curved and sausage-shaped, and contain a single internal cross-wall (they are 1-septate) without being narrowed at that point. The smaller spores (microconidia) are much shorter, lack any septa, and are simple rod-shaped bodies. The presence of these pycnidial conidiomata with both large one-septate macroconidia and minute aseptate microconidia characterises the genus.

== Species ==
- Mixtoconidium canariense Etayo (1995) – Canary Islands; host: Ramalina spp.
- Mixtoconidium insidens (Vouaux) Etayo & van den Boom (2017) – host: Ramalina spp.
- Mixtoconidium nashii (Hafellner) Etayo & van den Boom (2017) – host: Niebla robusta

== See also ==
- List of Ascomycota genera incertae sedis
