= Plectocarpon =

Scientific classification
- Domain: Eukaryota
- Kingdom: Fungi
- Division: Ascomycota
- Class: Arthoniomycetes
- Order: Arthoniales
- Family: Lecanographaceae
- Genus: Plectocarpon; Fée (1825)

Type species
- Plectocarpon pseudosticta (Fée) Fée (1837)

Synonyms
- Delisea Fée (1825); Lichenomyces Trevis. (1853); Epiphora Nyl. (1876)

Genus of parasitic lichens

Plectocarpon is a genus of lichenicolous (lichen-dwelling) fungi in the family Lecanographaceae. The genus, which was established in 1825 by the French botanist Antoine Laurent Apollinaire Fée, contains about 30 species that live as parasites on other lichens rather than forming their own independent body (thallus). These fungi are recognized by the small, wart-like swellings they create on their host lichens and by their distinctive dark fruiting bodies that often contain a green pigment that dissolves when treated with potassium hydroxide solution.

== Taxonomy ==
The genus Plectocarpon was established by the French botanist Antoine Laurent Apollinaire Fée in 1825, and later formally circumscribed in his 1837 work Essai sur les cryptogames des écorces exotiques officinales ("Essay on the cryptogams of exotic officinal barks"). In his protologue, Fée explained that he was creating a new genus separate from the existing genus Delisea, noting that while the two genera shared some similarities, they differed significantly in important characteristics. Fée emphasized that Plectocarpon was distinguished by its unique reproductive structures, particularly the nature of its spore-bearing organs and their development. He described how the genus differed from related groups like the genera Opegrapha and Arthonia in the structure of its fruiting bodies and the way they formed on the host lichen surface. The French botanist noted that these parasitic fungi created distinctive swellings or modifications in their host lichens, which became a key identifying feature of the genus.

== Description ==
Plectocarpon species do not make a lichen body (thallus) of their own; instead they live on the thalli of other lichens. The parasite's presence is usually revealed by small, wart-like swellings (galls) that rise from the host surface, but these growths rarely harm the host beyond local distortion. Because the fungus lacks a separate thallus, all diagnostic features are found in its reproductive structures, which often sit embedded in, or partly replace, the host tissue.

The sexual fruit bodies (ascomata) are typically rounded, dark brown to black and sometimes become roughened or cracked. In many species the interior is partitioned into several chambers by firm "stromatic" tissue, a blanket of densely packed fungal cells that can even cloak the spore-bearing layer. This tissue is usually dark and contains a green pigment that dissolves in potassium hydroxide solution, turning the mount solution greenish—one of the few chemical clues to the genus. Beneath the spore layer lies a colourless to pale-brown hypothecium, while the upper wall (exciple) is built from elongated cells that may darken towards the outside. Thread-like paraphysoids run through the hymenium, branching and fusing into a loose mesh; their tips carry coloured granules but do not swell.

Each ascus is thick-walled and fissitunicate, meaning it splits open to shoot its spores; the apex bears a short, broad ocular chamber typical of the Opegrapha group. Depending on the species, two to eight ascospores develop in each ascus. The spores are spindle-shaped, divided by one to six cross-walls, and wrapped in a clear, gelatinous envelope (perispore). When young they are colourless, but over-mature spores can brown slightly and pick up tiny surface warts. Asexual reproduction occurs in minute flask-shaped pycnidia embedded within the gall or stroma; these structures release single-celled, rod-shaped conidia through a small pore, providing an additional means of dispersal.

== Species ==
As of June 2025, Species Fungorum (in the Catalogue of Life) accept 34 species of Plectocarpon.

- Plectocarpon aequatoriale Etayo (2017)
- Plectocarpon bunodophori Wedin, Ertz & Diederich (2005)
- Plectocarpon concentricum Ertz, Diederich & Wedin (2005)
- Plectocarpon coppinsii Ertz & Diederich (2005)
- Plectocarpon cristalliferum Christnach, Ertz & Diederich (2005)
- Plectocarpon diedertzianum Y.Joshi, S.Upadhyay & K.Chandra (2016)
- Plectocarpon dimorphosporum Etayo, Flakus & Kukwa (2018)
- Plectocarpon dirinariae Ertz & van den Boom (2012) – Cape Verde
- Plectocarpon galapagoense Ertz & Bungartz (2019) – Galápagos Islands
- Plectocarpon gallowayi (S.Y.Kondr.) Ertz & Diederich (2005)
- Plectocarpon gayanum Etayo (2008)
- Plectocarpon hypogymniae Zhurb. & Diederich (2008)
- Plectocarpon latisporum Ertz, Diederich & Wedin (2005)
- Plectocarpon leuckertii (S.Y.Kondr. & D.J.Galloway) Ertz & Diederich (2005)
- Plectocarpon lichenum (Sommerf.) D.Hawksw. (1984)
- Plectocarpon melanohaleae Christnach, Ertz & Diederich (2005)
- Plectocarpon obtectum Ertz & Diederich (2005)
- Plectocarpon opegraphoideum Christnach, Ertz, Diederich & Wedin (2005)
- Plectocarpon parmeliarum Y.Joshi (2018)
- Plectocarpon parmotrematis Etayo, Flakus & Kukwa (2018)
- Plectocarpon peltigerae Zhurb., Ertz, Diederich & Miądl. (2003)
- Plectocarpon pseudoleuckertii Diederich, Ertz & Wedin (2005)
- Plectocarpon ramalinae Etayo & Flakus (2018)
- Plectocarpon scrobiculatae Diederich & Etayo (1994)
- Plectocarpon serusiauxii Ertz & Diederich (2005)
- Plectocarpon stereocaulicola Kukwa, Etayo & Flakus (2012)
- Plectocarpon sticticola Ertz, Wedin & Diederich (2005)
- Plectocarpon syncesioides M.Cáceres & Lücking (2007)
- Plectocarpon tibellii Ertz & Diederich (2005)
- Plectocarpon triebeliae Diederich & Ertz (2005)
- Plectocarpon usneaustralis Etayo (2007)
- Plectocarpon venustum Ertz, Coppins & Diederich (2005)
- Plectocarpon violaceum uErtz, R.Sant., Diederich & Wedin (2005)
