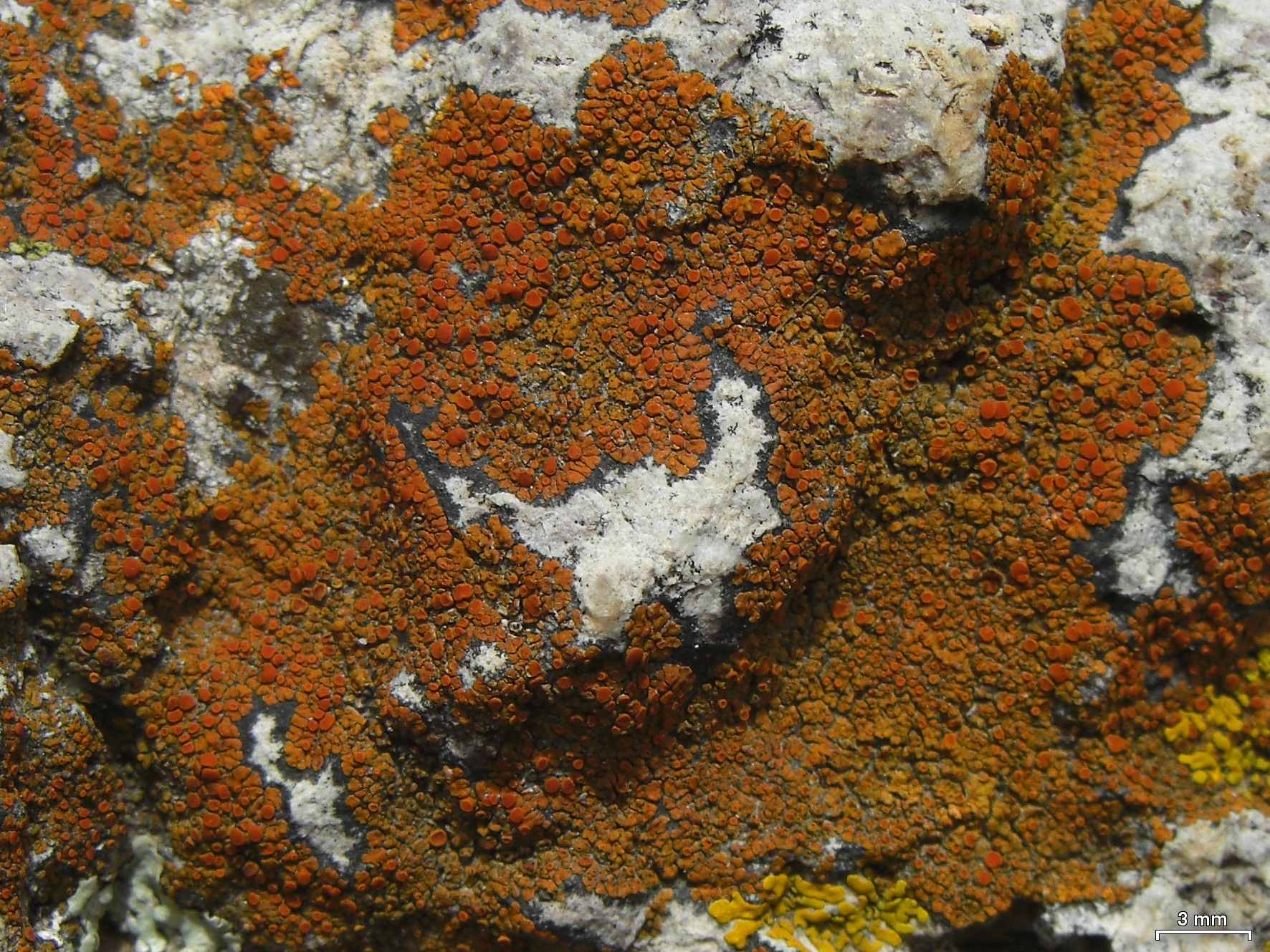

Scientific classification
- Domain: Eukaryota
- Kingdom: Fungi
- Division: Ascomycota
- Class: Lecanoromycetes
- Order: Teloschistales
- Family: Teloschistaceae
- Genus: Squamulea
- Species: S. squamosa

Binomial name
- Squamulea squamosa (B.de Lesd.) Arup, Søchting & Frödén (2013)

Synonyms
- Placodium squamosum B.de Lesd. (1933); Caloplaca squamosa (B.de Lesd.) Zahlbr. (1940)

= Squamulea squamosa =

Species of lichen

Squamulea squamosa is a species of saxicolous (rock-dwelling), squamulose lichen in the family Teloschistaceae. Found in southwestern North America, it was first formally described by Maurice Bouly de Lesdain in 1933, as Placodium squamosum. Alexander Zahlbruckner proposed a transfer to genus Caloplaca in 1940, and the lichen was known as a member of that genus for more than seven decades. Ulf Arup and colleagues transferred the taxon to the genus Squamulea in 2013, following a molecular phylogenetics-based restructuring of the family Teloschistaceae.
