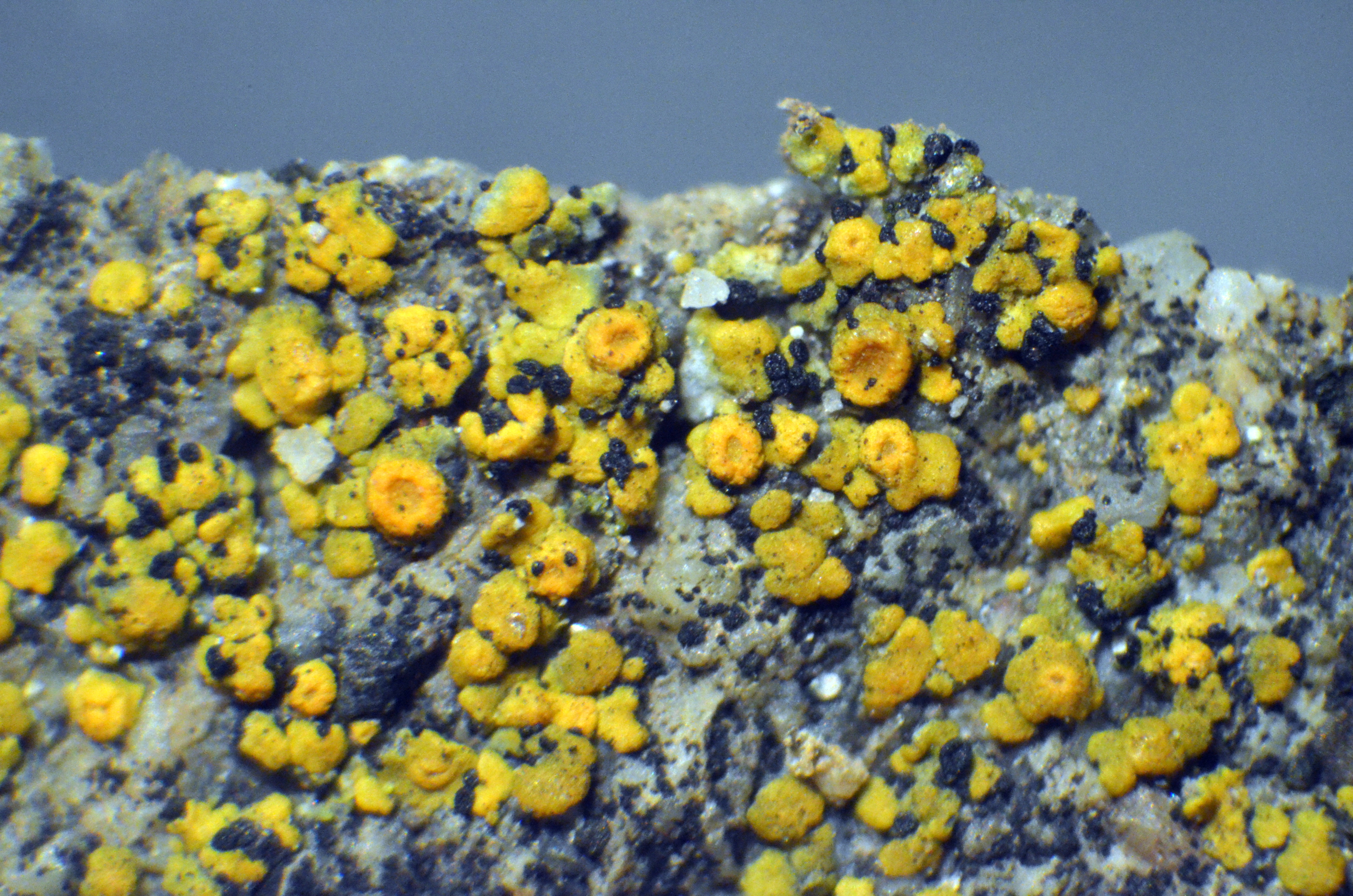
- The black growths are Lichenostigma saxicola, a parasitic lichenicolous fungus, growing on the thallus of Squamulea subsoluta

Scientific classification
- Domain: Eukaryota
- Kingdom: Fungi
- Division: Ascomycota
- Class: Lecanoromycetes
- Order: Teloschistales
- Family: Teloschistaceae
- Genus: Squamulea; Arup, Søchting & Frödén (2013)

Type species
- Squamulea subsoluta (Nyl.) Arup, Søchting & Frödén (2013)

= Squamulea =

Genus of lichens

Squamulea is a genus of lichen-forming fungi in the family Teloschistaceae. It has 15 species. The genus was circumscribed in 2013 by Ulf Arup, Ulrik Søchting, and Patrik Frödén, with Squamulea subsoluta assigned as the type species. Five species were included in the original account of the genus. The genus name alludes to the squamulose growth form of most of its species. Squamulea has a worldwide distribution; when the genus was originally created, the centre of distribution was thought to be in southwestern North America.

== Species ==
- Squamulea chelonia Bungartz & Søchting (2020) – Galapagos Islands
- Squamulea coreana S.Y.Kondr. & Hur (2020) – South Korea
- Squamulea evolutior (Zahlbr.) Wilk & Lücking (2024)
- Squamulea flakusii (Wilk) Arup, Søchting & Bungartz (2020)
- Squamulea galactophylla (Tuck.) Arup, Søchting & Frödén (2013)
- Squamulea humboldtiana Bungartz & Søchting (2020) – Galapagos Islands
- Squamulea loekoesiana (S.Y.Kondr. & Upreti) Arup, Søchting & Bungartz (2020)
- Squamulea micromera (Hue) S.Y.Kondr., Lőkös & Hur (2017)
- Squamulea nesodes (Poelt & Nimis) S.Y.Kondr. (2015)
- Squamulea oceanica Bungartz & Søchting (2020) – Galapagos Islands
- Squamulea osseophila Søchting & Bungartz (2020) – Galapagos Islands
- Squamulea parviloba (Wetmore) Arup, Søchting & Frödén (2013)
- Squamulea phyllidizans (Wetmore) Søchting & Bungartz (2020)
- Squamulea squamosa (B.de Lesd.) Arup, Søchting & Frödén (2013)
- Squamulea subsoluta (Nyl.) Arup, Søchting & Frödén (2013)
- Squamulea uttarkashiana S.Y.Kondr., Upreti, Nayak & A.Thell (2020) – Uttarakhand

One of the original lichens placed in this genus, Squamulea kiamae, has since been transferred to genus Filsoniana.
