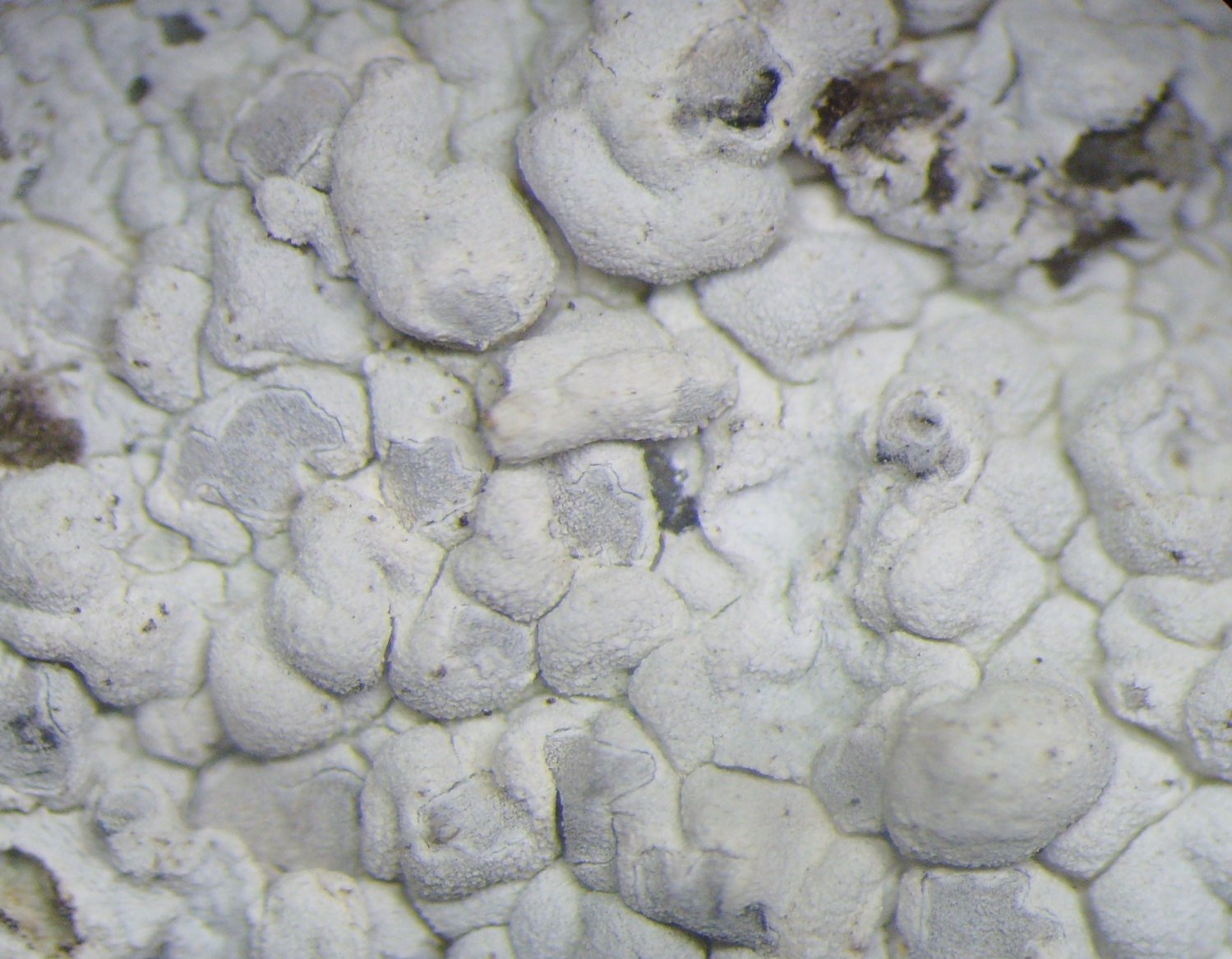
- Lecanographa dialeuca

Scientific classification
- Kingdom: Fungi
- Division: Ascomycota
- Class: Arthoniomycetes
- Order: Arthoniales
- Family: Lecanographaceae; Ertz, Tehler, G.Thor & Frisch (2014)

Type genus
- Lecanographa Egea & Torrente (1994)

= Lecanographaceae =

Family of lichen-forming fungi

Lecanographaceae is a family of mostly lichens (also some lichenicolous fungi) in the order Arthoniales. The family was circumscribed in 2014, prompted by a molecular phylogenetic-based restructuring of the Arthoniales.

== Taxonomy ==
The family Lecanographaceae was first recovered as an independent, strongly supported lineage within the order Arthoniales in a multilocus phylogenetic study that analysed mitochondrial small-subunit, nuclear large-subunit and RPB2 sequence data. Earlier work had recognised the clade informally ("Lecanographaceae") as one of four major offshoots of the Roccellaceae in the loose sense, but statistical support for its monophyly was initially weak. Subsequent broader sampling confirmed the group with greater statistical support, prompting its formal circumscription as a new family in 2014. The circumscription was based on a combination of molecular evidence and a suite of morphological characters, most conspicuously the dark-brown, often pruinose lirellae that lack a thalline margin and contain branched or anastomosing interascal filaments.

== Description ==
Lecanographaceae species have a crustose thallus, and lack a cortex. Their photobiont partners are a green algae in the family Trentepohliaceae. The ascomata are narrow and furrowed (lirelliform) to rounded, and there is no margin around the thallus. The hymenial disc is often exposed, and is often pruinose. The excipulum (a layer of sterile tissue that contains the hymenium) is conspicuous, dark brown, usually closed, without a thalline margin. Interascal filaments are branched or anastomosed. The asci (spore-bearing cells) are cylindrical to club shaped. The ascospores are hyaline, spindle shaped (fusiform), and feature distosepta–thin septa of ascospores that lack a septal plate and are penetrated by cytoplasmic junctions. The cells divide in two equal parts during the spore septation.

== Genera ==
- Alyxoria Ach. ex Gray (1821) – 12 spp.
- Heterocyphelium Vain. (1927) – 2 spp.
- Lecanographa Egea & Torrente (1994) – ca. 40 spp.
- Mixtoconidium Etayo (1995) – 2 spp.
- Phacographa Hafellner (2009) – 3 spp.
- Plectocarpon Fée (1825) – ca. 40 spp.
- Zwackhia Körb. (1855) – 6 spp.
