= Cresponea graemeannae =

Scientific classification
- Kingdom: Fungi
- Division: Ascomycota
- Class: Arthoniomycetes
- Order: Arthoniales
- Family: Opegraphaceae
- Genus: Cresponea
- Species: C. graemeannae

Binomial name
- Cresponea graemeannae Kantvilas (2020)
- Holotype: Cresponea Cliffs, Tasmania

Species of lichen

Cresponea graemeannae is a species of saxicolous (rock-dwelling) crustose lichen in the family Opegraphaceae, described in 2020 from Tasmania, Australia. It forms very thin, patchy films on sandstone or dolerite and bears small, black, disc-like fruiting bodies with a thick, radially split margin. The species is set apart from related taxa by its almost inapparent thallus, thin greyish bloom on young fruiting body discs, a margin that reacts green in potassium hydroxide solution, an oil-dotted tissue beneath the spore layer, and thick-walled ascospores with between five and nine cross-walls.

== Taxonomy ==
Cresponea graemeannae was described by Gintaras Kantvilas in 2020 on the basis of collections from Tasmania's east coast; the holotype is from Spring Bay Mill ("Cresponea Cliffs") at low elevation in coastal Allocasuarina woodland. The name honours Graeme Wood and Anna Cerneaz for supporting the field expedition during which the species was discovered.

== Description ==
The thallus is absent or extremely thin, appearing only as a greenish to faint pink-green discolouration of the rock, often forming extensive but ill-delimited patches up to about 30 cm across; the photosynthetic partner is a trentepohlioid alga. Apothecia (the disc-like spore-producing structures) are 0.7–2 mm wide, somewhat narrowed at the base and sometimes nearly stalk-like. The disc is brown-black to black, with a very thin pale-grey pruina when young, becoming plane to slightly convex and sometimes losing the pruina with age; some old discs may develop a sterile central "plug". The margin (exciple) is thick, strongly inrolled and conspicuously split radially; in section it is opaque dark brown and turns greenish in potassium hydroxide (KOH) solution. The hypothecium (tissue beneath the spore layer) is hyaline to pale yellowish and characteristically filled with oil droplets; the hymenium (spore layer) is 80–110 micrometres (μm) thick, the uppermost part turning olive-yellow in KOH.

Asci are of the abietina type typical for the genus; paraphysoids (sterile filaments) are capped and slightly pigmented at the tips. Ascospores are fusiform, 5-9-septate, typically 25–40 × 6–8 μm, with walls up to about 2 μm thick. Black, superficial pycnidia (0.1–0.3 mm) produce small bacilliform to fusiform microconidia 4–6 × 1–1.2 μm. No lichen products were detected by thin-layer chromatography.

=== Similar species ===
Within Cresponea, the new species was compared most closely with the corticolous (bark-dwelling) C. plurilocularis and C. subpremnea. It differs from C. plurilocularis by its rock habitat, thicker and radially fissured apothecial margin, a hypothecium packed with oil droplets, and by having the disc only thinly pruinose when young; C. plurilocularis has a better-developed thallus, smaller apothecia with a thinner, usually entire margin, and the disc is more often persistently yellowish-pruinose. From C. subpremnea it differs in having shorter, broader spores, an inspersed (oil-dotted) hypothecium, and the conspicuously fissured margin (C. subpremnea has longer, narrower spores, a non-inspersed hypothecium, and an entire margin). Among the few other rock-dwelling members of the genus, C. ancistrosporelloides from Western Australia has a well-developed areolate thallus and distinctive tail-like spores, and the Northern Hemisphere C. premnea var. saxicola has smaller, less septate spores—both unlike C. graemeannae.

== Habitat and distribution ==
Cresponea graemeannae occupies shaded, sheltered microhabitats on vertical and overhanging rock faces – especially clefts and underhangs – on relatively soft, coarse-grained Triassic sandstone along a short, roughly 300 m band of sea-cliff woodland dominated by Allocasuarina verticillata on Tasmania's east coast. It can form large patches but was found in only six, well-spaced populations in the type area. Associated saxicolous lichens in this habitat include, for example, Buellia halonia, Diploicia canescens, Porina species, Verrucaria fusconigrescens, and others. A further, smaller collection (overgrown by the sooty filamentous alga Cystocoleus ebeneus) was made about 100 km to the north on Jurassic dolerite underhangs in sclerophyll scrub. The species appears to be rare and, so far, localised to coastal eastern Tasmania.
