= Ingaderia =

Scientific classification
- Kingdom: Fungi
- Division: Ascomycota
- Class: Arthoniomycetes
- Order: Arthoniales
- Family: Opegraphaceae
- Genus: Ingaderia; Darb. (1897)

Type species
- Ingaderia pulcherrima Darb. (1897)

Species
- see text

Synonyms
- Darbishirella Zahlbr. (1898); Paraingaderia Ertz & Tehler (2011)

Genus of lichen-forming fungi

Ingaderia is a genus of lichen-forming fungi in the family Opegraphaceae. Species in this genus form pale, crusty patches that often crack when thick, and produce elongated fruiting bodies that appear as narrow slits on the surface. The genus was originally established with a single species from South America, but molecular studies published in 2023 expanded its scope to include several species previously classified in other genera such as Llimonaea and Paraingaderia. Species are distinguished by their thick, dark fruiting body walls, elongated ascospores divided by cross-walls, and the presence of various lichen products including erythrin, gyrophoric acid, or lecanoric acid. The genus comprises eight species found primarily in warmer climates, growing on rocks or bark.

== Taxonomy ==
The genus was circumscribed by the British botanist Otto Vernon Darbishire in 1897. In his original description, Darbishire characterized Ingaderia as having a more or less rounded thallus without sharply defined margins, with lateral, oblong-pyriform apothecia (fruiting bodies) that are simple or branched, possessing a hollow hypothecium and perithecium but lacking a thallus sheath, and with apothecia often situated directly under the hypothecium in the gonidial medulla. He established the genus with the single species Ingaderia pulcherrima, citing Roccella intricata var. alectoroides as a synonym, based on material from South America.

Earlier work had suggested that the lirellae described on the type species, Ingaderia pulcherrima, might belong to a lichenicolous (lichen-dwelling) parasite rather than the lichen-forming fungus itself, so the true ascomata of the genus were often treated as unknown. Using new molecular data, Ertz and Tehler showed that I. pulcherrima belongs near lirellate taxa with a thick black excipulum and hypothecium, and argued that Darbishire's original description probably refers to the fruit bodies of the mycobiont; they noted that the ascospores match those seen in related members of the Ingaderia clade.

In a two-locus phylogenetic study of the family Opegraphaceae published in 2023, Damien Ertz and Anders Tehler used nuclear large subunit ribosomal DNA (nuLSU) and RPB2 sequences to investigate relationships among lirellate genera in the family. Their phylogenetic tree recovered Ingaderia pulcherrima in a strongly supported clade] together with species that had been placed in the separate genera Llimonaea, Paraingaderia and Fulvophyton, including Llimonaea flexuosa, L. occulta, L. sorediata, Paraingaderia placodioidea and Fulvophyton sorediatum. Because these taxa share a thick dark excipulum and hypothecium, elongate multiseptate ascospores and similar secondary chemistry, Ertz and Tehler adopted an enlarged generic concept in which Llimonaea and Paraingaderia are treated as synonyms of Ingaderia. They accordingly made the new combinations Ingaderia flexuosa, I. occulta, I. placodioidea and I. sorediata, and introduced the replacement name Ingaderia vandenboomii for Llimonaea sorediata; under this treatment Paraingaderia is no longer maintained as a separate genus.

== Description ==
Ingaderia species form crust-like growths that adhere tightly to the rock or bark, but the margin can develop into small, shrubby projections and in some taxa the entire thallus becomes distinctly bushy (fruticose). The surface is usually a pale cream or chalk-white, though fresh material may show a faint pink flush that weathers to grey-brown with age. Where the lichen grows thickly it often cracks, and many specimens are dusted with powdery reproductive granules called soredia that help the partner organisms disperse together. Under the hand lens the thallus looks matt rather than glossy because it is laden with minute calcium oxalate crystals; these can form a continuous frost beneath or within the outer skin (cortex), though some species lack a cortex entirely. The internal algal partner belongs to the orange-tinged genus Trentepohlia, a common photobiont in tropical crusts.

Sexual fruit bodies are usually abundant and elongated. At first they lie buried in the thallus, but they soon erupt to form narrow slits or lirellae that may remain partially covered by surrounding tissue. Depending on the species the fruit bodies can remain straight, curve sinuously, or branch repeatedly into a tangled network; a light dusting of surface crystals (pruina) is optional. The dark outer wall (exciple) reacts with a drop of potassium hydroxide solution (the K test) by becoming slightly darker or olive-tinged. Inside, the clear hymenium contains eight slender asci whose tips stain blue with iodine, each releasing spindle-shaped ascospores divided by one to several cross-walls; the spores thicken and turn brown over time and are wrapped in a gelatinous sheath that aids dispersal. Tiny, flask-shaped pycnidia immersed in the thallus provide an asexual route: they exude colourless, hair-like conidia that curve gently like a sickle. Secondary chemistry is variable but many species produce the depside compounds erythrin, gyrophoric acid, or lecanoric acid, while a few synthesise psoromic acid.

Ertz and Tehler argued that there are too few stable anatomical differences to justify keeping several small lirellate genera separate around Ingaderia. In their material, all species in the "Llimonaea flexuosa–L. occulta" lineage share a strongly developed dark brown to black excipulum and hypothecium, medium-sized, thick-walled, transversely septate ascospores and slender, curved conidia, whereas thallus growth form, thalline margin and secondary chemistry vary even within single species. They concluded that splitting this clade into several mostly single-species genera would not be morphologically meaningful, and instead adopted a single, phylogenetically defined Ingaderia that brings together crustose, placodioid, subfruticose and fruticose species with broadly similar lirellate ascomata and chemistry.

== Species ==
- Ingaderia dendritica Ertz & Tehler (2023)
- Ingaderia flexuosa (Egea, Torrente & Mies) Ertz & Tehler (2023)
- Ingaderia friabillima Follmann & M.Schulz (1998)
- Ingaderia occulta (Egea & Torrente) Ertz (2023)
- Ingaderia placodioidea (Ertz & Tehler) Ertz & Tehler (2023)
- Ingaderia pulcherrima Darb. (1897)
- Ingaderia sorediata (Sparrius, P.James & M.A. Allen) Ertz (2023)
- Ingaderia vandenboomii Ertz (2023)

The species once named Ingaderia troglodytica Feige & Lumbsch (1993) is synonymous with Paralecanographa grumulosa. The taxon once known as Ingaderia gracillima (Kremp.) Feige & Lumbsch (1993) has since been transferred to the genus Pentagenella as Pentegenella gracillima.
