= Cresponea pallidosorediata =

Scientific classification
- Kingdom: Fungi
- Division: Ascomycota
- Class: Arthoniomycetes
- Order: Arthoniales
- Family: Opegraphaceae
- Genus: Cresponea
- Species: C. pallidosorediata

Binomial name
- Cresponea pallidosorediata Aptroot (2022)

Species of lichen-forming fungus

Cresponea pallidosorediata is a corticolous (bark-dwelling) lichen in the family Opegraphaceae. It is a small crustose lichen that forms pale brownish patches on tree bark in subtropical forests of northern Argentina. It is distinguished by abundant powdery soredia, tiny granules that serve as reproductive propagules, which can spread to cover most of the lichen's surface. It was formally described in 2022 from material collected in Parque provincial Pampa del Indio in Chaco Province, and had not been recorded elsewhere as of the original publication.

== Taxonomy ==
Cresponea pallidosorediata was described in 2022 by André Aptroot from bark-collected material gathered in semi-deciduous subtropical forest at Parque provincial Pampa del Indio (Chaco Province, Argentina), at about 110 m (360 ft) elevation. The holotype (specimen L.I. Ferraro 10815, A. Aptroot & M.E.S. Cáceres) is deposited in the herbarium of the Instituto de Botánica del Nordeste (CTES). Within Cresponea, it is characterized by a pale thallus with abundant soredia produced in tiny, point-like soralia, and by narrowly club-shaped ascospores with 5–7 septa (33–37 × 4.5–5.5 μm). It was compared with the only other sorediate species then known in the genus, C. flavosorediata. That species has much larger, irregular soralia; the thallus features and ascospore characters together support recognition of C. pallidosorediata as distinct.

== Description ==
The thallus is crustose and continuous, forming a dull, pale olivaceous-brown layer up to about 0.1 mm thick. It lacks a cortex and is not bordered by a distinct prothallus It bears abundant soredia that develop in tiny, point-like soralia and soon become granular and widespread, often covering most of the thallus surface. The photobiont is trentepohlioid (a member of the green algal genus Trentepohlia). The ascomata are solitary and sit on the thallus surface, with a constricted base. They are round, 0.7–1.3 mm in diameter and about 0.3 mm high. The disc is black and usually coated with a thin golden-yellow pruina; the black margin is raised above the disc and about 0.2 mm wide. The excipulum and hypothecium are carbonized, and the epihymenium is brownish. The hamathecium is not inspersed and contains anastomosing paraphysoids 1–1.5 μm wide. Ascospores are produced eight per ascus. They are hyaline, narrowly club-shaped, 5–7-septate, and measure 33–37 × 4.5–5.5 μm, without any surrounding gelatinous sheath. Pycnidia (asexual fruiting bodies) have not been observed. In standard spot tests the thallus is UV−, C−, K−, KC− and P−. Thin-layer chromatography has not detected any distinctive secondary metabolites.

== Habitat and distribution ==
Cresponea pallidosorediata grows on tree bark in semi-deciduous subtropical forest in Parque Pampa del Indio (Chaco Province, northern Argentina) at about 110 m (360 ft) elevation. As of its original publication, it had not been reported from outside Argentina. The type locality lies close to the border with Brazil.
