= Cresponea lichenicola =

Scientific classification
- Kingdom: Fungi
- Division: Ascomycota
- Class: Arthoniomycetes
- Order: Arthoniales
- Family: Opegraphaceae
- Genus: Cresponea
- Species: C. lichenicola

Binomial name
- Cresponea lichenicola Aptroot & M.Cáceres (2014)
- Holotype: Parque Natural Municipal de Porto Velho, Brazil

Species of lichen

Cresponea lichenicola is a species of lichenicolous (lichen-dwelling) fungus in the family Arthoniaceae. Described from the Brazilian Amazon in 2014, this species is known from two Brazilian states, where it grows as a parasite on lichens of the genus Pyrenula in primary rainforests. Unlike typical members of its genus that form their own crusty growth on bark, this species lacks an independent body (thallus) and instead develops directly on the surface of its host lichen. It is distinguished by its small, solitary fruiting bodies dusted with bright greenish-yellow pruina and its narrow ascospores divided by 11 to 13 cross-walls—features that help separate it from the related bark-dwelling species C. flavosorediata.

== Taxonomy ==
Cresponea lichenicola was described as new in 2014 by André Aptroot and Marcela Cáceres. The type was collected by the authors from smooth tree bark in primary rainforest at Parque Natural Municipal de Porto Velho, Rondônia (Brazil), at an elevation of about 100 m (330 ft), where it was growing on the thallus of a Pyrenula lichen.

The authors noted that this is the first Cresponea reported without a distinct thallus and with a lichenicolous lifestyle (i.e., living on another lichen rather than directly on bark). They considered it morphologically close to Cresponea flavosorediata, but that species has a typical bark-dwelling thallus with discrete soralia, larger apothecia, and broader ascospores with fewer septa.

== Description ==
No independent thallus was seen; the fungus grows on the surface of a Pyrenula lichen. The apothecia (sexual fruiting bodies) are sessile, rounded and usually solitary, scattered across the host. The discs are flat and densely dusted with vivid greenish-yellow pruina (a fine crystalline "frost"), while the slightly raised margin is black and somewhat glossy. In section, the outer wall (excipulum) is black and roughened; the uppermost layer (epihymenium) is dark brown; and the base (hypothecium) is black. The hymenium (spore-bearing layer) is hyaline and stains blue with iodine (IKI+). Paraphysoids are branched with brown tips covered by a thick pruinose layer. Asci are club-shaped (clavate) and contain eight irregularly arranged ascospores. The ascospores are hyaline, narrowly clavate, with 11–13 cross-walls (septa), about 30–45 × 4.5–5.5 μm, often slightly curved with rounded ends. No pycnidia (asexual fruiting bodies) were observed. In spot tests, apothecia are UV−, C− and P−; the thallus (host surface) is K−, while the epihymenium reacts K+ (red), indicating an anthraquinone pigment.

== Habitat and distribution ==
Cresponea lichenicola is lichenicolous on the thallus of Pyrenula growing on smooth bark in primary lowland rainforest. Originally described from specimens collected in Rondônia, it has since been recorded in Sergipe.
