= Dictyographa =

Scientific classification
- Domain: Eukaryota
- Kingdom: Fungi
- Division: Ascomycota
- Class: Arthoniomycetes
- Order: Arthoniales
- Family: Opegraphaceae
- Genus: Dictyographa; Müll.Arg. (1893)

Type species
- Dictyographa arabica Müll.Arg. (1893)

Species
- D. arabica D. cinerea D. varians

Genus of lichens

Dictyographa is a genus of lichen-forming fungi in the family Opegraphaceae. It comprises three species of corticolous (bark-dwelling), crustose lichens. The genus was originally described by the Swiss scientist Johannes Müller Argoviensis in 1893, who distinguished it from related genera by its unique spore structure and interconnected filaments within its reproductive organs. Dictyographa lichens are characterised by their elongated, slit-like fruiting bodies and spores that are divided by both vertical and horizontal internal walls. The genus has been subject to taxonomic debate, with some researchers proposing to merge it with the related genus Opegrapha. However, genetic studies have since confirmed Dictyographa as a distinct evolutionary lineage. These lichens are found in various parts of the world, including Africa, the Middle East, and Hawaii, typically growing in coastal environments.

== Taxonomy ==
The genus Dictyographa was circumscribed by the Swiss lichenologist Johannes Müller Argoviensis in the late 19th century. In his description, Müller noted that the genus is characterised by a crustose (crust-like) thallus with chroolepoid gonidia, a type of green algae commonly found in lichen symbioses. The reproductive structures, or apothecia, are lirelliform, meaning they are elongated and slit-like, and gymnocarpous, which means they remain open at maturity. Within the apothecia, the paraphyses—non-reproductive filaments—are irregular in shape and interconnected in a lattice-like manner. Müller further described the spores of Dictyographa as hyaline (transparent) and initially divided transversely before becoming parenchymatous, a tissue-like structure, as they mature.

Müller emphasized the distinction between Dictyographa and related genera. He highlighted that, while it is similar to the genus Opegrapha, which also has transversely divided spores, Dictyographa can be differentiated by its parenchymatous spore structure. Furthermore, it differs from Graphina in both its spore development and the way the paraphyses are intricately connected. Müller also included the species Dictyographa varians, previously classified as Graphina varians, in the new genus.

The type species of the genus, Dictyographa arabica, was described by Müller as having a thin, white thallus and lirellae (elongated fruiting bodies) that are linear to spindle-shaped and variably curved. The perithecium, the layer surrounding the reproductive structures, is black, while the spores are spindle-shaped, multi-septate (divided into several compartments), and measure 30–33 μm in length. Müller distinguished D. arabica from related species by its prominently emerging but not fully exposed lirellae, which remain narrowly closed even at maturity.

In 2007, Damien Ertz and Paul Diederich proposed synonymising Dictyographa with Opegrapha because they found that species of Dictyographa are similar to Opegrapha in all key characteristics except for having muriform (divided by both transverse and longitudinal septa) ascospores rather than only transversely septate ascospores. Specifically, they noted that Dictyographa species share with Opegrapha: lirelliform ascomata with a carbonised (blackened) excipulum, anastomosing paraphysoids, K/I+ blue hymenial gel, clavate asci with an apical K/I+ blue ring, and I- ascospores. The authors argued that the single character of muriform vs transversely septate ascospores alone does not justify maintaining Dictyographa as a separate genus. They noted this is similar to other recently revised lichen genera like Arthonia, Graphis, and Strigula which now include species with both muriform and transversely septate ascospores. However, in 2011, Ertz and Anders Tehler reversed this decision, as molecular phylogenetics results showed that Dictyographa formed a well-sported evolution distinct from Opegrapha.

In 1897, Otto Vernon Darbishire proposed the genus name Dictyographa, unaware of Müller's use of the name a few years before. Consequently, Dictyographa Darb. (1897) is an illegitimate name, and it is now considered synonymous with the genus Pentagenella.

== Description ==
Dictyographa is characterised by a crustose thallus that can vary in colour, typically ranging from white to pale grey or olivaceous. The thallus is generally thin and can be continuous, rimose (with cracks), or areolate. The surface texture may range from smooth to slightly rough, and can be matt to slightly shiny, sometimes with a pruinose coating.

The ascomata (fruiting bodies) are typically numerous and scattered across the thallus. They are lirelliform (elongated and slit-like) in shape, and can be straight, curved, or flexuous. The ascomata may be simple or branched, and their size can vary among species. They are usually initially immersed in the thallus but become more exposed as they mature. The excipulum (the outer layer of the ascomata) is typically dark, often black. The hymenium (the fertile layer of the ascomata) is hyaline. The paraphysoids (sterile filaments in the hymenium) are branched and anastomosing. The asci are club-shaped (clavate) and typically contain multiple spores. They possess a distinct apical ring that stains blue with Lugol's iodine after KOH pretreatment (K/I+ blue).

A key characteristic of Dictyographa is its ascospores, which are hyaline and submuriform (divided by both transverse and longitudinal septa). They are generally oblong in shape, with multiple transverse septa and one or more longitudinal septa in some cells. Pycnidia (asexual reproductive structures) may be present in some species, typically found near the margin of the thallus. When present, the conidia (asexual spores) are hyaline and aseptate.

The chemistry of Dictyographa species can vary, but they generally do not show strong reactions to common lichen spot tests. Some species may fluoresce under ultraviolet light.

This genus is distinguished from the closely related Opegrapha primarily by its submuriform ascospores, compared to the transversely septate ascospores of Opegrapha.

== Habitat and distribution ==
The genus Dictyographa has a widespread but scattered distribution, with species found in various tropical and subtropical regions. These lichens predominantly inhabit coastal areas, showing a particular affinity for environments influenced by marine conditions. Dictyographa arabica has the widest known distribution. It has been recorded from coastal regions in several countries across multiple continents. In Africa, it has been found in Angola, Kenya, and Tanzania. The species also occurs on islands in the Indian Ocean, including the Seychelles (both on Mahé and Aldabra). Its range extends to the Arabian Peninsula, with records from Yemen. In the Asia-Pacific region, D. arabica has been documented in Papua New Guinea and Australia. The easternmost known occurrence of the species is in Hawaii.

D. arabica shows a strong preference for coastal vegetation, particularly mangrove ecosystems. It has been observed growing on a variety of tree species in these habitats, including Adansonia, Avicennia marina, Commiphora, Rhizophora, and Xylocarpus granatum. In the Seychelles, it has been found on additional host trees such as coconut, Pandanus tectorius, and Sideroxylon inerme. In Australia, it has been recorded on Casuarina equisetifolia.

Another species in the genus, D. varians, appears to have a more restricted distribution. Current records indicate its presence in mainland Yemen and on the island of Socotra. Unlike D. arabica, D. varians has been found in non-coastal environments, with specimens collected from elevations of up to 700 metres above sea level. It has been observed growing on twigs of Boscia arabica and Dracaena species.

== Species ==
- Dictyographa arabica Müll.Arg. (1893)
- Dictyographa cinerea Müll.Arg. (1894)
- Dictyographa varians (Müll.Arg.) Müll.Arg. (1893)

A few other taxa previously classified in Dictyographa have since been reduced to synonymy with other species, or transferred to other genera:

- Dictyographa angolensis (Vain.) Zahlbr. (1923) – synonym of O. arabica
- Dictyographa contortuplicata Müll.Arg. (1894) – a little-known species with a type specimen of uncertain provenance, and probably a member of the Graphidaceae
- Dictyographa epiphylla Zahlbr. (1928) – now known as Aulaxina epiphylla
- Dictyographa gracillima (Kremp.) Darb. (1897) – now known as Pentagenella gracillima
- Dictyographa psyllocarpa (Leight.) Redinger (1940) – a taxon that "seems to be non-lichenized and might belong to the Hysteriaceae"
- Dictyographa sandwicensis Zahlbr. (1944) – synonym of O. arabica
