= Cresponea ancistrosporelloides =

Scientific classification
- Kingdom: Fungi
- Division: Ascomycota
- Class: Arthoniomycetes
- Order: Arthoniales
- Family: Opegraphaceae
- Genus: Cresponea
- Species: C. ancistrosporelloides

Binomial name
- Cresponea ancistrosporelloides Sparrius & Sipman (2011)

Species of lichen

Cresponea ancistrosporelloides is a species of lichen in the family Opegraphaceae. Known only from Stirling Range National Park in Western Australia, it was described as new to science in 2011. The specific epithet ancistrosporelloides refers to the similarity of its tailed spores to those of genus Ancistrosporella. The lichen forms pale grey crusts on volcanic rock and produces small black reproductive discs. It grows in dry shrubland at about 740 metres elevation and is one of only seven species in its genus found in Australia.

== Taxonomy ==
Cresponea ancistrosporelloides was formally described by Laurens Sparrius and Harrie Sipman from a single specimen collected in 1994 on the upper slopes of Toolbrunup peak in Western Australia's Stirling Range National Park. Although its tailed, many-celled spores recall those of the genus Ancistrosporella, the species lacks the lirellate fruiting bodies typical of that group. Instead it has small, rounded apothecia and an iodine-positive hymenium, characters that accord better with the crustose, largely tropical genus Cresponea. Because its spores also lack the thick walls and swollen septum edges considered diagnostic for Cresponea, the authors placed the taxon there only provisionally, pending broader phylogenetic work. Within the genus it is distinguished by its unusually long, spirally coiled basal spore appendage—an attribute unmatched in any other named species.

== Description ==
The lichen forms a pale grey, thin crust that can exceed ten centimetres across. The thallus is neatly cracked into irregular areoles 0.1–0.6 mm wide, separated by hair-line fissures. A cortex of tightly interwoven fungal filaments (hyphae), up to 30 μm thick, overlies a white medulla containing loose hyphae and orange-brown cells of Trentepohlia-type photobiont.

Black, slightly glossy apothecia are abundant. They are flat-topped, 0.3–0.6 mm in diameter, and have a narrow rim that does not rise above the disc. In section the exciple is dark brown and densely cemented, the hymenium is 60–65 μm tall and stains reddish with iodine, and the epithecium forms a granular, dark-brown cap about 20 μm deep. Each flask-shaped ascus contains eight spindle-shaped (fusiform) ascospores divided by seven transverse walls (septa); the spores measure 35–50 × 5 μm and taper into a 20 μm-long tail that coils beneath the main body while still inside the ascus. No pycnidia or lichen products have been detected; standard spot tests on the thallus are negative.

== Habitat and distribution ==
The species is known solely from the type collection made at about 740 m elevation on the southern flank of the Stirling Range. It grows on volcanic rock within a dry sclerophyll community that is punctuated by denser shrub pockets. Cresponea ancistrosporelloides is one of seven Cresponea species known to occur in Australia, and one of the few saxicolous (rock-dwelling) members of the genus.
