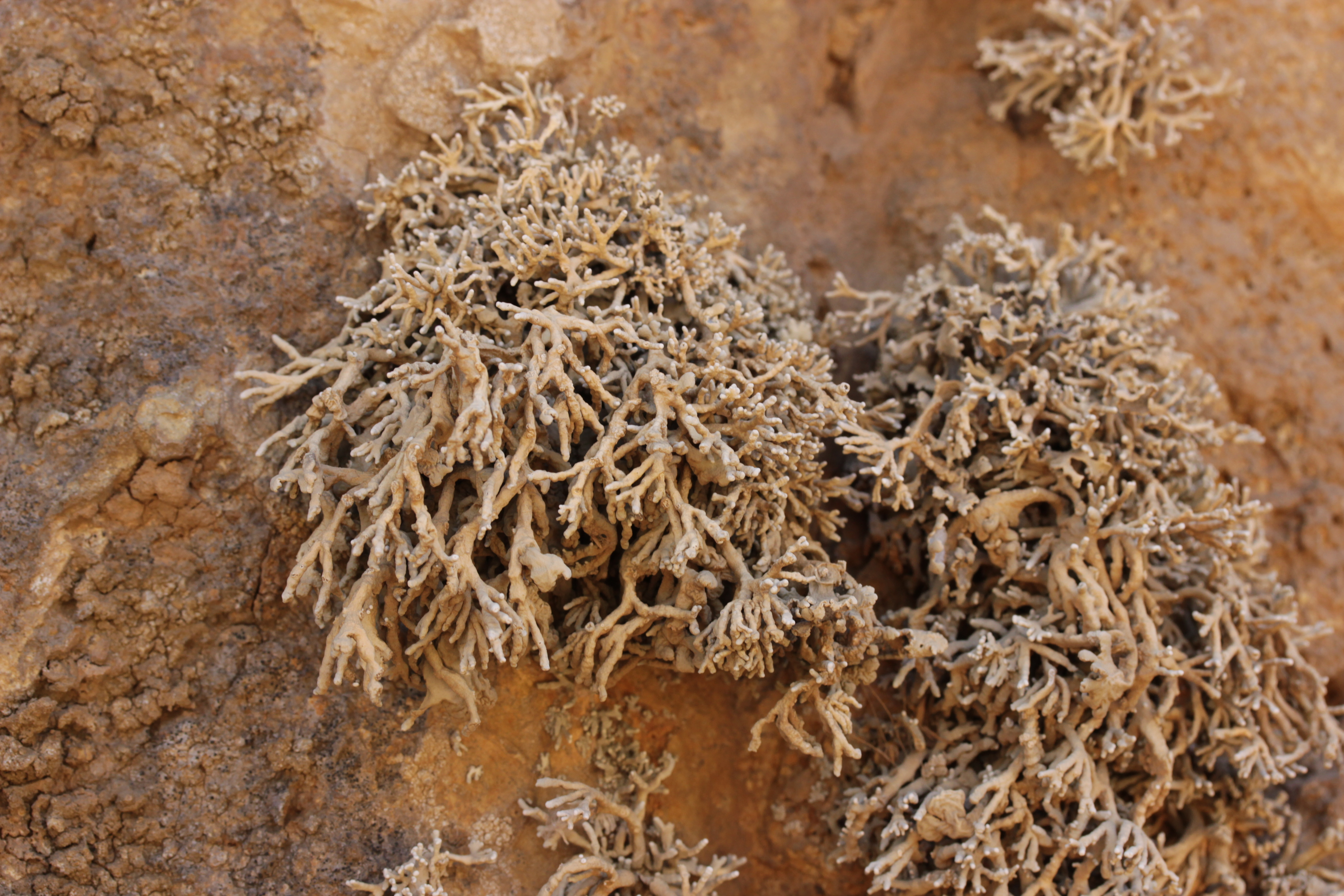
- Schizopelte californica

Scientific classification
- Domain: Eukaryota
- Kingdom: Fungi
- Division: Ascomycota
- Class: Arthoniomycetes
- Order: Arthoniales
- Family: Opegraphaceae
- Genus: Schizopelte; Th.Fr. (1875)

Type species
- Schizopelte californica Th.Fr. (1875)

Species
- S. lumbricoides S. parishii S. californica S. crustosa

Synonyms
- Schizopeltomyces Cif. & Tomas. (1953)

= Schizopelte =

Genus of lichens

Schizopelte is a genus of lichen-forming fungi in the family Opegraphaceae. The genus was circumscribed by Theodor Magnus Fries in 1875. It was resurrected for use in 2011 by Damien Ertz and Anders Tehler, who published a phylogenetic study of the order Arthoniales. In addition to the type species, S. californica, they included a former Hubbsia species, a former Llimonaea species, and a species new to science in the resurrected Schizopelte.

== Species ==
- Schizopelte lumbricoides (W.A.Weber) Ertz & Tehler 2011
- Schizopelte parishii (Hasse) Ertz & Tehler 2011
- Schizopelte californica Th.Fr. (1875)
- Schizopelte crustosa Ertz & Tehler (2011)

All four Schizopelte species are endemic to the north-western American coast.
