= S. californica =

S. californica may refer to:

- Schizopelte californica, a lichenized fungus species
- Scrophularia californica, the California figwort and California bee plant, a flowering plant species native to the western United States and British Columbia
- Scutellaria californica, the California skullcap, a plant species endemic to California
- Smilax californica, the California greenbriar, a common woody vine species native to the Western United States
- Sorbus californica, an aggregate tree species native to western North America
- Squatina californica, The Pacific angelshark, a fish species found in the eastern Pacific Ocean from Alaska to the Gulf of California and from Ecuador to Chile
- Stagmomantis californica, the California mantis, a praying mantis species native to the Western United States

== See also ==
- List of Latin and Greek words commonly used in systematic names#C
