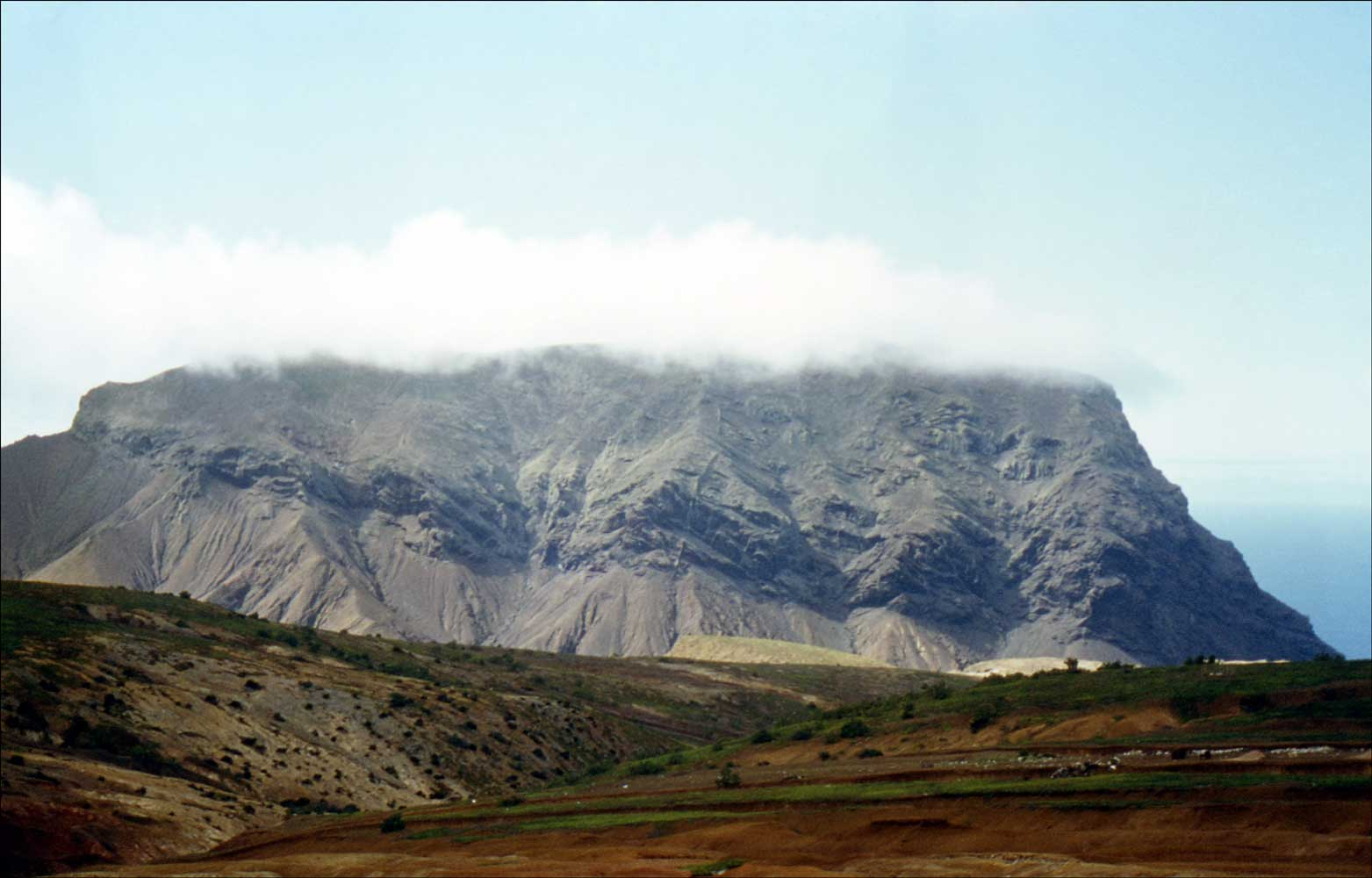
- "The Barn" is the type locality of Dolichocarpus seawardii.

Scientific classification
- Domain: Eukaryota
- Kingdom: Fungi
- Division: Ascomycota
- Class: Arthoniomycetes
- Order: Arthoniales
- Family: Opegraphaceae
- Genus: Dolichocarpus
- Species: D. seawardii

Binomial name
- Dolichocarpus seawardii Aptroot (2008)

= Dolichocarpus seawardii =

Species of lichen

Dolichocarpus seawardii is a species of saxicolous (rock-dwelling), fruticose lichen in the family Opegraphaceae. It is found in the remote tropical island of Saint Helena, where it forms large patches on wet, overhanging rock ledges. It was formally described as a new species in 2008 by Dutch lichenologist André Aptroot. The type specimen was collected by the author on The Barn along God's Path at an elevation of 475 m (1,558 ft); there, it was found growing on basalt. The irregularly branched, fruticose thallus of the lichen measures up to 8 mm (0.3 in). Thin-layer chromatography shows that the species contains erythrin; tiny translucent crystals of this lichen product encrust the hyphae of the medulla. The photobiont partner, dispersed throughout the medulla, is an orange-coloured member of genus Trentepohlia, with cell diameters of about 10 μm. The species epithet honours lichenologist colleague Mark Seaward, who encouraged the author to conduct the lichen survey at this location. Dolichocarpus seawardii is only known to occur on Saint Helena, where it forms large patches on The Barn, and below Little Stone Top.
