= Sclerophyton perithecioideum =

Scientific classification
- Kingdom: Fungi
- Division: Ascomycota
- Class: Arthoniomycetes
- Order: Arthoniales
- Family: Opegraphaceae
- Genus: Sclerophyton
- Species: S. perithecioideum

Binomial name
- Sclerophyton perithecioideum Aptroot (2022)

Species of lichen-forming fungus

Sclerophyton perithecioideum is a corticolous (bark-dwelling) lichen in the family Opegraphaceae. It is a small crustose lichen that forms pale grayish-white crusts on tree bark in lowland primary (old-growth) rainforest in the Brazilian Amazon. The species is distinguished by clusters of small, dark fruiting structures set within raised, pale, pustule-like mounds on the thallus, and by the presence of psoromic acid (a lichen substance). It was formally described in 2022 from material collected near Manaus in Amazonas State, and it remains known only from two low-elevation localities in northern Brazil.

== Taxonomy ==
Sclerophyton perithecioideum was described in 2022 by André Aptroot from material collected on tree bark in primary rain forest in the Adolfo Ducke Forest Reserve near Manaus, Amazonas, Brazil, at about 50 m (160 ft) elevation. The holotype (M.E.S. Cáceres 50801 & A. Aptroot) is deposited in the herbarium of the National Institute of Amazonian Research (INPA 284722), with isotypes (duplicate specimens) in the herbaria ABL and the Instituto de Botânica (ISE). The species is a bark-dwelling Sclerophyton with a thallus containing psoromic acid. It has pinpoint-like, perithecioid ascomata in groups of 15–35 within pseudostromata (raised tissue mounds), and ascospores that are typically 3-septate (with three cross-walls), club-shaped, and enlarged at the tip (macrocephalic), 28–31 μm long. In a global identification key to Sclerophyton (Sparrius, 2004), it runs to the couplet defined by a dull thallus, somewhat glossy pseudostromata, and ascospores about 28–31 μm long. This combination distinguishes S. perithecioideum from other species in the genus.

== Description ==
The thallus of Sclerophyton perithecioideum is crustose (crust-like), continuous, and dull. It forms a pale grayish-white crust up to about 8 cm (3.1 in) across and about 0.1 mm thick, lacks a cortex (a distinct outer layer), and is not bordered by a distinct prothallus. The photobiont (algal partner) is trentepohlioid (Trentepohlia-type). The ascomata are punctiform (pinpoint-like) and apparently perithecioid. They are immersed in groups of 15–35 within well-developed pseudostromata. Individual ascomata are 0.1–0.15 mm wide and show a black disc. The pseudostromata are almost white and lobate, raised above the thallus but not constricted at the base. They measure 0.6–1.9 mm in diameter and up to 0.3 mm high. The epihymenium (upper layer of the spore-bearing tissue) is pale brown. The hamathecium (sterile filaments among the asci) is not inspersed, and it stains deep blue in the iodine test (IKI+). Ascospores are produced eight per ascus. They are hyaline (colorless), usually 3-septate (occasionally 4-septate), club-shaped (clavate), and enlarged at the tip (macrocephalic). They measure 28–31 × 7.5–8.5 μm and are not surrounded by a gelatinous sheath. Pycnidia have not been observed. All standard spot tests are negative (UV−, C−, K− and KC−) except P, which turns yellow (P+). Thin-layer chromatography detected psoromic acid as the main lichen substance.

== Habitat and distribution ==
It was described from the Adolfo Ducke Forest Reserve near Manaus in Amazonas. Additional material has been recorded from primary rainforest at Vila Nazare, north of Dom Eliseu in Pará, at about 120 m (390 ft) elevation. These records indicate an altitudinal range of roughly 50 to 120 m (160 to 390 ft). When it was described in 2022, it had not been reported from outside Brazil. No further occurrences had been reported by 2025.
