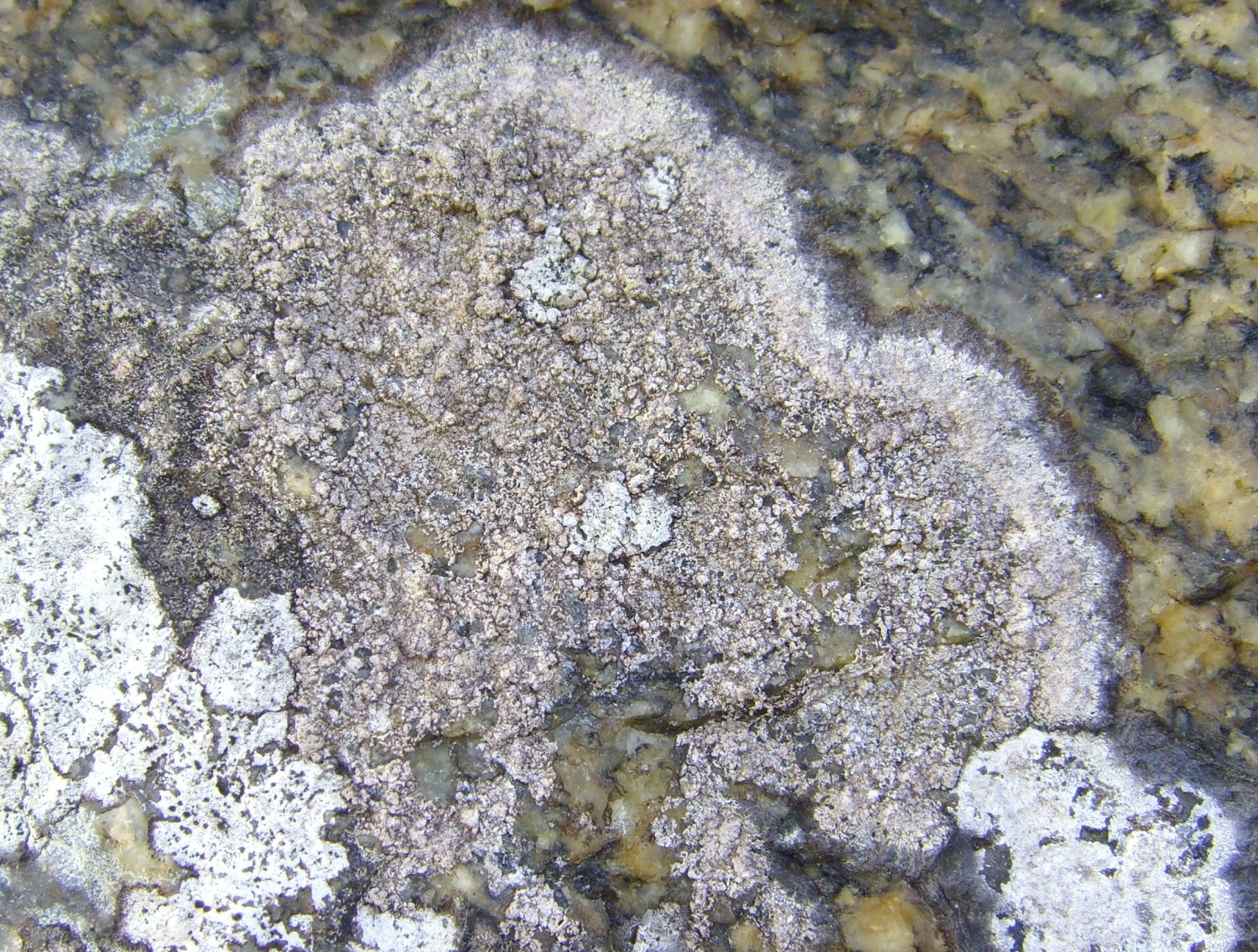
- Llimonaea sorediata

Scientific classification
- Kingdom: Fungi
- Division: Ascomycota
- Class: Arthoniomycetes
- Order: Arthoniales
- Family: Opegraphaceae
- Genus: Llimonaea; Egea & Torrente (1991)

Type species
- Llimonaea occulta Egea & Torrente (1991)

Species
- L. californica L. flexuosa L. occulta L. sorediata

= Llimonaea =

Genus of lichen-forming fungi

Llimonaea is a genus of lichen-forming fungi in the order Arthoniales. The genus has been placed into the family Opegraphaceae. These lichens form thin, firmly attached crusts that vary from chalky white and grey to olive-green or dark brown, often edged by a neat black line and characterized by rounded or scribble-like reproductive structures that sit flush with the surface. Established as a genus in 1991, Llimonaea species are distinguished by their partnership with orange-tinged green algae, their spindle-shaped spores with multiple cross-walls that gradually turn brown with age, and their black-rimmed crusts with robust carbonized walls around the fruiting bodies.

== Taxonomy ==
Genus Llimonaea was circumscribed by the mycologists José María Egea Fernández and Pilar Torrente in 1991. They assigned L. occulta as the type, and at the time, only species of the genus.

== Description ==
Llimonaea lichens form a thin, firmly attached crust (crustose thallus) whose surface can appear smooth or cracked and may be partially embedded in the bark or rock it colonises. The crust is built from a tangled cortex of colourless fungal threads (hyphae) and is commonly edged by a neat black line, the prothallus, that demarcates each colony. Depending on moisture and light the thallus varies from chalky white and dove grey to olive-green or dark brown, and some species produce discrete powdery patches (soralia) that release bundles of algal and fungal cells for vegetative spread. The photosynthetic partner is the orange-tinged green alga Trentepohlia, although a few species live parasitically on other lichens that house different algae.

Reproduction is dominated by rounded or scribble-like (lirelliform) apothecia that sit flush with the surface and are ringed by a low rim of thallus tissue (thalline margin). Beneath this margin lies a robust black wall of carbonised hyphae—the true exciple—which encloses a forest of branched, interwoven filaments (paraphysoids) forming the hamathecium. Each club-shaped ascus contains eight ascospores and opens by splitting between its two walls (fissitunicate dehiscence). When stained with iodine after a mild alkaline wash, the ascus apex shows a faint blue halo around the tiny "window" (ocular chamber) through which the spores escape.

The spindle-shaped spores are partitioned by several thick cross-walls—up to fourteen in some species—and gradually turn cinnamon brown with age; they often show a slight constriction at the first septum. Some Llimonaea species also form minute black pycnidia that ooze long, curved, colourless conidia, providing an asexual route for dispersal. Unlike many of their roccellaceous relatives, these lichens generally lack conspicuous secondary metabolites; the few compounds detected fall into the orcinol and β-orcinol depside families, with erythrin and isoerythrin recorded sporadically. Collectively, the combination of a black-rimmed crust, lirelliform apothecia with a carbonised exciple, branched paraphysoids and multi-septate, late-browning spores provides a practical field diagnosis for the genus.

== Species ==
As of June 2025, Species Fungorum (in the Catalogue of Life) accepts four species of Llimonaea:

- Llimonaea californica (Tuck.) Sparrius (2004)
- Llimonaea flexuosa Egea, Torrente & Mies (1995)
- Llimonaea occulta Egea & Torrente (1991)
- Llimonaea sorediata van den Boom, M.Brand & Elix (2007)

The taxon Llimonaea cerebriformis (Egea & Torrente) Sparrius (2004) has since been transferred to the genus Sparria as Sparria cerebriformis.
