= Arthonia darbishirei =

Scientific classification
- Domain: Eukaryota
- Kingdom: Fungi
- Division: Ascomycota
- Class: Arthoniomycetes
- Order: Arthoniales
- Family: Arthoniaceae
- Genus: Arthonia
- Species: A. darbishirei

Binomial name
- Arthonia darbishirei Follmann & B.Werner (2003)

Species of lichen

Arthonia darbishirei is a species of lichenicolous (lichen-dwelling) fungus in the family Arthoniaceae. Found on the Galápagos Islands, it was described as new to science in 2003 by Gerhard Follman and Birgit Werner. It was first collected on San Salvador Island in June 1872 during the Hassler Expedition. The fungus grows specifically on the thallus of Roccella nigerrima, a fruticose lichen that is endemic to the Galápagos. The species epithet darbishirei honours the British lichenologist Otto Vernon Darbishire (1870–1934), who initially described the host lichen and made significant contributions to the study of roccellaceous lichens.

Arthonia darbishirei is characterised by its reddish rusty, irregularly maculiform to indefinite ascomata (fruiting bodies) that grow on the sides of the branches of R. nigerrima. The ascomata measure 0.5–1.3 mm in diameter and have a hyaline (translucent) hypothecium and hemiamyloid hymenium. The fungus produces pear-shaped asci containing eight hyaline, broadly fusiform, four-celled ascospores with a distinctive microcephalic shape. While A. darbishirei infiltrates the algal layer of its host, it appears to be parasymbiotic, causing no visible damage to R. nigerrima. The species is known only from its type locality on San Salvador Island, where it inhabits geologically young lava rocks in the salty and moist environments typical of Galápagos Roccella species.
