= Sclerophyton =

Scientific classification
- Domain: Eukaryota
- Kingdom: Fungi
- Division: Ascomycota
- Class: Arthoniomycetes
- Order: Arthoniales
- Family: Opegraphaceae
- Genus: Sclerophyton; Eschw. (1824)

Type species
- Sclerophyton elegans Eschw. (1824)

Species
- See text

Genus of lichen

Sclerophyton is a genus of lichen-forming fungi in the family Opegraphaceae. It has about 15 species. The genus was circumscribed by German lichenologist Franz Gerhard Eschweiler in 1824, with Sclerophyton elegans assigned as the type species.

== Species ==
- Sclerophyton aptrootii Sparrius (2004)
- Sclerophyton conspicuum A.W.Archer (2003)
- Sclerophyton elegans Eschw. (1824)
- Sclerophyton extenuatum (Nyl.) Sparrius (2004)
- Sclerophyton fluorescens Sparrius (2004)
- Sclerophyton hillii A.W.Archer (2003)
- Sclerophyton indicum Makhija & Adaw. (2002)
- Sclerophyton insularum A.W.Archer (2003)
- Sclerophyton madagascariense Sparrius (2004)
- Sclerophyton perithecioideum Aptroot (2022) – Brazil
- Sclerophyton puncticulatum P.M.McCarthy & Elix (2018)
- Sclerophyton seriale (Ach.) Sparrius (2004)
- Sclerophyton stigmaticum (Kremp.) Sparrius (2004)
- Sclerophyton syncesioides Sparrius (2004)
- Sclerophyton trinidadense Sparrius (2004)
- Sclerophyton vertex Sparrius (2004)
