= Fouragea =

Scientific classification
- Domain: Eukaryota
- Kingdom: Fungi
- Division: Ascomycota
- Class: Arthoniomycetes
- Order: Arthoniales
- Family: Opegraphaceae
- Genus: Fouragea; Trevis. (1880)

Type species
- Fouragea filicina (Mont.) Trevis. (1880)

Genus of lichens

Fouragea is a genus of lichen-forming fungi in the family Opegraphaceae. It has nine species.

== Taxonomy ==
The genus was originally circumscribed by Italian botanist Vittore Benedetto Antonio Trevisan de Saint-Léon in 1880, for the species Opegrapha filicina, first described by Camille Montagne. Several features distinguished this lichen from the usual, bark-dwelling Opegrapha species: its slender ascocarps, which are a result of its foliicolous lifestyle, the absence of a dark excipulum at the base, and the preference for Phycopeltis as a photobiont instead of Trentepohlia.

The genus was reinstated in 2014 to contain foliicolous (leaf-dwelling) Opegrapha species, following a molecular phylogenetics-led reorganisation of the order Arthoniales. Prior molecular work had already demonstrated that the foliicolous species, O. filicina and O. viridistellata, formed an independent lineage at the base of the Opegraphaceae.

== Species ==
- Fouragea alba (Lücking) Ertz (2020)
- Fouragea filicina (Mont.) Trevis. (1880)
- Fouragea gyrophorica – China
- Fouragea heliabravoa (Herrera-Camp. & Lücking) Ertz (2020)
- Fouragea phyllobia (Nyl.) Zahlbr. (1923)
- Fouragea puiggarii (Müll.Arg.) Zahlbr. (1923)
- Fouragea tuxtlensis (Herrera-Camp. & Lücking) Ertz (2020)
- Fouragea vegae (R.Sant.) Ertz (2020)
- Fouragea viridistellata (Sérus., Lücking & Sparrius) Ertz & Frisch (2014)
