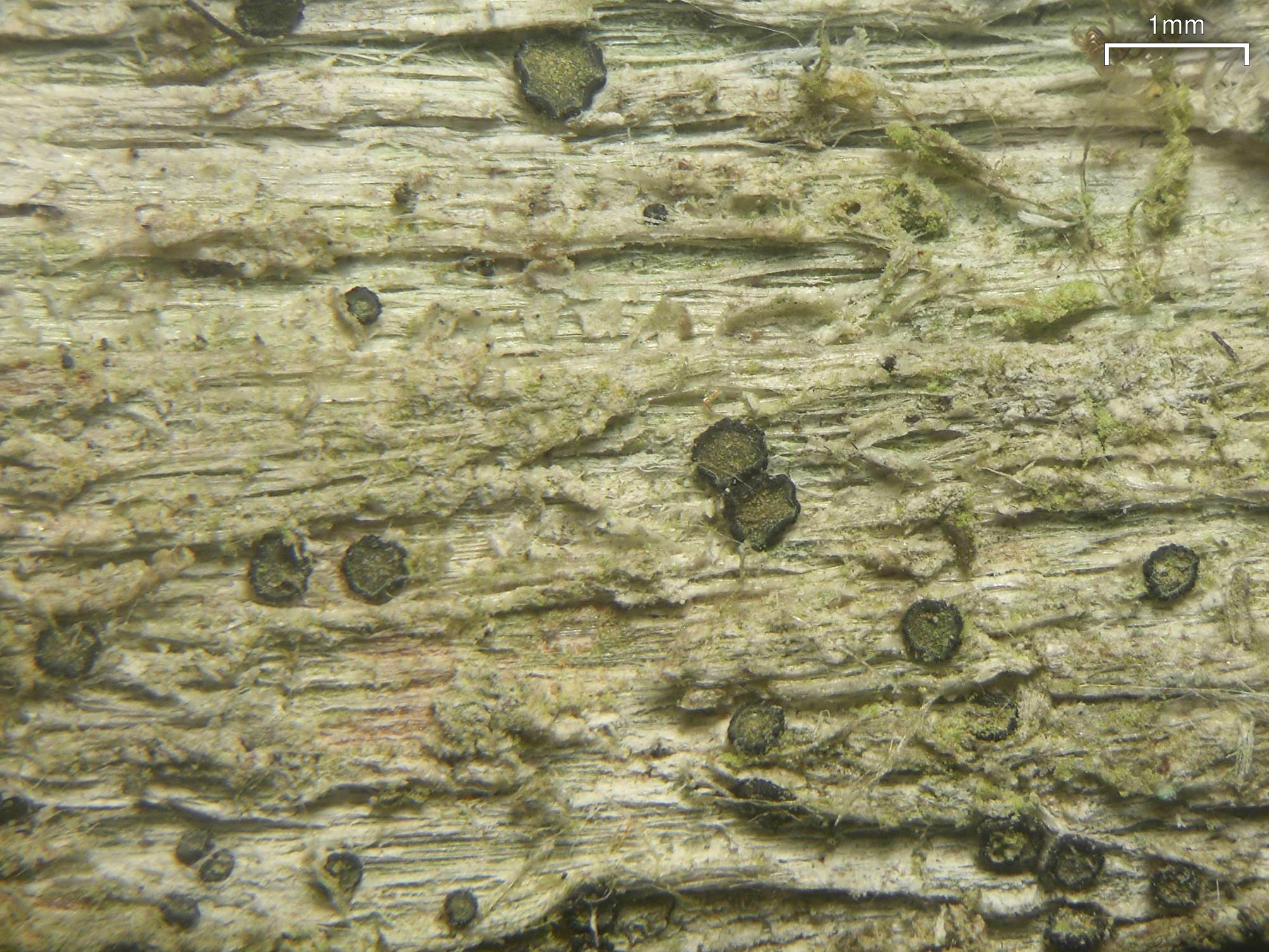
- Cresponea chloroconia

Scientific classification
- Kingdom: Fungi
- Division: Ascomycota
- Class: Arthoniomycetes
- Order: Arthoniales
- Family: Opegraphaceae
- Genus: Cresponea; Egea & Torrente (1993)

Type species
- Cresponea premnea (Ach.) Egea & Torrente (1993)

= Cresponea =

Genus of lichens

Cresponea is a genus of lichens in the family Opegraphaceae. The genus, circumscribed in 1993, contains species that were formerly classified in Lecanactis. Cresponea is widely distributed, but most species are found in tropical and subtropical regions. The genus is named in honor of the Spanish lichenologist Ana Crespo.

== Description ==
Cresponea spreads as a thin, paint-like crust that merges with the surface of bark or, less often, rock. The thallus can be smooth or cracked into an irregular mosaic, and on rare occasions it breaks into tiny, discrete areoles. Colours range from chalk-white through pale grey to a muted green; some specimens show a narrow, dark brown margin where the fungal threads alone grow out beyond the algal layer. Because there is no separate cortex, the fungal tissue lies directly over the photobiont, usually the filamentous green alga genus Trentepohlia, which gives a faint orange tint when the surface is scratched. The lichen never produces isidia or soralia, so it relies on its sexual and asexual fruit bodies for dispersal.

The sexual structures are small, button-like apothecia that sit on the thallus with a pinched base. They lack a rim of thallus tissue, instead showing a glossy, often crenulated rim (the exciple) that is conspicuously dark brown to black and remains free of the powdery bloom that coats many related genera. The disc starts flat, may become gently domed, and is dusted with a fine white or bluish pruina, especially in young apothecia. Inside, the clear hymenium stains blue or reddish in iodine and houses slender paraphysoid filaments whose club-shaped tips carry a dark brown cap; together these caps form a granular epithecium that turns yellow in potassium hydroxide solution. Each ascus releases eight long, spindle-shaped ascospores divided by three to nineteen cross-walls (septa); the walls are thick, and the spores stay colourless. Asexual reproduction occurs in tiny pycnidia embedded in the crust; these produce short, rod-shaped conidia. Most species show no detectable lichen products in chemical tests.

== Ecology ==
Generally epiphytic, Cresponea lichen prefer mature, humid woodlands and are sometimes used as an indicator of old-growth conditions, though a few species tolerate rock surfaces in sheltered sites.

== Species ==
As of September 2025, Species Fungorum (in the Catalogue of Life) accepts 23 species of Cresponea.

- Cresponea ancistrosporelloides Sparrius & Sipman (2011)
- Cresponea apiculata Egea, Sérus. & Torrente (1996)
- Cresponea chloroconia (Tuck.) Egea & Torrente (1993)
- Cresponea endosulphurea M.Cáceres, A.A.Menezes & Aptroot (2013) – Brazil
- Cresponea flava (Vain.) Egea & Torrente (1993)
- Cresponea flavescens (Vain.) Egea & Torrente (1993)
- Cresponea flavosorediata Aptroot & M.Cáceres (2014) – Brazil
- Cresponea follmannii (C.W.Dodge) Egea & Torrente (1993)
- Cresponea graemeannae Kantvilas (2020)
- Cresponea japonica A.Sakata & H.Harada (2009)
- Cresponea leprieurii (Mont.) Egea & Torrente (1993)
- Cresponea leprieuroides (Nyl.) Egea & Torrente (1993)
- Cresponea lichenicola Aptroot & M.Cáceres (2014) – Brazil
- Cresponea macrocarpoides (Zahlbr.) Egea & Torrente (1993)
- Cresponea melanocheiloides (Vain.) Egea & Torrente (1993)
- Cresponea pallidosorediata Aptroot (2022) – Brazil
- Cresponea plurilocularis (Nyl.) Egea & Torrente (1993)
- Cresponea premnea (Ach.) Egea & Torrente (1993)
- Cresponea proximata (Nyl.) Egea & Torrente (1993)
- Cresponea quinqueseptata Aptroot & M.Cáceres (2021) – Brazil
- Cresponea sorediata Elix, Øvstedal & N.J.M.Gremmen (2011)
- Cresponea subpremnea (Kantvilas & Vězda) Kantvilas (2020)

The taxon once known as Cresponea litoralis Elix (2007) is no longer placed in Cresponea because the species has asci of the Bactrospora-type, a very lax hymenium, and filiform, multiseptate ascospores, which are features diagnostic of Bactrospora.
