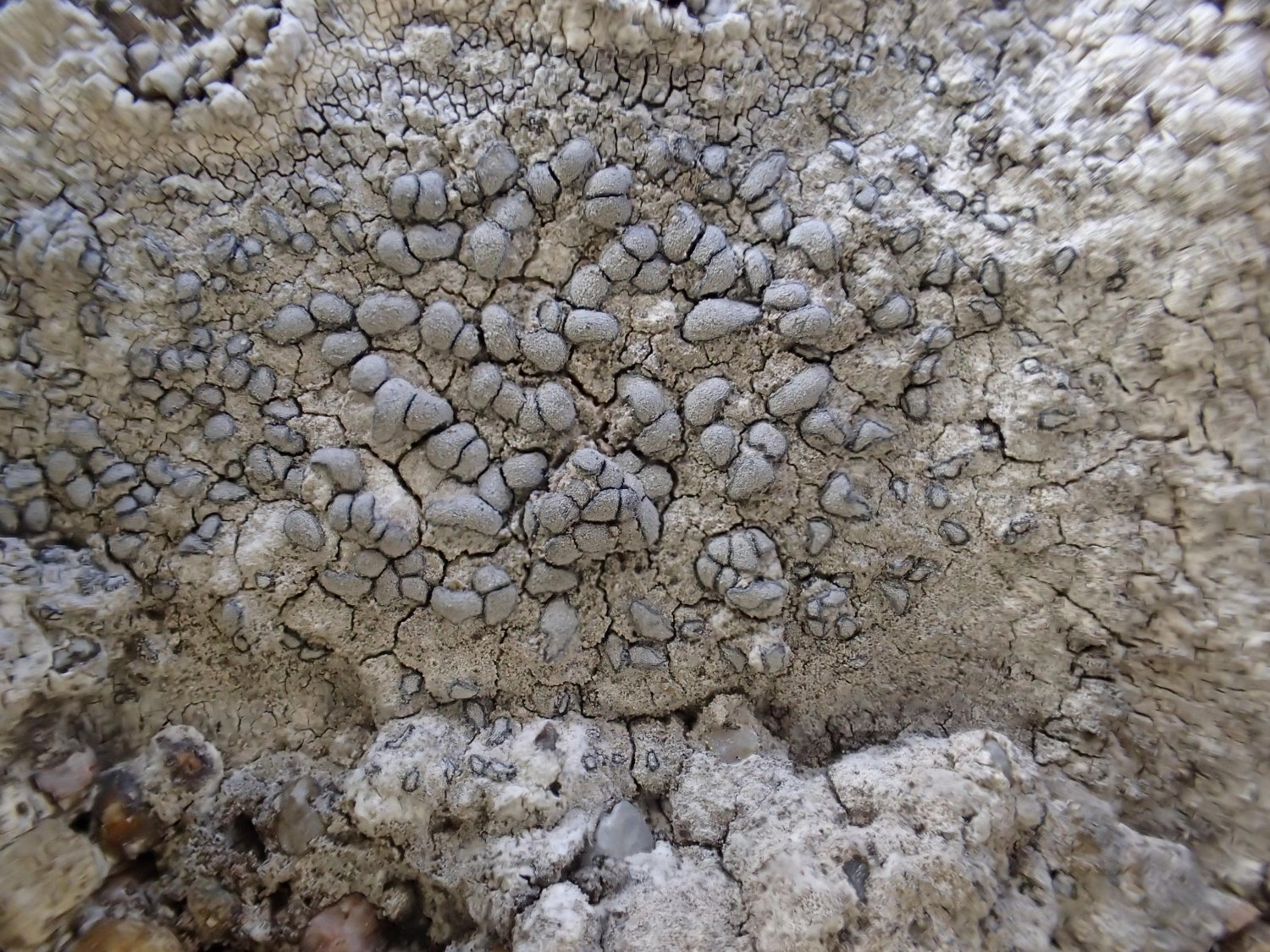
- Paralecanographa grumulosa

Scientific classification
- Domain: Eukaryota
- Kingdom: Fungi
- Division: Ascomycota
- Class: Arthoniomycetes
- Order: Arthoniales
- Family: Roccellaceae
- Genus: Paralecanographa; Ertz & Tehler (2011)
- Species: P. grumulosa

Binomial name
- Paralecanographa grumulosa (Dufour) Ertz & Tehler (2011)

= Paralecanographa =

Single-species fungal genus

Paralecanographa is a single-species fungal genus in the family Roccellaceae. The genus was established in 2011 when genetic studies revealed that its single species does not belong where it had been previously classified and needed its own separate genus. This unusual lichen begins life as a parasite on other coastal lichens before eventually taking over and replacing its host, producing small black fruiting bodies that can appear as either tiny slits or rounded discs.

== Taxonomy ==
Paralecanographa was erected in 2011 by Damien Ertz and Anders Tehler after a multigene phylogenetic analysis revealed that its single species, P. grumulosa, does not belong in Lecanographa, the genus where it had long been housed. Their protologue places the genus in the family Opegraphaceae (order Arthoniales) and designates P. grumulosa as the type species.

The taxon now called Paralecanographa grumulosa has a convoluted nomenclatural history. It was first published as Opegrapha grumulosa in 1818, later transferred to Lecanactis and then to Lecanographa. A sterile, cushion-like form growing on weathered sea-cliff lichens was described in 1993 as Ingaderia troglodytica. Molecular data showed that these sterile cushions are juvenile thalli of P. grumulosa, and Ertz and Tehler therefore synonymised Ingaderia troglodytica with P. grumulosa and lectotypified the name.

Phylogenetically, Paralecanographa forms a well-supported clade within Opegraphaceae sensu stricto, where it is sister to Paraschismatomma ochroleucum and only distantly related to Lecanographa. Its lichenicolous life strategy—beginning as a parasite on coastal Roccella and Dirina species—may account for its genetic distinctness despite superficial morphological similarity to Lecanographa.

== Description ==
Paralecanographa is an unusual lichen genus because its single species, P. grumulosa, begins life as a lichen-dweller rather than an independent thallus. The fungus first infiltrates coastal crustose lichens such as Roccella or Dirina, drawing on their resources; as it proliferates it gradually overruns the host and builds a thin, crust-like body of its own, leaving the original thallus distorted and chemically altered. Infected hosts show a marked rise in gyrophoric acid and a corresponding drop in erythrin, while their surface often becomes wart-like. Sterile cushions formerly described as Ingaderia troglodytica are now recognised as early, fruit-body-less stages of the same organism.

The mature lichen forms fruit bodies that range from fine, ink-line fissures (lirellae) to minute rounded discs, each slightly pinched at the base. Because the margin is composed solely of fungal tissue, there is no true continuation of the thallus around the rim; instead the exposed disc carries a dusting of fine white crystals known as pruina. Beneath this pruina the proper rim (excipulum) is conspicuously dark brown and rather carbonised, whereas the tissue immediately below the hymenium remains sealed off towards the substrate. When treated with potassium iodide the hymenial gel turns crimson, a diagnostic reaction within the order.

Inside the hymenium lie slender, two-walled asci surrounded by a mesh of colourless, branching paraphysoids. Each ascus releases eight colourless, ellipsoid to spindle-shaped ascospores divided by three (occasionally up to five) transverse walls; every spore is wrapped in a gelatinous envelope, or "halo", that swells when moisture fluctuates and aids dispersal. Simple flask-shaped pycnidia are often immersed between the fruit bodies and exude curved, thread-like conidia that provide an additional means of reproduction.
