= Dolichocarpus =

Scientific classification
- Domain: Eukaryota
- Kingdom: Fungi
- Division: Ascomycota
- Class: Arthoniomycetes
- Order: Arthoniales
- Family: Opegraphaceae
- Genus: Dolichocarpus; R.Sant. (1949)

Type species
- Dolichocarpus chilensis R.Sant. (1949)

Species
- D. chilensis D. seawardii

Genus of lichen

Dolichocarpus is a genus of lichens in the family Opegraphaceae. The genus was circumscribed by lichenologist Rolf Santesson in 1949, with Dolichocarpus chilensis assigned as the type species. This species, found in Chile, grows on cactus spines in a fog desert. For several decades the genus remained monotypic, until 2008 when André Aptroot added Dolichocarpus seawardii. This lichen, found on St Helena, forms large patches on wet, overhanging rock ledges.
