= Paraschismatomma =

Scientific classification
- Kingdom: Fungi
- Division: Ascomycota
- Class: Arthoniomycetes
- Order: Arthoniales
- Family: Opegraphaceae
- Genus: Paraschismatomma; Ertz & Tehler (2011)
- Species: P. ochroleucum

Binomial name
- Paraschismatomma ochroleucum (Zahlbr.) K.Knudsen, Ertz & Tehler (2011)

Synonyms
- Chiodecton ochroleucum Zahlbr. (1900); Platygrapha plurilocularis Zahlbr. (1902); Schismatomma pluriloculare (Zahlbr.) Zahlbr. (1923)

Genus of lichens

Paraschismatomma is a fungal genus in the family Opegraphaceae. It comprises a single species, Paraschismatomma ochroleucum, a crustose lichen found along the western coast of North America from northern California to Baja California. The lichen grows as a thin, greenish-white crust on dead twigs, branches, and tree bark near the ocean. First described by the lichenologist Alexander Zahlbruckner in 1900, P. ochroleucum has undergone several name changes before being classified in its own genus in 2011.

== Taxonomy ==
Paraschismatomma is a genus of lichen that was circumscribed by the lichenologists Damien Ertz and Anders Tehler in 2011. The genus is monospecific, which means it contains only one species: Paraschismatomma ochroleucum. This species serves as the type species for the genus, providing the defining example of the characteristics of Paraschismatomma. The type specimen for the taxon was collected by Blanche Trask from Santa Catalina Island, California. The lichen was found growing on twigs of Rhus integrifolia, a plant now known as Malosma laurina or lemonade berry.

The species has undergone several name changes since its initial description. It was first identified as Chiodecton ochroleucum by Alexander Zahlbruckner in 1900. Two years later, in 1902, he renamed it Platygrapha plurilocularis. Two decades after that, in 1922, he transferred it to the genus Schismatomma. Finally, in 2011, Kerry Knudsen, Damien Ertz, and Anders Tehler reclassified it under its current name, Paraschismatomma ochroleucum.

In terms of type specimens, which are used as reference points for species identification, the lectotype of Paraschismatomma ochroleucum is housed in the Natural History Museum Vienna (W). A lectotype is a specimen selected to serve as the defining example of the species when no holotype was originally designated. Additional type specimens, known as isolectotypes, are stored in the Farlow Herbarium and the New York Botanical Garden.

== Description ==
Paraschismatomma grows as a thin, crust-like layer on its substrate. Its thallus, or main body, is typically 0.2 to 1 mm thick with a slightly bumpy texture and may appear cracked while remaining cohesive. The upper surface of the thallus is greenish-white in color. A feature of P. ochroleucum is the frequent presence of soralia, which are specialized structures for asexual reproduction appearing as powdery eruptions on the lichen surface. These soralia start as small dots or spots but can merge to cover larger areas as the lichen ages.

The thallus is covered by a protective layer called the cortex, which is 20–40 μm thick and composed of intertwined fungal filaments. The sexual reproductive structures, called ascomata, may be numerous or absent in P. ochroleucum. When present, they are circular, sitting on the surface of the thallus with a constricted base, and measure 0.5–2 mm in diameter. The disc of the ascomata is flat or slightly concave, covered with a white, powdery substance, and surrounded by a prominent, wavy-edged margin.

Beneath the disc is a dark brown layer called the proper exciple, which can be up to 100 μm thick. The spore-producing layer is 50–65 μm high and contains branched and intertwined paraphysoids, which are sterile filaments between the spore-producing structures. The spores themselves are spindle-shaped, straight or curved, clear (hyaline), and typically have 7–11 septa (internal dividing walls). They measure 22–38 μm in length and 4–6 μm in width.

When tested with chemical spot tests, the thallus of P. ochroleucum is K−, C+ (red), KC+ (red), and P−. The lichen contains a secondary metabolite called lecanoric acid.

== Habitat and distribution ==
Paraschismatomma ochroleucum is a lichen species with a specific habitat preference and a limited geographical distribution. It is primarily found in coastal areas along the western coast of North America. This species shows a strong affinity for woody substrates. It is most commonly observed growing on dead twigs and branches. However, it can also be found on the bark of various living shrubs and trees.

Geographically, P. ochroleucum has a relatively narrow distribution range. It is found sparsely along the Pacific coast, extending from Monterey County in northern California southward to central Baja California in Mexico. This distribution pattern indicates that the species is adapted to the specific environmental conditions present in these coastal areas, which may include factors such as moderate temperatures, high humidity, and potentially salt spray from the ocean.
