= Ancistrosporella leucophila =

Conservation status
- Critically Endangered (IUCN 3.1)

Scientific classification
- Kingdom: Fungi
- Division: Ascomycota
- Class: Arthoniomycetes
- Order: Arthoniales
- Family: Roccellaceae
- Genus: Ancistrosporella
- Species: A. leucophila

Binomial name
- Ancistrosporella leucophila (Nyl.) Zahlbr. (1923)

Synonyms
- Opegrapha leucophila Nyl. (1867); Ancistrosporella psoromica Komposch, Aptroot & Hafellner (2002)

Species of lichen

Ancistrosporella leucophila is a rare species of corticolous (bark-dwelling crustose lichen in the family Roccellaceae. Originally described in 1867 from a specimen found in Colombia, it was reclassified in 2018, expanding its known range to include Venezuela. The lichen is characterised by its whitish body (thallus) and distinctive black, elongated reproductive structures. It grows in well-preserved tropical forests at varying elevations, from about 110 to 1,200 metres above sea level. Characteristics of A. leucophila include its hook-shaped spores and the presence of psoromic acid, which causes it to turn yellow-orange in a certain chemical spot test. Due to its extremely limited known distribution and the threats to its habitat from deforestation and land-use changes, the International Union for Conservation of Nature has classified A. leucophila as a Critically Endangered species.

== Taxonomy ==
The species was originally described as Opegrapha leucophila by William Nylander in 1867. The type specimen was found by collected by Alejandro Lindig, where he found it growing on bark at an elevation of 1,200 m (3,900 ft) in Piedecuesta, a mountainous region of the Andes. The taxon was transferred to the genus Ancistrosporella by Damien Ertz in 2018. The specific epithet leucophila refers to its whitish thallus. The species A. psoromica, originally described from Venezuela in 2002, was reduced to synonymy with A. leucophila by Ertz in 2018 due to morphological and chemical similarities.

== Description ==
Ancistrosporella leucophila has a whitish crustose thallus, forming a whitish layer on its substrate. Its reproductive structures (ascomata) appear as elongated, black, sessile lines (lirellae), which are generally simple. They typically measure between 0.5 and 1.5 millimetres in length, though they can range from 0.3 mm to 2 mm, with a width of 0.1 to 0.2 mm.

They ascospores of A. leucophila are narrow and divided into four sections by three septa (internal cross-walls). These spores have a unique shape, with one end curved or hooked, resembling a small fishhook. The spores typically measure 34–38 micrometres (μm) in length and 2.5–3.5 μm in width. Unlike some related species, the spores of A. leucophila lack a gelatinous sheath.

When tested with the para-phenylenediamine chemical spot test, the thallus of A. leucophila turns yellow-orange, indicating the presence of a lichen substance called psoromic acid.

== Distribution and habitat ==
Ancistrosporella leucophila has a limited known distribution in northern South America, with records from Colombia and Venezuela. The species was originally described from a single record in the humid tropical forests of Piedecuesta municipality, Santander Department, Colombia, at an elevation of 1,200 m (3,900 ft). In Colombia, it has been found in dry tropical forests and dry forest enclaves, while in Venezuela, it was collected in a tropical rainforest. Following the synonymisation of Ancistrosporella psoromica with A. leucophila, the species' known range extended to Venezuela. In Venezuela, it was recorded from the Alto Orinoco Municipality in Amazonas State, about 15 km (9.3 mi) west of La Esmeralda, at a much lower elevation of approximately 110 m (360 ft).

The lichen grows as an epiphyte on trees in well-preserved tropical forests, showing some adaptability to different forest types. The Venezuelan specimen was specifically noted growing on the rough bark of Goupia glabra, a tree species native to northern South America.

== Conservation status ==
Ancistrosporella leucophila is classified as a Critically Endangered species on the IUCN Red List. This assessment is based on its extremely limited area of occupancy of only 4 km^{2} (1.5 sq mi), known from a single location. The species faces significant threats from land use changes for recreational and tourism development, and deforestation and loss of forest cover. The species has not been recorded in recent inventories, with only a single known historical specimen from Colombia. A. leucophila is protected under Resolution 0213 of 1977 in Colombia, which prohibits its use and commercialisation.
