= Cresponea subpremnea =

Scientific classification
- Kingdom: Fungi
- Division: Ascomycota
- Class: Arthoniomycetes
- Order: Arthoniales
- Family: Opegraphaceae
- Genus: Cresponea
- Species: C. subpremnea

Binomial name
- Cresponea subpremnea (Kantvilas & Vězda) Kantvilas (2020)

Synonyms
- Lecanactis subpremnea Kantvilas & Vězda (1992)

Species of lichen

Cresponea subpremnea is a species of lichen in the family Opegraphaceae. Originally described from Tasmania in 1992, it was later recognised as a distinct species in 2020 after being confused with a similar relative for many years. The lichen forms thin, patchy films on the flaky bark of old trees in cool-temperate rainforests, particularly favouring ancient southern beech trees and tree fern trunks. It is distinguished by its long, narrow ascospores with multiple cross-walls and its preference for dry, sheltered microhabitats in Tasmania's western rainforests and similar forests in Victoria.

== Taxonomy ==
The species was first described as Lecanactis subpremnea in 1992 from Tasmania; the holotype was collected on an old trunk of Nothofagus cunninghamii near Waratah at about 600 m elevation. In 2020, on the basis of additional material and consistent differences from C. plurilocularis, it was removed from synonymy and formally transferred to Cresponea. Earlier treatments had tentatively united it with C. plurilocularis, but subsequent study of Tasmanian and mainland collections confirmed that C. subpremnea has narrower, longer and typically more-septate spores and other stable distinctions.

== Description ==
The thallus (lichen body) is very thin and often patchy to almost absent, appearing as a dull olivaceous grey-green, scurfy film that can form extensive, ill-delimited patches about 10–30 cm across. The photosynthetic partner (photobiont) is a trentepohlioid alga. Apothecia are up to about 1.7 mm wide; the disc is brown-black to black, plane to slightly concave and only rarely shows a very thin, pale yellowish-grey powdering (pruina) when very young, soon becoming epruinose. The apothecial margin (exciple) is prominent, persistent and entire. In section, the hypothecium is hyaline to pale yellowish and 60–110 micrometres (μm) thick and, unlike some others in the genus, it is not inspersed (not filled with oil droplets).

The spore-bearing layer (hymenium) is 90–130 μm thick and overlain by a dark yellow-brown surface layer that reacts K+ (olive-yellow); asci measure (65–)80–100 × (13–)16–18 μm. Sterile filaments among the asci (paraphysoids) are roughly 1.2–1.5 μm thick with slightly expanded, sometimes pigmented tips. Ascospores are fusiform, straight to slightly curved, and typically measure 31–54 × 5–6.5 μm with 6–11 septa; the internal spore chambers are mostly cylindrical and the spore wall is up to about 1.5 μm thick. Black, immersed pycnidia are uncommon and produce small bacilliform to fusiform microconidia 3.5–5.5 × 0.5–1 μm. No lichen products were detected by thin-layer chromatography in the examined material, although unpublished annotations have reported consimonyellin/isosimonyellin in some collections and simonyellin in C. plurilocularis; those findings were not confirmed in a later study.

== Habitat and distribution ==
Cresponea subpremnea occupies dry, sheltered and shaded microhabitats in cool-temperate rainforest. It grows exclusively on the flaky bark of the oldest trees, typically Nothofagus cunninghamii, and may also colonize the fibrous trunks of the tree fern Dicksonia antarctica where this provides a similarly dry niche. It forms very extensive thalli and can be conspicuous, yet it is rare overall and known from few collections. In Tasmania it is recorded mainly from the west and north-west, regions with the most extensive cool-temperate rainforest; it is also known from comparable rainforest in Victoria. Associated lichens in these forests include calicioid species and taxa of Lepraria and Micarea. By contrast, C. plurilocularis occurs on smooth bark of small-diameter trees and shrubs in warm-temperate to subtropical rainforest further north (New South Wales and Queensland), underlining the ecological separation between the two taxa.
