= Sparria =

Scientific classification
- Domain: Eukaryota
- Kingdom: Fungi
- Division: Ascomycota
- Class: Arthoniomycetes
- Order: Arthoniales
- Family: Opegraphaceae
- Genus: Sparria; Ertz & Tehler (2011)

Type species
- Sparria cerebriformis (Egea & Torrente) Ertz & Tehler (2011)

Species
- S. caboverdensis S. cerebriformis S. endlicheri

Genus of lichens

Sparria is a small genus of lichen-forming fungi in the family Opegraphaceae.

== Taxonomy ==
The genus was circumscribed in 2011 by the lichenologists Damien Ertz and Anders Tehler, with Sparria cerebriformis assigned as the type species. This European species, originally described in the genus Opegrapha, was later more well known as Arthonia endlicheri. The genus name honours the Dutch lichenologist Laurens Sparrius, "for his contribution to the Arthoniales".

== Description ==
The genus Sparria consists of crustose lichens that grow on rocks. The thallus, or lichen body, is typically thick and can vary in texture from smooth and continuous to cracked (rimose) or wart-like (verrucose), and it may sometimes appear as raised, bubble-like structures (bullate). The surface of the thallus is covered by a protective layer, known as the cortex. The symbiotic algae within the lichen belong to the green algal genus Trenteophlia. The reproductive structures in Sparria, the ascomata, are lirelliform (elongated and slit-like) to dendroid (tree-like) in shape. These structures are usually embedded within the thallus and often cluster together to form rounded or elongated, stroma-like formations. The hymenial disc, where the spores develop, is narrow and typically coated with a white, powdery substance known as pruina. The excipulum, which is the outer layer surrounding the hymenium, is dark brown, as is the hypothecium—the layer beneath the hymenium—which extends down to the substrate, anchoring the lichen.

Inside the ascomata, the supporting structures for the spores, called paraphysoids, are branched and interconnected (anastomosing. The asci, where the spores are produced, are cylindrical to club-shaped and contain eight spores. The ascospores are oblong-ellipsoid to spindle-shaped (fusiform), tapering at one end. When young, the spores are colourless (hyaline) but turn brown as they mature. These spores are somewhat muriform, meaning they have several transverse and longitudinal divisions, and are encased in a distinct gelatinous sheath.

Sparria also reproduces asexually through pycnidia, which are flask-shaped structures embedded in the thallus. The conidia (asexual spores) produced by the pycnidia are thread-like (filiform) and slightly curved.

Chemically, Sparria species contain lecanoric acid, and some species also produce erythrin, another secondary metabolite.

== Species ==
- Sparria caboverdensis Ertz & Tehler (2023) – Cape Verde
- Sparria cerebriformis (Egea & Torrente) Ertz & Tehler (2011)
- Sparria endlicheri (Garov.) Ertz & Tehler (2011)
