= Combea =

Scientific classification
- Domain: Eukaryota
- Kingdom: Fungi
- Division: Ascomycota
- Class: Arthoniomycetes
- Order: Arthoniales
- Family: Opegraphaceae
- Genus: Combea; De Not. (1846)

Type species
- Combea pruinosa De Not. (1846)

Species
- C. californica C. mollusca

Synonyms
- Hubbsia W.A.Weber (1965); Schizopelte Th.Fr. (1875); Schizopeltomyces Cif. & Tomas. (1953)

Genus of lichen

Combea is a genus of lichens in the family Opegraphaceae. It has two species. The genus was circumscribed by Italian botanist Giuseppe De Notaris in 1846.

The genus name of Combea is in honour of Francesco Comba (fl. 1845), an Italian lab assistant and draughtsman, from the Zoological Museum in Turin.

== Species ==
- Combea californica (Th.Fr.) Follmann & M.Geyer (1986)
- Combea mollusca (Ach.) Nyl. (1860)
