= Pentagenella =

Scientific classification
- Kingdom: Fungi
- Division: Ascomycota
- Class: Arthoniomycetes
- Order: Arthoniales
- Family: Opegraphaceae
- Genus: Pentagenella; Darb. (1897)

Type species
- Pentagenella fragillima Darb. (1897)

Species
- P. corallina P. fragillima P. gracillima P. langei P. ligulata

Synonyms
- Camanchaca Follmann & Peine (1999); Dictyographa Darb. (1897); Roccella sect. Pentagenella (Darb.) Follmann (1998)

Genus of lichen

Pentagenella is a genus of lichen-forming fungi in the family Opegraphaceae. It contains five species.

== Species ==
- Pentagenella corallina (Follmann & Peine) Tehler (2007)
- Pentagenella fragillima Darb. (1897)
- Pentagenella gracillima (Kremp.) Ertz & Tehler (2011)
- Pentagenella langei (Follmann) Ertz & Tehler (2011)
- Pentagenella ligulata (Peine & Follmann) Tehler (2007)
