= Cresponea flavosorediata =

Scientific classification
- Kingdom: Fungi
- Division: Ascomycota
- Class: Arthoniomycetes
- Order: Arthoniales
- Family: Opegraphaceae
- Genus: Cresponea
- Species: C. flavosorediata

Binomial name
- Cresponea flavosorediata Aptroot & M.Cáceres (2014)
- Holotype: Cuniã Ecological Station, Brazil

Species of lichen-forming fungus

Cresponea flavosorediata is a species of lichen in the family Arthoniaceae. Described from the Brazilian Amazon in 2014, this lichen has since been recorded in several states across Brazil, where it grows on smooth tree bark in primary rainforests. The species forms extensive olive-green to olive-brown crusts on bark, with distinctive yellow-olive powdery patches for asexual reproduction and bright greenish-yellow frosted fruiting bodies when present. It can be distinguished from related species in the genus Cresponea by the color of its reproductive structures and its moderately long ascospores divided by seven to nine cross-walls.

== Taxonomy ==
Cresponea flavosorediata was described as new in 2014 by André Aptroot and Marcela Cáceres. The type material was collected by the authors in 2012 from smooth tree bark in primary lowland rainforest at the Cuniã Ecological Station in Rondônia (Brazil), at an elevation of about 100 m (330 ft).

== Description ==
The thallus (lichen body) forms extensive, dull to slightly glossy crusts that can blanket large areas of bark; it is olivaceous green to olivaceous brown and lacks a contrasting border (no prothallus). Soralia are small, rounded, powdery patches that shed soredia (tiny clumps of algal cells wrapped in fungal threads for asexual spread); in C. flavosorediata they are always present; they are yellow-olive, mostly circular, 0.5–2.5 mm across, and may become numerous enough to merge and cover much of the surface. The photosynthetic partner is a Trentepohlia-type green alga.

Apothecia (sexual fruiting bodies) are sessile, round to slightly lobed, usually few in number, 0.5–1.6 mm across. Their discs are flat and densely coated with vivid greenish-yellow pruina; the margin is black and slightly higher than the disc, with yellow pruina on the inner face. Internally, the outer wall is blackened and rough; the hymenium is hyaline and stains blue with iodine (IKI+); the paraphysoids are branched with brown, heavily pruinose tips. Asci contain eight ascospores that are hyaline, narrowly club-shaped, 7–9-septate, and typically 26–38(–50) × 50–65 μm, often slightly curved. No pycnidia (asexual fruiting bodies) were seen. In spot tests, the thallus and apothecia are UV−, C−, P−, and K−; the epihymenium turns red with K (indicating an anthraquinone pigment). Thin-layer chromatography shows zeorin in the thallus along with a non-anthraquinone pigment.

=== Similar species ===
Cresponea flavosorediata can be distinguished from other sorediate members of the genus by its yellow-olive soralia, apothecia dusted with bright yellow pruina, and 7–9-septate ascospores that are moderately long. It can be distinguished from lookalikes: C. leprieurioides has whitish soredia and contains lecanoric acid; C. sorediata is a subarctic species known only in a sterile state; C. leprieurii and C. proximata lack soredia and differ in spore size and in the iodine reaction of the hymenium.

== Habitat and distribution ==
The species grows on smooth bark of trees in primary rainforest. It was originally known only from Brazil, with collections from the type locality in Rondônia. It has since been recorded in the Brazilian states Amazonas and Sergipe.
