= Ancistrosporella =

Scientific classification
- Kingdom: Fungi
- Division: Ascomycota
- Class: Arthoniomycetes
- Order: Arthoniales
- Family: Roccellaceae
- Genus: Ancistrosporella; G.Thor (1995)

Type species
- Ancistrosporella australiensis (G.Thor) G.Thor (1995)

Species
- A. australiensis A. curvata A. gracilior A. leucophila A. onchospora

Genus of lichens

Ancistrosporella is a genus of lichen-forming fungi in the family Roccellaceae. The genus was circumscribed in 1995 by Swedish lichenologist Göran Thor, with Ancistrosporella australiensis assigned as the type species. The International Union for Conservation of Nature has classified A. leucophila as a Critically Endangered species due to its limited known distribution in South America and the threats to its habitat from deforestation and land-use changes.

== Species ==
As of September 2024, Species Fungorum accepts six species of Ancistrosporella:

- Ancistrosporella australiensis (G.Thor) G.Thor (1995)
- Ancistrosporella curvata (Aptroot) Komposch (2002)
- Ancistrosporella gracilior (Nyl.) Lücking (2021)
- Ancistrosporella leucophila (Nyl.) Ertz (2018)
- Ancistrosporella onchospora (Nyl.) Ertz (2018)

The species A. psoromica, originally described from Venezuela in 2002, was reduced to synonymy with A. leucophila by Damien Ertz in 2018 due to morphological and chemical similarities.
