= Otto Vernon Darbishire =

British botanist (1870–1934)

Otto Vernon Darbishire (16 March 1870 – 17 October 1934) was a British botanist who specialised in marine algae and lichens. He served as a lecturer at several institutions, including the universities of Manchester, Newcastle, and Bristol, where he became the first Melville Wills Professor of Botany. Darbishire was recognised for his contributions to lichenology, particularly his taxonomic work on the genus Roccella. He was elected a Fellow of the Linnean Society in 1920 and served as president of the British Mycological Society and the Bristol Naturalists' Society. Several lichen species have been named in his honour, and he introduced important terminological concepts to the field.

== Education ==
Born in Conwy (Caernarfonshire, Wales), he was educated at several places and eventually graduated from the University of Oxford. After graduating with honours in botany at Oxford, where he studied under professor Vines, he went to Kiel University and first took up the study of algae, obtaining his PhD degree there in 1897.

== Academic career ==
During his time at Kiel, Darbishire was an assistant to Johannes Reinke, professor of botany, and began his investigations into the structure and development of lichens, a study which he pursued throughout his life.

He turned his attention to the taxonomy of lichens, publishing a monograph of the genus Roccella in 1899. Through his research and publications, he became one of the leading authorities on lichens and was entrusted with the determination of the lichens collected by the second Norwegian expedition of the Fram and also of those collected by the Swedish Antarctic Expedition.

He was later lecturer at the University of Manchester from 1898 to 1909; Armstrong College; Newcastle University from 1909 to 1911; and then Bristol University, first as lecturer and head of the Department of Botany and afterwards in 1919 as the first Melville Wills Professor of Botany, a position he held until 1934. His academic background was diverse, having received education in Dresden and Florence in addition to his studies at Bangor, Kiel, and Oxford.

His duties in Manchester necessitated his specialising to some extent in plant physiology, and his wide interests led him to take an active part in the work of the Central Committee for the Survey and Study of British Vegetation, which afterwards developed into the British Ecological Society.

== Research and contributions ==
Darbishire's research focused primarily on cryptogams, with particular emphasis on lichens and marine algae. Despite his heavy teaching and organising duties, he never lost his interest in lichens and during the last few years of his life published several contributions to lichenology in the Annals of Botany, in Flora and in the Annales de Cryptogamie exotique.

Darbishire was known as a good teacher who took an active personal interest in his students. While in Manchester, he voluntarily taught botany to a class of small children for some years, which led to the publication of a "Plant Book for Schools".

During the First World War, Darbishire served as commander of the Bristol University Officers' Training Corps and continued in this role for two years afterwards. He also made contributions to the war effort by organising the cultivation and distribution of medicinal plant seeds for the Board of Agriculture.

Darbishire was elected Fellow of the Linnean Society in 1920, and was president of the British Mycological Society in 1923. He later served as president of the Bristol Naturalists' Society from 1932 until his death in 1934 and was also president of the South Western Naturalists' Union.

== Personal life ==
Beyond his scientific pursuits, Darbishire maintained a deep appreciation for music and enjoyed slate quarrying as a recreational activity.

A few years before his death, Darbishire suffered a serious cycling accident that temporarily incapacitated him. Though his recovery was slow, he eventually regained his powers and resumed both his teaching and research. He died suddenly after an operation on 11 October 1934, at the age of sixty-four, leaving a widow and two young sons.

== Legacy ==
Darbishire has been credited for having introduced the terms amphithecium and parathecium in an 1898 monograph on the lichen genus Roccella. Some lichen species have been named in his honour: Pertusaria darbishireana Zahlbr. (1928); Anzia darbishireana Zahlbr. (1930); Pyrenodesmia darbishirei C.W.Dodge & G.E.Baker (1938); Arthonia darbishirei Follmann & B.Werner (2003); and Buellia darbishirei I.M.Lamb (1968).

== Selected publications ==
- Darbishire, O.V. (1898). Monographia Roccelleorum. Bibliotheca Bot. 45: 1–103.
- Darbishire, O.V. (1912). The lichens of the Swedish Antarctic Expedition. Wissensch. Ergebn. Schwed. Südpolar-Exped. 1901-1903 4 (2): 1–73.
- Darbishire, O.V. (1914). Some remarks on the ecology of lichens. Journal of Ecology 2: 71–82.
- Darbishire, O.V. (1914). The development of the apothecium in the lichen Peltigera. Rep. British Ass. Adv. Sci., Birmingham 1913. 713–714.
- Darbishire, O.V. (1923). Cryptogams from the Antarctic. Journal of Botany 61: 105–107.
- Darbishire, O.V. (1923). Lichens in British Antarctic Expedition, 1910. Natur. Hist. Report, Botany 3: 29–76.
- Darbishire, O.V. (1924). Some aspects of lichenology. Transactions of the British Mycological Society 10 (1–2): 10–28.
- Darbishire, O.V. (1926). The structure of Peltigera with especial reference to P. praetextata. Annals of Botany 40: 727–758.
- Darbishire, O.V. (1927). Über das Wachstum der Cephalodiem von Peltigera aphthosa L. Berichte der Deutschen Botanischen Gesellschaft 45: 221–228.
- Darbishire, O.V. (1927). The soredia of Peltigera erumpens Wain, and P. scutata Kbr. Transactions of the British Mycological Society 12 (1): 52–70.

== See also ==
- Category:Taxa named by Otto Vernon Darbishire
