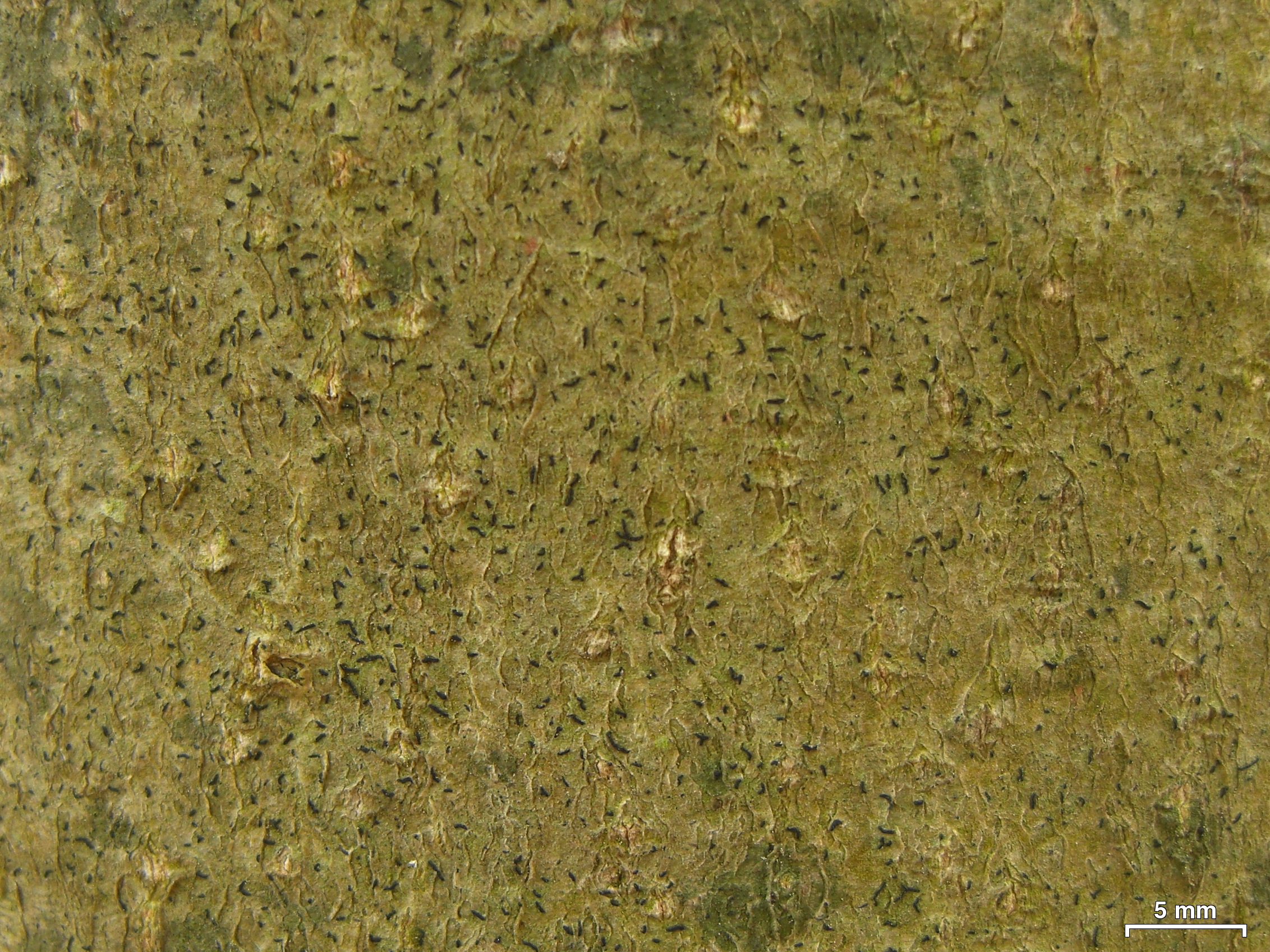
- Opegrapha vulgata

Scientific classification
- Kingdom: Fungi
- Division: Ascomycota
- Class: Arthoniomycetes
- Order: Arthoniales
- Family: Opegraphaceae; Stizenb. (1862)

Type genus
- Opegrapha Ach. (1809)

= Opegraphaceae =

Family of lichen

Opegraphaceae is a family of lichen-forming and lichenicolous fungi in the order Arthoniales. It was originally proposed by German lichenologist Ernst Stizenberger in 1862. It fell into disuse, but was resurrected in a molecular phylogenetic study of the order Arthoniales published in 2010. It now includes taxa that were previously referred to the family Roccellaceae, its sister group.

== Description ==
Most taxa in the family have a crustose thallus, although in rare cases it is fruticose. The lichens typically grow on bark, wood, or rocks. Some members, such as those in the genus Fouragea, grow on leaves. The family has a cosmopolitan distribution, but is predominant in tropical and semi-arid subtropical regions. The photobiont partner of Opegraphaceae is a member of the green algal genus Trentepohlia.

A variety of secondary chemicals have been identified in this family. The most common types are depsides, depsidones, dibenzofurans, and anthraquinones.

== Genera ==
As of March 2021, Species Fungorum accepts 15 genera and 167 species in the family Opegraphaceae. This is a list of the genera in the Opegraphaceae based on a 2020 review and summary of fungal classification by Wijayawardene and colleagues. Following the genus name is the taxonomic authority (those who first circumscribed the genus; standardized author abbreviations are used), year of publication, and the number of species:

- Combea De Not. (1846) – 2 spp.
- Cresponea Egea & Torrente (1993) – 22 spp.
- Dictyographa Müll.Arg. (1893) – 2 spp.
- Dolichocarpus R.Sant. (1949) – 2 spp.
- Fouragea Trevis. (1880) – 4 spp.
- Ingaderia Darb. (1897) – 3 spp.
- Nyungwea Sérus., Eb.Fisch. & Killmann (2006) – 3
- Opegrapha Ach. (1809) – ca. 100 + ca. 200 orphaned
- Paralecanographa Ertz & & Tehler (2011) – 1 sp.
- Paraschismatomma Ertz & Tehler (2011) – 1 sp.
- Pentagenella Darb. (1897) – 5 spp.
- Schizopelte Th.Fr. (1875) – 4 spp.
- Sclerophyton Eschw. (1824) – ca. 15 spp.
- Sparria Ertz & Tehler (2011) – 2 spp.
