= Bactrospora flavopruinosa =

Scientific classification
- Kingdom: Fungi
- Division: Ascomycota
- Class: Arthoniomycetes
- Order: Arthoniales
- Family: incertae sedis
- Genus: Bactrospora
- Species: B. flavopruinosa

Binomial name
- Bactrospora flavopruinosa F.Berger & Aptroot (2008)

Species of lichen-forming fungus

Bactrospora flavopruinosa, the dead cedar lichen, is a species of lignicolous (wood-dwelling) lichen of uncertain familial placement in the Arthoniales. Found in Bermuda, it was described as a new species in 2008. It forms thin, mostly hidden crusts on barkless Bermuda cedar wood, showing only as whitish patches with scattered yellow dots from its algal cells. The species is distinctive for its bright lemon-yellow, powdery fruiting bodies that contrast sharply with the black margins typical of related species, combined with exceptionally narrow, thread-like ascospores that do not fragment. It is known only from the Walsingham Nature Reserve in Bermuda, where it grows on the persistent dead trunks of Bermuda cedar trees killed by a twentieth-century scale insect outbreak, and forms part of a specialised community of wood- and bark-inhabiting lichens restricted to this habitat.

== Taxonomy ==
Bactrospora flavopruinosa was described as a new species in 2008 by Franz Berger and André Aptroot, based on material collected in 2007 from the Walsingham Nature Reserve on Bermuda. The type specimen was found on a decorticated (barkless) trunk of the endemic Bermuda cedar (Juniperus bermudiana). The holotype is kept in the Natural History Museum in London (BM), and isotypes (duplicate specimens) are in several European herbaria.

Bactrospora is a widespread but seldom abundant genus, usually corticolous and often overlooked because the thallus is weakly developed and specimens can be mistaken for non-lichenised fungi. The authors placed the species in Bactrospora (often treated in the family Roccellaceae)) based on a combination of features. It has a crustose thallus that lacks a cortex (a protective outer layer) and contains a Trentepohlia (green algal) photobiont. Its apothecia are black with a carbonised (blackened) excipulum that extends below the spore-bearing layer (hymenium). Microscopically, the asci are cylindrical, each with eight spores, and have the characteristic "Bactrospora type" tip, including an iodine-positive apical ring. The ascospores are long, colourless, and divided by many septa, matching the patellarioides spore type used within the genus. Within Bactrospora, B. flavopruinosa is set apart by its consistently yellow, pruinose apothecial discs and its especially narrow, thread-like spores that do not break into fragments.

== Description ==
The thallus of Bactrospora flavopruinosa is mostly immersed in the outer surface of the wood, and shows up only as a thin whitish patch with scattered yellow dots from its algal partner. In cross-section the thallus is very thin (about 20 μm) and homoiomerous (made largely of algal cells), with only a few short, colourless fungal hyphae reaching the surface. Some areas are exposed while others are still covered by a thin film of the wood, giving a mottled look under magnification. The photobiont is Trentepohlia-like, forming branched filaments of broadly spindle-shaped, rough-walled cells about 11–18 × 7–9 μm.

The apothecia are sessile, round to slightly top-shaped, 0.3–0.8 mm across and about 0.2 mm tall. Their discs are flat and coated in a bright lemon-yellow, powdery pruina; the margin is also pruinose, but looks glossy black where the coating has rubbed off, and is often toothed. Microscopically, the hymenium is clear and colourless, 100–150 μm tall, and iodine-positive; above it, the epihymenium contains bright yellow crystals that turn ochraceous in section after treatment with potassium hydroxide solution (K). The asci are cylindrical (60–75 × 6–8 μm) and each contains eight long, colourless ascospores with 9–15 septa; the spores are 45–55 × 1.5–2.5 μm, straight to slightly curved, and do not break apart. Pycnidia have not been observed. In K, the yellow pruina releases a yellow solution and briefly forms sulphur-yellow, needle-like crystals before dissolving again. Based on this reaction, the authors suggested the pruina may contain naphthopyran compounds such as simonyellin or protosimonyellin.

=== Similar species ===
In a global identification key to Bactrospora, B. flavopruinosa keys out by its yellow-pruinose apothecia together with narrow ascospores. Several other Bactrospora species have similarly thread-like (filiform) ascospores of the patellarioides type and an iodine-positive (amyloid) excipulum, including B. patellarioides, B. brodoi, B. carneopallida, B. cascadensis, and B. mesospora. However, none of these combines such narrow ascospores with lemon-yellow, pruinose apothecia. On Bermuda, B. flavopruinosa occurs in the same habitats as B. myriadea and B. denticulata, but those species have black, non-pruinose apothecia and a non-amyloid excipulum. B. denticulata also has longer ascospores (over 70 μm) and strongly toothed (denticulate) apothecial margins, so B. flavopruinosa can be separated both in the field and under the microscope. Unlike some yellow pruina-producing members of the genus, the yellow pruina in B. flavopruinosa does not turn reddish-magenta in the K reaction.

== Habitat and distribution ==
Bactrospora flavopruinosa is a lignicolous lichen (growing on wood) known only from its type locality in the Walsingham Nature Reserve (the Walsingham "Jungle") in Hamilton Parish, Bermuda. The type specimen was collected about 3 m above sea level on a well-lit but sheltered, barkless trunk of the endemic Bermuda cedar (Juniperus bermudiana), on firm, sun-bleached wood near a protected bay in limestone terrain formed by partly collapsed cave roofs. The reserve preserves a small remnant of Bermuda's pre-colonial lowland woodland, dominated by native trees including Bermuda olivewood (Elaeodendron laneanum), Bermuda palmetto (Sabal bermudana), white stopper (Eugenia monticola), and hackberry (Celtis laevigata), which provide stable bark and wood surfaces compared with many introduced trees that shed bark quickly. The history of Bermuda cedar is especially relevant: a mid-20th-century scale-insect outbreak ("Cedar blight") killed about 99% of the population, but some dead, decorticated trunks and branches have persisted for decades because the resin-rich wood decays slowly, creating a long-lasting substratum for uncommon lichens. At Walsingham, B. flavopruinosa occurs alongside other Bactrospora species such as B. myriadea and the locally rarer B. denticulata, as well as wood- and bark-inhabiting lichens including Arthopyrenia minor, Caloplaca sarcopisioides, Chrysothrix xanthina, several Hafellia species, and Nadvornikia hawaiiensis; the authors suggested that protecting remaining dead cedar trunks, particularly in reserves like Walsingham, would help conserve these specialised lichen communities.
