= Bactrospora arthonioides =

Scientific classification
- Kingdom: Fungi
- Division: Ascomycota
- Class: Arthoniomycetes
- Order: Arthoniales
- Family: incertae sedis
- Genus: Bactrospora
- Species: B. arthonioides

Binomial name
- Bactrospora arthonioides Egea & Torrente (1993)

Species of lichen

Bactrospora arthonioides is a species of corticolous (bark-dwelling) lichen of uncertain familial placement in the order Arthoniales. It was first discovered in 1993 from specimens collected in Tasmania's Gordon River gorge, where it grows on the bark of large trees in sheltered rainforest valleys. The species is characterised by its very thin fruiting body margins and distinctive thread-like ascospores that are narrowed at one end. While originally known only from Tasmania, it has since been found in New Zealand.

== Taxonomy ==
Bactrospora arthonioides was described as new to science by José María Egea Fernández and Pilar Torrente in a revision of Bactrospora published in 1993. The holotype was collected in south-western Tasmania, near Strathgordon in the Gordon River gorge, from the trunk of a large tree in a sheltered valley with Nothofagus, at about 300 m elevation (30 August 1981; H. Sipman 16078; holotype in U). In their treatment, Egea and Torrente separated the species on a combination of ascus and ascospore features and the exceptionally thin excipulum ("rim" tissue of the fruiting body). They noted its closest look-alikes are B. leptoloma and B. mesospora, but B. arthonioides differs by having a very thin excipulum and long, many-celled spores that are narrowed at one end; B. leptoloma also shifts to a different spore type at maturity.

== Description ==
The thallus is a thin, whitish crust largely sunk within the outer bark (endophloeodal), forming an effuse film without obvious cortex or distinct margins. No lichen substances were detected by thin-layer chromatography.

The fruiting bodies (apothecia) are black, scattered and round to slightly irregular, about 0.2–0.4 mm in diameter. They begin immersed but soon break through the surface and sit flat on the bark; they lack a frosty bloom (epruinose), have no conspicuous margin (immarginate), and the discs are flat to slightly convex. The excipulum is very thin, about 15–25 micrometres (μm) laterally and 5–12 μm at the base, and open beneath the hymenium. The hymenium is about 75–80(–100) μm tall, and the subhymenium is pale brown (70–100 μm). Paraphysoid tips branch and interconnect to form a dark, reticulate cap (pseudoepithecium). Asci are slender, measuring 65–80 × 11–14 μm. Ascospores are of the patellarioides-type: long, narrow, and multi-septate, here 40–60 × 3–4 μm with 10–15 septa, and characteristically tapered at one end; in practice, they look like very fine, many-celled threads that may split into segments. Pycnidia were not observed.

== Habitat and distribution ==
The species was originally only known from the type locality in Tasmania. While initially described from a single locality, the species is now known to be locally common throughout the extensive rainforest areas of the western and north-western regions. It typically inhabits the relatively dry, cracked bark of mature trees, with the peeling bark of aged Nothofagus cunninghamii trunks being a characteristic substrate. In these locations, B. arthonioides frequently occurs alongside Lecanactis abietina, L. mollis, and various Micarea species. The species can be distinguished from the superficially similar coastal woodland species B. paludicola by having protruding apothecia, a thinner proper exciple, somewhat shorter ascospores, and by lacking pycnidia. In 2017, the lichen was reported growing on a trunk of Phyllocladus trichomanoides on New Zealand's North Island. The lichen has also been documented as part of an extensive corticolous lichen community growing on Pōhutukawa (the endemic New Zealand Christmas tree, Metrosideros excelsa).
