= Vigneronia spieri =

Scientific classification
- Domain: Eukaryota
- Kingdom: Fungi
- Division: Ascomycota
- Class: Arthoniomycetes
- Order: Arthoniales
- Family: Roccellaceae
- Genus: Vigneronia
- Species: V. spieri

Binomial name
- Vigneronia spieri (Aptroot & Sparrius) Ertz (2014)

Synonyms
- Schismatomma spierii Aptroot & Sparrius (2008)

Species of lichen

Vigneronia spieri is a species of corticolous (bark-dwelling), crustose lichen in the family Roccellaceae. It is found in the Galápagos Islands, mainland Ecuador and the Antilles (Curaçao).

== Taxonomy ==
The lichen was first described scientifically by lichenologists André Aptroot and Laurens Sparrius in 2008, as a member of the genus Schismatomma. The type specimen was collected by the first author from Cerro Alcedo on Isabela Island (Galápagos) at an altitude of 250 m (820 ft); there, in an area of dry lowlands with basalt outcrops, it was found growing on the bark of Bursera graveolens. The lichen has also been recorded from Santa Cruz and Santiago islands. The species epithet honours Dutch lichenologist Leo Spier, who assisted the authors with thin-layer chromatography of lichen specimens. In 2014, following a large-scale phylogenetic revision of the Roccellaceae, Damien Ertz transferred the taxon to the newly circumscribed genus Vigneronia, in which it is the type species.

== Description ==
The lichen has a crustose thallus, coloured white to pinkish to ochraceous, and covering an area of up to about 10 cm (4 in). The thallus, which lacks a cortex and measures up to 0.1 mm thick, is surrounded by a grey prothallus 2 mm wide. Vigneronia spieri has a trentepohlioid photobiont partner. The ascomata of the lichen are in the form of apothecia–circular to elongated to lirellate with a diameter of up to about 1 by 4 mm; they are surrounded by a thalline margin the same colour as the thallus and about 0.1 mm in width. Ascospores are hyaline and fusiform, and typically have 3 septa (sometimes two); they measure 30–37 by 5–6 μm.
