= Lecanactis malmideoides =

Scientific classification
- Domain: Eukaryota
- Kingdom: Fungi
- Division: Ascomycota
- Class: Arthoniomycetes
- Order: Arthoniales
- Family: Roccellaceae
- Genus: Lecanactis
- Species: L. malmideoides

Binomial name
- Lecanactis malmideoides Kalb & Aptroot (2018)

Species of lichen

Lecanactis malmideoides is a little-known species of corticolous (bark-dwelling), crustose lichen in the family Roccellaceae. First described in 2018, it is found in Brazil. Characteristics of the lichen include its pruinose discs, thin and glossy black margins, and ascospore structure.

== Taxonomy ==
Lecanactis malmideoides was formally described by lichenologists Klaus Kalb and André Aptroot in 2018. The type specimen was collected in the Serra do Mar, Serra do Garraozinho between Mogi das Cruzes and Bertioga, São Paulo, Brazil, on tree bark in a primary rainforest at an elevation of 850 m (2,790 ft). The specimen was collected in March 1979 by the first author. The specific epithet malmideoides refers to the similarity of this species with members of the genus Malmidea.

== Description ==
The thallus of Lecanactis malmideoides is continuous, minutely granular, dull, thin, and locally abraded. It is typically ochraceous but often appears darker due to the visible underlying brown bark. The thallus is surrounded by a dark brown hyphal hypothallus line about 0.3 mm wide. Apothecia are sessile with a constricted base, round to somewhat crenate (scalloped) or lobate, measuring 0.3–1.1 mm in diameter and 0.2–0.3 mm high. The disc is brown, flat, and sparingly to thickly yellowish-green with pruina, with a glossy black margin about 0.05 mm wide. The hamathecium is about 75 μm high with a brown epihymenium, and both the excipulum and hypothecium are black. Ascospores are hyaline (translucent), and filiform (thread-like). They have between 7 and 11 septa (internal partitions), measure 30–45 by 3.0–4.0 μm, are not or slightly curved, and lack a gelatinous sheath. Pycnidia were not observed to occur in this species.

Chemical spot tests on the thallus show it to be UV−, C−, and K−. No thin-layer chromatography was performed in the analysis of the species.

== Habitat and distribution ==
Lecanactis malmideoides is found on tree bark in a primary rainforest and at the time of its publication was known to occur only in Brazil.
