= Vigneronia =

Scientific classification
- Kingdom: Fungi
- Division: Ascomycota
- Class: Arthoniomycetes
- Order: Arthoniales
- Family: Roccellaceae
- Genus: Vigneronia; Ertz (2014)

Type species
- Vigneronia spieri (Aptroot & Sparrius) Ertz & Bungartz (2014)

Species
- V. caceresiana V. cypressi V. mexicana V. robustula V. spieri

Genus of lichens

Vigneronia is a genus of lichen-forming fungi in the family Roccellaceae. It comprises five species. Vigneronia lichens form thin, smooth crusts on bark or rock and are recognized by their distinctive black, wavy, slit-like fruiting bodies that erupt through the surface. The genus was established in 2014 by Damien Ertz and is named after his wife Nathalie Vigneron, who accompanied him on collecting expeditions in the Caribbean.

== Taxonomy ==
The genus was circumscribed in 2014 by Damien Ertz, with Vigneronia spieri assigned as the type species. This species, originally described as Schismatomma spieri from collections made in the Galápagos Islands, has since been recorded from mainland Ecuador and the Antilles (Curaçao). The genus is named after Ernst's wife, Nathalie Vigneron, who accompanied him on collecting trips.

Molecularly, Vigneronia nests deep within the family Roccellaceae. In the Ertz and colleagues cladogram it is sister to the then-newly described Crocellina clade, although that relationship receives only weak statistical support. Morphologically, Vigneronia differs from Schismatomma—to which its type species was once assigned—by lacking a true thalline margin around the lirellae and by having broader, less needle-like spores; it also differs from Crocellina in the absence of a corticate thallus and of the saffron-yellow medullary layer that characterises the latter. These diagnostic traits, together with the distinct molecular signal, underpin its recognition as a separate genus within the family.

== Description ==
Species of Vigneronia form a thin, crust-like body (the thallus) that lacks an outer protective skin (cortex). The surface is usually smooth and may be dull white, grey or occasionally tinged pink, blending discreetly into the bark or rock it coats. A film of orange-green algal cells (Trentepohlia) is embedded throughout the fungal tissue and provides the photosynthetic partner of the symbiosis. Chemical tests show no reaction with potassium hydroxide, and thin-layer chromatography typically detects only simple fatty acids; in some specimens the lichen substances erythrin or gyrophoric acid are also present, though in trace amounts.

The reproductive structures (ascomata) are the most conspicuous features of Vigneronia. They appear as black, often strongly sinuous slits (technically lirellae) that erupt through the thallus and may reach 0.5–4 mm long by up to 1 mm wide. Each lirella is rimmed by a persistent black margin that may be dusted with a faint white bloom; unlike many relatives, there is no true thalline margin. Internally, a firm brown-black excipulum forms the side-walls, while a pale- to dark-brown hypothecium supports the spore-bearing layer. The asci are club-shaped and release eight colourless ascospores, each spindle-shaped, commonly curved, divided by three cross-walls and measuring roughly 23–39 μm long by 4.5–6 μm wide; the spores lack the gelatinous outer coat typical of many other members of the Roccellaceae. Minute black pycnidia (asexual fruit bodies) are often scattered in the thallus; they exude curved, needle-fine conidia about 10–17 μm long and less than 1 μm thick that assist in dispersal.

== Species ==
As of June 2025, Species Fungorum (in the Catalogue of Life) accept five species of Vigneronia:

- Vigneronia caceresiana (Kalb & Aptroot) Lücking & Herrera-Camp. (2019) – Brazil
- Vigneronia cypressi (R.C.Harris) Ertz & Tehler (2014) – Florida; French West Indies
- Vigneronia mexicana Herrera-Camp., Bautista & Lücking (2019) – Mexico
- Vigneronia robustula (Nyl.) Ertz & Tehler (2014) – Chile
- Vigneronia spieri (Aptroot & Sparrius) Ertz (2014) – Galápagos Islands; Ecuador; Antilles
