= Lecanactis proximans =

Conservation status
- Critically Endangered (IUCN 3.1)

Scientific classification
- Kingdom: Fungi
- Division: Ascomycota
- Class: Arthoniomycetes
- Order: Arthoniales
- Family: Roccellaceae
- Genus: Lecanactis
- Species: L. proximans

Binomial name
- Lecanactis proximans (Nyl.) Zahlbr. (1923)

Synonyms
- Lecidea proximans Nyl. (1863)

Species of lichen

Lecanactis proximans is a species of terricolous (ground-dwelling) crustose lichen in the family Roccellaceae. It has been assessed as Critically Endangered for the IUCN Red List. It is known only from a single location in the Cerros Orientales (Eastern Hills) of Bogotá, Colombia.

== Taxonomy ==
The species was first described by William Nylander in 1863 as Lecidea proximans. It was later transferred to the genus Lecanactis by Alexander Zahlbruckner in 1923.

== Description ==
Lecidea proximans is a crustose lichen that grows on soil and is strongly attached to its substrate. It has a powdery to leprose consistency. The apothecia (fruiting bodies) have a thickened margin and greyish pruina. The species grows in shaded areas.

== Conservation ==
Lecidea proximans is listed as Critically Endangered (CR) on the IUCN Red List. The species is known from only one location with an estimated area of occupancy of 4 km². Its habitat has been severely affected by logging and urban expansion. Despite recent surveys in similar habitats in the Eastern Hills of Bogotá, the species has not been found again since its original collection by Alejandro Lindig. The main threats to Lecidea proximans are habitat alteration, deforestation, and expansion of agricultural, industrial, and urban areas. The species is protected under Resolution 0213 of 1977, which prohibits its use and commercialisation in Colombia.

== Distribution and habitat ==
The species is known only from a single record in the montane humid forests of the Cerros Orientales (Eastern Hills) in Bogotá, Colombia, at an elevation of 2,700 metres above sea level.
