= Lecanactis minutissima =

Scientific classification
- Domain: Eukaryota
- Kingdom: Fungi
- Division: Ascomycota
- Class: Arthoniomycetes
- Order: Arthoniales
- Family: Roccellaceae
- Genus: Lecanactis
- Species: L. minutissima

Binomial name
- Lecanactis minutissima Weerakoon & Aptroot (2015)

Species of lichen

Lecanactis minutissima is a species of corticolous (bark-dwelling), crustose lichen in the family Roccellaceae. Found in Sri Lanka, the lichen is characterised by its pale ochraceous thallus and sessile apothecia with dark brown discs, covered with thick white granular pruina.

== Taxonomy ==
Lecanactis minutissima was formally described by Gothamie Weerakoon and André Aptroot in 2015. The type specimen was collected by the first author in Morningside, Sooriyakanda, on the bark of a dead Syzygium tree.

== Description ==
This lichen has a crustose, non-corticate, and continuous thallus with a dull, pale ochraceous appearance. It grows epiperidermally without a surrounding prothallus. The algae in the thallus are trentepohlioid. The apothecia are sessile, round to angular or ellipsoidal, with a dark brown disc measuring approximately 0.2–0.5 mm in width, covered with a thick white granular pruina. The proper margin of the apothecia is flush with the disc, concolorous, and equally pruinose. The epihymenium has a thick layer of large crystals. The hypothecium and excipulum are black, except for a hyaline layer of large crystals on the excipulum's outside. The hamathecium is not inspersed, weakly amyloid, with anastomosing paraphysoids. The asci are cylindrical and of the Abietina-type. Ascospores are hyaline, consistently contain three septa, curved, somewhat clavate, and measure 13–18 by 2–3 μm. Pycnidia were not observed in this species. The lichen's chemistry, as tested with standard chemical spot tests, is negative for UV, C, K, KC, and Pd reactions, and no substances were detected through the use the thin-layer chromatography.

The lichen is most similar to Lecanactis dubia and Lecanographa illecebrosula, but differs from them in ascospore size, apothecium margin characteristics, and chemical reactions.

== Habitat and distribution ==
Lecanactis minutissima is found in wet, mountainous tropical forests, where it grows on the stringy bark of dead trees. At the time of its original publication, it was only known to occur in Sri Lanka.
