= Bactrospora brodoi =

Scientific classification
- Kingdom: Fungi
- Division: Ascomycota
- Class: Arthoniomycetes
- Order: Arthoniales
- Family: incertae sedis
- Genus: Bactrospora
- Species: B. brodoi

Binomial name
- Bactrospora brodoi Egea & Torrente (1993)
- Holotype: Fundy National Park, New Brunswick, Canada

Species of lichen

Bactrospora brodoi is a corticolous (bark-dwelling) crustose lichen of uncertain family placement in the order Arthoniales. Described in 1993 by José María Egea and Pilar Torrente and named for the Canadian lichenologist Irwin M. Brodo, it forms a very thin, mostly immersed pale film with tiny black, rimless discs and produces very slender, many-celled ascospores; a conspicuous asexual stage with larger pycnidia is frequent in Fennoscandia and parts of eastern Canada. The species is rare and boreal, known from eastern Canada and Fennoscandia, with a doubtful outlier reported from coastal California. It favours long-continuity, humid spruce forests, especially the dead, bark-covered lower twigs of very old Norway spruce (Picea abies); in Canada it also occurs on yellow birch (Betula alleghaniensis) and eastern white-cedar (Thuja occidentalis) in swampy stands. Forestry that removes veteran host trees or dries these habitats is the main threat; it is assessed as critically endangered in Norway, vulnerable in Sweden, and regionally extinct in Finland.

== Taxonomy ==
Bactrospora brodoi was described as new to science by José María Egea Fernández and Pilar Torrente in their 1993 revision of Bactrospora. The holotype was collected in Fundy National Park, New Brunswick (Point Wolfe) on the bark of a very large, old yellow birch (Betula alleghaniensis) growing in a steep, south-facing red spruce–birch forest; the specimen was distributed as Brodo's "Lichenes Canadenses Exsiccati" no. 152 under Bactrospora cf. dryina (Gowan 3852; holotype GZU, isotype M). The authors explicitly named the species in honour of the Canadian lichenologist Irwin M. Brodo.

Earlier Canadian material had been referred to B. dryina, and the authors corrected those records in establishing B. brodoi. They also cited additional historical collections from Newfoundland (Coal River; A. Waghorne, 1897), consolidating the species' status as a Canadian taxon. "Coal River" refers to the mouth of today's Serpentine River, Bay of Islands region. In separating B. brodoi from similar species, they noted its long, many-septate spores that narrow towards one end and its very thin excipulum, with slightly smaller conidia than close relatives.

Subsequent work on Nordic material showed that historical identifications under Bactrospora patellarioides made by Sigfrid Almqvist, including Georg Lettau's B. patellarioides f. hapalocheila, belong to B. brodoi. Re-examination of Finnish collections cited by Almqvist, together with fresh Swedish material, confirmed this interpretation and placed these names in synonymy with B. brodoi. Some Nordic authors place Bactrospora in the family Roccellaceae, a group whose members typically partner with green algae of the genus Trentepohlia; within Bactrospora, B. brodoi belongs to the patellarioides group, whose needle-like, many-septate ascospores fragment after discharge from the ascus. Some non-type Canadian material shows a thin to rather well-developed apothecial margin, but anatomy otherwise matches B. brodoi.

== Description ==
The thallus of B. brodoi forms a very thin, whitish film that is mostly immersed in the outer bark (endophloeodal), lacking a distinct cortex or medulla. The photobiont is Trentepohlia. In section it is to about 50 micrometres (μm) thick and shows positive iodine reactions (I^{+}; K/I^{+}). The black fruiting bodies (apothecia) are scattered, roundish to slightly irregular, flat to gently convex, without a frosty coating (epruinose) and lacking a raised rim (immarginate), typically 0.3–0.7 mm in diameter. The excipulum—the dark rim tissue around the disc—is thin and open beneath, measuring up to about 25–30 μm at the top and 25–40 (up to 70) μm at the base. The hymenium is 80–125 μm tall and overlies a pale to dark-brown subhymenium 125–250 (up to 300) μm thick. Paraphysoid tips branch and interconnect to form a loose reticulum.

Asci are slender, measuring 70–90 × 14–16 μm, and contain narrow, many-celled ascospores of the patellarioides-type, (44–)55–75 × (3–)3.5–4 μm, with (10–)14–24 cross-walls (septa) and typically tapered at one end; in practical terms they look like very fine threads divided into many tiny cells. Pycnidia (asexual structures) are immersed and roughly spherical (globose, and produce straight to slightly curved conidia 7–11 × 1 μm. No lichen products were detected by standard chemical tests. Two pycnidial morphs occur. The first consists of small, partly immersed, black, globose pycnidia (to about 0.1 mm) producing needle-shaped (acicular) conidia 7–11 × 1 μm. The second, frequent in Scandinavian material and some Canadian collections but absent from the type, forms larger pycnidia to about 0.5 mm; the wall soon breaks down, exposing a yellowish-white conidial mass and an irregular black rim, and yields spindle-shaped conidia 5–7.5 × 2–2.5 μm.

Compared with B. patellarioides, B. brodoi has smaller, immarginate apothecia and acicular ascospores that narrow toward one end, with more septa and shorter cells; B. corticola and B. dryina differ in having Dryina-type spores that fragment within the ascus. In the field, colonies of B. brodoi are usually small patches but may occasionally extend 10–15 cm along old spruce twigs, and the larger, early-opening pycnidia expose a pale conidial mass that appears as tiny whitish flecks on the bark.

== Habitat and distribution ==
In Canada the species is confirmed from the type locality in New Brunswick, where it grew on the bark of a mature yellow birch on a steep, slightly to moderately shaded, south-facing slope in mixed red spruce–birch forest; historical Newfoundland material comes from Coal River. Additional Canadian records include further sites in New Brunswick and a record from Prince Edward Island. Elsewhere in eastern Canada the species occupies the basal few metres of medium- to large-diameter trunks of Thuja occidentalis in old, swampy stands near streams or rivers; in these sites it usually occurs on only one or a few trees, but can cover several square decimetres on favourable trunks. Associated taxa on yellow birch sites include Calicium viride, Chaenothecopsis savonica, Cliostomum griffithii, Opegrapha niveoatra, O. varia, and Variolaria amara; in Thuja swamps the pin lichen Chaenotheca laevigata is frequent. It has also been recorded from California's Santa Rosa Island, where it was growing on Heteromeles arbutifolia. Material from Santa Rosa Island matches B. brodoi morphologically but occurs in a contrasting ecology; its status remains uncertain pending molecular data, and some north-western records have proved to be B. cascadensis.

In Europe it is confined to the boreal zone: it is recorded from Sweden (Jämtland) and Finland (on Picea abies), and from Norway, where occurrences are clustered in inner Trøndelag; there is also a record from Karelia in north-west Russia. In Fennoscandia the lichen is largely confined to very old, slow-growing Picea abies ("skirt spruces") in sheltered, humid microhabitats—typically the dead, bark-covered lower twigs protected from direct wetting yet in consistently moist air—within two forest settings: swampy middle-boreal spruce forest and humid bilberry spruce forest at higher elevations. Host trees are commonly 250–300 years old; the species is only rarely on trunks, and more rarely still on coarse-barked Betula pubescens or Salix caprea (within about 100–515 m). Associated Nordic epiphytes include Schismatomma pericleum, Opegrapha vulgata, and Chrysothrix candelaris; in Norway a broader "dry-bark" assemblage with Lecanactis abietina, Cliostomum griffithii, and pin lichen genera (Calicium, Chaenotheca, Chaenothecopsis) occurs in the same microhabitat. By early 2014 it was documented from about 26 Norwegian and 7 Swedish localities; occurrences cluster in suboceanic central Scandinavia and are absent from drier, more continental districts.

== Conservation ==
In Norway B. brodoi is listed as critically endangered (CR) under criterion D1 (very small population). The main threats are forestry operations that remove present and potential host trees, disrupt long habitat continuity, and alter local microclimates; under modern rotation forestry practices, it takes a very long time for suitable 'skirt spruce' structure to redevelop. Small, isolated populations are also vulnerable to stochastic events (e.g. storm or fire). Sweden assesses the species as vulnerable, Finland as regionally extinct; across its range the steep decline in suitable veteran spruce structure owing to clear cut forestry and wetland ditching is the primary pressure.
