= Bactrospora angularis =

Scientific classification
- Kingdom: Fungi
- Division: Ascomycota
- Class: Arthoniomycetes
- Order: Arthoniales
- Family: incertae sedis
- Genus: Bactrospora
- Species: B. angularis

Binomial name
- Bactrospora angularis Sobreira, Aptroot & M.Cáceres (2015)
- Holotype: Brejo dos Cavalos, Brazil

Species of lichen

Bactrospora angularis is a species of corticolous (bark-dwelling), crustose lichen of uncertain familial placement in the order Arthoniales. It is found in Brazil, where it grows on the smooth bark of trees in high-altitude forest regions. It was formally described as a new species in 2015.

== Taxonomy ==
Bactrospora angularis was described as a new species by the lichenologists Priscylla Sobreira, André Aptroot, and Marcela Cáceres. The type specimen was collected in 2013 from Brejo dos Cavalos, located in Caruaru, Pernambuco, Brazil. The lichen grows at an elevation of 877 m (2,877 ft) on tree bark and is associated with a high-altitude forest ecosystem known as Brejo de altitude. The species name, angularis, refers to the irregular shape of the apothecia (fruiting bodies).

== Description ==
The thallus of Bactrospora angularis is crustose (forming a thin crust on its substrate) and has a slightly shiny, greyish-green surface. It adheres closely to the bark and is bordered by a black prothallus line. Covering the thallus are filaments of green algae from the genus Trentepohlia, which may be either symbiotic or epiphytic. These filaments are long, unbranched, and slightly rough, with ellipsoid algal cells embedded within the lichen's structure.

The reproductive structures, or apothecia, are numerous and vary in shape. They are typically irregular, round, or elongated, with a diameter of 0.2–0.5 mm. The apothecial disc is flat and chocolate brown, surrounded by a thin margin of the same colour. The excipulum, the outer layer of the apothecia, is carbonaceous (composed of dark, carbon-like material) and chemically unreactive to iodine and potassium hydroxide tests.

The hymenium, which is the fertile layer where spores are produced, is 200–250 μm tall and contains unbranched paraphyses. Asci (spore-producing sacs) measure 180–200 by 18–26 μm and typically contain eight ascospores each. The ascospores are long and thread-like (filiform), with 19–35 internal partitions (septa). They measure 85–150 by 5–7 μm, are hyaline (transparent), and show some constrictions. No pycnidia (asexual reproductive structures) or secondary chemical compounds were observed in this species.

== Habitat and distribution ==
Bactrospora angularis is known only from Brazil, where it is found on the smooth bark of trees in Brejo de altitude forests. This specialised high-altitude ecosystem provides the humid and shaded conditions favourable for the growth of this lichen. The relationship between the lichen and its associated Trentepohlia algal filaments remains unclear, with the filaments possibly acting as either symbionts or surface epiphytes. In 2022, it was recorded from São Francisco do Sul (Santa Catarina).
