= Lecanactis rubra =

Scientific classification
- Kingdom: Fungi
- Division: Ascomycota
- Class: Arthoniomycetes
- Order: Arthoniales
- Family: Roccellaceae
- Genus: Lecanactis
- Species: L. rubra

Binomial name
- Lecanactis rubra Ertz & Sérus. (2009)

Species of lichen

Lecanactis rubra is a species of corticolous (bark-dwelling), crustose lichen in the family Roccellaceae. Found in Madagascar, it was formally described as a new species in 2009 by Damien Ertz and Emmanuël Sérusiaux. The type specimen was collected by Sérusiaux from the gorge of Manambolo (Mahajanga Province) at an elevation of 300 m (980 ft). At this location, about 3 km (1.9 mi) upstream from Bekopaka, in a dry forest with calcareous soil, it was found growing on bark. This lichen is only known to occur at the type locality.

== Description ==
Lecanactis rubra forms a thin, crust-like film on tree bark. The thallus is pale cream and matt, often cracked into tiny angular islands or puckered into low warts, yet it is only about 50–115 μm thick. Because it lacks a true cortex, the surface is simply a tangle of colourless fungal threads 2–3 μm wide that are dusted with minute crystals which dissolve in potassium hydroxide solution (K). A dark-brown, felt-like prothallus up to 0.4 mm wide sometimes rims the colony. The photosynthetic partner is the orange-green alga Trentepohlia; its cells are roughly 10–17 μm long and sit in loose bundles beneath the fungal layer.

Fruiting bodies (ascomata) rise directly from the thallus as tiny cushions 0.5–1.5 mm across. They are usually rounded but can become lobed, elongated into short slits (lirellae) or, when several fuse, develop a brain-like outline. Each ascoma bears a flat disc that is blanketed by dense white pruina—a frost-like powder that may show an orange tinge. The supporting wall (excipulum) is built from intricately interwoven hyphae and is packed with reddish crystals that turn purple in K, an unusual feature caused by an anthraquinone pigment; the same wall is about 45–50 μm thick at the sides and thickens to 75–100 μm beneath the hymenium. Internally, a clear to orange-tinged hymenium 75–100 μm tall overlies a thin subhymenium that stains blue in iodine. Slender, branched paraphyses thread through the hymenium, whilst eight-spored asci (55–75 × 12–17 μm) show a distinct blue apical ring with iodine staining—an anatomical hallmark of the genus.

The colourless ascospores are spindle-shaped, divided by three transverse walls formed in sequence from the middle outwards, and measure 22.5–27.0 × 5.5–6.0 μm; they remain straight and do not pinch at the septa. Chemical tests reveal gyrophoric acid in both thallus and apothecia (C+ fleeting red) and confirm the presence of the aforementioned anthraquinone (K+ red to purple). Together, the cream ecorticate thallus, white-pruinose red-crystal apothecia, and relatively broad three-septate spores readily separate L. rubra from all other species in the genus.

== Habitat and distribution ==
Lecanactis rubra is known only from its type locality, a dry deciduous forest on limestone in western Madagascar, where it was observed to be locally common at about 300 m elevation. It is one of two Lecanactis species that have been documented from Madagascar; the other is L. spermatospora.
