= Lecanactis leprarica =

Scientific classification
- Domain: Eukaryota
- Kingdom: Fungi
- Division: Ascomycota
- Class: Arthoniomycetes
- Order: Arthoniales
- Family: Roccellaceae
- Genus: Lecanactis
- Species: L. leprarica

Binomial name
- Lecanactis leprarica Kalb & Aptroot (2021)

Species of lichen

Lecanactis leprarica is a species of lichen in the family Roccellaceae. It is found in Cameroon. This lichen forms a thin, pale mint-green crust on tree bark and produces distinctive reproductive bodies that grow into irregularly lobed cushions with chocolate-brown centres surrounded by white, fluffy rims. Described as new to science in 2021, it is distinguished by containing lepraric acid as its main lichen product.

== Taxonomy ==
The lichen was described as a new species in 2021 by the lichenologists Klaus Kalb and André Aptroot. The type was collected near the Bewala Campala village (Eastern Province), at an altitude of about 700 m (2,300 ft). There it was found growing on tree bark in a forest clearing. The specific epithet leprarica refers to its main secondary chemical, lepraric acid.

== Description ==
Lecanactis leprarica forms a thin, continuous crust (thallus) on bark, usually no more than 0.1–0.4 mm thick and often uneven in depth. Its surface is dull and pale mint-green, with occasional whitish frosting (pruina) and a narrow, pale-brown fringe of loose hyphae (the prothallus) up to about 1.2 mm wide that marks the colony margin. The lichen's photosynthetic partner is a Trentepohlia alga, recognised by its orange-green, filamentous cells that sit just beneath the fungal layer.

The reproductive bodies (apothecia) stand directly on the thallus without a stalk. Although they can be neatly round, they more often grow into irregularly lobed cushions 0.4–1.8 mm across. Each apothecium has a low, white, fluffy rim about 0.1 mm wide that rises slightly above the flat, chocolate-brown disc; the disc itself is densely dusted with very pale brown pruina. Internally, a dark-brown epihymenium caps a clear hymenium roughly 125 μm tall. Beneath this, the excipulum is built of interwoven hyphae, while the hypothecium is markedly darker, ranging from deep brown to almost black and reaching 150 μm in height. Club-shaped asci each produce eight colourless ascospores. These spores are slender, three-septate and taper gently at both ends, measuring 18–20 × 2.5–3.0 μm; they lack any surrounding gelatinous sheath. No asexual reproductive structures (pycnidia) have been observed in this species.
