= Lecanactis borbonica =

Scientific classification
- Domain: Eukaryota
- Kingdom: Fungi
- Division: Ascomycota
- Class: Arthoniomycetes
- Order: Arthoniales
- Family: Roccellaceae
- Genus: Lecanactis
- Species: L. borbonica

Binomial name
- Lecanactis borbonica Ertz & Tehler (2011)

Species of lichen

Lecanactis borbonica is a rare species of corticolous (bark-dwelling), lichen in the family Roccellaceae. Found exclusively in Réunion, it forms a crustose thallus and is characterised by its rounded ascomata and the presence of specific chemical compounds.

== Taxonomy ==
The lichen species Lecanactis borbonica was first formally described by lichenologists Damien Ertz and Anders Tehler. The type specimen was collected by the first author from La Réunion, south of Saint-Denis in the Roche Écrite nature reserve, at an altitude between 1,500 and 1,680 m (4,920 and 5,510 ft). The species epithet borbonica refers to the historical name of Réunion, Île Bourbon.

== Description ==
Lecanactis borbonica forms a crustose, white to pale cream thallus, which is 100–240 μm thick. The photobiont is the green algal genus Trentpohlia, with cell sizes ranging from 12 to 20 by 8–11 μm. The prothallus, a dark brown structure, is byssoid and 0.5–2 mm wide. The ascomata are brown, sessile, and rounded, with a diameter of 0.5–1.5 mm.

The thallus of Lecanactis borbonica is chemically characterised by the presence of lecanoric and lepraric acids. These lichen products are useful for distinguishing this species from other related lichens. For example, it can be distinguished from Lecanactis platygraphoides by the presence of lecanoric and lepraric acids, and the absence of schizopeltic acid and an unknown substance.

== Habitat and distribution ==
Lecanactis borbonica has been documented only from its type collection in La Réunion, where it was found growing on bark.
