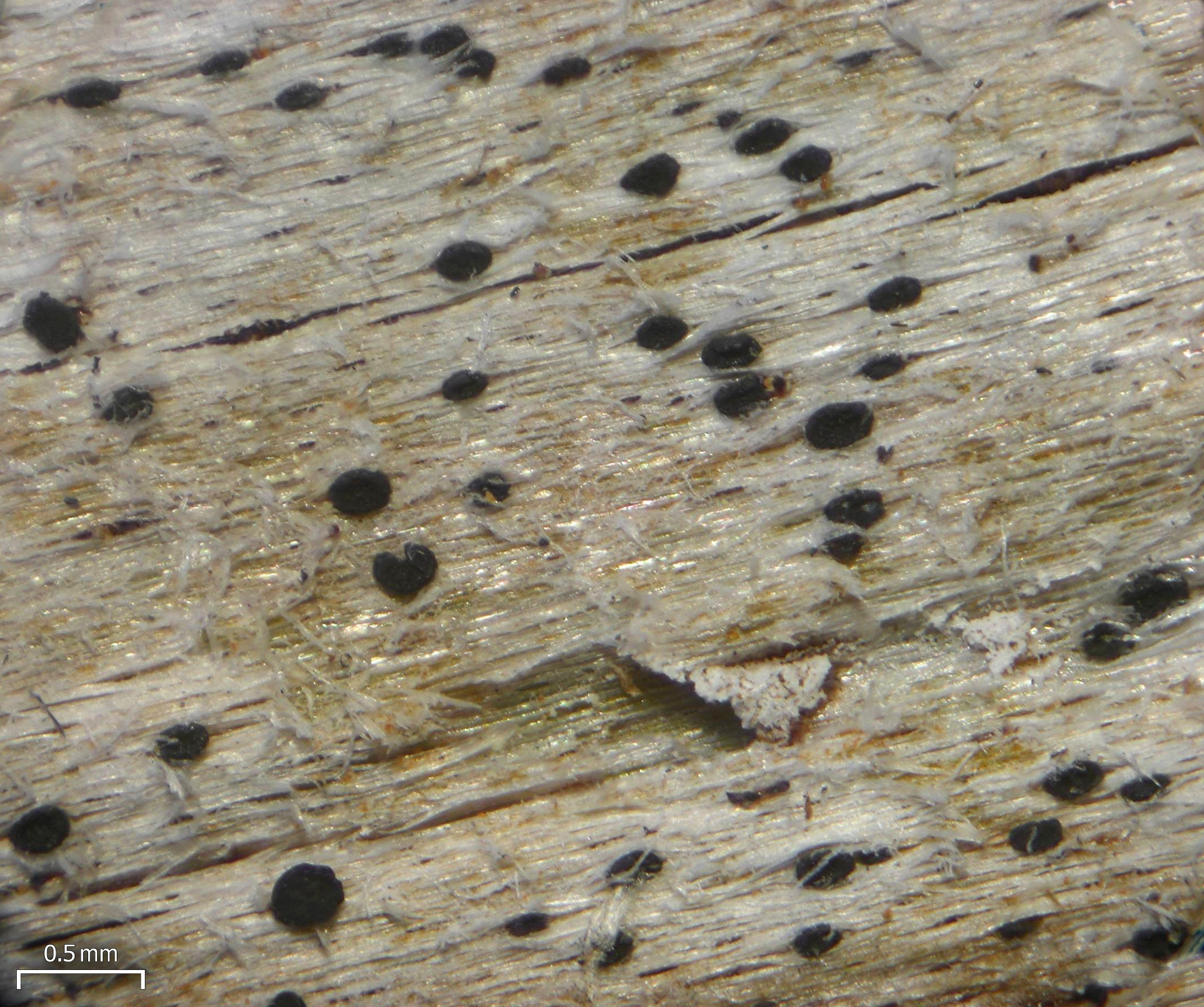
- Bactrospora brevispora

Scientific classification
- Kingdom: Fungi
- Division: Ascomycota
- Class: Arthoniomycetes
- Order: Arthoniales
- Family: incertae sedis
- Genus: Bactrospora; A.Massal. (1852)

Type species
- Bactrospora dryina (Ach.) A.Massal. (1852)

Synonyms
- Bactrosporomyces Cif. & Tomas. (1953); Melampydiomyces Cif. & Tomas. (1953); Melampylidium Stirt. ex Müll.Arg. (1894); Scolecactis Clem. (1909)

= Bactrospora =

Genus of lichen-forming fungi

Bactrospora is a genus of lichen-forming fungi of uncertain familial placement in the order Arthoniales. These lichens grow as thin crusts on tree bark in shaded, humid environments and are distinguished by their unusually long, needle-like spores that often break apart into smaller pieces. Species in the genus are found worldwide, particularly in tropical and temperate forests where they help form part of the diverse bark-dwelling (corticolous) lichen community.

== Taxonomy ==
The genus was circumscribed by the Italian paleobotanist and lichenologist Abramo Bartolommeo Massalongo in 1852. Massalongo distinguished Bactrospora primarily by its distinctive spore characteristics: rod-shaped spores that divide into two-celled, elliptical segments—combined with polysporous asci containing 18–20 spores. He established B. dryina as the type species based on material collected from Germany.

== Description ==
Bactrospora forms a thin, crust-like thallus that either sits on the bark surface or sinks slightly into it. The crust is usually continuous and even, though older colonies may crack into an irregular mosaic, and its surface can appear scurfy or powdery. Because a true cortex—the protective outer skin found in many lichens—is missing, the fungal layer merges directly with the algal partner. The photobiont is the orange-tinged green alga Trentepohlia, whose cells become visible and stain the thallus orange when the surface is gently scratched. A prothallus (an outer fringe of pure fungal tissue) is poorly developed and often escapes notice. No characteristic lichen products have been detected with thin-layer chromatography.

The fruit bodies of Bactrospora are tiny, black to black-brown discs (apothecia) that sit on the thallus without a rim of surrounding tissue (a thalline margin). Their own wall, the exciple, stays conspicuous; it is dark red-brown at the edge but becomes paler further in, and a drop of potassium hydroxide solution (KOH) turns this pigment an olive-black. Internally, the clear (hyaline) hymenium contains stout, sparsely branched paraphysoids whose tips interlink to form a cap (epithecium) ranging from pale to dark red-brown. Each ascus follows the Opegrapha-type fissitunicate pattern: its wall splits apart when the spores are released, and an iodine staining may reveal a faint blue dome over the tiny ocular chamber at the apex.

Ascospores are elongated, thin and needle-like, divided by dozens of internal walls. Mature spores frequently break up into smaller spherical or short-cylindrical part-spores, so older asci often appear to contain many more than the original eight. Asexual reproduction occurs in flask-shaped pycnidia embedded in the thallus; these produce colourless, rod-shaped conidia that escape through a dark-brown pore whose pigment also turns green-black in KOH. Bactrospora is usually corticolous, colonising the bark of trees in shaded, humid habitats, and can be told apart from related genera such as Lecanactis and Cresponea by its extremely multiseptate, fragmentation-prone spores.

== Species ==
As of June 2025, Species Fungorum (in the Catalogue of Life) accepts 24 species of Bactrospora.

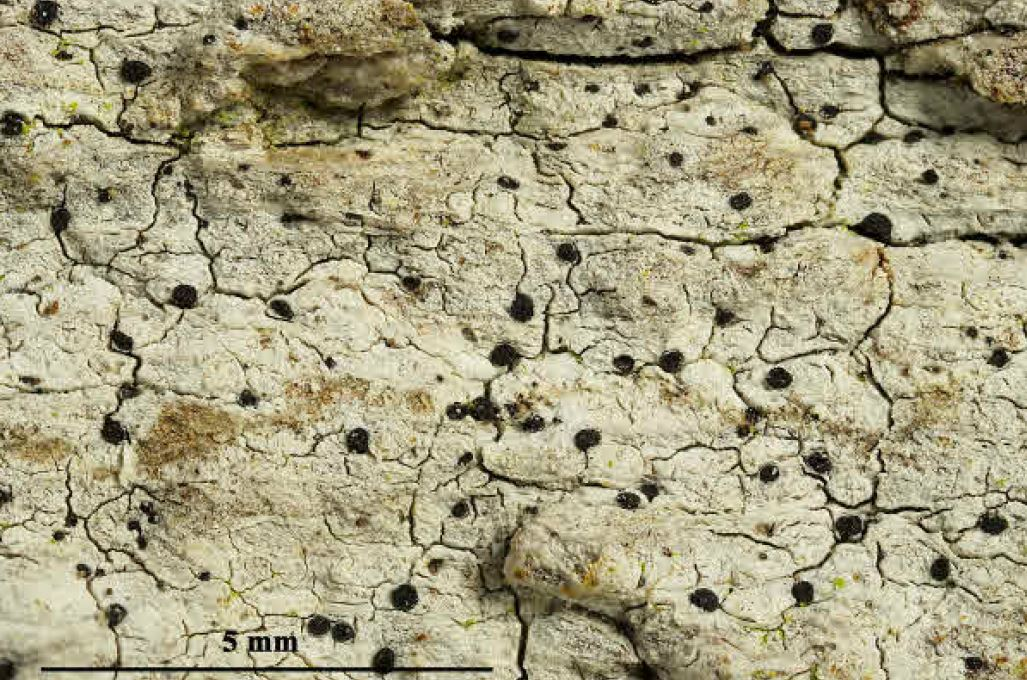
Bactrospora dryina

- Bactrospora angularis Sobreira, Aptroot & M.Cáceres (2015)
- Bactrospora arthonioides Egea & Torrente (1993)
- Bactrospora brevispora R.C.Harris (1990)
- Bactrospora brodoi Egea & Torrente (1993)
- Bactrospora carneopallida Egea & Torrente (1993)
- Bactrospora carolinensis (Ellis & Everh.) R.C.Harris (2011)
- Bactrospora cascadensis Ponzetti & McCune (2006)
- Bactrospora corticola (Fr.) Almq. (1869)
- Bactrospora cozumelensis Y.García-Mart., Guzmán-Guillermo, R.Valenz. & Raymundo (2021) – Quintana Roo
- Bactrospora dryina (Ach.) A.Massal. (1852)
- Bactrospora flavopruinosa F.Berger & Aptroot (2008)
- Bactrospora granularis Kantvilas (2004)
- Bactrospora homalotropa (Nyl.) Egea & Torrente (1989)
- Bactrospora inspersa Aptroot (2007)
- Bactrospora intermedia Egea & Torrente (1993)
- Bactrospora jaceae Velen. (1940)
- Bactrospora lamprospora (Nyl.) Lendemer (2004)
- Bactrospora lecanorina Herrera-Camp., Altamirano & Lücking (2019)
- Bactrospora littoralis Jagad.Ram (2014)
- Bactrospora mangrovei Devadatha & V.V.Sarma (2023) – India
- Bactrospora medians Jagad.Ram (2014)
- Bactrospora mesospora R.C.Harris (1990)
- Bactrospora metabola (Nyl.) Egea & Torrente (1995)
- Bactrospora micareoides Kantvilas (2004)
- Bactrospora namibiensis Egea, Sérus., Torrente & Wessels (1997) – Namibia
- Bactrospora nematospora R.C.Harris (1990)
- Bactrospora ochracea Ertz & van den Boom (2018)
- Bactrospora paludicola Kantvilas (2004)
- Bactrospora perspiralis Sparrius, Saipunk. & Wolseley (2006)
- Bactrospora spiralis Egea & Torrente (1993)
- Bactrospora subdryina Sparrius, Saipunk. & Wolseley (2006)
- Bactrospora thyrsodes (Stirt.) Llop & van den Boom (2009)
- Bactrospora totonacae Guzmán-Guillermo, Sorcia-Navarrete & Cárdenas-Mendoza (2021)
