= Schismatomma leucopsarum =

Conservation status
- Critically Endangered (IUCN 3.1)

Scientific classification
- Kingdom: Fungi
- Division: Ascomycota
- Class: Arthoniomycetes
- Order: Arthoniales
- Family: Roccellaceae
- Genus: Schismatomma
- Species: S. leucopsarum

Binomial name
- Schismatomma leucopsarum (Nyl.) Zahlbr. (1923)

Synonyms
- List: Platygrapha leucopsara Nyl. (1863); Lecanora undulata Fée (1825); Parmelia undulata (Fée) Mont. (1841); Platygrapha undulata (Fée) Nyl. (1858); Haematomma undulatum (Fée) A.Massal. (1860); Platygrapha leucopsara Nyl. (1863); Crocynia undulata (Fée) Hue (1909); Schismatomma undulatum (Fée) Zahlbr. (1923); Byssophoropsis undulata (Fée) Tehler (1993)

Species of lichen

Schismatomma leucopsarum is a species of corticolous (bark-dwelling) crustose lichen in the family Roccellaceae. Found in Colombia, it has been assessed as Critically Endangered for the IUCN red list of endangered species.

== Taxonomy ==
The species was originally described by the Finnish lichenologist William Nylander in 1863. Alexander Zahlbruckner transferred it to the genus Schismatomma in 1923.

== Description ==
Schismatomma leucopsarum is an epiphytic (plant-dwelling) crustose lichen that strongly adheres to its substrate. It has a whitish to cream-coloured surface with rounded apothecia (fruiting bodies). The apothecia have black discs bordered by a thalline margin that is the same colour as the thallus. The hymenium (spore-producing layer) is hemiamyloid.

== Distribution and habitat ==
Schismatomma leucopsarum is known only from a single record in the municipality of Honda, in the Cundinamarca Department of Colombia. It grows as an epiphyte on trees and shrubs in tropical dry forests or tropical rainforests, at an elevation of about 250 metres above sea level.

== Conservation ==
The International Union for Conservation of Nature (IUCN) has assessed S. leucopsarum as Critically Endangered (CR) due to its extremely limited known distribution. The species has an estimated area of occupancy of only 4 km² and is known from a single location. The main threats to its habitat include logging and the construction and operation of hydrocarbon transportation infrastructure, such as gas pipelines. Despite recent surveys in areas with similar characteristics, the species has not been found again since its initial collection by Alejandro Lindig. S. leucopsarum is protected under Resolution 0213 of 1977 in Colombia, which prohibits its use and commercialisation.
