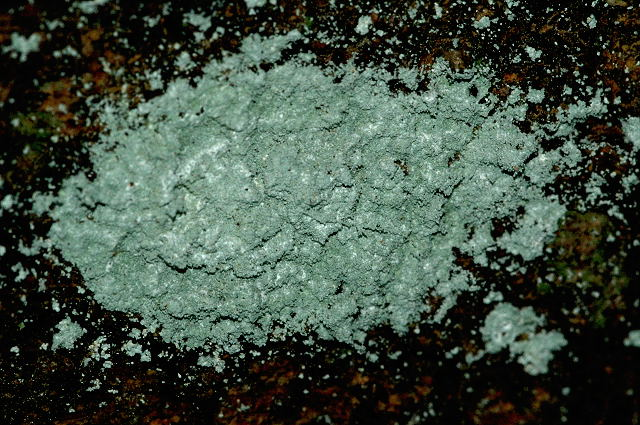
- Lecanactis abietina

Scientific classification
- Kingdom: Fungi
- Division: Ascomycota
- Class: Arthoniomycetes
- Order: Arthoniales
- Family: Roccellaceae
- Genus: Lecanactis; Körb. (1855)

Type species
- Lecanactis abietina (Ach.) Körb. (1855)

Synonyms
- Pyrenotea Fr. (1821); Schismatomma Flot. & Körb. ex A.Massal. (1852); Sagenidium Stirt. (1877); Lecanactis subgen. Arthoniactis Vain. (1901); Arthoniactis (Vain.) Clem. (1909); Bacidiactis M.Choisy (1931); Lecanactiomyces Cif. & Tomas. (1953)

= Lecanactis =

Genus of lichen-forming fungi

Lecanactis is a genus of crustose lichens, commonly called old wood lichens. The mycobiont (fungus partner) is in the family Roccellaceae. The photobiont is an algae in the genus Trentepohlia. These lichens typically grow as thin crusts on tree bark or rocks, producing small black fruiting bodies that may appear as round discs or elongated slits. The genus contains about 40 species found worldwide, with some species considered rare and threatened by habitat loss.

== Taxonomy ==
The genus was circumscribed in 1855 by the German lichenologist Gustav Wilhelm Körber, who assigned Lecanactis abietina as the type species. In his original description, Körber characterised Lecanactis as having pseudolecideine apothecia (fruiting bodies) that are initially closed, then become widely open, with a rounded to somewhat irregular form. He noted that the apothecia typically have a prominent carbonized margin and distinguished the genus by its spore-bearing structures and thallus characteristics.

Körber initially included several species in the genus, including L. abietina, L. dilleniana, and L. biformis. He recognised Lecanactis as a transitional genus that connects the graphidioid lichens with the lecideine forms, noting the unique combination of initially closed apothecia that later expand and the distinctive thalline characteristics that separate it from related genera such as Opegrapha. The genus name Lecanactis reflects the lecanorine-like appearance of the apothecia combined with their distinctive radiating or star-like (actis) arrangement when mature.

A later nomenclatural review showed that the name Lecanactis had a complicated early history. Although the genus came into general use in the sense adopted by Körber in 1855, Anders Tehler pointed out that the name had earlier been used by Franz Gerhard Eschweiler in a different sense. To preserve the long-established usage of Lecanactis for the genus as understood by lichenologists, Tehler proposed conserving the name with Lecanactis abietina as its conserved type, rather than allowing it to be displaced by little-used alternatives such as Scolecactis or Lecanactiomyces. In 1988, the Committee for Fungi and Lichens recommended adoption of Lecanactis in Körber's sense, with L. abietina as type, over the earlier homonym published by Eschweiler, concluding that failure to conserve the name would greatly upset lichen nomenclature.

In the broad concept used by Alexander Zahlbruckner in the early 20th century, Lecanactis had become a heterogeneous assemblage containing about 140 species and numerous infraspecific taxa (forms, varieties, and subspecies). During the 1990s, that circumscription was narrowed as several segregate genera, including Cresponea, Lecanographa and Sipmania, were removed from Lecanactis, Catarraphia was reinstated, many species were transferred to Bactrospora, and eight former Schismatomma species were moved into Lecanactis. In a 1997 cladistic study based on morphological, anatomical and chemical characters, Tehler and José Egea recovered Lecanactis sensu stricto as a monophyletic group, but found that relationships within the genus were only weakly supported, so they did not propose any subgeneric classification.

== Description ==
Lecanactis species produce a thin, crust-forming thallus that adheres tightly to bark or rock. The surface may appear smooth, scurfy, cracked into irregular plates, or even minutely warted; a few species develop a powdery, leprose texture. Some thalli spread without a clear edge, while others are neatly outlined by a dark brown to black marginal line called a hypothallus. Unlike many lichens, the outer skin (cortex) is either rudimentary or absent, leaving the internal fungal tissue exposed. The photosynthetic partner is always a filamentous green alga from the genus Trentepohlia, whose orange-tinged cells often tint the lichen faintly when viewed through a hand lens.

Reproduction takes place in small fruiting bodies called apothecia, which can be round discs or elongate, pencil-like slits (lirellae) that sit directly on the thallus surface. They are usually black but are often dusted with a pale, chalky bloom (pruina). Because the surrounding thallus tissue does not form a border, the apothecia are rimmed only by the fungal exciple—a dark, usually raised wall that can also pick up a pruinose coating. In microscopic section the exciple and underlying tissue are deep brown, and their pigments turn green when a drop of potassium hydroxide solution (the K test) is applied. Inside each apothecium the hymenium—the fertile layer—is either iodine-negative or briefly stains reddish to blue. Slender, sparsely branched paraphyses stand among the asci, each paraphysis swelling slightly at its tip.

Every ascus typically contains eight colourless, spindle-shaped ascospores that are divided by three to seven (occasionally eight) internal wall (septa); the walls stay thin and do not bulge at the septa. Separate flask-shaped structures (pycnidia) erupt as conspicuous, white-dusty cylinders and release minute, rod-like conidia that provide an additional means of dispersal. Chemically the genus is marked by the presence of orcinol-type depsides and β-orcinol depsidones, along with erythrin and several lesser-known substances.

== Conservation ==
Lecanactis proximans was assessed as critically endangered in 2023 for the IUCN Red List. The lichen is known from a single location in the Cerros Orientales (Eastern Hills) of Bogotá, where it is threatened by habitat alteration and deforestation due to urban expansion, industrial development, and agricultural encroachment. The species has not been rediscovered in surveys of remnant forest patches in the area.

== Species ==
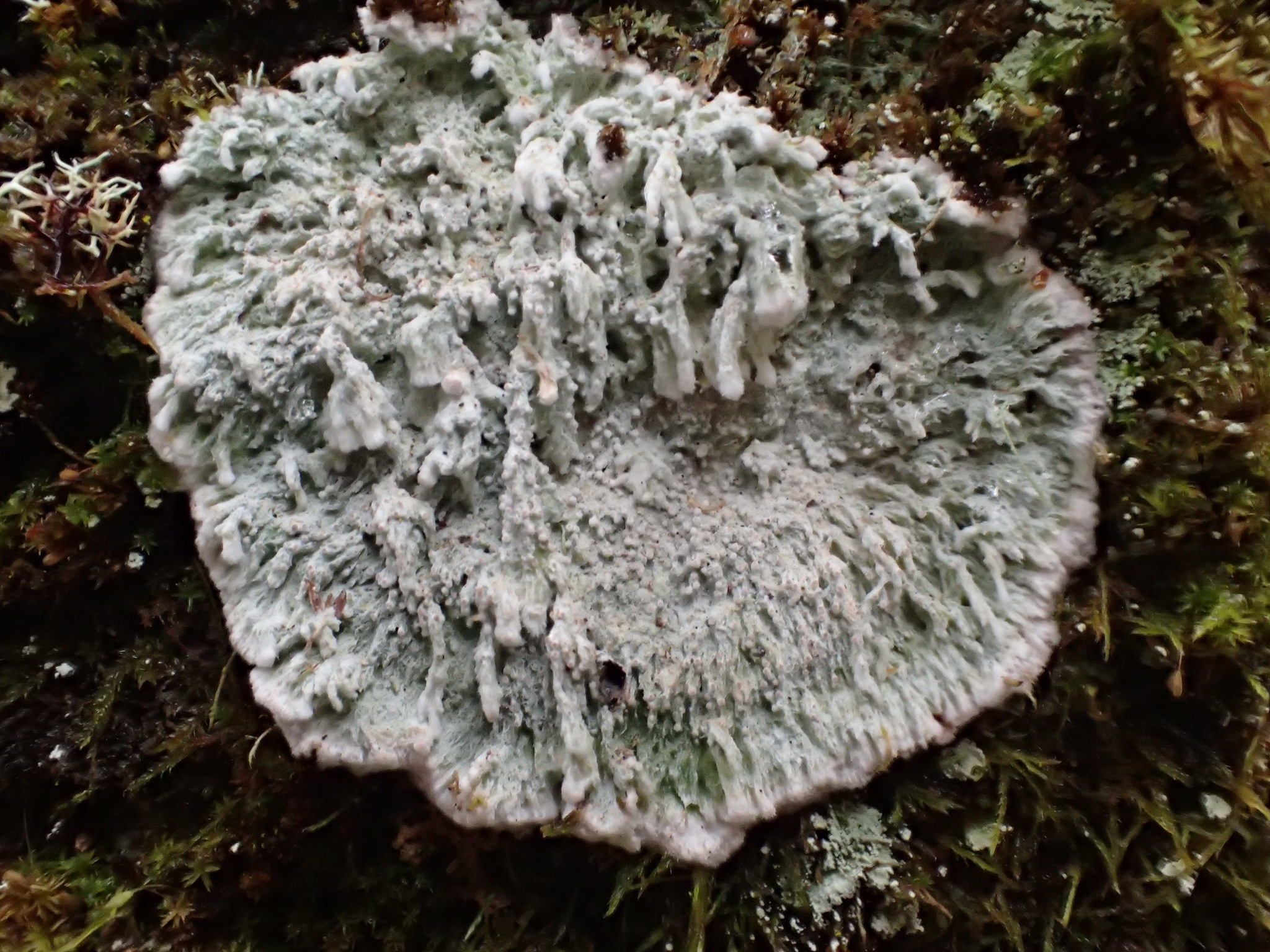
Lecanactis mollis

As of April 2026, species Fungorum (in the Catalogue of Life) include 39 species of Lecanactis.

- Lecanactis abietina (Ach.) Körb. (1855)
- Lecanactis albida Groenh. (1954)
- Lecanactis americana Vain. (1890)
- Lecanactis arenae Flagey (1896)
- Lecanactis biformata H.Olivier (1911)
- Lecanactis borbonica Ertz & Tehler (2011)
- Lecanactis bullata Zahlbr. (1932)
- Lecanactis californica Tuck. (1888)
- Lecanactis canariensis van den Boom & Etayo (2006)
- Lecanactis citrina (Follmann) Frisch & Ertz (2014)
- Lecanactis coniochlora (Mont. & Bosch) Zahlbr. (1923)
- Lecanactis deightonii C.W.Dodge (1953)
- Lecanactis develans Nyl. (1890)
- Lecanactis dubia G.Merr. (1923)
- Lecanactis endorhoda Zahlbr. (1928)
- Lecanactis exigua Egea & Torrente (1994)
- Lecanactis flexans Nyl. (1891)
- Lecanactis kerguelensis C.W.Dodge (1948)
- Lecanactis lactescens Zahlbr. (1909)
- Lecanactis latispora Egea & Torrente (1994)
- Lecanactis lecanoroides Mont. & Bosch (1856)
- Lecanactis lecideina Eitner (1911)
- Lecanactis leprarica Kalb & Aptroot (2021) – Cameroon
- Lecanactis limosescens Zahlbr. (1933)
- Lecanactis lividula Vain. (1926)
- Lecanactis luteola (Follmann) Ertz & Tehler (2011)
- Lecanactis lyncea (Sm.) Fr. (1831)
- Lecanactis macrocarpa Zahlbr. (1927)
- Lecanactis malmideoides Kalb & Aptroot (2018) – South America
- Lecanactis mawsonii C.W.Dodge (1948)
- Lecanactis minuta Ertz, Flakus & Kukwa (2015)
- Lecanactis minutissima Weerakoon & Aptroot (2016)
- Lecanactis mollis (Stirt.) Frisch & Ertz (2014)
- Lecanactis nakajii Vain. & Yasuda (1921)
- Lecanactis neozelandica Egea & Torrente (1994)
- Lecanactis neozelandica Egea & Torrente (1994)
- Lecanactis olivascens Egea, Sérus. & Torrente (1996)
- Lecanactis pallens Zahlbr. (1941)
- Lecanactis platygraphoides (Müll.Arg.) Zahlbr. (1923)
- Lecanactis proximans (Nyl.) Zahlbr. (1923)
- Lecanactis quassiae (Fée) Zahlbr. (1923)
- Lecanactis ramosus B.de Lesd. (1952)
- Lecanactis redingeri Zahlbr. (1941)
- Lecanactis rockii Zahlbr. (1912)
- Lecanactis rubra Ertz & Sérus. (2009) – Madagascar
- Lecanactis salicina Zahlbr. (1906)
- Lecanactis saltelii B.de Lesd. (1907)
- Lecanactis scopulicola Kantvilas (2021)
- Lecanactis scotommodes Vain. (1921)
- Lecanactis serograpta (Spreng.) Mont. (1842)
- Lecanactis serpentinicola Räsänen (1946)
- Lecanactis spermatospora Egea & Torrente (1994)
- Lecanactis sphaerobola Lettau (1932)
- Lecanactis stellaris Egea & Aptroot (1992)
- Lecanactis subdilleniana S.Y.Kondr., Lőkös & Hur (2015)
- Lecanactis subfarinosa (C.Knight) Hellb. (1896)
- Lecanactis submollis Ertz, Eb.Fisch., Killmann, Sérus. & Frisch (2014)
- Lecanactis submorosa Zahlbr. (1933)
- Lecanactis sulphurea Egea & Torrente (1994)
- Lecanactis takalae Räsänen (1949)
- Lecanactis tibelliana Egea & Torrente (1994)
- Lecanactis xanthococcoides Vain. (1928)
- Lecanactis zahlbruckneri Herre (1907)
