= Schismatomma =

Scientific classification
- Domain: Eukaryota
- Kingdom: Fungi
- Division: Ascomycota
- Class: Arthoniomycetes
- Order: Arthoniales
- Family: Roccellaceae
- Genus: Schismatomma; Flot. & Körb. ex A.Massal. (1852)

Type species
- Schismatomma dolosum Flot. & Körb. ex A.Massal. (1852)

Genus of lichen-forming fungi

Schismatomma is a genus of mostly lichen-forming fungi in the family Roccellaceae. These lichens form thin crusts on bark or rock surfaces and reproduce through disc-shaped fruiting bodies that release spores, as well as through powdery patches that help them spread. At least one species is critically endangered due to habitat loss from deforestation in Colombia.

== Description ==
Schismatomma species form a thin, crust-like thallus that lies more or less flush with the bark or rock surface. Where colonies meet they may be separated by a dark brown to black fringe (the prothallus), and some species develop powdery reproductive patches called soralia that can mask the underlying crust. A quick scratch of fresh material exposes an orange stain—pigment from the filamentous alga Trentepohlia, which supplies the photosynthetic partner in every species. Because the crust lacks a true outer skin (cortex) the algal layer sits immediately beneath the fungal tissue.

Sexual fruit bodies (apothecia) start embedded in the thallus but often emerge to become small, slightly irregular discs. Each is ringed by a rim of thallus tissue (thalline margin), while the fruit body's own wall (true exciple) remains poorly developed and soon blends into the surrounding crust. Internally, the spore-bearing layer (hymenium) stains blue in iodine and is threaded by branched, interwoven filaments (paraphysoids). Beneath lies a dark olive to black hypothecium that may be scarcely visible in thin specimens. The asci are club-shaped and split open (fissitunicate) to release eight spindle-shaped to gently curved ascospores, each divided by several cross-walls; the spores are colourless when young, may brown slightly with age, and can coil inside the ascus before discharge.

Asexual propagation occurs in flask-shaped pycnidia sunk within the thallus. Their lining cells bud off minute, rod-shaped conidia—straight, curved, or kidney-shaped—that escape through a tiny pore and disperse independently of the alga. Chemical analysis shows wide variation: different species may contain orcinol-type depsides such as lecanoric acid or erythrin, β-orcinol compounds like fumarprotocetraric or psoromic acids, yellow chromones, fatty acids, or remain chemically undetected. Morphologically the genus resembles Enterographa and Lecanactis, but it is set apart by the presence of a thalline margin around the apothecia and a much reduced exciple.

== Conservation ==
Schismatomma leucopsarum was assessed as a Critically Endangered species in 2023 for the IUCN Red List. The lichen is known from only a single location in the municipality of Honda, Cundinamarca Department, where it is threatened by deforestation for timber extraction and expansion of industrial areas. Despite surveys in similar habitats, the species has not been rediscovered since its initial collection.

== Species ==
As of June 2025, Species Fungorum (in the Catalogue of Life) accepts seven species of Schismatomma, although many more taxa than this have been named as members of the genus.

- Schismatomma dolosum (Duby) Flot. & Körb. ex A.Massal. (1852)
- Schismatomma glaucescens (Nyl. ex Fink) R.C.Harris (1990)
- Schismatomma graphidioides (Leight. ex Lettau) Zahlbr. (1919)
- Schismatomma insulae-howense (Sparrius) Tehler & Ertz (2013)
- Schismatomma leucopsarum (Nyl.) Zahlbr. (1923)
- Schismatomma occultum (C.Knight & Mitt.) Zahlbr. (1923)
- Schismatomma physconiicola Ertz & Diederich (2006)
- Schismatomma umbrinum (Coppins & P.James) P.M.Jørg. & Tønsberg (1988)
