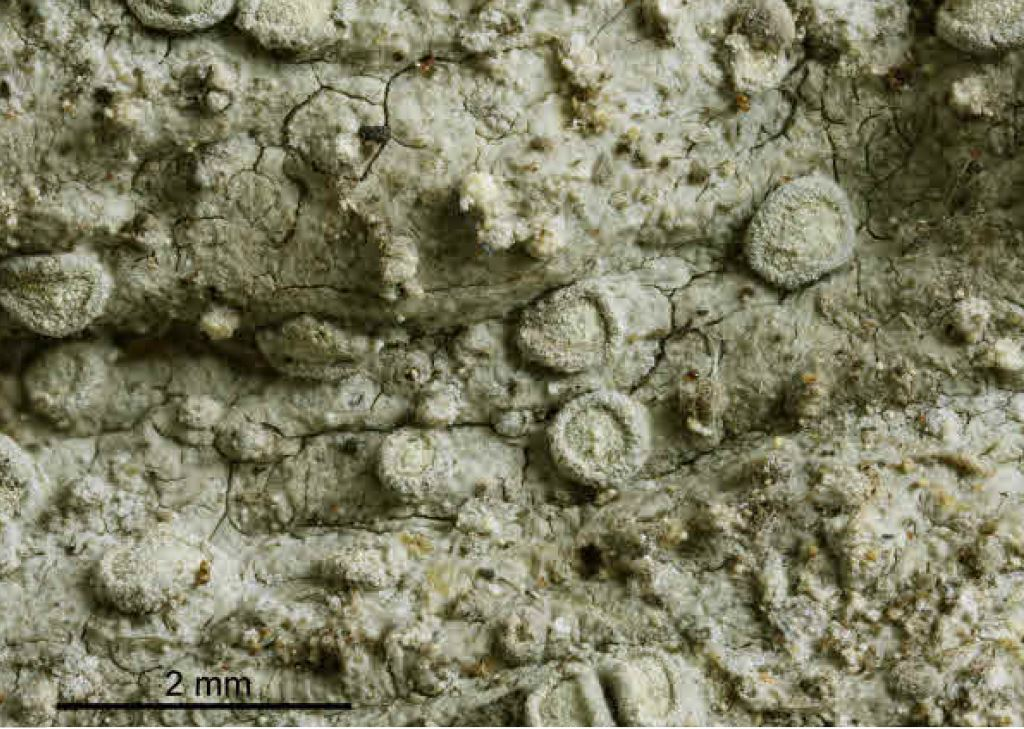

Conservation status
- Apparently Secure (NatureServe)

Scientific classification
- Kingdom: Fungi
- Division: Ascomycota
- Class: Arthoniomycetes
- Order: Arthoniales
- Family: Roccellaceae
- Genus: Lecanactis
- Species: L. abietina

Binomial name
- Lecanactis abietina (Ehrh. ex Ach.) Körb. (1855)

Synonyms
- List: Lichen abietinus Ehrh. ex Ach. (1795); Lecidea abietina (Ehrh. ex Ach.) Ach. (1803); Lichen peltatus * abietina (Ehrh. ex Ach.) Lam. (1813); Cyphelium abietinum (Ehrh. ex Ach.) Fr. (1824); Schismatomma abietinum (Ehrh. ex Ach.) A.Massal. (1852); Biatora abietina (Ehrh. ex Ach.) Nägeli ex Hepp (1853); Bilimbia abietina (Ehrh. ex Ach.) Branth & Rostr. (1869); Opegrapha abietina (Ehrh. ex Ach.) Almq. (1869); Verrucaria leucocephala Ach. (1803); Pyrenula leucocephala (Ach.) Ach. (1814); Variolaria leucocephala (Ach.) DC. (1815); Cyphelium leucocephalum (Ach.) Ach. (1817); Pyrenotea leucocephala (Ach.) Fr. (1821); Calicium variolosum * leucocephalum (Ach.) Wahlenb. (1826); Lecidea leucocephala (Ach.) D.Dietr. (1846); Cyphelium incrustans Ach. (1817); Pyrenotea incrustans (Ach.) Fr. (1821); Verrucaria incrustans (Ach.) Steud. & Hochst. (1826); Pyrenotea leucocephala var. incrustans (Ach.) Fr. (1831); Lecidea abietina var. incrustans (Ach.) Nyl. (1855); Lecidea abietina f. incrustans (Ach.) Nyl. (1861); Lecanactis abietina f. incrustans (Ach.) H.Olivier (1900); Bilimbia abietina f. incrustans (Ach.) Boistel (1903); Lecanactis premnea var. incrustans (Ach.) H.Olivier (1911); Schismatomma abietinum f. incrustans (Ach.) Zahlbr. (1924); Phoma abietinae Linds. (1872); Schismatommatomyces abietini Cif. & Tomas. (1953); Lecanactiomyces abietinae Cif. & Tomas. (1954)

= Lecanactis abietina =

Species of lichen-forming fungus

Lecanactis abietina, the old-wood lichen, is a species of leprose lichen in the family Roccellaceae. It forms a thin, mauve-grey to whitish-grey crust on the bark of both deciduous and coniferous trees, typically in shaded, humid habitats, and is regarded as characteristic of old-growth forests in cool temperate regions. The species is widespread in northern and central Europe and also occurs in North America, Australasia, and Papua New Guinea. Its nomenclatural history played a central role in the conservation of the genus Lecanactis, for which it serves as the type species.

== Taxonomy ==
In his 1855 treatment of the genus, Gustav Wilhelm Körber presented Lecanactis as a transitional group linking more graphid-like lichens with more lecideoid forms. He described it as having a crustose thallus and usually immersed apothecia that were at first open and mostly rounded, although some could later become more elongated. Körber also distinguished Lecanactis from the closely related Opegrapha by its rounder fruiting bodies, thinner margin, and colourless spores, which he described as sharper at the ends and more needle- or spindle-shaped. Within this framework, Körber treated the species in 1855 as Lecanactis abietina, describing it as a thin, spreading, leprose lichen with a whitish to bluish-grey thallus, sessile apothecia that soon became angular, and hyaline spores. He also listed several earlier names in synonymy, showing that the species had already been known under other generic placements before he accepted it in Lecanactis. That history explains the authority (Ehrh. ex Ach.) Körb.: the species was originally named by Ehrhart, with the name validly published by Acharius, and was later transferred to the genus Lecanactis by Körber. In North America, it is commonly known as the "old-wood lichen".

The nomenclatural history of Lecanactis abietina is tied to a long-standing problem over the name of the genus Lecanactis. In 1986, Anders Tehler noted that the name had been used in two different senses: the original concept published by Eschweiler in 1824, and the later, much more familiar usage established by Körber in 1855. Tehler argued that modern lichenologists had consistently used Lecanactis in Körber's sense, and that this later usage included L. abietina among its core species.

Because of this history, Tehler proposed that Lecanactis be formally conserved with Lecanactis abietina as its conserved type species. He argued that this would preserve long-standing usage and avoid replacing the well-known genus name with little-used alternatives such as Scolecactis or Lecanactiomyces. In this way, L. abietina became central to efforts to stabilise the nomenclature of the genus.

In a 1997 phylogenetic study, Lecanactis was supported as a natural, single lineage, and L. abietina fell within a recurring species group that also included L. flaviseda, L. flavisedella, L. epileuca, L. inferior, L. elaeocarpa, and L. olivascens, although the relationships within the genus were only weakly supported.

== Description ==
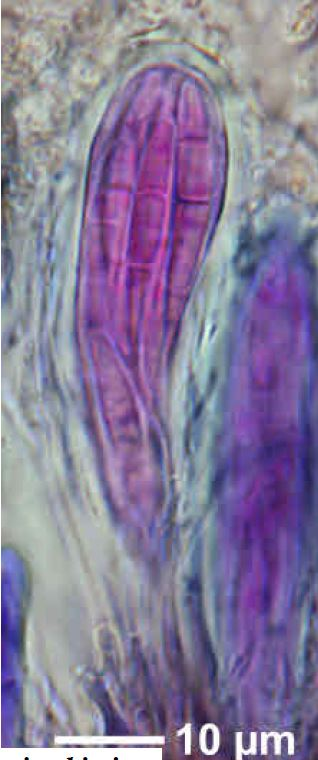
Microscopy of a stained ascus containing 3-septate ascospores

Lecanactis abietina forms a thin, effuse (spreading) thallus that is mauve-grey to whitish grey. Sexual fruiting bodies (apothecia) are not always present. When they occur they are circular, 0.7–2 mm across, and sit on or are closely pressed to the surface (sessile to appressed). The brown-black disc is thickly dusted with a yellow-grey, frost-like bloom (pruina) and is bordered by a prominent, persistent rim of fungal tissue (a true exciple). Ascospores are slender—spindle- to needle-shaped, usually slightly curved—and have 3 (occasionally 4) internal cross-walls, measuring 28–40 × 3–6 μm.

Asexual structures (pycnidia) are numerous and evenly scattered as tiny, cylindrical, knob-like dots 0.2–0.3 mm in diameter with white-pruinose tips. Their walls are 25–50 μm thick, dark brown in water and turning green-black with potassium hydroxide solution (the K test). The spore-producing cells inside (conidiogenous cells) are 8–12 × 1.9–2.4 μm and release cylindrical conidia 12–17 × 2–3 μm. In standard spot tests, the pycnidial pruina reacts C+ (red), but is K−. The apothecial pruina and thallus are C−, K−, KC− and Pd−, yet show a bright blue fluorescence after K followed by ultraviolet (K/UV+). The inner tissue (medulla) fluoresces yellow to glaucous grey under long-wave UV, reflecting the presence of lecanoric and schizopeltic acids along with other UV-reactive substances. Among the corticolous (bark-dwelling) species of the genus, Lecanactis abietina is distinguished by the combination of schizopeltic acid in the thallus, conspicuous cylindrical pycnidia with C+ (red) apices, and relatively long, narrow, 3-septate ascospores. These features separate it from L. latispora and L. neozelandica, which have shorter, broader ascospores and immersed pycnidia.

== Habitat and distribution ==
Lecanactis abietina grows on both deciduous and coniferous trees, typically in shaded, humid habitats, and is characteristic of old trees and old forests in cool temperate regions. In Norway it behaves as a mainly coastal, suboceanic species, being especially frequent in humid coastal spruce forests. Although it often grows on the shaded bases of mature spruce trunks, it also commonly occurs on mossy rock beneath overhangs, where it forms a more cushion-like thallus than it does on bark. It has been recorded on decorticate (barkless) stumps and on sheltered wood, and more occasionally on birch. More rarely it occurs on alder, hazel, pine, and oak, although in southern Scandinavia and England it has mainly been found on oak. In Tasmania, it occurs most often on the dry, flaky bark of mature Nothofagus cunninghamii in cool temperate rainforest, where it grows alongside Lecanactis mollis and a diverse assemblage of crustose lichens, including calicioid taxa. In lowland eastern and east-central Europe, L. abietina is associated with older forests that have remained continuously wooded for long periods. Within that region it is concentrated in maritime areas but becomes more scattered inland, where it is even more closely confined to old-growth stands.

The species is widespread in northern and central Europe, and in North America it has been reported from British Columbia, Quebec, and New Brunswick in Canada, as well as the northern and north-western United States. It is also known from the Southern Hemisphere, including Australia, Tasmania, New Zealand, and Papua New Guinea.
