= Dirina mexicana =

Scientific classification
- Domain: Eukaryota
- Kingdom: Fungi
- Division: Ascomycota
- Class: Arthoniomycetes
- Order: Arthoniales
- Family: Roccellaceae
- Genus: Dirina
- Species: D. mexicana

Binomial name
- Dirina mexicana Tehler (1995)

Species of lichen

Dirina mexicana is a species of saxicolous (rock-dwelling), crustose lichen in the family Roccellaceae. First identified in Mexico, it displays distinctive characteristics which set it apart from other species within the same genus. The lichen is unique for its varied hues and certain chemical characteristics that are seen in its thallus, or vegetative tissue. Typically growing on vertical or overhanging rocks and cliffs, Dirina mexicana can be found in specific regions across Mexico.

== Taxonomy ==
The species was formally described by Swedish lichenologist Anders Tehler in 1995. It is included within the genus Dirina and shares some common characteristics with other species in the genus, such as D. insulana, D. immersa, and D. cretacea. However, it stands out due to its unique colouration and chemical composition. The type specimen of Dirina mexicana was found 3 km (1.9 miles) north-northeast of Higuera de Zaragoza in the state of Sinaloa, Mexico, on a hill surrounded by agricultural fields.

== Description ==
Dirina mexicana is a strictly saxicolous lichen that grows exclusively on acidic rock formations. Its thallus is crustose, somewhat bullate (having bubble-like surface swellings) and typically 0.2–0.5 mm thick. Its surface is plane to slightly rough to slightly warted (rugose to verruculose) and can appear white to white-greyish to white-yellowish in colour.

The lichen's ascomata, or fruiting bodies, are immersed in the thallus and have a diameter of 0.4–0.8 mm. The disc is white, has a coating of pruina, and a surface covered by cracks termed rimulae. The ascospores made by the lichen are fusiform and hyaline, typically measuring 21–27 by 5–6 μm.

In chemical spot tests, the thallus surface of Dirina mexicana turns red only in the rimulae; elsewhere, it appears faintly red or does not change colour (C−). The lichen contains erythrin as a major compound along with an unidentified substance, probably a depsidone. Traces of orsellinic and lecanoric acids are also present. The lichen also contains two unidentified substances not found in similar quantities in other Dirina species.

== Habitat and distribution ==
Dirina mexicana is distributed in certain coastal regions of Mexico, specifically from Laguna Manuela in Baja California south to Cabo San Lucas, including areas near Higuera de Zaragoza in Sinaloa. It is typically found on vertical or overhanging rocks and cliffs. Occasionally, it can be quite prevalent, with multiple specimens forming large mosaic patterns.

== Similar species ==
While Dirina mexicana has some similarities with D. insulana, D. immersa and D. cretacea, it is generally distinguishable by the yellowish tinge of its thallus. However, this character is variable, and sometimes the thallus can be only white or white-greyish.

Dirina mexicana shares its habitat with two other Dirina species, D. paradoxa and D. catalinariae. Yet, these species can be readily differentiated as both of them have conspicuously sessile apothecia, with a constricted base.

Another close relative of D. mexicana is D. pallescens. This species, unlike D. mexicana, which grows on rocks, is strictly corticolous, growing on tree bark. D. catalinariae, another closely related species, is also saxicolous like D. mexicana.

From a chemical standpoint, Dirina mexicana is notable for its unique composition of two unclassified substances, F and G, a characteristic only shared with its counterpart, Dirina pacifica.
