= Dirina cretacea =

Scientific classification
- Domain: Eukaryota
- Kingdom: Fungi
- Division: Ascomycota
- Class: Arthoniomycetes
- Order: Arthoniales
- Family: Roccellaceae
- Genus: Dirina
- Species: D. cretacea

Binomial name
- Dirina cretacea (Zahlbr.) Tehler (1983)

Synonyms
- Chiodecton cretaceum Zahlbr. (1899)

Species of lichen

Dirina cretacea is a species of saxicolous (rock-dwelling), crustose lichen in the family Roccellaceae. Its distribution is largely in the eastern Mediterranean, and in Andalusia, Spain.

== Taxonomy ==
It was formally described as a new species in 1899 by Alexander Zahlbruckner as a member of the genus Chiodecton. The type specimen was collected in Croatia. Anders Tehler transferred it to the genus Dirina in 1983.

== Description ==
Dirina cretacea has a flat to slightly uneven (rugose-verruculose) surface covered with a powdery coating (pruinose) that gives it a distinctive white-grey appearance. The thallus (main body of the lichen) measures 0.3–1.0 mm in thickness. Its anatomical structure consists of an outer protective layer (cortex) that is 40–60 μm thick, and an inner layer (medulla) that has a chalk-like consistency throughout, including near the rock surface. This species lacks soralia, which are specialized structures for asexual reproduction found in some other lichens.

The reproductive structures (ascomata) are numerous, sessile (attached directly to the surface without a stalk), and circular in outline without any constriction at the base. These structures are arranged in a distinctive pattern described as pluricarpocentral or pseudomonocarpocentral (stromatoid), meaning multiple fruiting bodies clustered together in a way that may appear as a single structure. The ascomata can measure more than 3.8 mm in diameter, with a white-grey powdery coating (pruina) evenly covering the disc. Each ascoma is surrounded by a complete rim of thalline tissue (thalline margin). The fungal spores (ascospores) measure 19–23 by 5–6 μm, with mean dimensions of 21.5 μm in length and 5.8 μm in width.

When tested with chemical spot tests, the thallus surface of D. cretacea is C+ (red), while both the medulla and disc show no reaction (C−). The species contains the secondary metabolite erythrin, though lecanoric acid is sometimes absent. D. cretacea is the only species in its genus with stromatoid, pseudomonocarpocentral ascomata, making it easily recognizable by this distinctive feature.

== Habitat and distribution ==
Dirina cretacea is found exclusively on calciferous (calcium-rich) rock surfaces, where its chalk-like medulla integrates with the substrate. This obligate saxicolous (rock-dwelling) lichen appears adapted to limestone and other calcareous substrates, which provide the alkaline conditions and minerals necessary for its growth. D. cretacea predominantly occurs in the eastern Mediterranean area, with its range extending throughout Cyprus and coastal regions surrounding the Adriatic, Ionian, and Aegean Seas. A single isolated population has been documented far from its main distribution in Andalusia, southern Spain.

The species has a distinctive biogeographical position within the genus Dirina, being most closely related to a group of four other species with different geographical distributions. These related species include D. teichiodes and D. sorocarpa from Cape Verde, D. monothalamia found in both Cape Verde and Senegal, and D. approximata from the Galapagos Islands.
