= Dirina canariensis =

Scientific classification
- Domain: Eukaryota
- Kingdom: Fungi
- Division: Ascomycota
- Class: Arthoniomycetes
- Order: Arthoniales
- Family: Roccellaceae
- Genus: Dirina
- Species: D. canariensis

Binomial name
- Dirina canariensis Tehler & Ertz (2013)

Species of lichen

Dirina canariensis is a species of saxicolous (rock-dwelling), crustose lichen in the family Roccellaceae. It is found in the Canary Islands, where it grows on vertical cliffs and acidic rocks. It was formally described as a new species in 2013 by lichenologists Anders Tehler and Damien Ertz. The type specimen was collected by the first author from the Puerto de Mogán (Gran Canaria); the species epithet refers to the type locality. The lichen has a creamy-white to brownish-white thallus (0.1–0.7 mm thick), a chalk-like medulla, and either soralia or apothecia on the thallus surface (but usually not both). If apothecia are present, they have a circular outline with a diameter of up to 1.5 mm; the discs are pruinose and encircled by a thalline margin. Ascospores measure 20–25 by 4–5 μm. The closest relatives of Dirina canariensis are the European species D. ceratoniae, D. massiliensis, and D. fallax.
