= Dirina angolana =

Scientific classification
- Domain: Eukaryota
- Kingdom: Fungi
- Division: Ascomycota
- Class: Arthoniomycetes
- Order: Arthoniales
- Family: Roccellaceae
- Genus: Dirina
- Species: D. angolana

Binomial name
- Dirina angolana Tehler & Ertz (2013)

Species of lichen

Dirina angolana is a species of corticolous (bark-dwelling), crustose lichen in the family Roccellaceae. Found in Angola, it was described from specimens collected in Luanda Province. It forms pale, creamy-white crusts on baobab tree bark near the coast and can be identified by a chemical test that turns its surface bright red.

== Taxonomy ==
The lichen was formally described as a new species in 2013 by the lichenologists Anders Tehler and Damien Ertz. The type specimen was collected by Tehler north of Palmeirinhas (Luanda Province). It is only known to occur in Angola, where it grows preferentially on baobab tree trunks, usually near the sea. The species epithet refers to the country of its type locality.

A 2017 molecular phylogenetic study that sampled several Dirina species recovered Dirina angolana as the sister species to Dirina astridae.

== Description ==
Dirina angolana is a strictly bark-dwelling (corticolous) lichen that forms a pale, creamy-white crust (thallus) 0.1–0.7 mm thick. The surface is generally smooth but may become faintly warty in places and never develops the floury bloom (pruina) seen in some other members of Dirina. Beneath a 25–45 μm-thick outer skin (cortex) lies a chalk-like white medulla; closer to the bark this inner layer turns looser and cottony as the fungal threads (hyphae) spread into fine fissures. No specialised vegetative propagules such as soralia are produced.

Reproductive bodies (apothecia) are frequent and conspicuous. They appear as round, sessile discs more than 1.5 mm across that sit flush on the thallus without any obvious stalk or constriction at the base. Each disc is covered by a uniform, grey-white powder (pruina) and is framed by a continuous, sometimes slightly wavy rim made from the lichen's own tissue (thalline margin). Inside, the asci contain eight colourless ascospores that are narrowly ellipsoid, 23–30 μm long and about 4–5 μm wide. A simple chemical spot test with commercial bleach (the C test) turns the thallus surface bright red, while the medulla remains unreactive and the disc colours only faintly—an indication of erythrin, lecanoric acid and three yet-unidentified compounds that characterise this species.
