= Dirina badia =

Scientific classification
- Domain: Eukaryota
- Kingdom: Fungi
- Division: Ascomycota
- Class: Arthoniomycetes
- Order: Arthoniales
- Family: Roccellaceae
- Genus: Dirina
- Species: D. badia

Binomial name
- Dirina badia (Tehler) Tehler & Ertz (2013)

Synonyms
- Roccellina badia Tehler (1983)

Species of lichen

Dirina badia is a species of crustose lichen in the family Roccellaceae. It is found on the small desert mountains of northern Peru, where it grows on both stone and on bark.

== Taxonomy ==
The lichen was formally described as a new species in 1983 by Anders Tehler, as a species of Roccellina. The type specimen, collected by the author along with Rolf Santesson, was found southeast of Chiclayo at an altitude between 200 and 500 m (660 and 1,640 ft). Tehler and Damien Ertz transferred it to the genus Dirina in 2013 based on the results of both molecular phylogenetic analysis and more thorough microscopic investigations.

== Description ==
The lichen has creamy-brown to brown, crustose thallus (0.1–1.5 mm thick) with a somewhat roughened surface texture, and a chalk-like medulla. When soralia are present – typically when ascomata are absent – they are punctate (point-like). If ascomata are present, they have a circular putline and a diameter of 0.5–2.0 mm, with a pruinose disc surrounded by a thalline margin. The ascospores are 27–33 by 4–5 μm. The expected results of chemical spot tests are C+ (red) on the thallus surface, C− on the medulla, and C+ (red) on the apothecial disc. Dirina badia contains erythrin, lecanoric acid, and a couple of other unidentified substances as lichen products.

== Habitat and distribution ==
The range of Dirina badia is restricted to northern Peru, where it is common on the small desert mountains. It is typically saxicolous, growing on acidic rock, but it has also been recorded growing on the bark of shrubs and small trees.
