= Dirina pacifica =

Scientific classification
- Domain: Eukaryota
- Kingdom: Fungi
- Division: Ascomycota
- Class: Arthoniomycetes
- Order: Arthoniales
- Family: Roccellaceae
- Genus: Dirina
- Species: D. pacifica

Binomial name
- Dirina pacifica Tehler & Ertz (2013)

Species of lichen

Dirina pacifica is a species of saxicolous (rock-dwelling), crustose lichen in the family Roccellaceae. It is found in both Hawaii and the Galápagos Islands, where it grows in coastal outcrops. The lichen was formally described as a new species in 2013 by Anders Tehler and Damien Ertz. The type specimen was collected from Koolaupoko (Oahu, Hawaii). The species epithet refers to the Pacific Ocean. It has a creamy white to greyish or brownish thallus (0.1–0.3 mm thick) lacking pruina, and a chalk-like medulla. Its ascomata have a circular outline up to 1.5 mm in diameter, with a whitish-grey disc. Its ascospores measure 19–27 by 4–5 μm. Dirina pacifica contains the lichen products erythrin, lecanoric acid, and sometimes three unidentified substances named "C", "F", and "G".
