= Dirina madagascariensis =

Scientific classification
- Domain: Eukaryota
- Kingdom: Fungi
- Division: Ascomycota
- Class: Arthoniomycetes
- Order: Arthoniales
- Family: Roccellaceae
- Genus: Dirina
- Species: D. madagascariensis

Binomial name
- Dirina madagascariensis Tehler, Ertz, Killmann, Razafindr., Sérus. & Eb.Fisch. (2013)

Species of lichen

Dirina madagascariensis is a species of crustose lichen in the family Roccellaceae. Found in southern Madagascar, it was formally described as a new species in 2013 by lichenologists Anders Tehler, Damien Ertz, Dorothee Killmann, Tahina Razafindrahaja, Emmanuël Sérusiaux, and Eberhard Fischer. The type specimen was collected by the second author from Taolagnaro (Fort-Dauphin). It has been recorded growing both on rocks (usually calciferous) and on the bark of various trees and shrubs. The lichen has a creamy white to white-greyish thallus (0.1–1.5 mm thick) with a chalk-like medulla. Its ascospores measure 25–35 by 4–5 μm. D. madagascariensis contains the lichen products erythrin, lecanoric acid, and the unidentified substances named "C" and "J"; it is this latter substance that is characteristic of this species.
