= Dirina astridae =

Scientific classification
- Domain: Eukaryota
- Kingdom: Fungi
- Division: Ascomycota
- Class: Arthoniomycetes
- Order: Arthoniales
- Family: Roccellaceae
- Genus: Dirina
- Species: D. astridae

Binomial name
- Dirina astridae Tehler (2013)

Species of lichen

Dirina astridae is a species of saxicolous (rock-dwelling), crustose lichen in the family Roccellaceae. Found in Mauritius, it was formally described as a new species in 2013 by Anders Tehler. The type specimen was collected by the author from the peak of Signal Mountain in Port Louis. The species epithet astridae refers to Tehler's daughter Astrid, "who led the way to this species on a joint field trip to Mauritius".

Dirina astridae is endemic to the Mascarene Islands, where it grows on acidic or volcanic rock. It contains the lichen products erythrin and lecanoric acid, as well as a few unidentified substances. The expected results for chemical spot tests are thallus surface C+ (red), medulla C−, and apothecial disc C+ (red).
