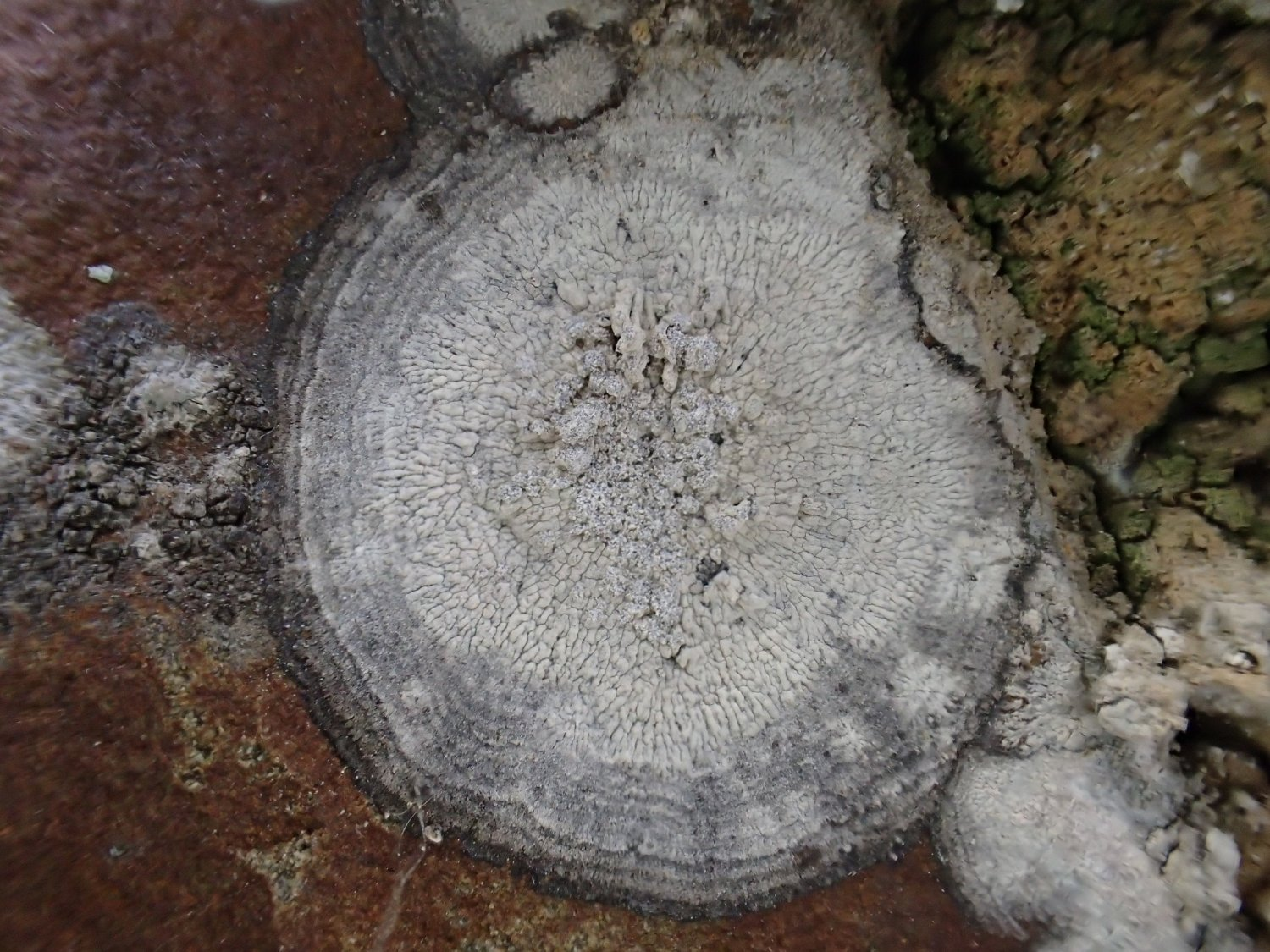
- in France

Scientific classification
- Domain: Eukaryota
- Kingdom: Fungi
- Division: Ascomycota
- Class: Arthoniomycetes
- Order: Arthoniales
- Family: Roccellaceae
- Genus: Dirina
- Species: D. fallax

Binomial name
- Dirina fallax De Not. (1846)

= Dirina fallax =

Species of lichen

Dirina fallax is a species of saxicolous (rock-dwelling), crustose lichen in the family Roccellaceae. It is found in the western Mediterranean, the Atlantic coasts of both Africa and Europe (extending from Scotland to Morocco), and central Europe, where it grows on siliceous and acidic rocks. In 2017, it was reported from the Abrau Peninsula in Russia.

== Taxonomy ==
The lichen was first described scientifically by Giuseppe De Notaris in 1846, from specimens collected in Sardinia, Italy. Tehler and colleagues unsuccessfully searched Italian herbaria for the type specimen, and therefore assigned a neotype from a specimen also collected in Sardinia.

== Description ==
The lichen has a creamy greyish-brown, crustose thallus with a somewhat roughened surface (0.1–1.5 mm thick), and a white, chalk-like medulla. When soralia are present (typically when apothecia are absent), they are punctiform to maculate. If apothecia are present, they have a circular outline and a diameter of 0.1–2.0 mm; the apothecial disc is white-grey, pruinose, and encircled by a thalline margin. Ascospores measure 18–24 by 5–6 μm. Dirina fallax contains the lichen products erythrin and lecanoric acid, as well as two unidentified substances. The expected results of chemical spot tests are C+ (faint red) on the thallus surface, C− on the medulla, and C+ (red) on the disc.
