= Dirina candida =

Scientific classification
- Domain: Eukaryota
- Kingdom: Fungi
- Division: Ascomycota
- Class: Arthoniomycetes
- Order: Arthoniales
- Family: Roccellaceae
- Genus: Dirina
- Species: D. candida

Binomial name
- Dirina candida (Müll.Arg.) Tehler & Ertz (2013)

Synonyms
- Chiodecton candidum Müll.Arg. (1885)

Species of lichen

Dirina candida is a species of saxicolous (rock-dwelling), crustose lichen in the family Roccellaceae. It is found in the southern Mediterranean basin, with a range extending east to Egypt and Libya. It grows on calcareous rocks that are close to the sea.

== Taxonomy ==
The lichen was formally described as a new species in 1885 by Johannes Müller Argoviensis from specimens collected in Alexandria, Egypt. Anders Teher and Damien Ertz transferred it to Dirina in 2013. Tehler had previously (1983) referred this species to Dirina immersa, but later molecular phylogenetics analysis revealed that it should instead be considered a distinct species, despite the two sharing the same appearance, morphology, and chemistry.

== Description ==
Dirina candida forms a flat, powdery-white to grey-white covering (thallus) that ranges from very thin to moderately thick (0.2–2.0 mm). The thallus has a distinct upper protective layer (cortex) measuring 30–50 μm in thickness, while its interior portion (medulla) has a chalk-like consistency throughout, including near the rock substrate. This species does not produce specialized structures for asexual reproduction called soralia.

The reproductive structures (ascomata) of D. candida are abundant, embedded within the thallus (immersed), and develop from a single growing point (monocarpocentral). These structures can be circular or linear in shape and measure 0.1–0.8 mm in diameter. Their surfaces (discs) are covered with a powdery coating (pruina) that has a cracked appearance (rimose) and appears white to grey-white. The discs typically lack a visible rim of thallus tissue (thalline margin), though a thin margin is occasionally present. Inside these reproductive structures, the fungus produces spores (ascospores) measuring 18–20 μm long by 5–7 μm wide, with average dimensions of 18.75 by 5.75 μm.

When tested with chemical spot tests, D. candida shows distinctive reactions that help in its identification. The thallus surface turns red when calcium hypochlorite (C) is applied, though this reaction may be faint or negative unless the uppermost layer is scraped away. The medulla consistently shows C+ (red). However, the reproductive discs do not react with this reagent (C−). The lichen contains several secondary metabolites, primarily erythrin, with occasional weak presence of lecanoric acid.

== Habitat & distribution ==
Dirina candida occurs in coastal areas of the southern Mediterranean region, ranging from Andalusia in Spain eastwards to Libya and Egypt. It is found exclusively on calcareous rocks in close proximity to the sea.
