= Dirina monothalamia =

Scientific classification
- Domain: Eukaryota
- Kingdom: Fungi
- Division: Ascomycota
- Class: Arthoniomycetes
- Order: Arthoniales
- Family: Roccellaceae
- Genus: Dirina
- Species: D. monothalamia

Binomial name
- Dirina monothalamia Tehler & Ertz (2013)

Species of lichen

Dirina monothalamia is a species of corticolous (bark-dwelling) in the family Roccellaceae. It occurs in Cape Verde and the nearby mainland of Senegal, where it is found in coastal outcrops on the bark of various trees; Senegalese populations are often on the bark of African baobab.

== Taxonomy ==
The lichen was formally described as a new species in 1837 by Antoine Laurent Apollinaire Fée as Chiodecton africanum, with a type specimen collected from Senegambia. In 2013, Anders Tehler and Damien Ertz proposed the new replacement name for the taxon. The species epithet monothalamia was the first epithet used by Antoine Laurent Apollinaire Fée for the original material of Chiodecton africanum, before he crossed it out and replaced it with africanum; this epithet could not be reused as it has been used for a different species in the interim (Diploschistes africanus (Kremp.) Zahlbr.), and is thus unavailable.

== Description ==
The lichen has a thallus that can grow on both rocks and tree bark, with a surface that is either flat or slightly bumpy. It ranges in color from creamy white to dark brown and is between 0.1 and 0.7 mm thick. The cortex of the thallus is 10–50 μm thick and the medulla, which is white and chalk-like, is located near the substrate. There are no soralia present.

The lichen has ascomata that are circular, with a diameter up to 2 mm. The ascomata are sessile, meaning they have no stalk, and the base is constricted. The disc of the ascomata is covered in a white, even surface or a finely rimose, pruina-covered surface . The thalline margin, which can be either smooth or wavy, is present and ranges in form from entire to strongly undulating. The ascospores of the lichen are between 23 and 28 by 4–5 μm in size.

Erythrin, lecanoric acid, and an unidentified substance "C" are lichen products that occur in Dirina monothalamia.
