= Dirina catalinariae =

Conservation status
- Vulnerable (NatureServe)

Scientific classification
- Domain: Eukaryota
- Kingdom: Fungi
- Division: Ascomycota
- Class: Arthoniomycetes
- Order: Arthoniales
- Family: Roccellaceae
- Genus: Dirina
- Species: D. catalinariae

Binomial name
- Dirina catalinariae Hasse (1911)

Species of lichen

Dirina catalinariae is a species of saxicolous (rock-dwelling), crustose lichen in the family Roccellaceae. It occurs in the southwestern United States, Mexico, and the Galápagos Islands.

== Taxonomy ==
The lichen was formally described as a new species in 1911 by Hermann Edward Hasse. The type specimen was collected on Catalina Island, where it was found growing on beach boulders near Avalon; the species epithet refers to its type locality. In 2013, Anders Tehler proposed the form Dirina catalinariae f. sorediata from specimens collected in Mexico, but this taxon is no longer considered to have independent taxonomic significance.

== Description ==
The lichen has a creamy white to greyish crustose thallus with a roughened surface texture that at times is nearly squamulose or somewhat fruticose. Soralia and ascomata often appear side-by-side on the thallus; it is the only member of Dirina in which sexual (fertile) and asexual (sterile) morphs are not differentiated into separate species. Its ascospores measure 23–29 by 5–6 μm. The expected results of chemical spot tests are C+ (red) on the surface of the thallus, the medulla, and the disc. Lichen products that occur in the species include erythrin, lecanoric acid, and some unidentified substances.

== Habitat and distribution ==
In North America, Dirina catalinariae is known to occur on coastal rocks and cliffs in California's Monterey County to Laguna Manuela in Mexico's Baja California. In 2008, it was recorded for the first time in the Southern Hemisphere, after it was found on the Galápagos Islands.
