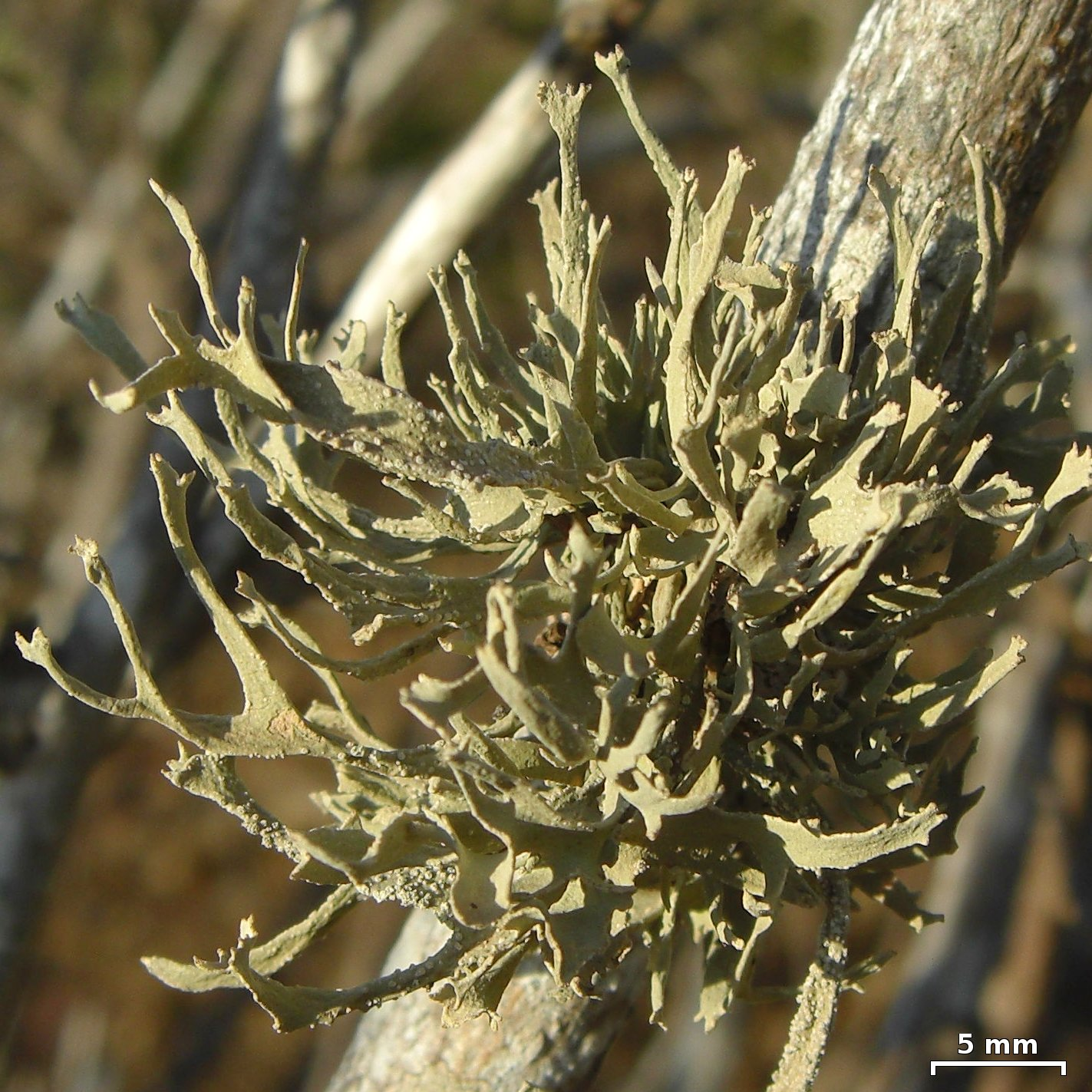

Scientific classification
- Domain: Eukaryota
- Kingdom: Fungi
- Division: Ascomycota
- Class: Arthoniomycetes
- Order: Arthoniales
- Family: Roccellaceae
- Genus: Roccella
- Species: R. gracilis

Binomial name
- Roccella gracilis Bory (1828)

Synonyms
- Roccella montagnei var. peruensis Kremp. (1876); Roccella peruensis (Kremp.) Darb. (1898); Roccella humboldtiana Follmann (2001)

= Roccella gracilis =

Species of lichen

Roccella gracilis is a species of fruticose lichen in the family Roccellaceae. Flourishing in coastal environments, Roccella gracilia predominantly grows along the coasts of Baja California and the Galápagos Islands, preferring the trunks, branches, and twigs of trees, but it is also found on rocks and cliffs. Its distribution spans coastal habitats from California south to Peru, including the Galápagos Islands and parts of the Caribbean.

== Description ==
Roccella gracilia has a fruticose (shrub-like) thallus, which can be either pendent or erect. The main branches of this lichen are flattened and relatively soft, typically measuring between 5 and 15 cm (2 and 6 in) in length. The surface of the lobes ranges in color from creamy to brownish and grayish, usually with a smooth texture. However, it is not uncommon for the lobe surface to be uneven, with by ridges and wrinkles.

Soredia, which are granular clusters of fungal and algal cells for asexual reproduction, are commonly found in Roccella gracilia but do not coexist with ascomata (spore-producing structures). These soredia turn C+ (red) and are located in maculiform (i.e., marked with spots) soralia, forming small patches that often merge to cover a significant portion of the lobe surface. The medulla, the inner layer of the lichen, is typically white but shows a yellow or yellowish coloration in the hold-fast zone, the area where the lichen attaches to its substrate.

Apothecia, the reproductive structures where spores are produced, have been observed in specimens from Baja California Sur but are absent when soredia are present. These apothecia are sessile, meaning they are directly attached to the substrate without a stalk. The ascospores of Roccella gracilia are measured to be 21–28 μm long and 3–4 μm wide.

In terms of chemical composition and reactions to spot tests, the cortex of Roccella gracilia reacts to a potassium hydroxide (K) test with a more or less yellowish-red color (which may sometimes be inconspicuous), C+ (red), KC+ (red), and P−. The medulla has spot test reactions of K−, C−, KC−, P−. The lichen contains secondary metabolites (lichen products) such as erythrin and lecanoric acid.

=== Similar species ===
Roccella gracilis is characterized by its relatively small ascospores, measuring 3–4 μm in width, and a less sturdy thallus compared to the closely related species, Rocella decipiens.

== Habitat and distribution ==
Roccella gracilia is a lichen known for its ability to grow large in appropriate coastal environments. It is predominantly found along the coasts of Baja California and the Galápagos Islands. In these coastal regions, it thrives on a variety of suitable substrates, showing a preference for growing on the trunks, branches, and twigs of different trees and shrubs. Sorediate forms, which reproduce asexually through soredia, are also commonly found on vertical rocks and cliffs. Specimens of Roccella gracilia that bear fruiting bodies (fertile specimens) are strictly corticolous, meaning they grow exclusively on the bark of trees.

The world distribution of Roccella gracilia is quite extensive along the coasts, stretching from north of the San Francisco area in California down to Arequipa, which is south of Lima, Peru. This distribution includes not only the Galápagos Islands but also a significant portion of the Caribbean region. Within the Sonoran region, its range extends from Southern California down to the tip of Baja California along the Pacific coast. This includes Guadalupe Island and extends into the southern parts of Sonora and adjacent Sinaloa.
