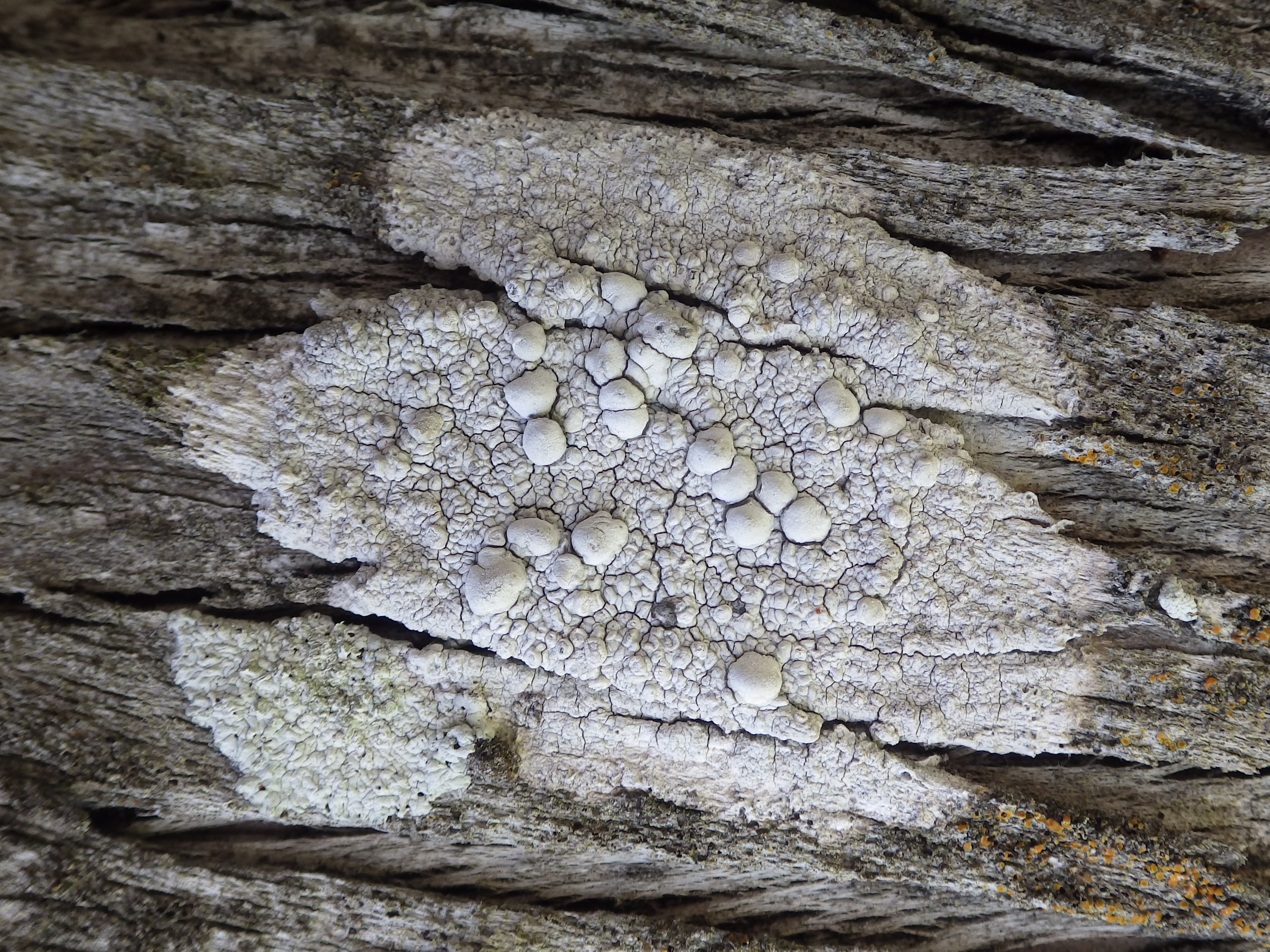

Scientific classification
- Domain: Eukaryota
- Kingdom: Fungi
- Division: Ascomycota
- Class: Arthoniomycetes
- Order: Arthoniales
- Family: Roccellaceae
- Genus: Dirina
- Species: D. ceratoniae

Binomial name
- Dirina ceratoniae (Ach.) Fr. (1831)

Synonyms
- List: Lecanora ceratoniae Ach. (1810); Lichen peltatus * ceratoniae (Ach.) Lam. (1813); Dirina repanda Fr. (1825); Parmelia ceratoniae (Ach.) Spreng. (1827); Urceolaria repanda (Fr.) Schaer. (1850); Secoliga repanda (Fr.) Norman (1852); Patellaria repanda (Fr.) Hepp (1857); Patellaria repanda var. ceratoniae (Ach.) Hepp (1857); Lecania ceratoniae (Ach.) Stizenb. (1862); Dirina repanda var. ceratoniae (Ach.) Stizenb. (1890)

= Dirina ceratoniae =

Species of lichen

Dirina ceratoniae is a species of crustose lichen in the family Roccellaceae. It is found in Europe, where it grows on both bark and on calcium-rich rock. The lichen was formally described as a new species in 1810 by Swedish lichenologist Erik Acharius. Elias Magnus Fries transferred the taxon to genus Dirina in 1831.

The lichen has a creamy white to whitish-green thallus with a slightly roughened surface that is 0.1–1.0 mm thick, and a chalk-like medulla. The soralia, if present (usually if apothecia are absent) are maculate to confluent. Apothecia, if present, have a circular outline, a diameter of 0.5–3.0 mm; the apothecial discs are pruinose, white- to dark grey in colour, and are surrounded by a thalline margin. Ascospores measure 21–26 by 4–5 μm. The expected results of chemical spot tests are C+ (red) on the thallus surface, C− on the medulla, and C+ (faintly red to negative) on the apothecial discs. Lichen products that occur in Dirina ceratoniae are erythrin, lecanoric acid, and an unidentified substance.

The lichen is common in Mediterranean Europe, with a range extending west to southern Portugal and northern Morocco. It is capable of growing both on bark, and on rock. Its plant substrates include the bark of Ficus carica, Ceratonia siliqua, Rosmarinus officinalis, Juniperus phoenicea, Pinus halepensis, P. pinea, Pistacia lentiscus. When it grows on stone, it prefers calcareous substrates. Dirina ceratoniae prefers dry and open areas, usually near the sea. In 2022, it was reported for the first time in Russia, in Dagestan. A couple of collections of the lichen have been made in the Canary Islands, but it is thought that these are the result of introductions from importing plants to the botanical gardens, parks, or hotels.
