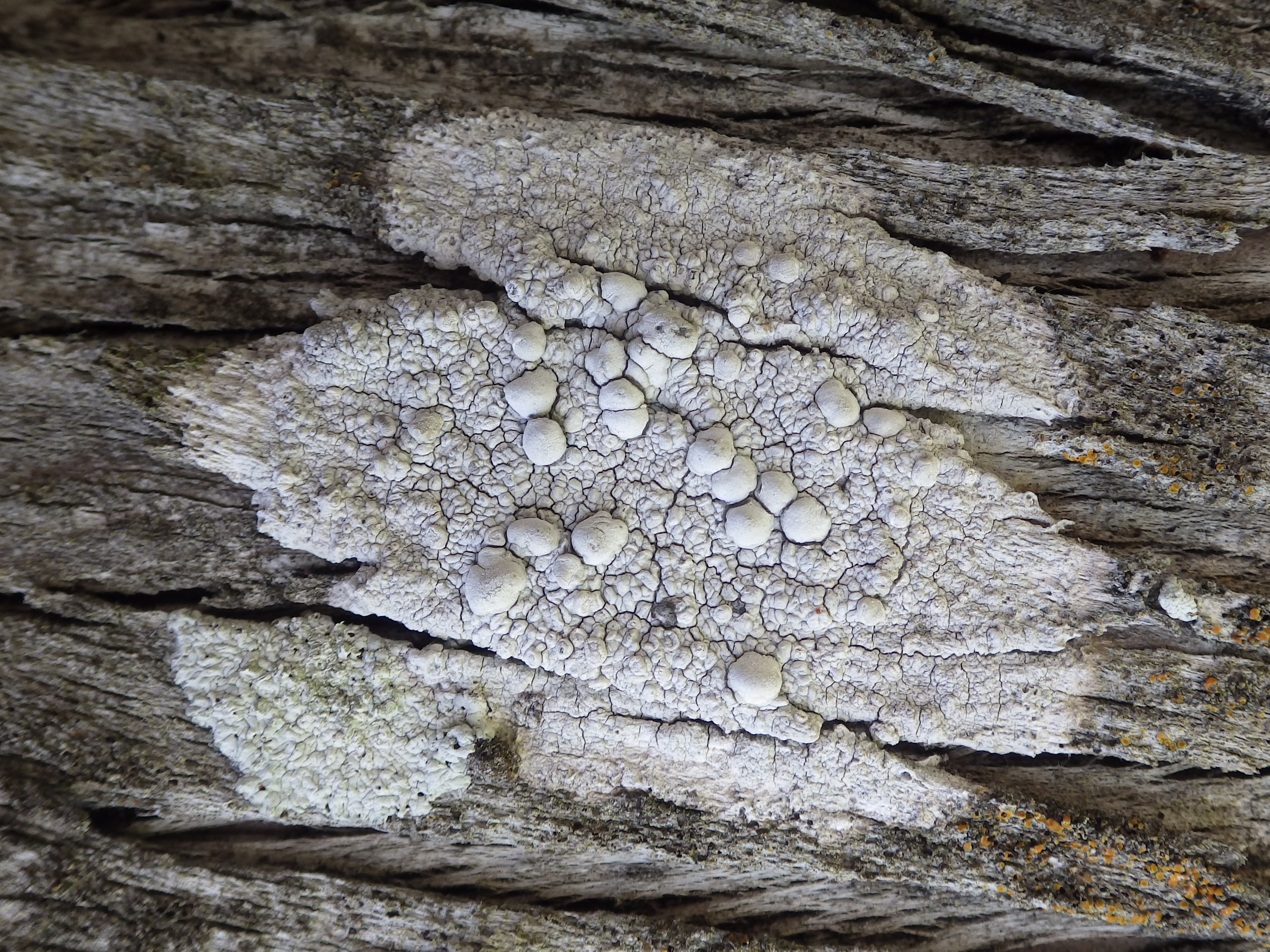
- Dirina ceratoniae

Scientific classification
- Domain: Eukaryota
- Kingdom: Fungi
- Division: Ascomycota
- Class: Arthoniomycetes
- Order: Arthoniales
- Family: Roccellaceae
- Genus: Dirina; Fr. (1825)

Type species
- Dirina ceratoniae (Ach.) Fr. (1831)

Species
- See text

Synonyms
- Dirinopsis De Not. (1846)

= Dirina =

Genus of lichen-forming fungi

Dirina is a genus of lichen-forming fungi in the family Roccellaceae. All Dirina species are crustose lichens with a whitish to greyish brown thallus, and live either on rock or on bark–some species can live on both. The photobiont partner is a member of the green algal genus Trentepohlia. Most species occur in the Northern Hemisphere, and are generally restricted to coastal habitats, where they may be locally quite common. Erythrin and lecanoric acid are lichen products that usually occur in Dirina species, along with several other unidentified substances.

The genus was circumscribed in 1825 by Elias Magnus Fries. Swedish lichenologist Anders Tehler published a monograph about the genus in 1983. Thirty years later, he and his colleagues revisited Dirina, combining evidence from molecular phylogenetic analysis with morphological and chemical analysis. They accepted 24 species in Dirina, 9 of which were described as new to science.

== Species ==
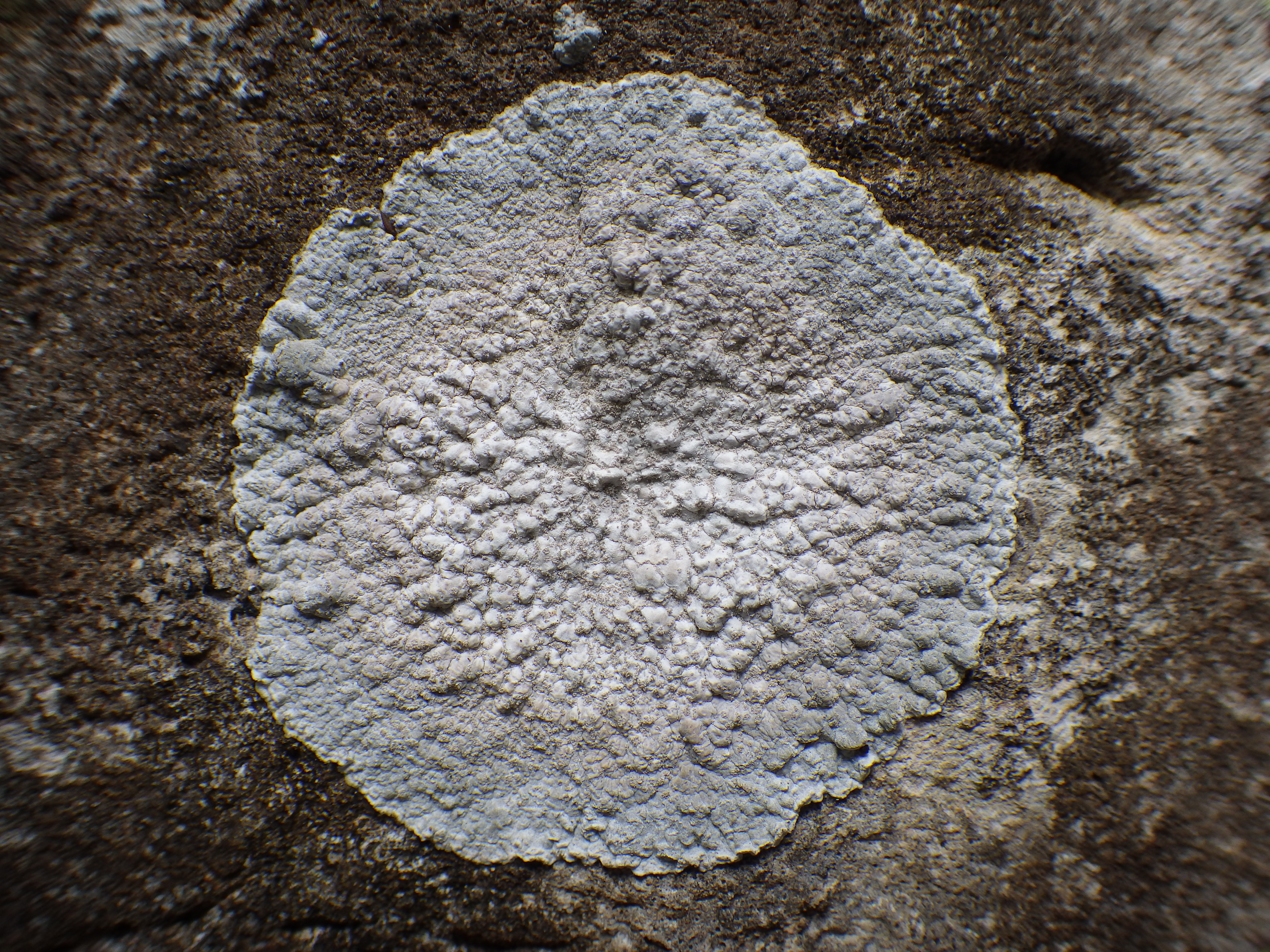
Dirina massiliensis f. sorediata

- Dirina angolana Tehler & Ertz (2013) – Angola
- Dirina approximata Zahlbr. (1931) – Galápagos Islands
- Dirina arabica Tehler & Ertz (2013) – Socotra Island
- Dirina astridae Tehler (2013) – Mauritius
- Dirina badia (Tehler) Tehler & Ertz (2013) – Peru
- Dirina canariensis Tehler & Ertz (2013) – Canary Islands
- Dirina candida (Müll.Arg.) Tehler & Ertz (2013) – Mediterranean Basin
- Dirina catalinariae Hasse (1911) – USA; Mexico
- Dirina ceratoniae (Ach.) Fr. (1831) – Mediterranean Basin
- Dirina cretacea (Zahlbr.) Tehler (1983) – Mediterranean Basin
- Dirina fallax De Not. (1846) – Africa; Europe
- Dirina immersa Müll.Arg. (1882) – Socotra Island
- Dirina indica Upreti & Nayaka (2013) – India
- Dirina insulana (Tav.) Tehler (1983) – Macaronesia; Europe
- Dirina jamesii (Tehler) Tehler & Ertz (2013) – St. Helena, Ascension Island; Africa
- Dirina madagascariensis Tehler, Ertz, Killmann, Razafindr., Sérus. & Eb.Fisch. (2013) – Madagascar
- Dirina massiliensis Durieu & Mont. (1848) – Mediterranean Basin; Central Europe
- Dirina mexicana Tehler (1995) – Mexico
- Dirina monothalamia Tehler & Ertz (2013) – Cape Verde; Senegal
- Dirina pacifica Tehler & Ertz (2013) – Galapagos Islands; Hawaii
- Dirina pallescens Tehler & Ertz (2013) – Mexico
- Dirina paradoxa (Fée) Tehler (1986) – Caribbean
- Dirina sorocarpa Tehler & Ertz (2013) – Cape Verde
- Dirina teichiodes (Stirt.) Tehler & Ertz (2013) – Cape Verde
