= Dirina pallescens =

Scientific classification
- Domain: Eukaryota
- Kingdom: Fungi
- Division: Ascomycota
- Class: Arthoniomycetes
- Order: Arthoniales
- Family: Roccellaceae
- Genus: Dirina
- Species: D. pallescens

Binomial name
- Dirina pallescens Tehler & Ertz (2013)

Species of lichen

Dirina pallescens is a species of corticolous (bark-dwelling), crustose lichen in the family Roccellaceae. Found in Mexico, it was formally described as a new species in 2013 by Anders Tehler and Damien Ertz. The type specimen was collected by the first author near Todos Santos, Baja California Sur. It has also been recorded from Sonora and Oaxaca, growing near the sea on various trees and shrubs, including Bursera and mangrove. The species epithet alludes to its pale thallus, which is usually creamy white to white-brownish in colour. Dirina pallescens contains the lichen products erythrin, lecanoric acid, and two unidentified substances named "B" and "C".
