= Dennys Reyes =

Mexican baseball player (born 1977)

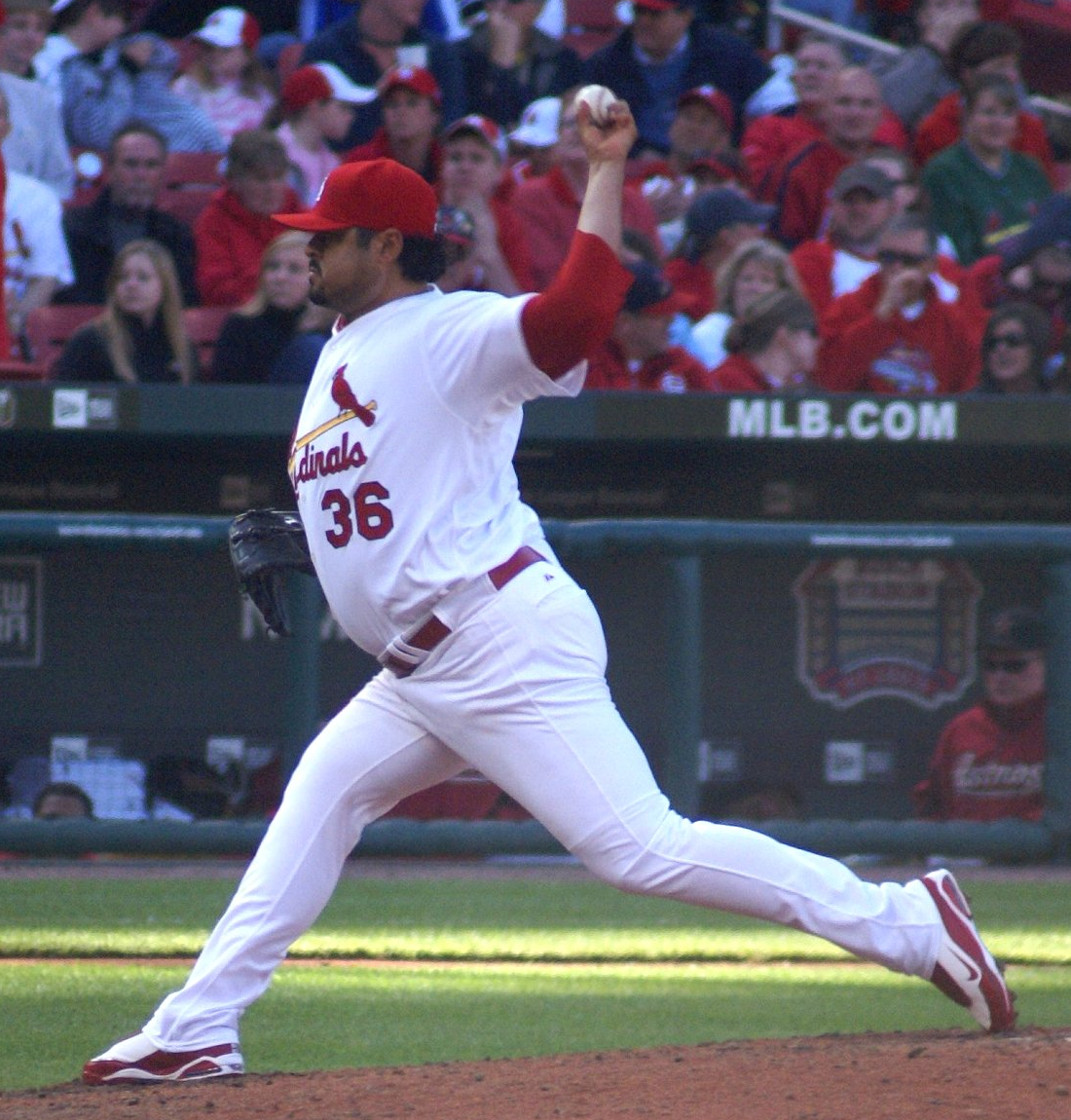
- Reyes with the St. Louis Cardinals
- Pitcher
- Born: April 19, 1977 (age 49); Higuera de Zaragoza, Sinaloa, Mexico
- Batted: Right Threw: Left

MLB debut
- July 13, 1997, for the Los Angeles Dodgers

Last appearance
- April 6, 2011, for the Boston Red Sox

MLB statistics
- Win–loss record: 35–35
- Earned run average: 4.21
- Strikeouts: 642
- Stats at Baseball Reference

Teams
- Los Angeles Dodgers (1997–1998); Cincinnati Reds (1998–2001); Colorado Rockies (2002); Texas Rangers (2002); Pittsburgh Pirates (2003); Arizona Diamondbacks (2003); Kansas City Royals (2004); San Diego Padres (2005); Minnesota Twins (2006–2008); St. Louis Cardinals (2009–2010); Boston Red Sox (2011)

Dennys Reyes Velarde (Spanish pronunciation: [ˈdenis ˈreʝes]; born April 19, 1977) is a Mexican former professional baseball pitcher. In more than a decade-long career in Major League Baseball (MLB), he played for 11 different teams, often as a left-handed specialist. Nicknamed "the Big Sweat", during his career he was listed at 6 feet 3 inches (1.91 m) and 250 pounds (110 kg). He held the MLB record for games pitched by a Mexico-born player with 673, until surpassed by Joakim Soria in 2019.

== Personal life ==
=== Childhood and family ===
Reyes was born in Higuera de Zaragoza, Sinaloa, Mexico and attended Ignacio Zaragoza High School in Mexico. He is married to Claudia and has two sons: Dennys Alejandro and Cristian de Jesus. Reyes has been criticized about his weight.

He has a baseball stadium named after him in his native Higuera de Zaragoza, Mexico.

== Professional career ==
=== Los Angeles Dodgers ===
Reyes signed with the Los Angeles Dodgers as an undrafted free agent in 1993. He made his major league debut for the Dodgers on July 13, 1997, at age 20 against the San Francisco Giants. In six innings, Reyes allowed three earned runs on four hits while striking out six and walking four to earn the win. He was the second youngest player in the league at the time, four days older than Atlanta Braves outfielder Andruw Jones. Reyes pitched with the Dodgers for parts of two seasons, compiling a record of 2–7 with a 4.18 earned run average (ERA) in 25 games (eight starts).

=== Cincinnati Reds ===
On July 4, 1998, Reyes was traded by the Dodgers along with Paul Konerko to the Cincinnati Reds for Jeff Shaw. Reyes spent three and a half seasons with Cincinnati, pitching in 170 games (14 starts) while compiling a record of 9–10 with two saves and an ERA of 4.40.

=== Colorado Rockies ===
On December 18, 2001, Reyes was traded by the Reds with Pokey Reese to the Colorado Rockies for Gabe White and Luke Hudson. He began the 2002 season pitching out of the Rockies bullpen, going 0–1 with a 4.24 ERA in 43 relief appearances.

=== Texas Rangers ===
On July 31, 2002, Reyes was traded to the Texas Rangers along with Todd Hollandsworth in exchange for Gabe Kapler and Jason Romano. While with Texas, he split time between the bullpen and starting rotation, posting a 4–3 record with a 6.38 ERA in 15 games (five starts).

=== Pittsburgh Pirates ===
On January 23, 2003, Reyes signed a minor league contract with the Pittsburgh Pirates. On March 25, it was announced that he had made the Opening Day roster. On May 17, Reyes was designated for assignment to make room for Pat Mahomes. At the time, he had posted a 10.45 ERA in 12 games. The Pirates released Reyes on May 19.

=== Arizona Diamondbacks ===
On June 11, 2003, Reyes signed with the Arizona Diamondbacks. He made three relief appearances with Arizona in the final month of the season, recording an ERA of 11.57.

=== Kansas City Royals ===
On December 2, 2003, Reyes signed with the Kansas City Royals for the 2004 season. He spent the entire season with the Royals, going 4–8 with a 4.75 ERA in 40 games (12 starts). With the Royals, Reyes had

=== San Diego Padres ===
On November 29, 2004, Reyes signed a one-year, $550,000 contract with the San Diego Padres. He was released on July 17, 2005, after posting a 3–2 record with a 5.15 ERA in 36 games (one start).

=== Minnesota Twins ===
On February 21, 2006, Reyes signed a free agent contract with the Minnesota Twins worth $550,000. In 2006, Reyes posted a record of 5–0 with a career-best 0.89 ERA in 66 relief appearances. On August 24, 2006, he was signed to a two-year, $2 million contract extension. In the 2006 American League Divisional Series against the Oakland Athletics, Reyes appeared in two games, recording a 9.00 ERA. He continued as a left-handed specialist in the Twins bullpen in 2007 and 2008. In 2008, he had the lowest average pitches per game pitched, with 9.

=== St. Louis Cardinals ===
On March 5, 2009, Reyes signed a two-year contract with the St. Louis Cardinals worth approximately $3 million. He made 75 relief appearances in his first season with the Cardinals, going 0–2 with one save and a 3.29 ERA. In 2010, he was 3–1 with one save and a 3.55 ERA in 59 appearances.

=== Philadelphia Phillies ===
On December 9, 2010, Reyes agreed to a one-year, $1.25 million contract with the Philadelphia Phillies. The deal included a club option for 2012. However, the deal fell apart and Reyes remained a free agent.

=== Boston Red Sox ===
On February 5, 2011, Reyes signed a minor league deal with the Boston Red Sox and attended spring training as a non-roster invitee. He made the team's opening day roster, and was the only left-handed pitcher in the Red Sox bullpen at the start of the season. On April 8, he was designated for assignment, thus ending his short tenure with the Red Sox. In four games, Reyes posted a 16.20 ERA, including an outing where he allowed three earned runs without retiring a batter. He was later assigned to Triple-A Pawtucket Red Sox.

=== Baltimore Orioles ===
Reyes signed a minor league contract with the Baltimore Orioles on January 30, 2012. He also received an invitation to spring training. On March 4, 2012, Reyes was released by the Orioles for failure to report to Spring training.

=== Naranjeros de Hermosillo ===
Reyes was hurt for most of 2012, but he later signed with the Naranjeros de Hermosillo of the Mexican Pacific League. He pitched his first game for the team as a starter on November 2, 2012.
