= Dirina arabica =

Scientific classification
- Kingdom: Fungi
- Division: Ascomycota
- Class: Arthoniomycetes
- Order: Arthoniales
- Family: Roccellaceae
- Genus: Dirina
- Species: D. arabica

Binomial name
- Dirina arabica Tehler & Ertz (2013)

Species of lichen

Dirina arabica is a species of saxicolous (rock-dwelling), crustose lichen in the family Roccellaceae. Found in Socotra, it was formally described as a new species in 2013 by lichenologists Anders Tehler and Damien Ernst. The type specimen was collected by the first author near the village in Homill, at an altitude of 350 m (1,150 ft). The species epithet refers to Arabia, the geographical location encompassing the type locality. The lichen is endemic to Socotra, where it grows on Eocene limestone rocks. It has a creamy-white, slightly pruinose thallus that is 0.1–0.5 mm thick and a chalk-like medulla. There are no soralia on the thallus. The ascomata have a circular outline and measure up to 2.0 mm in diameter, and have a pruinose, white-grey disc with a thalline margin. Dirina arabica is a sister species to Dirina immersa, a sympatric species that can be distinguished from the former by its immersed ascomata.
