= Dirina indica =

Scientific classification
- Kingdom: Fungi
- Division: Ascomycota
- Class: Arthoniomycetes
- Order: Arthoniales
- Family: Roccellaceae
- Genus: Dirina
- Species: D. indica

Binomial name
- Dirina indica Upreti & Nayaka (2013)

Species of lichen

Dirina indica is a species of corticolous (bark-dwelling), crustose lichen in the family Roccellaceae. It is found on the west coast of India (Gujarat), the southern coast of the Arabian Peninsula in Yemen, and on Socotra Island, where it grows on the bark of various trees and shrubs.

== Taxonomy ==
The lichen was formally described as a new species in 2013 by Dalip Kumar Upreti and Sanjeeva Nayaka. The type specimen was collected from Pirotan Island in the Marine National Park (Arabian Sea). The species epithet refers to India, the geographical region of its type locality.

== Description ==
Dirina indica has a flat to slightly bumpy surface that is creamy white or whitish green in color and not covered in any powdery residue (pruina). There are no soralia. The ascomata, which are the fruiting bodies of the lichen, are circular, sessile, and have a diameter of up to 0.5 mm. They have a powdery white disc and a smooth margin. The ascospores are about 23–33 μm long and 4 μm wide. The lichen has a chalky medulla with loose hyphae near the substrate, and a cortex that is 20–30 μm thick.
