= Dirina approximata =

Scientific classification
- Domain: Eukaryota
- Kingdom: Fungi
- Division: Ascomycota
- Class: Arthoniomycetes
- Order: Arthoniales
- Family: Roccellaceae
- Genus: Dirina
- Species: D. approximata

Binomial name
- Dirina approximata Zahlbr. (1931)

Synonyms
- Dirina herrei Zahlbr. (1931); Dirina paradoxa subsp. approximata (Zahlbr.) Tehler (1986)

Species of lichen

Dirina approximata is a species of corticolous (bark-dwelling), crustose lichen in the family Roccellaceae. It was formally described by Alexander Zahlbruckner in 1931. It is endemic to the Galápagos Islands, where it grows on the bark of various trees and shrubs. Its sister species is Dirina sorocarpa, which is endemic to the Cape Verde Islands; Anders Tehler suggests that the large disjunct distribution between the two is the result of "ancient long distance dispersal event".
