= Higuera de Zaragoza =

- City
- Interactive map of Higuera de Zaragoza
- Coordinates: 25°57′N 109°17′W
- Country: Mexico
- State: Sinaloa
- Municipality: Ahome
- Elevation: 9 m (30 ft)

Population
  - Total: 8,976

Higuera de Zaragoza (locally [iˈɣeɾa ðe saɾaˈɣosa]) is a city in the municipality of Ahome in the northwestern part of the state of Sinaloa, Mexico. It lies at latitude 25° 59' N, longitude 109° 20' W at an elevation of 9 meters above sea level. It is located on the Gulf of California between Agiabampo and Topolobampo, near Las Grullas. The community had a 2005 census population of 8,976 inhabitants and is the third-largest town in the municipality, after Los Mochis and Ahome.

The city is the birthplace of Major League baseball pitcher Dennys Reyes.

== Geography ==
=== Climate ===
Climate data for Higuera de Zaragoza (1951–2010)
Month	Jan	Feb	Mar	Apr	May	Jun	Jul	Aug	Sep	Oct	Nov	Dec	Year
Record high °C (°F)	36.0 (96.8)	36.5 (97.7)	38.0 (100.4)	39.5 (103.1)	40.0 (104.0)	42.0 (107.6)	44.0 (111.2)	44.5 (112.1)	43.0 (109.4)	43.0 (109.4)	38.5 (101.3)	39.0 (102.2)	44.5 (112.1)
Mean daily maximum °C (°F)	24.7 (76.5)	26.2 (79.2)	28.2 (82.8)	30.9 (87.6)	33.6 (92.5)	36.1 (97.0)	37.1 (98.8)	36.8 (98.2)	36.0 (96.8)	34.0 (93.2)	29.5 (85.1)	25.1 (77.2)	31.5 (88.7)
Daily mean °C (°F)	17.8 (64.0)	18.7 (65.7)	20.0 (68.0)	22.3 (72.1)	25.1 (77.2)	28.8 (83.8)	30.9 (87.6)	30.9 (87.6)	30.1 (86.2)	27.2 (81.0)	22.3 (72.1)	18.4 (65.1)	24.4 (75.9)
Mean daily minimum °C (°F)	10.9 (51.6)	11.2 (52.2)	11.8 (53.2)	13.8 (56.8)	16.6 (61.9)	21.5 (70.7)	24.8 (76.6)	24.9 (76.8)	24.2 (75.6)	20.3 (68.5)	15.0 (59.0)	11.7 (53.1)	17.2 (63.0)
Record low °C (°F)	2.5 (36.5)	2.0 (35.6)	4.5 (40.1)	6.5 (43.7)	8.0 (46.4)	11.5 (52.7)	19.0 (66.2)	19.5 (67.1)	17.5 (63.5)	12.0 (53.6)	5.5 (41.9)	1.6 (34.9)	1.6 (34.9)
Average precipitation mm (inches)	16.9 (0.67)	11.3 (0.44)	4.2 (0.17)	0.5 (0.02)	0.8 (0.03)	1.5 (0.06)	43.4 (1.71)	89.7 (3.53)	87.3 (3.44)	31.5 (1.24)	15.2 (0.60)	21.1 (0.83)	323.4 (12.73)
Average precipitation days (≥ 0.1 mm)	1.7	1.3	0.6	0.2	0.1	0.3	4.8	6.9	4.4	1.8	1.3	2.1	25.5
Source: Servicio Meteorologico Nacional
