= Dirina sorocarpa =

Scientific classification
- Domain: Eukaryota
- Kingdom: Fungi
- Division: Ascomycota
- Class: Arthoniomycetes
- Order: Arthoniales
- Family: Roccellaceae
- Genus: Dirina
- Species: D. sorocarpa

Binomial name
- Dirina sorocarpa Tehler & Ertz (2013)

Species of lichen

Dirina sorocarpa is a species of saxicolous (rock-dwelling), crustose lichen in the family Roccellaceae. Found in Cape Verde, it was formally described as a new species in 2013 by Anders Tehler and Damien Ertz. The lichen has a creamy white to white-brownish thallus measuring 0.1–0.5 mm thick and a chalk-like medulla. Its ascospores are 21–30 by 4–5 μm. The species epithet alludes to the fact that the ascocarps, if they are present, are often partially sorediate or are produced on the same regions of the thallus as the soralia.
