= Acidic rock =

Acidic rock or acid rock refers to the chemical composition of igneous rocks that has 63% wt% SiO_{2} content. Rocks described as acidic usually contain more than 20% of free quartz. Typical acidic rocks are granite or rhyolite.

The term is used in chemical classification of igneous rock based on the content of silica (SiO_{2}). Because chemical analyzes are not always available, especially during the fieldwork, classification based on the mineral (modal) composition is more often used (dividing the igneous rocks into felsic/leucocratic, mafic/melanocratic and ultramafic).

The term "silicic", widely used in South America, has wider meaning, however, is often used as broadly synonymous with "acidic".

Terms describing composition of igneous rocks as acidic or basic evolved during the 19th century. It was based on the idea that high silica rocks are acidic and on the contrary the rocks with low silica content are basic. Although this idea is erroneous in a chemical sense (acidic rocks don't have low pH), both terms are used today.

== See also ==
- Felsic rock
