= Erythrin =

Lichen secondary metabolite

Names
- Other names D-erythrin; erythric acid; erythrinic acid

Identifiers
CAS Number	480-57-9
3D model (JSmol)	Interactive image
ChEBI	CHEBI:144149
ChemSpider	52085374
PubChem CID	72946996
UNII	4TJZ1118I8
- InChI: Key: BUBBEHCXSMCYNY-CVEARBPZSA-N
- SMILES: CC1=C(C(=O)OC2=CC(C)=C(C(=O)OC[C@H](O)[C@H](O)CO)C(O)=C2)C(O)=CC(O)=C1

Properties
Chemical formula	C_{20}H_{22}O_{10}
Molar mass	422.38 g·mol^{−1}
Appearance	Pale yellow needles
Melting point	156 to 157 °C (313 to 315 °F; 429 to 430 K)
- Except where otherwise noted, data are given for materials in their standard state (at 25 °C [77 °F], 100 kPa). Infobox references

Erythrin is a lichen secondary metabolite in the depside class. It is the D-erythritol ester of lecanoric acid and occurs especially in lichens of the genus Roccella, although it has also been reported from other members of the order Arthoniales. Historically, erythrin-containing Roccella lichens formed part of the raw material used to make orchil and cudbear dyes.

== History ==
Erythrin was isolated from dye lichens of the genus Roccella by the early 19th century. In 1845, Edward Schunck re-examined Roccella tinctoria, reported that his results did not fully agree with earlier analyses, referred to the principal crystalline constituent as "erythric acid", and showed that it yielded orcin on alkaline decomposition. Later 19th-century work by Edward Schunck, John Stenhouse and Oswald Hesse connected it with lecanoric acid and erythritol, the latter being first obtained by hydrolysis of erythrin. By 1914, however, erythrin's constitution was still under debate. Ernst Zerner reviewed earlier structural proposals by de Luynes and Oswald Hesse, rejected them on the basis of erythrin's acidic properties and its behaviour on hydrolysis and alcoholysis, and proposed a revised structure. This chemistry gave the compound practical importance in the orchil and cudbear dye trade, because hydrolysis of erythrin ultimately leads to orcinol, a precursor of orcein pigments.

Modern structural work began with studies of Roccella montagnei. In 1940, V. Subba Rao and Tiruvengadam Rajagopala Seshadri described erythrin as one of the principal chemical constituents of that lichen and proposed a close relationship to lecanoric acid. Two years later, they published a constitutional study concluding that erythrin is the erythrityl ester of lecanoric acid. The assignment was later supported by laboratory synthesis of racemic erythrin in 1966.

== Chemistry ==
Erythrin is an orcinol-type depside with the molecular formula C_{20}H_{22}O_{10}. Structurally, it can be regarded as lecanoric acid in which the remaining carboxyl group is esterified with erythritol. Hydrolysis yields lecanoric acid and erythritol, while further hydrolysis of lecanoric acid produces orsellinic acid. Early workers described erythrin as forming bundles of pale yellow needles with a melting point of 156–157 °C. The natural product is optically active, a standard reference work gives a specific rotation of [α]D +8.0 for erythrin crystallised from methanol.

In a study of the water solubility of common lichen compounds, erythrin was the most soluble substance examined, dissolving to 57 mg/l at 25 °C. The authors attributed this relatively high solubility chiefly to the additional alcoholic hydroxy groups in its erythritol side chain, and suggested that such solubility could allow lichen compounds to act as metal-complexing agents in rock weathering.

Synthetic work has mainly served to confirm the structure rather than to produce the compound on a practical scale. Racemic erythrin was synthesised in 1966 by building the erythritol side chain onto lecanoric acid through a cis-2-butene-1,4-diol intermediate, followed by hydroxylation and loss of the ethoxycarbonyl group. The final optically inactive product matched natural erythrin in its ultraviolet and infrared spectra, and the hexaacetate prepared from the synthetic product likewise matched the corresponding derivative obtained from natural erythrin. A later biomimetic synthesis produced both enantiomers of erythrin in stereochemically defined form. Comparison of the synthetic products with an authentic natural sample, including chiral HPLC analysis and optical rotation data, supported assignment of the natural compound as (+)-erythrin with the (2R,3S) configuration. A still shorter synthesis of (-)-erythrin was reported in 2013. In that route, two orsellinic-acid-derived intermediates were coupled, and the resulting benzodioxinone derivative was then reacted with benzyl-protected D-erythritol before final hydrogenolysis furnished (-)-erythrin. The authors presented this method as requiring fewer synthetic steps than earlier routes.

== Occurrence and chemotaxonomy ==
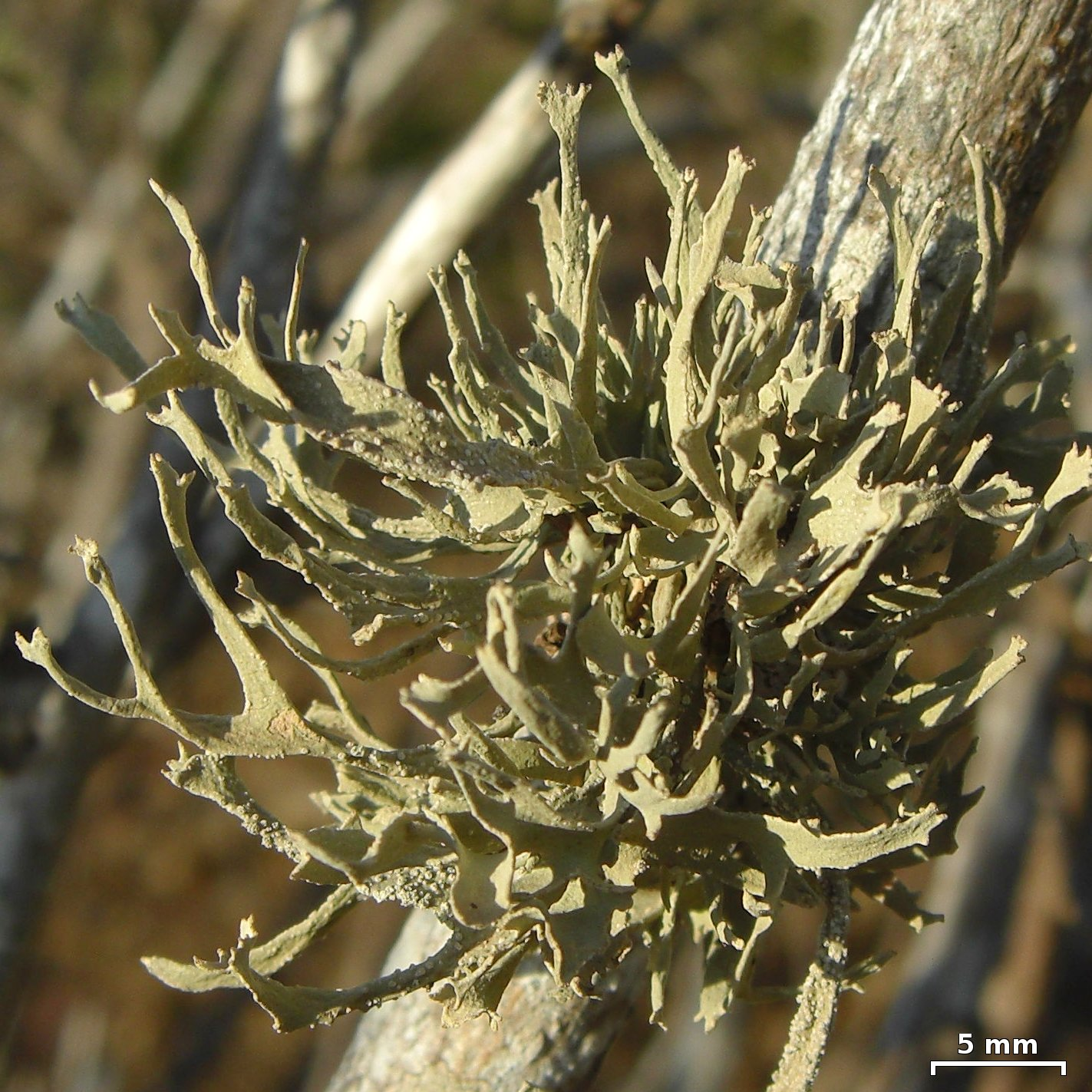
Roccella gracilis is one of several members of the genus Roccella that contain erythrin.

Roccella montagnei is the classic source of erythrin. Subsequent taxonomic and chemical studies have reported it from numerous species of Roccella. In a 2020 comparison of five coastal Roccella species, erythrin was detected in all five, and the authors also compiled earlier reports indicating its presence in about 18 of the roughly 54 taxa then recognised in the genus.

The compound is not confined to Roccella. It has also been reported from other Arthonialean lichens, including species of Dirina and Opegrapha. Broader chemotaxonomic surveys of the families Opegraphaceae and Arthoniaceae likewise recorded erythrin and lecanoric acid as characteristic constituents in parts of those groups.

Because closely related lichens can differ in whether they produce erythrin, lecanoric acid, or both, the compound has been used since at least the late 1960s as a chemotaxonomic character. Modern authors have described it as a chemotaxonomic marker for Roccella, and earlier Indian workers used erythrin together with roccellic acid to detect Roccella material in mixed lichen collections.

== Identification ==
Classical identification of erythrin relied on solvent extraction, recrystallisation, melting point, and simple colour reactions. In alcoholic solution it gives a violet reaction with ferric chloride and an orange-red reaction with calcium hypochlorite (bleaching powder). In routine lichenology, thalli containing erythrin often give a red reaction in the C spot test, and standard reference works list its behaviour in thin-layer chromatography and high-performance liquid chromatography.

Later work added spectroscopic and mass-spectrometric methods. Reference works record ultraviolet, infrared, nuclear magnetic resonance and mass spectra for erythrin, and published MS/MS studies describe a characteristic fragmentation pattern for the compound.

== Biosynthesis ==
Like other lichen depsides, erythrin is thought to arise from fungal polyketide biosynthesis. Its aromatic core corresponds to lecanoric acid, and heterologous expression experiments with a lichen non-reducing polyketide synthase have shown that a single enzyme can assemble the two phenolic rings and join them by an ester linkage to form the depside core.

== Biological activity ==
Compared with many other lichen products, erythrin itself has received little direct pharmacological study. A 2023 review of lichen depsides listed it among compounds that remained poorly investigated biologically. Published laboratory work has focused more on synthetic erythrin derivatives than on erythrin itself.
