= Follmanniella =

Scientific classification
- Domain: Eukaryota
- Kingdom: Fungi
- Division: Ascomycota
- Class: Arthoniomycetes
- Order: Arthoniales
- Family: Roccellaceae
- Genus: Follmanniella; Peine & Werner

Type species
- Follmanniella scutellata Peine & B. Werner

Genus of fungi

Follmanniella is a genus of lichenized fungi in the family Roccellaceae. A monotypic genus, it contains the single species Follmanniella scutellata.

The genus name of Follmanniella is in honour of Otto Follmann (1856 – 1926), who was a German geologist, paleontologist and educator.

The genus was circumscribed by Jörg Peine and Birgit Werner in Flechten Follmann on page 289 in 1995, and then in Biblioth. Lichenol. Vol.107 on page 38 in 2012 (Sekundär-Literatur).
