= Otto Follmann =

German geologist, paleontologist and educator

Otto Follmann (10 December 1856 in Landscheid – 11 June 1926 in Koblenz, Germany) was a German geologist, paleontologist and educator.

== Life and work ==
Follmann's father, Hilarius Follmann, was a teacher in the rural village of Landscheid in the Eifel mountains in western Germany. The Eifel poet Peter Zirbes was among his students and in addition to being the local teacher he also held a degree in husbandry (Wiesenbaumeister).

Follmann attended the Friedrich-Wilhelm-Gymnasium (high school) in Trier. After his graduation in 1878 he went on to study math and sciences in Berlin, Münster and Bonn ultimately specialising in geology. He received his PhD from the University of Bonn for his work on the geology of the Eifel region (Die unterdevonischen Schichten von Olkenbach) and worked afterwards shortly as an assistant at the institute for geology. Later he worked as a teacher at a gymnasium in Bonn and in 1889 he became a teacher for math and sciences at the Kaiserin-Augusta-Gymnasium (today Görres-Gymnasium) in Koblenz, where he stayed until his retirement in 1923. Aside from working as a teacher Follmann continued his research into the geology of the Eifel regions and became a well regarded expert on the subject. Best known among his many publications is the seminal monography Die Eifel, which saw several editions. The University of Bonn appointed him a professor without pay (Honorarprofessor) for his research in 1908.

In 1926 Follmann fell severely ill and died on June 11.

The Otto-Follmann-Straße in Landscheid and the Follmannstraße in Koblenz are two streets that are named after him. In the field of Archaeobotany, a genus of historical lichens called Follmannia published in 1967 by Carroll William Dodge and also Follmanniella, which is a lichenized genus of fungi in the family Roccellaceae, published in 2012 by Jörg Peine and Birgit Werner, also honours Follmann, as well.

== Works (selection) ==
- Die unterdevonischen Schichten von Olkenbach. Dissertation, Uni Bonn, 1882
- Die Eifel. J. Engelhorn, Stuttgart, 1894 (Review at JSTOR)
- Vulkanwegführer Andernach-Gerolstein. Schaar & Dathe 1914, Trier 1914
- Abriss der Geologie der Eifel. G. Westermann, 1915
- Der Trierer Geologe Johannes Steininger (1794–1874). Lintz, Trier 1920
- Die Koblenzschichten am Mittelrhein und im Moselgebiet. Bonn, 1925
