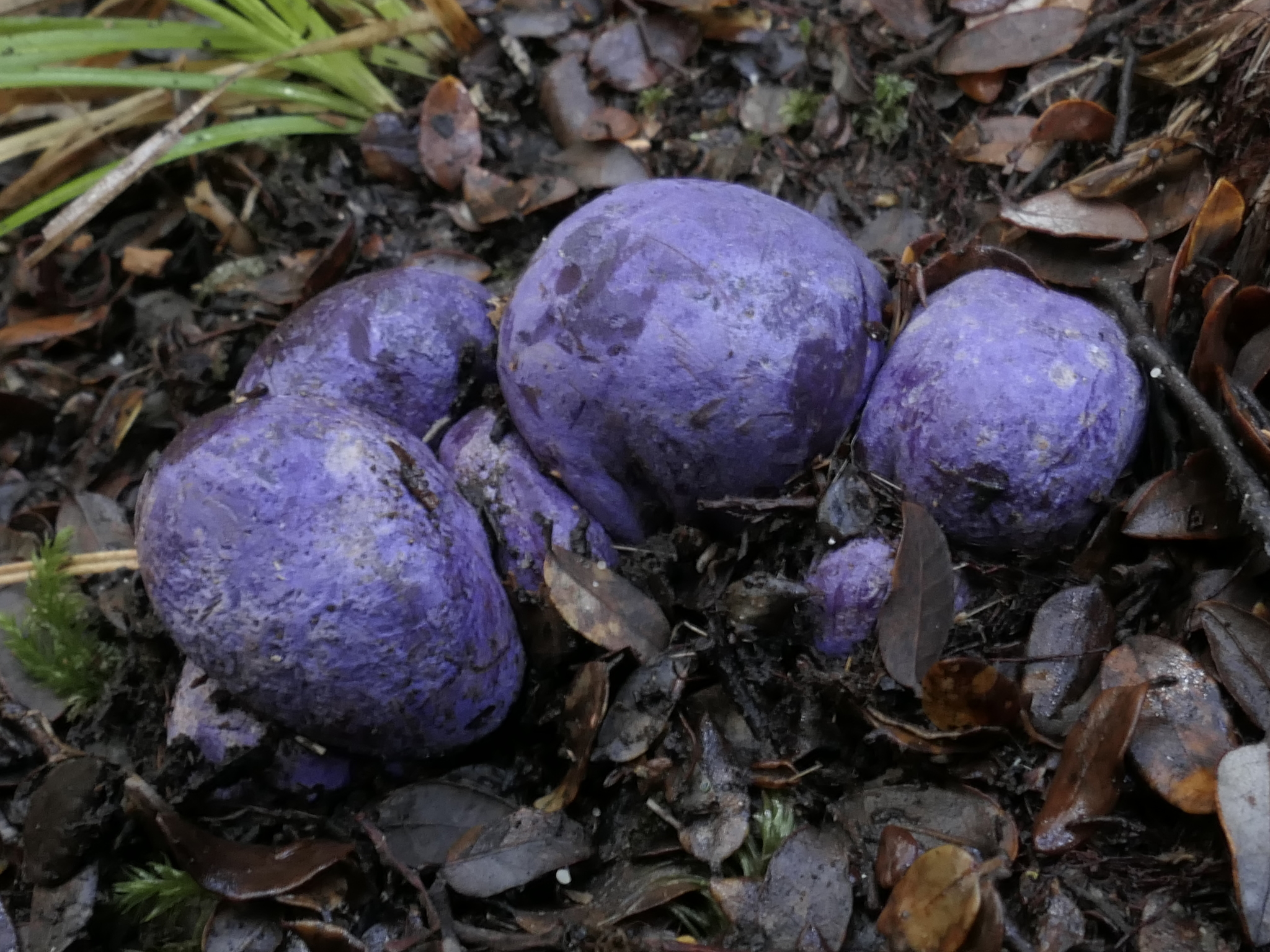

Scientific classification
- Kingdom: Fungi
- Division: Basidiomycota
- Class: Agaricomycetes
- Order: Hysterangiales
- Family: Gallaceaceae
- Genus: Gallacea
- Species: G. scleroderma

Binomial name
- Gallacea scleroderma (Cooke) Lloyd

= Gallacea scleroderma =

Species of fungus

Gallacea scleroderma, also known as the velvet potato fungus, is a truffle-like basidiomycete fungus endemic to New Zealand. This species is notable for its subterranean fruiting bodies, which resemble small, velvety tubers. It belongs to the family Gallaceaceae within the order Hysterangiales.

== Taxonomy ==
Gallacea scleroderma was circumscribed by American mycologist Curtis Gates Lloyd in 1905, The genus Gallacea was established to accommodate truffle-like fungi characterised by hypogeous fruiting bodies and thick peridia, often adapted to dry or temperate environments as the fungal species did not fit well in the existing classification of Mesophellia, especially because of Gallacea scleroderma's unique spore producing tissue.

== Description ==
Gallacea scleroderma produces underground (hypogeous) fruiting bodies that are roughly spherical to irregular in shape, and typically measure 2–5 cm (0.79–1.97 in) in diameter. The outer surface (peridium) is firm, thick, and may have a velvety texture, giving rise to its common name "velvet potato fungus." When cut open the gleba is brown to muddy brown in color. The spores are ellipsoid, smooth, and brown in color measuring approximately 10–5 micrometres (μm).

== Habitat ==
Gallacea scleroderma is endemic to New Zealand, where it is primarily found in Nothofagus forests and forms ectomycorrhizal associations with a range of southern beech trees, including N. fusca, N. menziesii, N. solandri, N. cliffortioides. These associations have been documented in multiple herbarium records across New Zealand.

A 2025 analysis of the fossilized droppings of moa confirmed that they consumed Gallacea scleroderma, and that they likely were a major disperser for the fungi.
