= Gummivena =

Scientific classification
- Domain: Eukaryota
- Kingdom: Fungi
- Division: Basidiomycota
- Class: Agaricomycetes
- Order: Hysterangiales
- Family: Mesophelliaceae
- Genus: Gummivena; Trappe & Bougher (2002)
- Species: G. potorooi

Binomial name
- Gummivena potorooi Trappe & Bougher (2002)
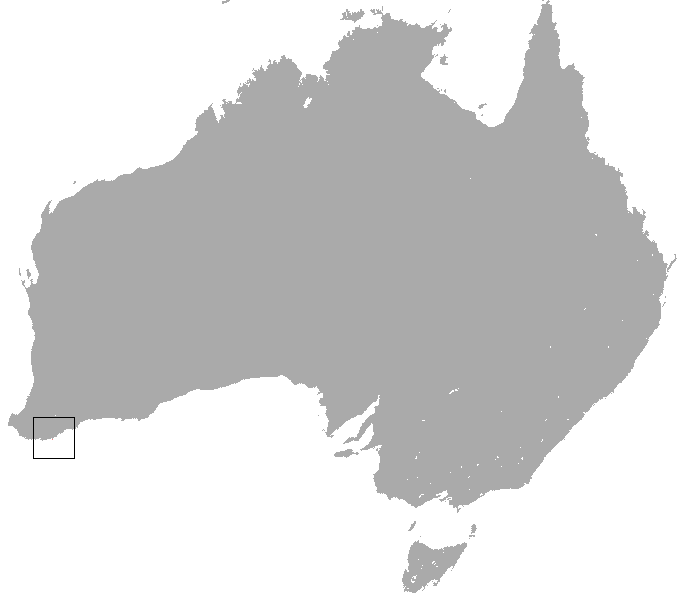
- Gummivena is found only in the range of Gilbert's potoroo in Western Australia

Genus of fungi

Gummivena is a fungal genus in the Mesophelliaceae family. The genus is monotypic, containing the single truffle-like species Gummivena potorooi, found in Western Australia. Described as new to science in 2002, Gummivena is intermediate in form between Castoreum and Gummiglobus, and has a gleba with "veins" of gummy tissue and a three-layered peridium. The specific epithet potorooi refers the fact that the fungus is found only in the range of the rare and endangered species Gilbert's potoroo (Potorous gilbertii).
