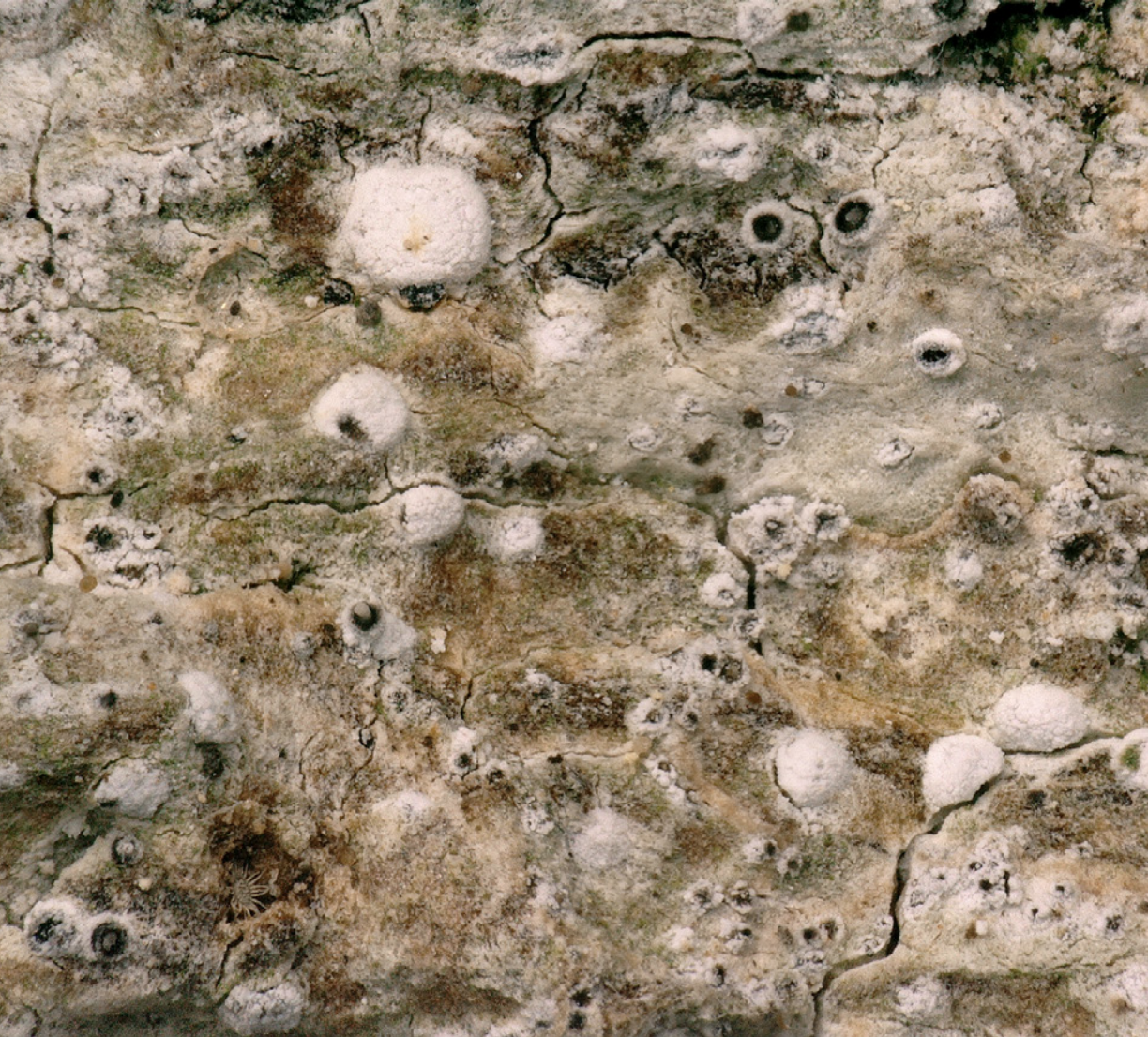
- Inoderma byssaceum, a lichen indicator of well-preserved forest sites

Scientific classification
- Kingdom: Fungi
- Division: Ascomycota
- Class: Arthoniomycetes
- Order: Arthoniales
- Family: Arthoniaceae
- Genus: Inoderma (Ach.) Gray (1821)

Type species
- Inoderma byssaceum (Weigel) Gray (1821)

Species
- I. afromontanum I. applanatum I. byssaceum I. nipponicum I. platygraphellum I. sorediatum I. subabietinum

Synonyms
- Phaeothrombis Clem. (1909); Thrombium Wallr. (1831); Verrucaria ††††† Inoderma Ach. (1810); Verrucaria sect. Inoderma (Ach.) W.Mann (1825); Wernera Zschacke ex Werner (1934); Werneromyces Werner (1976)

= Inoderma =

Genus of lichen-forming fungi

Inoderma is a genus of lichen-forming fungi in the family Arthoniaceae. First named by Erik Acharius in 1810 and formally published at genus rank by Samuel Frederick Gray in 1821, the genus was resurrected in 2015 for a small group of species characterised by elevated, white frost-like pycnidia (asexual fruiting bodies) and white-dusted apothecia (sexual fruiting bodies). These lichens typically form broad, pale whitish to light olive-grey patches on bark or other substrates, partnering with the orange-pigmented green alga Trentepohlia as their photosynthetic partner. The genus comprises seven described species, most of which are bark-dwelling lichens of long-undisturbed, old-tree woodland, including old-growth temperate forests. It has a mainly temperate distribution across the Northern Hemisphere and Australasia, with one species known from afromontane rainforest in East Africa.

== Taxonomy ==
The name Inoderma first appears in Acharius's Lichenographia Universalis (1810), where he treated it within Verrucaria as a group of "doubtful species" characterized by a cobwebby, floccose to somewhat spongy thallus (or basal felt). The name Inoderma was published at genus rank by Samuel Frederick Gray in 1821. In Gray's treatment of Inoderma (attributed to Acharius) in 1821, the genus was diagnosed as a lichen with a soft, tow-like thallus that is closely attached to the substrate and may be spongy or thin and cobwebby. He also placed weight on the form of the fruiting bodies, describing them as very small and nearly spherical, with the fertile tissue sitting low in the thallus and surrounded by a two-layered wall: an outer, thick black layer that splits above into a nipple-like opening ("mouth"), and an inner, very thin membranous layer enclosing the central spore-bearing mass.

Gray included two species, Inoderma epigea and I. byssacea, and for each he pointed back to earlier placements under Sphaeria (Persoon) and Verrucaria (Acharius). He described I. epigea as forming a thin, uneven, pale yellowish thallus with sunken, globular fruiting bodies and a prominent dark opening, occurring "on muddy ground", while I. byssacea was said to have a dirty-white, cobwebby, somewhat powdery thallus and similarly small, half-sunken fruiting bodies with a black interior, growing "on the trunks of trees". In subsequent literature, the same group was also treated under other names (for example as Verrucaria section Inoderma, or under the genera Thrombium and Phaeothrombis), which are now regarded as synonyms of Inoderma.

It was resurrected for use in 2015 for a small group of species with the following features: elevated, white pruinose pycnidia, immersed to adnate white pruinose apothecia, and a weakly gelatinized hymenium. Inoderma byssaceum was assigned as the type species for the genus. In 2024, Gintaras Kantvilas reported Inoderma from Australasia for the first time and recognised two regional species: I. applanatum (described as new) and a new combination I. platygraphellum. Species in the genus are separated using a combination of often subtle differences in apothecial and pycnidial morphology, ascospore size and septation, and thallus secondary chemistry.

== Description ==
Inoderma is a genus of lichens that typically forms broad, pale, whitish to light olive-grey patches on its substrate. These patches (the thallus) can be continuous but often develop a network of fine cracks or appear as tiny, powdery granules. The surface is usually not covered by a protective "skin" (cortex) and can feel slightly soft or powdery. The lichen's green partner cells (the photobiont) belong to Trentepohlia, a genus of green algae.

Some Inoderma species produce apothecia—small, often rounded, and slightly raised structures where spores are formed. These may lie flush with the lichen's surface or sit just above it, and they sometimes carry a thin to thick white powdery coating (pruina). The boundary between the apothecium and the main lichen body (the true exciple) is not clearly defined. Inside the apothecium, the spore-producing tissue (the hymenium) is colourless to pale yellowish-brown, with tiny pale crystals in its upper layer (the epithecium). Beneath this, the hypothecium is made of tangled fungal filaments within a jelly-like matrix, ranging in colour from pale to dark brown. Thin, thread-like structures called paraphysoids run through this layer, and their tips do not widen or darken. The asci, which are the spore-containing "sacs", follow the Arthonia-type structure. The hymenium stains blue in iodine (KI+), but the asci lack KI+ (blue) structures in the tholus. The spores are typically elongated, sometimes slightly egg-shaped (cylindric-obovoid or soleiform), and divided into two to four compartments by internal walls (septa). They remain colourless and do not narrow at the dividing lines.

In addition to apothecia, Inoderma may also form conidiomata—tiny, elevated, spore-producing bumps called pycnidia. These pycnidia have dark brown to black walls and are often dusted with a thick layer of white powder. They release small, rod-shaped spores known as conidia.

From a chemical perspective, Inoderma species may contain substances such as lepraric acid and confluentic acid, along with some compounds not yet fully identified ("byssaceum unknowns"). When tested with chemicals, the dark brown pigments in the apothecia and pycnidia turn greenish-black in the K spot test and slowly shift to an orange-brown colour when treated with nitric acid. These reactions, along with the lichen's distinct physical features and internal structures, help distinguish Inoderma from related genera.

== Habitat and distribution ==
Most species of Inoderma are corticolous crustose lichens that grow on the bark of old trees, and they are typically associated with long-undisturbed woodland, including old-growth forest and other sites with veteran trees. In Europe, I. byssaceum is strongly linked with old oaks (Quercus) in locally humid climates, while the very rare I. sorediatum occurs in deep bark crevices of large trees such as Quercus robur and Fraxinus excelsior. Inoderma subabietinum is another bark species of oceanic districts, recorded mainly on old oaks but also on other trees and woody substrates in sheltered, semi-shaded situations. In the Southern Hemisphere, I. platygraphellum occurs on the dry, fissured bark of very old trees in cool temperate rainforest and old-growth wet eucalypt forest, whereas I. applanatum is largely confined to coastal swamp woodlands in which it grows on the papery bark of Melaleuca ericifolia and, more rarely, on other bark and dead wood. The only known tropical member of the genus, I. afromontanum, grows on large-tree bark in afromontane rainforest in Uganda.

The genus has a mostly temperate distribution, with species recorded from the Northern Hemisphere, Australasia and tropical East Africa. Inoderma byssaceum is widespread across the temperate Northern Hemisphere, with documented occurrences in Europe, north-eastern North America and parts of eastern Asia, while I. nipponicum is known from Japan. Inoderma subabietinum is confined to western Europe and adjacent Atlantic islands (including Great Britain and Ireland, parts of France and the Azores, Madeira and Canary Islands). Inoderma sorediatum is known only from its type locality in north-eastern Poland. Australasia holds two species: I. applanatum is known from Tasmania and coastal Victoria, while I. platygraphellum occurs in New Zealand and has also been recorded from Tasmania, Victoria and New South Wales. Several members of the genus appear sensitive to habitat continuity, and I. byssaceum has declined in parts of Europe, where it is treated as threatened or rare and used locally as an indicator of well-preserved oak forests.

== Species ==
As of January 2026, Species Fungorum (in the Catalogue of Life) accepts six species of Inoderma; a 2024 revision treated seven species worldwide, including two recorded from Australasia.

- Inoderma afromontanum Frisch & G.Thor (2015) – Uganda
- Inoderma applanatum Kantvilas (2024)
- Inoderma byssaceum (Weigel) Gray (1821)
- Inoderma nipponicum Frisch, Y.Ohmura & G.Thor (2015) – Japan
- Inoderma platygraphellum (Nyl.) Kantvilas (2024)
- Inoderma sorediatum Ertz, Łubek & Kukwa (2018) – Poland
- Inoderma subabietinum (Coppins & P.James) Ertz & Frisch (2015) – Europe

The taxon Inoderma epigaeum (Pers.) Gray (1821) is now classified in the genus Thrombium as Thrombium epigaeum.

The name Inoderma has also been used for an unrelated, non-lichenised genus introduced by Berkeley in 1881 for gasteroid fungi (Mesophelliaceae, Basidiomycota), but this Inoderma Berk. is an illegitimate later homonym of the lichen genus Inoderma (Ach.) Gray (1821), and is treated in modern databases under Mesophellia. The name Inoderma arenarium belongs to that basidiomycete usage and has been listed as a synonym under Mesophellia arenaria in subsequent treatments; it is therefore excluded from the species list here.
