= Protubera canescens =

Scientific classification
- Kingdom: Fungi
- Division: Basidiomycota
- Class: Agaricomycetes
- Order: Hysterangiales
- Family: Phallogastraceae
- Genus: Protubera
- Species: P. canescens

Binomial name
- Protubera canescens G.W.Beaton & Malajczuk (1986)

Species of fungus

Protubera canescens is a species of truffle-like fungus in the Phallogastraceae family. It is found in Western Australia, where it grows under Eucalyptus.
