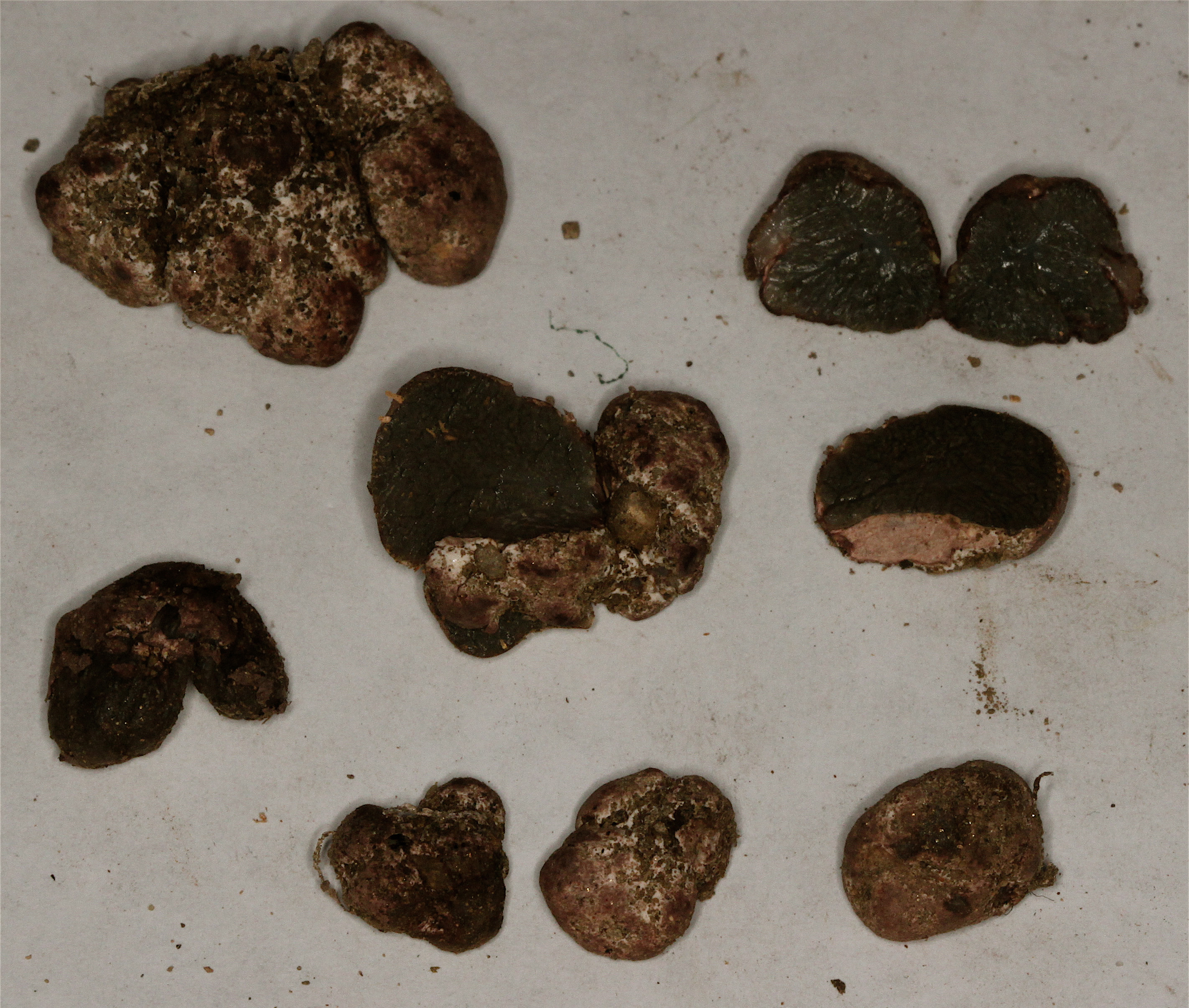
- Unidentified Trappea species

Scientific classification
- Kingdom: Fungi
- Division: Basidiomycota
- Class: Agaricomycetes
- Order: Hysterangiales
- Family: Trappeaceae
- Genus: Trappea; Castellano (1990)

Type species
- Trappea darkeri (Zeller) Castellano (1990)

= Trappea =

Genus of fungi

Trappea is a genus of truffle-like fungi in the family Trappeaceae. Species of Trappea have been found in China, Europe, and North America.

The genus was circumscribed by Michael A. Castellano in Mycotaxon vol.38 on page 2 in 1990.

The genus name of Trappea is in honour of James Martin Trappe (born 1931) is an American mycologist and expert in the field of North American truffle species.

== Species ==
As accepted by Species Fungorum;

- Trappea cinnamomea A-S. Xu & D.Q. Luo (2003)
- Trappea darkeri (Zeller) Castellano (1990)

Former species;

- T. darkeri var. lazzarii Ruini (1991) = Trappea darkeri
- T. phillipsii (Harkn.) Castellano (1990) = Phallogaster phillipsii, Phallogastraceae
- T. pinyonensis States (1991) = Phallogaster pinyonensis, Phallogastraceae
