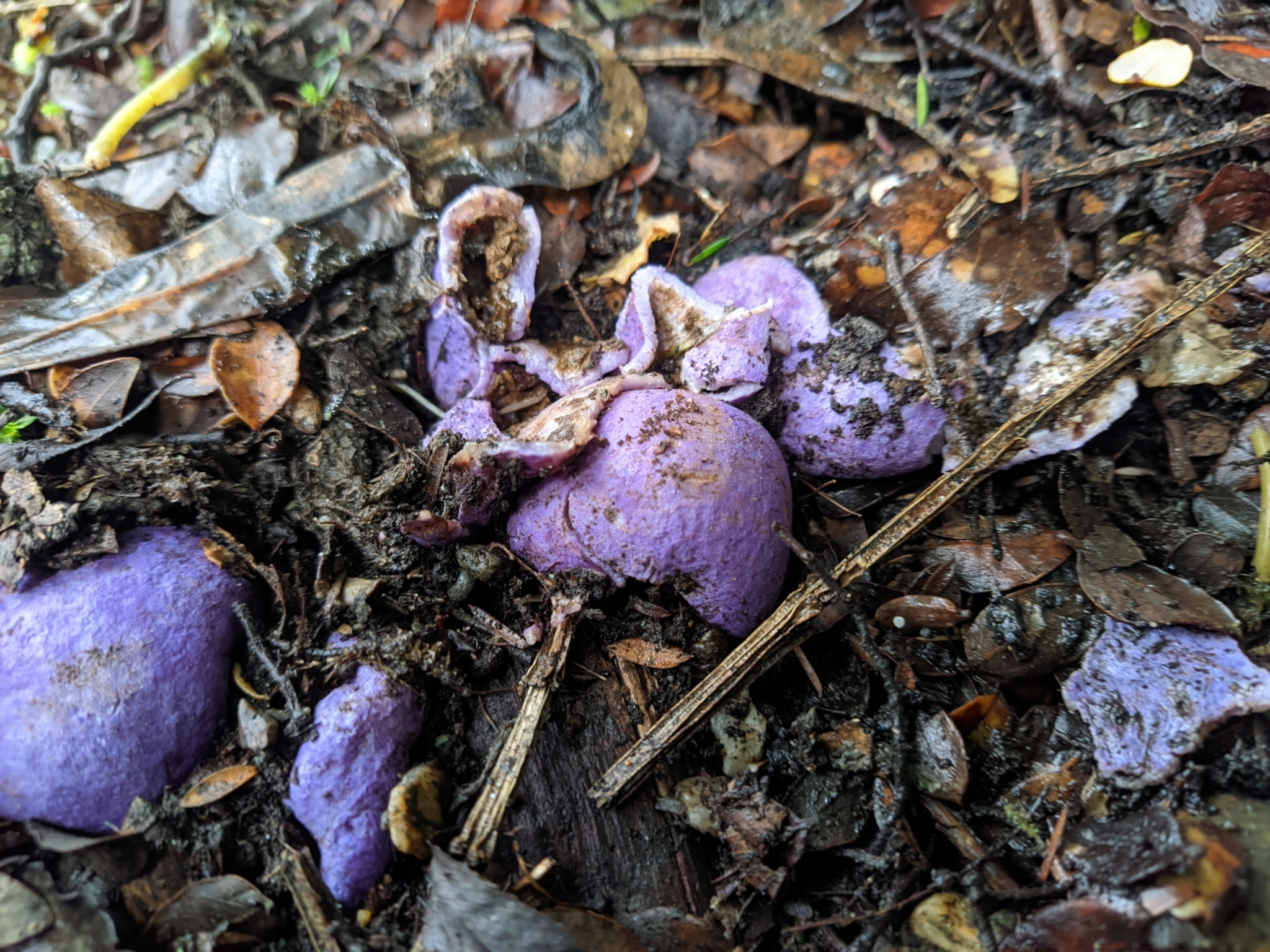
- Gallacea scleroderma

Scientific classification
- Domain: Eukaryota
- Kingdom: Fungi
- Division: Basidiomycota
- Class: Agaricomycetes
- Order: Hysterangiales
- Family: Gallaceaceae
- Genus: Gallacea; Lloyd (1905)

Type species
- Gallacea scleroderma (Cooke) Lloyd (1905)

Species
- G. avellanea G. dingleyae G. eburnea G. scleroderma G. subalpina G. violacea

= Gallacea =

Genus of fungi

Gallacea is a genus of fungi in the Gallaceaceae family. The genus contains six species found in Australia and New Zealand. Gallacea was circumscribed by American mycologist Curtis Gates Lloyd in 1905.
