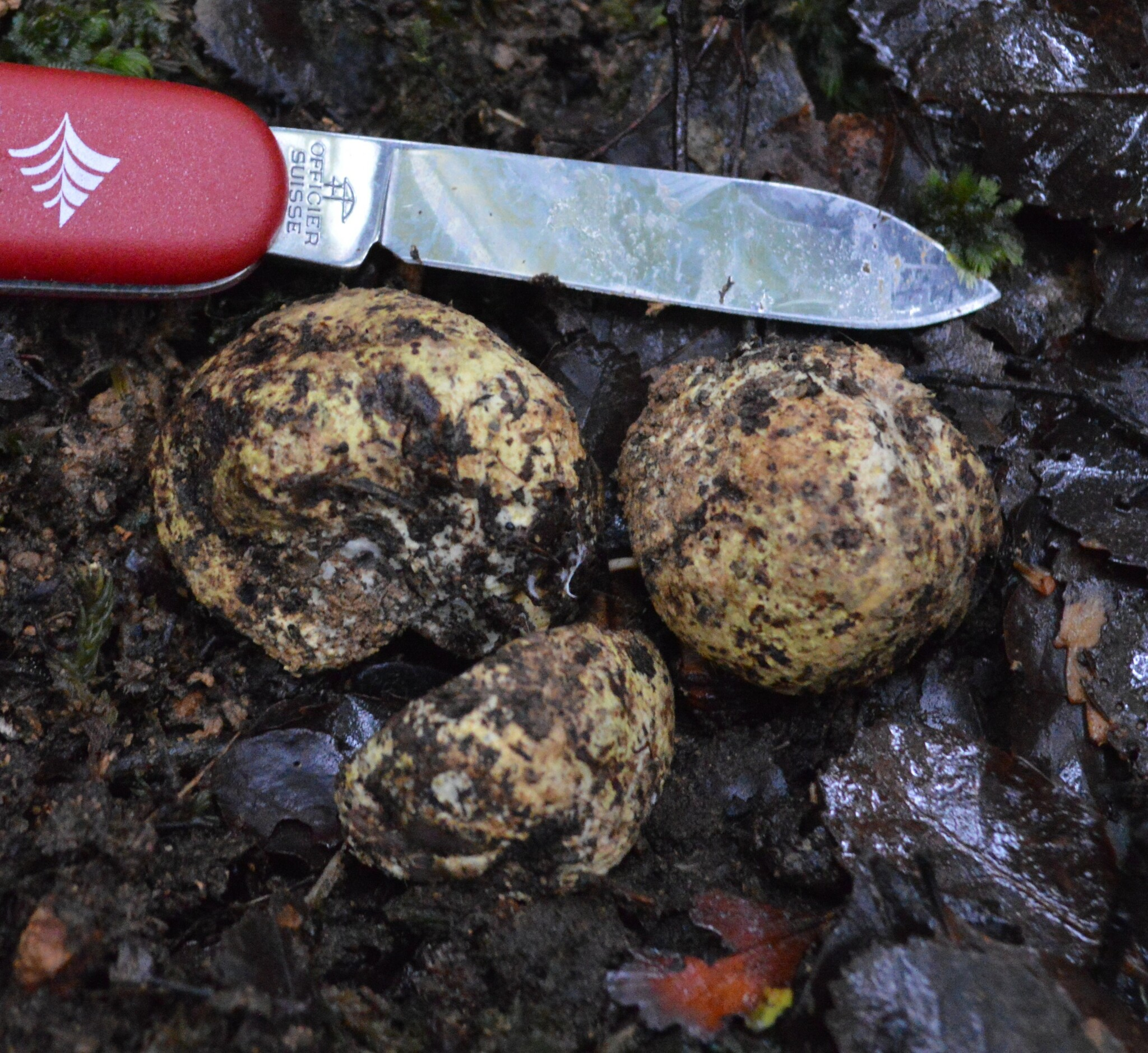

Scientific classification
- Domain: Eukaryota
- Kingdom: Fungi
- Division: Basidiomycota
- Class: Agaricomycetes
- Order: Hysterangiales
- Family: Gallaceaceae
- Genus: Austrogautieria; E.L.Stewart & Trappe (1985)

Type species
- Austrogautieria macrospora E.L.Stewart & Trappe (1985)

Species
- A. chlorospora A. clelandii A. costata A. macrospora A. manjimupana A. rodwayi

= Austrogautieria =

Genus of fungi

Austrogautieria is a genus of truffle-like fungi in the family Gallaceaceae. Segregated from the genus Gautieria in 1986, the genus contains six species found in Australia.
