= Chondrogaster =

Scientific classification
- Kingdom: Fungi
- Division: Basidiomycota
- Class: Agaricomycetes
- Order: Hysterangiales
- Family: Mesophelliaceae
- Genus: Chondrogaster; Maire (1926)

Type species
- Chondrogaster pachysporus Maire (1926)

Species
- Chondrogaster angustisporus Chondrogaster pachysporus

Genus of fungi

Chondrogaster is a genus of truffle-like fungi in the Mesophelliaceae family. The genus, described by French mycologist René Maire in 1926, contains two species, the type Chondrogaster pachysporus, and Chondrogaster angustisporus, described in 2000. Collectively, Chondrogaster is found in Mauritania, Brazil, and Europe.
