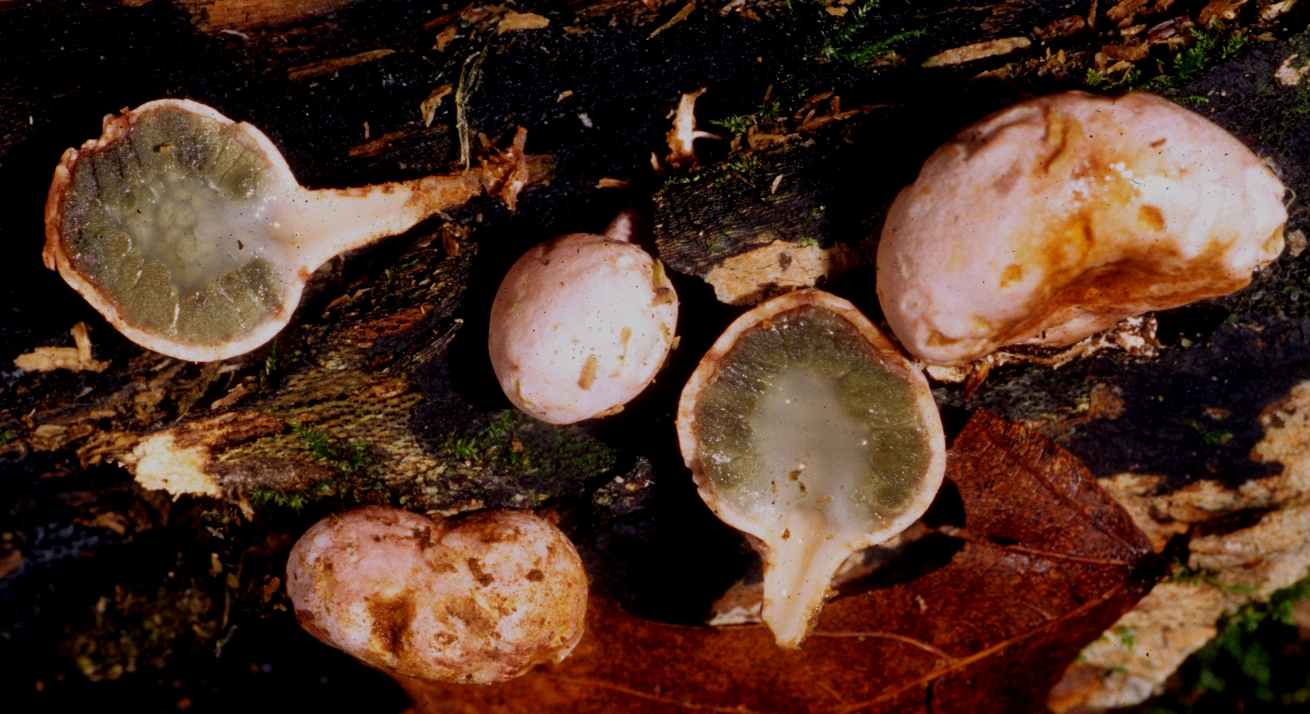
- Phallogaster saccatus

Scientific classification
- Kingdom: Fungi
- Division: Basidiomycota
- Class: Agaricomycetes
- Order: Hysterangiales
- Family: Phallogastraceae
- Genus: Phallogaster; Morgan (1893)

Type species
- Phallogaster saccatus Morgan (1893)

= Phallogaster =

Genus of fungi

Phallogaster is a fungal genus in the family Phallogastraceae. The genus is monotypic, containing the single secotioid species Phallogaster saccatus, commonly known as the club-shaped stinkhorn or the stink poke.
