= Inoderma applanatum =

Scientific classification
- Kingdom: Fungi
- Division: Ascomycota
- Class: Arthoniomycetes
- Order: Arthoniales
- Family: Arthoniaceae
- Genus: Inoderma
- Species: I. applanatum

Binomial name
- Inoderma applanatum Kantvilas (2024)
- Type locality: End of Bolduans Road, Tasmania

Species of lichen-forming fungus

Inoderma applanatum is a species of crustose lichen in the family Arthoniaceae. It forms thin, whitish-grey patches that can spread over 30 cm across on bark, with broad, flattened, reddish-brown to grey-brown fruiting bodies typically 0.5–2 mm wide. The species is known from Tasmania and coastal Victoria, where it grows mainly on the papery bark of swamp paperbark (Melaleuca ericifolia) in coastal lowland woodlands. It was described in 2024 as part of the first documentation of the genus Inoderma in Australasia.

== Taxonomy ==
Inoderma applanatum was described as a new species by Gintaras Kantvilas in 2024, in a study that documented the genus Inoderma in Australasia for the first time. The holotype was collected in northern Tasmania at the end of Bolduans Road, growing on Melaleuca ericifolia in swampy coastal woodland. The epithet applanatum refers to the strongly flattened, closely attached (adnate) apothecia.

The species was diagnosed using a combination of chemistry and microscopic characters, including the presence of the secondary metabolite 2'-O-methylperlatolic acid, mostly 2-septate (occasionally 3-septate) macrocephalic ascospores, and emergent pycnidia that can be more or less spherical to cylindrical. Kantvilas considered it most similar to Inoderma platygraphellum, but separated the two by features such as the smoother thallus and the smaller, less septate ascospores in I. applanatum; he also stated that the two occupy different habitats and have not been found growing together. The known range includes Tasmania and Victoria, based in part on Victorian herbarium material that matches I. applanatum despite having been mislabelled in the herbarium as an unrelated taxon (Arthonia nigrorufa).

== Description ==
The thallus is a thin, whitish-grey crust that spreads as diffuse patches that may exceed 30 cm across. It lacks a distinct outer cortex and prothallus, and the medulla turns pale blue in iodine (KI+); calcium oxalate was not detected. The photobiont cells occur in clumps or short chains.

The apothecia (sexual fruiting bodies) are broad and flat, typically 0.5–2 mm wide, with a reddish-brown to grey-brown disc. When young, the disc may have a thin whitish dusting (pruina) that often wears away with age, and very young apothecia can show a fine, byssoid rim of white hyphae. Under the microscope, the ascospores are clavate-ellipsoid and mostly 2-septate (occasionally 3-septate), 9–13 × 3.5–5.5 μm, remaining smooth-walled and hyaline as they mature. The pycnidia (asexual fruiting bodies) begin immersed but become emergent and sometimes distinctly cylindrical (to about 0.2 mm tall), with a black central opening. The conidia are bacilliform to ellipsoid, 3.5–6 × 1.5–2 μm. The thallus is chemically characterised by 2'-O-methylperlatolic acid and is K−, C−, P−, with a pale bluish-white UV reaction.

== Habitat and distribution ==
In Tasmania, I. applanatum is locally abundant but tied to a specialised coastal lowland habitat. It occurs mainly in swampy Melaleuca ericifolia-dominated woodlands, and also in nearby lowland eucalypt woodlands where M. ericifolia is present. It grows most often on the loose, papery bark of mature M. ericifolia trunks, forming extensive pale colonies, but it has also been recorded on rough-barked Acacia melanoxylon and on dead, decorticated eucalypt wood. The species has been recorded from Tasmania (including King Island) and from coastal Victoria (Lakes Entrance), although the Victorian specimens lack detailed ecological data.

The Tasmanian Melaleuca swamp woodlands where the species is most frequently found have been described as a distinctive, old-growth coastal vegetation community that has been heavily cleared or degraded since European settlement. Kantvilas noted that these swamps support a diverse lichen funga, including several species regarded as potentially rare or highly localised, and reported a suite of associates occurring with I. applanatum. A lichenicolous fungus, Chaenothecopsis brevipes, has also been recorded growing on the thallus of I. applanatum in Tasmania.
