= Malajczukia =

Scientific classification
- Kingdom: Fungi
- Division: Basidiomycota
- Class: Agaricomycetes
- Order: Hysterangiales
- Family: Mesophelliaceae
- Genus: Malajczukia; Trappe & Castellano (1992)

Type species
- Malajczukia viridigleba Trappe & Castellano (1992)

Species
- M. amicorum M. fusispora M. ingratissima M. karrialis M. novae-zelandiae M. spumoidea M. tropica M. viridigleba

Genus of fungi

Malajczukia is a genus of truffle-like fungi in the Mesophelliaceae family. The genus contains eight species found in Australia and New Zealand.

The genus name of Malajczukia is in honour of Nicholas Malajczuk, an Australian botanist (Mycology and Lichenology).

The genus was circumscribed by James Martin 'Jim' Trappe and Michael Angelo Castellano in Austral. Syst. Bot. vol.5 (Issue 5) on page 618 in 1992.
