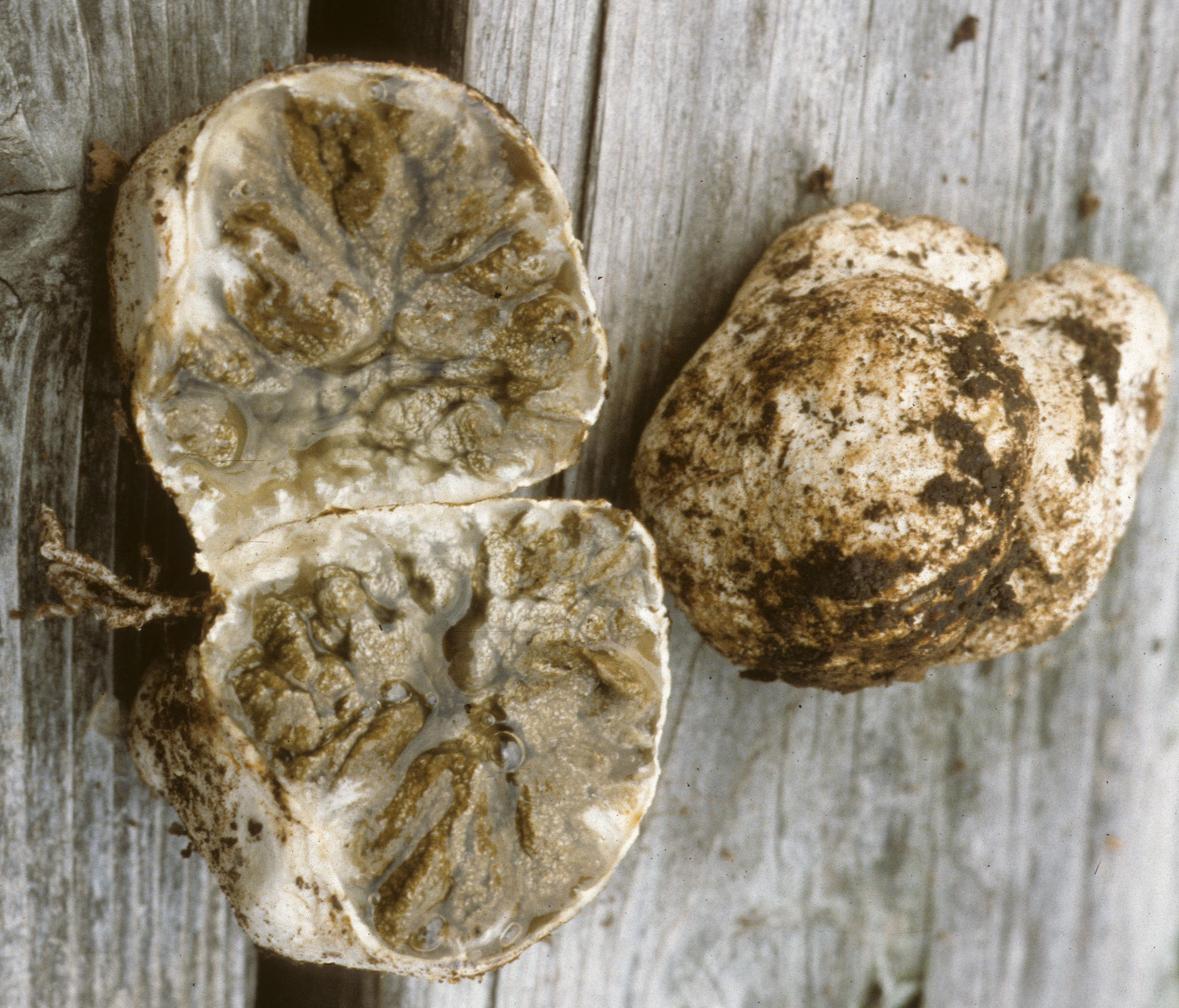
- Protubera sabulonensis

Scientific classification
- Kingdom: Fungi
- Division: Basidiomycota
- Class: Agaricomycetes
- Order: Hysterangiales
- Family: Phallogastraceae
- Genus: Protubera; Möller (1895)

Type species
- Protubera maracuja Möller (1895)

= Protubera =

Genus of fungi

Protubera is a genus of fungi in the family Phallogastraceae. The genus has a widespread distribution in tropical and subtropical areas, and contains 13 species.

== Species ==
- Protubera africana
- Protubera beijingensis
- Protubera brunnea
- Protubera burburiana
- Protubera canescens
- Protubera clathroidea
- Protubera hautuensis
- Protubera jamaicensis
- Protubera kunmingica
- Protubera maracuja
- Protubera nipponica
- Protubera nothofagi
- Protubera parvispora
- Protubera sabulonensis
- Protubera termitum
