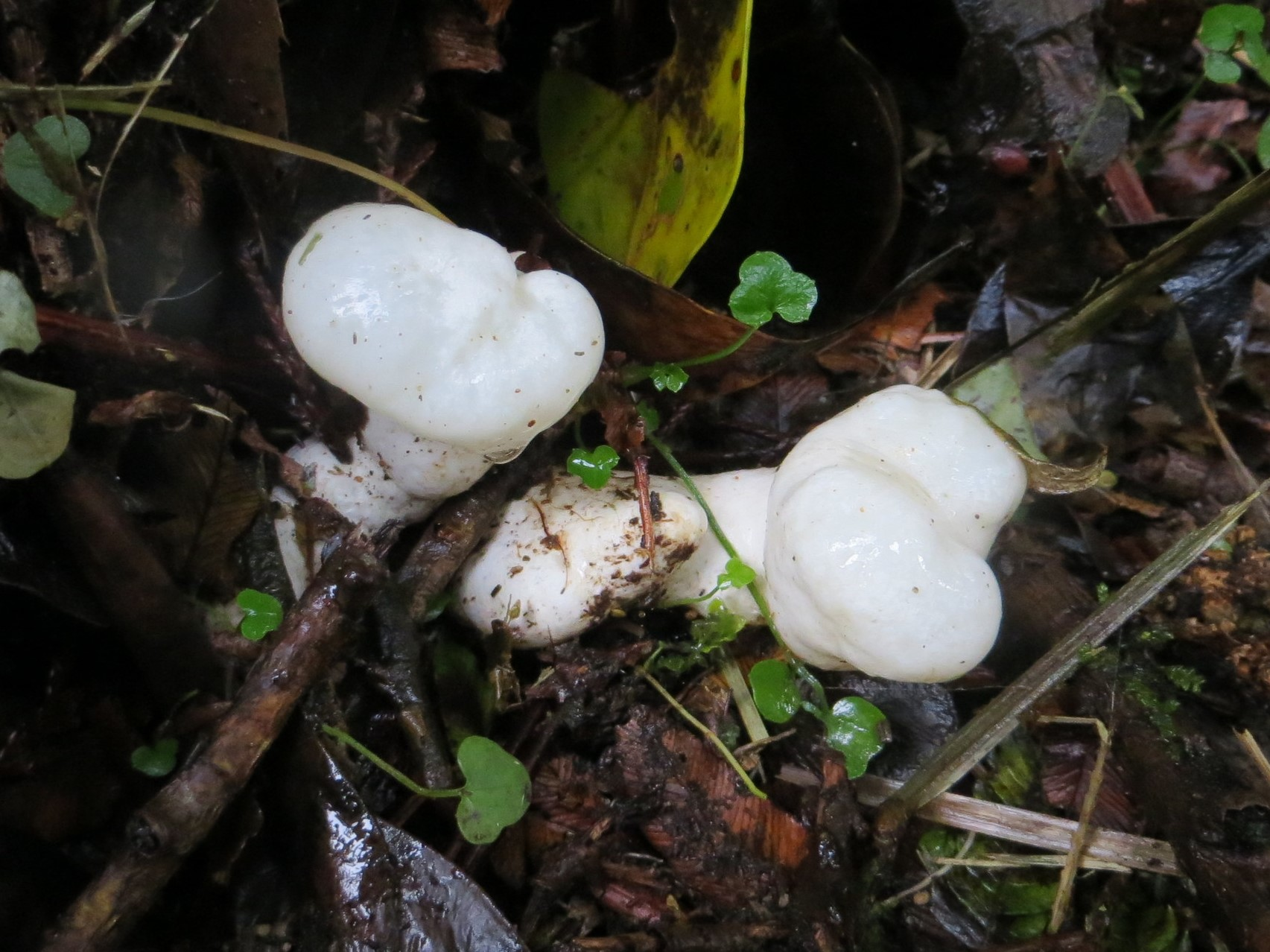

Scientific classification
- Domain: Eukaryota
- Kingdom: Fungi
- Division: Basidiomycota
- Class: Agaricomycetes
- Order: Hysterangiales
- Family: Trappeaceae
- Genus: Phallobata; G.Cunn. (1926)
- Species: P. alba

Binomial name
- Phallobata alba G.Cunn. (1926)

= Phallobata =

Genus of fungi

Phallobata is a genus of fungi in the family Trappeaceae. The genus is monotypic, containing the single truffle-like species Phallobata alba, found in Australia.
