= Nothocastoreum =

Scientific classification
- Kingdom: Fungi
- Division: Basidiomycota
- Class: Agaricomycetes
- Order: Hysterangiales
- Family: Mesophelliaceae
- Genus: Nothocastoreum; G.W.Beaton (1984)

Type species
- Nothocastoreum cretaceum (Lloyd) G.W.Beaton (1984)

Synonyms
- Diploderma cretaceum Lloyd (1921); Castoreum cretaceum (Lloyd) G.Cunn. (1932)

Genus of fungi

Nothocastoreum is a fungal genus in the Mesophelliaceae family. The genus is monotypic, containing the single truffle-like species Nothocastoreum cretaceum, found in Australia.
