= Andebbia =

Scientific classification
- Kingdom: Fungi
- Division: Basidiomycota
- Class: Agaricomycetes
- Order: Hysterangiales
- Family: Mesophelliaceae
- Genus: Andebbia; Trappe, Castellano & Amar. (1996)

Type species
- Andebbia pachythrix (Cooke & Massee) Trappe, Castellano & Amar. (1996)

Synonyms
- Diploderma pachythrix Cooke & Massee (1890); Mesophellia pachythrix (Cooke & Massee) Lloyd (1905)

Genus of fungi

Andebbia is a fungal genus in the family Mesophelliaceae. The genus is monotypic, containing the single truffle-like species Andebbia pachythrix, found in Australia.
