= Inoderma nipponicum =

Scientific classification
- Kingdom: Fungi
- Division: Ascomycota
- Class: Arthoniomycetes
- Order: Arthoniales
- Family: Arthoniaceae
- Genus: Inoderma
- Species: I. nipponicum

Binomial name
- Inoderma nipponicum Frisch, Y.Ohmura & G.Thor (2015)
- Holotype: Hikone-city, Japan

Species of lichen

Inoderma nipponicum is a species of corticolous (bark-dwelling) lichen in the family Arthoniaceae. It was formally described in 2015 from specimens collected on the bark of a large tree at Hikone Castle on Honshu, Japan. The lichen is characterised by its pale olive-grey crusty thallus and numerous conspicuous dark pycnidia (asexual fruiting bodies) that protrude from the surface and are dusted with thick white pruina. It grows on deeply fissured bark of both deciduous and coniferous trees in shady to semi-shady locations, and is known from Hokkaido and Honshu in Japan.

== Taxonomy ==
Inoderma nipponicum was described as new to science by Andreas Frisch, Yoshihito Ohmura and Göran Thor in 2015 as part of a revision resurrecting the genus Inoderma for species with elevated, white, frost-like (pruinose) asexual structures. The type specimen was collected on the trunk of a large Japanese bay tree (Machilus thunbergii) at Hikone Castle, Honshu, Japan (120 m elevation), and the name is a straightforward reference to its Japanese origin.

== Description ==
The thallus (lichen body) forms pale olive-grey patches that are fissured to fissured-areolate and lack a true outer skin (ecorticate), giving a matt, faintly felty or scurfy surface; a loose, thin necrotic layer often overlies the algal layer. The photobiont is a trentepohlioid green alga (Printzina lagenifera); cells are mostly 9–19 × 5–14 micrometres (μm), and calcium oxalate crystals were not seen in the type material.

Sexual fruiting bodies (apothecia) were sparse and under-developed in the type material. When present they are small rounded discs, 0.4–0.6 mm in diameter, set level with the thallus and covered in a thin white pruina (a frost-like powder). Internally the tissues and spore-bearing layer match the Arthonia-type; ascospores are hyaline, narrowly obovate, typically 3–4-septate (rarely 2) and measure about 13–16 × 3–4 μm.

Asexual fruiting bodies (pycnidia) are numerous and conspicuous: dark brown to black cups 0.25–0.50 mm across that protrude strongly or sit with a constricted base on the thallus, their rims and shoulders dusted with thick white pruina. The pore is entire to ragged, and the interior shows a bowl-shaped cavity; the wall is strongly carbonised at the sides. Conidiogenous cells are 9–11 × 1.5–3.0 μm and produce bacilliform conidia that are often slightly curved, with dimensions averaging around 4.9 × 1.3 μm.

Chemically, the species contains lepraric acid. In routine spot tests the thallus and the white pruina turn K+ (lemon yellow), a diagnostic reaction for this compound, and are C−, KC−, Pd−; the thallus hyphae are I− but KI+ (pale blue).

=== Similar species ===
Within Inoderma, I. nipponicum is most similar to I. subabietinum but differs consistently in lacking confluentic acid and in pycnidial traits: older pycnidia do not develop outwardly reflexed rims and carry a fine, mealy pruina rather than a coarse, granular one; its asexual spores (conidia) are often very slightly curved. Sterile material of I. byssaceum can appear similar, but that species has a K− thallus and pycnidia (no yellow reaction in the standard K test) and conidia that are a bit shorter and not weakly curved.

== Habitat and distribution ==
Inoderma nipponicum occurs below about 500 m elevation in shady to semi-shady situations. It grows mainly on deeply fissured or flaky bark of both deciduous and coniferous hosts, including Acer buergerianum, Machilus thunbergii, Picea sp., Pinus densiflora and Torreya nucifera; a small saxicolous collection was also made on rain-shadowed castle walls at Hikone. The species appears tolerant of drier conditions and of urban air, occurring in parkland as well as in old-growth forest. Confirmed records are from Japan (Hokkaidō and Honshū).
