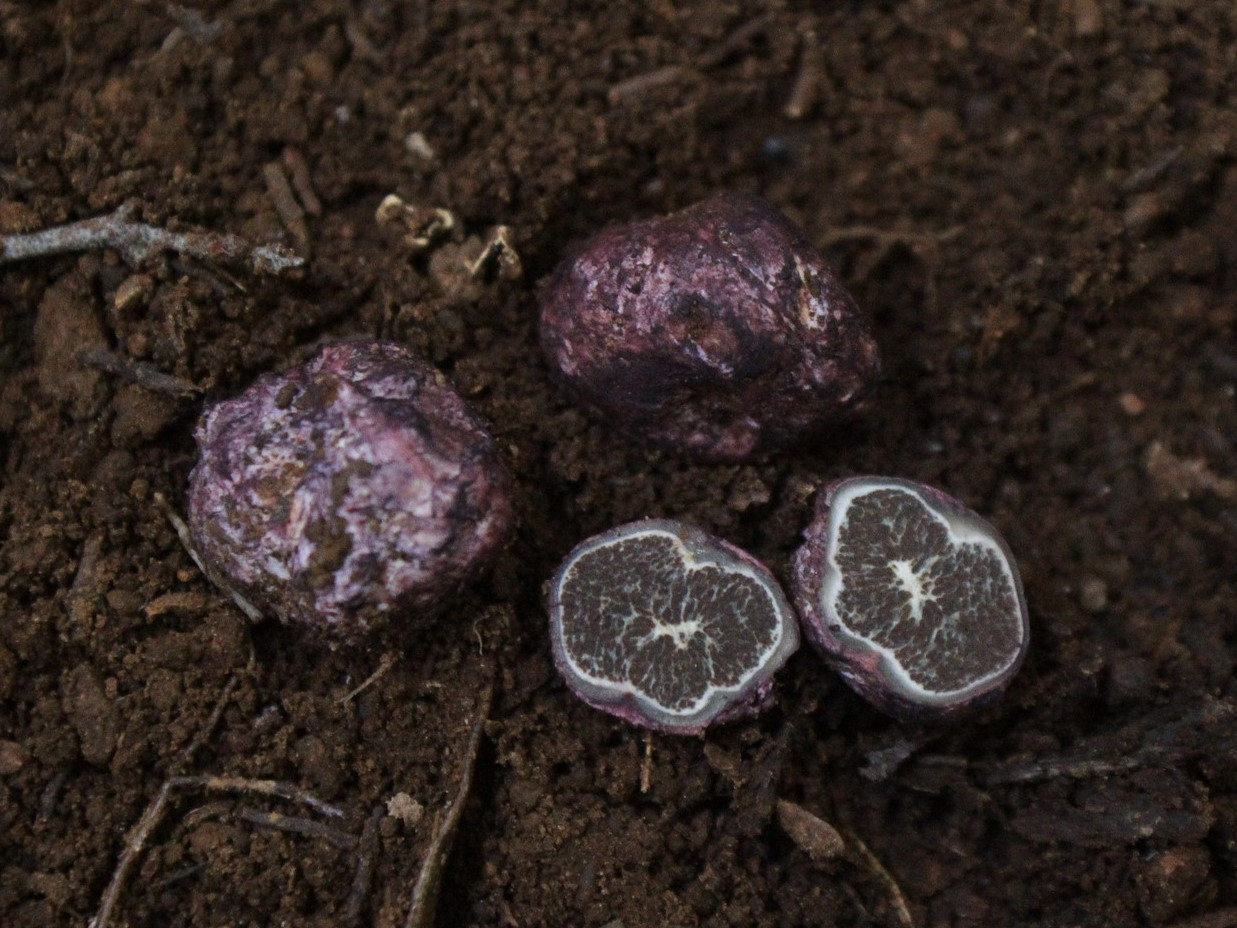

Scientific classification
- Domain: Eukaryota
- Kingdom: Fungi
- Division: Basidiomycota
- Class: Agaricomycetes
- Order: Hysterangiales
- Family: Gallaceaceae
- Genus: Hallingea; Castellano (1996)

Type species
- Hallingea purpurea (Zeller & C.W.Dodge) Castellano (1996)

Species
- H. carneorosea; H. purpurea; H. violacea

= Hallingea =

Genus of fungi

Hallingea is a genus of fungi in the family Gallaceaceae. It contains three species found in South America.
