= Inoderma platygraphellum =

Scientific classification
- Kingdom: Fungi
- Division: Ascomycota
- Class: Arthoniomycetes
- Order: Arthoniales
- Family: Arthoniaceae
- Genus: Inoderma
- Species: I. platygraphellum

Binomial name
- Inoderma platygraphellum (Nyl.) Kantvilas (2024)

Synonyms
- Arthonia platygraphella Nyl. (1867); Schismatomma platygraphellum (Nyl.) Zahlbr. (1923)

Species of lichen-forming fungus

Inoderma platygraphellum is a species of crustose lichen in the family Arthoniaceae. It forms whitish to whitish-grey patches with a scurfy or cottony texture, spreading into diffuse colonies up to 30 cm or more across on bark. The species occurs in New Zealand and eastern Australia, where it grows on the fissured bark of old trees in cool temperate rainforest and old-growth wet eucalypt forest. It was originally described as Arthonia platygraphella in 1867 and transferred to Inoderma in 2024.

== Taxonomy ==
Inoderma platygraphellum was originally described by William Nylander in 1867 as Arthonia platygraphella, based on material collected on Podocarpus totara bark near Dunedin, New Zealand. It was later combined in Schismatomma by Alexander Zahlbruckner, and in 2024 Gintaras Kantvilas transferred it to Inoderma as a new combination, Inoderma platygraphellum. The lectotype is a New Zealand specimen from Otago (Green Island Bush) collected by William Lauder Lindsay in 1861.

Kantvilas discussed the species in the context of the genus as a whole, noting its close resemblance to the Northern Hemisphere species Inoderma byssaceum. Although the two can look similar, he treated them as distinct, citing differences in chemistry and the consistently broader apothecia of I. platygraphellum, along with differences seen in young asci. In earlier, mainly ecological treatments of Tasmanian lichens, this taxon had been tentatively misapplied to Arthonia cinereopruinosa, a different species that is not present in Tasmania.

== Description ==
The lichen forms an ecorticate, whitish to whitish-grey crust (the thallus), sometimes with a faint bluish tinge, typically with a roughened surface and patches of byssoid (cottony) texture. It can spread into diffuse colonies 30 cm or more across, and the medulla stains pale blue with iodine (KI+). The photobiont occurs in chains, with cells about 12–22 × 8–16 μm.

Its apothecia (sexual fruiting bodies) are broad and closely attached to the thallus, often merging into irregular clusters. The disc is grey-brown to grey and is usually covered by a thick, whitish pruina. Microscopically, the hymenium is KI+ (blue) and the ascospores are clavate-ellipsoid, usually 3–4-septate (sometimes 2-septate), macrocephalic, and about 13–18 × 5–7 μm. Pycnidia (asexual fruiting bodies) are immersed to semi-immersed and spherical, with a black opening that becomes gaping with age. The conidia are bacilliform, measuring 4.5–7 × 1–1.5 μm. Chemically, the thallus contains 2'-O-methylperlatolic acid and is K−, KC−, C−, P−, with a pale creamish-white UV reaction.

Kantvilas separated I. platygraphellum from the other Australasian species, Inoderma applanatum, by its roughened-byssoid thallus, more convex and more heavily pruinose apothecia, larger and more septate ascospores, and its at most semi-immersed, spherical pycnidia. In Tasmanian material, calcium oxalate was consistently detected, but it was not observed in the mainland Australian specimens examined or in the New Zealand type specimen.

== Habitat and distribution ==
The species was first described from New Zealand and has been treated there as widely distributed. Kantvilas also recorded it from Australia (Tasmania, Victoria, and New South Wales), where it is an occasional epiphyte on the dry, fissured bark of very old trees, usually in shaded and sheltered situations in cool temperate rainforest and old-growth wet eucalypt forest. One collection was unusual in being from dolerite in a deeply shaded cleft within eucalypt forest.

Australian specimens cited in the paper span multiple regions of Tasmania (including the Central Highlands, East Coast, and South West), as well as localities in Victoria and the Barrington Tops area of New South Wales. The typical habitat is described as lichen-rich old-tree bark, and Kantvilas listed several frequent associates with similar preferences for long-undisturbed forest, including species of Chaenotheca and Chaenothecopsis, Cliostomum griffithii, Lecanactis abietina, Lecanactis mollis, and Micarea prasinastra. A lichenicolous fungus, Chaenothecopsis brevipes, has also been recorded in Tasmania on thalli of I. platygraphellum.
