= Inoderma subabietinum =

Scientific classification
- Kingdom: Fungi
- Division: Ascomycota
- Class: Arthoniomycetes
- Order: Arthoniales
- Family: Arthoniaceae
- Genus: Inoderma
- Species: I. subabietinum

Binomial name
- Inoderma subabietinum (Coppins & P.James) Ertz & Frisch (2015)

Synonyms
- Lecanactis subabietina Coppins & P.James (1979)

Species of lichen-forming fungus

Inoderma subabietinum is a species of corticolous (bark-dwelling) crustose lichen in the family Arthoniaceae. Originally described in 1979 as Lecanactis subabietina from south Devon, England, it was transferred to the genus Inoderma in 2015 on the basis of DNA evidence. The species forms whitish to pale olivaceous-grey patches on bark. It is recognized by numerous dark brown to black, cup-shaped asexual fruiting bodies (pycnidia) coated in a thick, granular, white, frost-like powder. It is a strongly oceanic lichen (associated with Atlantic climates) typically found on old oaks in sheltered, semi-shaded sites, with records from Great Britain, Ireland, France, and from Atlantic islands including the Azores, Madeira and the Canary Islands.

== Taxonomy ==
The lichen now treated as Inoderma subabietinum was described as a new species in 1979 by Brian John Coppins and Peter James under the name Lecanactis subabietina, with the type specimen collected in south Devon (Slapton Ley) on Quercus bark and deposited in BM herbarium. The original description characterised it as a mostly sterile crust: apothecia (sexual fruiting bodies) were unknown. It was recognised mainly from its numerous pycnidia (asexual fruiting bodies) and the features of their conidia, along with its chemistry (including confluentic and lepraric acids) and a K+ (lemon-yellow) reaction of the white pruina on the pycnidia. It can be confused with Lecanactis abietina and Opegrapha vermicellifera, but it differs in the strongly expanded pycnidia and in diagnostic measurements and spot-test reactions. Some material previously identified as O. vermicellifera was reassigned to the new species.

A 2015 revision resurrected Inoderma, with I. byssaceum selected as the type species, for a small group of species with raised pycnidia coated in a white, frost-like pruina (pruinose) and apothecia that are partly immersed to attached (adnate) and also white-pruinose, with a spore layer that is only weakly gelatinised (jelly-like). Inoderma is placed in the cryptothecioid lineage within Arthoniaceae. Lecanactis subabietina had been placed in Roccellaceae on superficial similarity to Lecanactis abietina and because it contains lepraric acid, but DNA data place it in Arthoniaceae, close to I. byssaceum, and Lecanactis abietina differs in chemistry, conidial size, and ascomatal features.

== Description ==
The thallus (lichen body) forms extensive, whitish to pale olivaceous-grey patches that may remain continuous or crack into small, angular plates (areoles). It lacks a true outer cortex (it is ecorticate), giving it a matt, faintly scurfy, minutely granular appearance. In cross-section it is thin (to about 0.12 mm) and partly sunk into the outer bark. The photobiont is a Trentepohlia-type (trentepohlioid) green alga. Its cells mostly measure 7–15 × 4–13 μm. Calcium oxalate crystals were not observed. Sexual fruiting bodies (apothecia) are unknown.

Asexual fruiting bodies (pycnidia) are numerous and conspicuous: dark brown to black, cup-shaped structures 0.20–0.45 mm across. Their rims and upper sides are coated in a thick, coarsely granular white pruina (a frost-like powder). The opening ranges from narrow to widely gaping, and the rim is often strongly reflexed (curved backwards). In cross-section the cavity is bowl-shaped to wedge-shaped (about 100–300 μm wide) and may be divided by thin internal septa; the wall is carbonised. Conidia are rod-shaped (bacilliform), usually 4.2–5.8 × 1.1–1.5 μm (rarely up to 7.0 × 1.7 μm; mean about 5.0 × 1.3 μm). Chemically the species contains confluentic and lepraric acids. In spot tests, the thallus and pycnidial pruina are K+ (lemon yellow), but C−, KC− and Pd−; the thallus hyphae are I+ and KI+ (pale blue). The crystal layer of the pycnidia dissolves in K (potassium hydroxide; yellowish solution) and in lactic-cotton blue, but not in sulphuric acid.

== Habitat and distribution ==
Inoderma subabietinum is a strongly oceanic lichen (associated with Atlantic climates) of dry, acidic substrates, usually found in sheltered situations that are semi-shaded rather than deeply shaded. It is most often recorded on the bark of old oaks (Quercus), but it has also been found on Betula, Pinus and Hedera. More occasional records are from Calluna stems and decaying fern fronds in sheltered sites. It can grow alongside other oceanic bark lichens such as Arthonia impolita, Diploicia canescens, Enterographa crassa, Lepraria incana, Schismatomma decolorans and Chaenotheca hispidula. The similar Opegrapha vermicellifera tends to occur in shadier conditions and on less acidic, more nutrient-rich bark, for example on Acer pseudoplatanus and Ulmus.

In Great Britain it is considered easily overlooked and has been recorded mainly from southern, oceanic areas. Confirmed records include Great Britain and Ireland, France (including Brittany), and the Atlantic island groups (archipelagos) of the Azores, Madeira and the Canary Islands.
