= Gummiglobus =

Scientific classification
- Kingdom: Fungi
- Division: Basidiomycota
- Class: Agaricomycetes
- Order: Hysterangiales
- Family: Mesophelliaceae
- Genus: Gummiglobus; Trappe, Castellano & Amar. (1996)

Type species
- Gummiglobus joyceae Trappe, Castellano & Amar. (1996)

Species
- G. agglutinosporus G. joyceae

Genus of fungi

Gummiglobus is a genus of truffle-like fungi in the Mesophelliaceae family. The genus contains two Australian species described as new to science in 1996. The species, G. agglutinosporus and G. joyceae, "have columellae with wedge-shaped to digitate or strand-like projections that extend to the endocutis of the peridium and are embedded in a remarkable gummy tissue".
