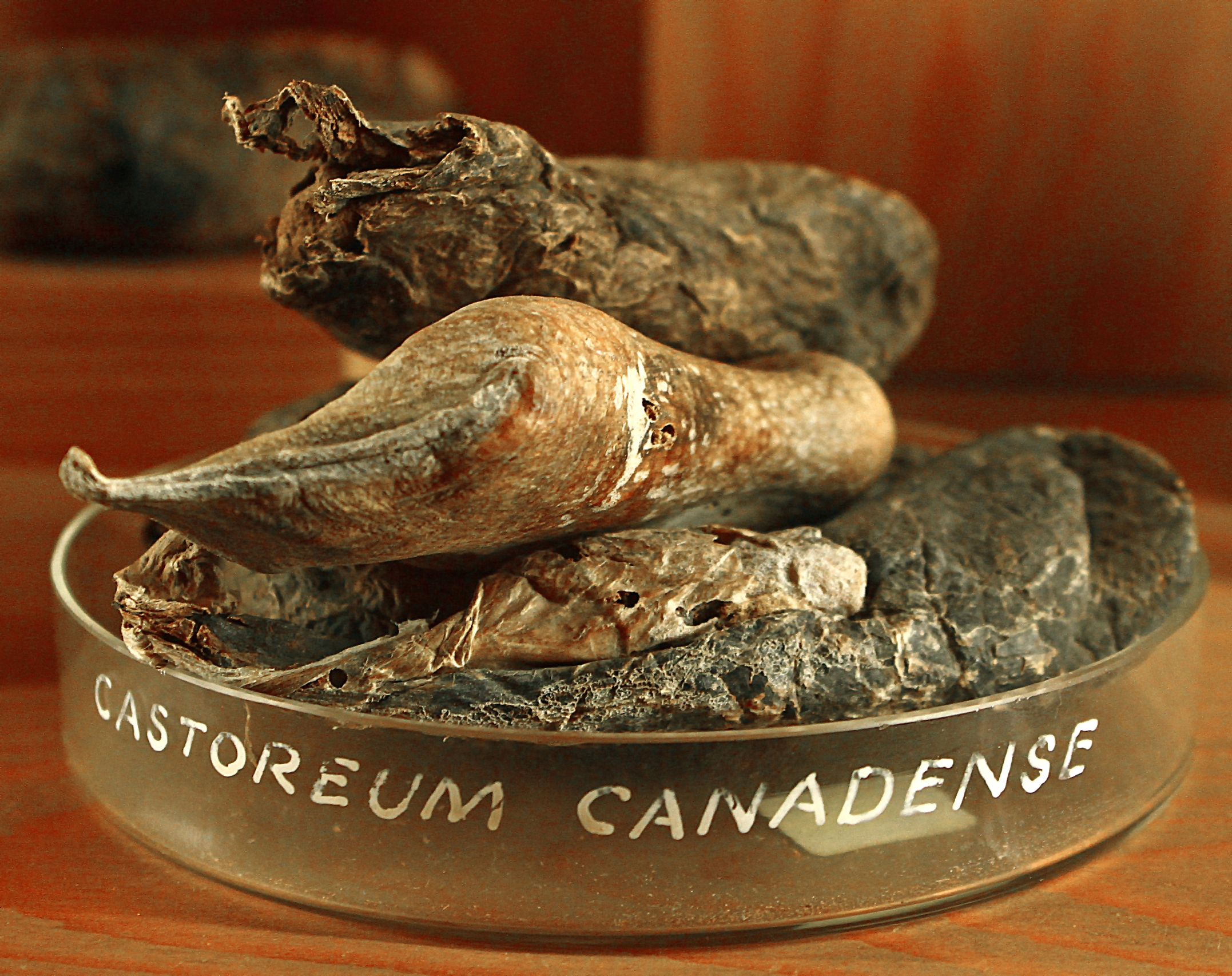

Scientific classification
- Kingdom: Fungi
- Division: Basidiomycota
- Class: Agaricomycetes
- Order: Hysterangiales
- Family: Mesophelliaceae
- Genus: Castoreum; Cooke & Massee (1887)

Type species
- Castoreum radicatum Cooke & Massee (1887)

Species
- C. camphoratum C. radicatum C. tasmanicum

= Castoreum (fungus) =

Genus of fungi

Castoreum is a genus of truffle-like fungi in the Mesophelliaceae family. The genus, circumscribed by English mycologists Mordecai Cubitt Cooke and George Edward Massee in 1887, contains three species found in Australia.
