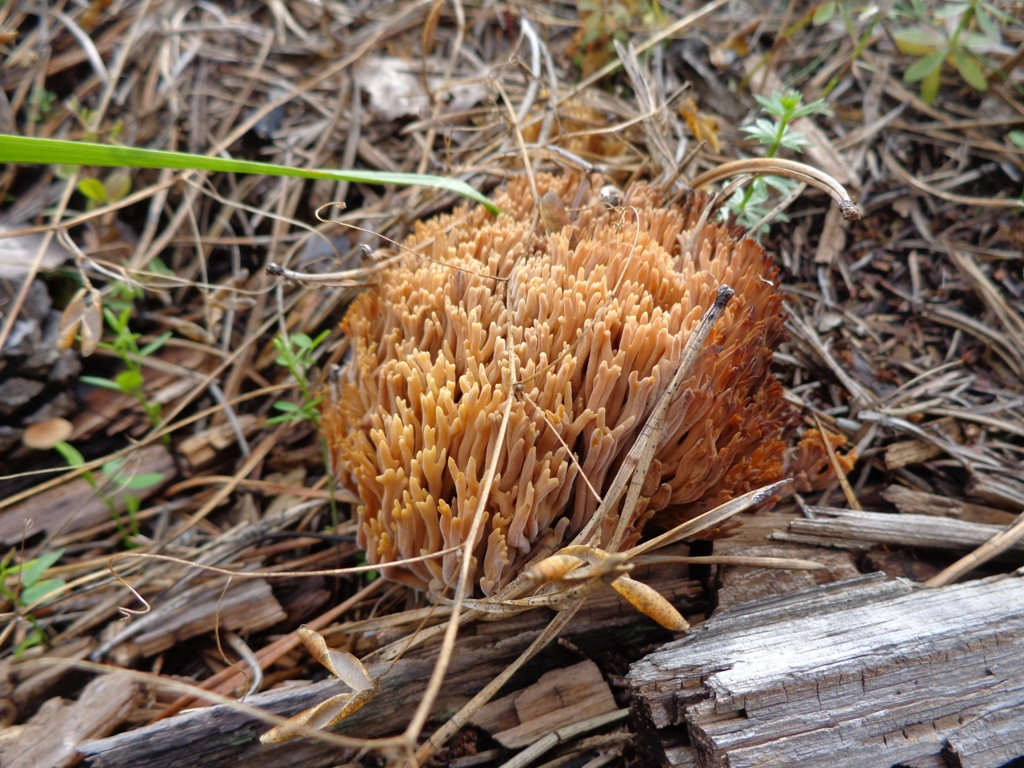
- Ramaria flavescens

Scientific classification
- Domain: Eukaryota
- Kingdom: Fungi
- Division: Basidiomycota
- Class: Agaricomycetes
- Subclass: Phallomycetidae; K. Hosaka, Castellano & Spatafora, 2007

Orders
- Geastrales; Gomphales; Hysterangiales; Phallales

= Phallomycetidae =

Subclass of fungi

Phallomycetidae is a subclass of the class Agaricomycetes of fungi.
