= Inoderma afromontanum =

Scientific classification
- Kingdom: Fungi
- Division: Ascomycota
- Class: Arthoniomycetes
- Order: Arthoniales
- Family: Arthoniaceae
- Genus: Inoderma
- Species: I. afromontanum

Binomial name
- Inoderma afromontanum Frisch & G.Thor (2015)
- Holotype: Buhoma, Uganda

Species of lichen

Inoderma afromontanum is a species of corticolous (bark-dwelling) crustose lichen in the family Arthoniaceae. Found in Uganda's Bwindi Impenetrable National Park, it was described from specimens collected in the park's montane rainforest. It is distinguished by its conspicuous dark pycnidia (asexual fruiting bodies) with white frost-like coating and its simple chemistry. I. afromontanum is the only known tropical member of the genus Inoderma, which otherwise consists of temperate species.

== Taxonomy ==
Inoderma afromontanum was formally described as new to science in 2015 by Andreas Frisch and Göran Thor as part of a revision that resurrected the genus Inoderma for a small group of species characterised by elevated, white, frost-edged (pruinose) asexual structures and pallid, pruinose sexual structures. The specific epithet refers to its afromontane rainforest habitat. The holotype was collected on rough bark along the Waterfall Trail near Buhoma in Bwindi Impenetrable National Park, south-western Uganda, at 1,600–1,700 m elevation. The paper's phylogenetic analyses place Inoderma within the cryptothecioid subclade of family Arthoniaceae.

Within the genus, I. afromontanum is set apart by its chemistry and morphology. It contains 2'-O-methylperlatolic acid as its only detected secondary metabolite (the usual quick spot tests on the thallus and pruina are negative), has small ascospores with three septa, and shows pale rather than dark brown tissue beneath the spore layer in the fruiting bodies. It differs from the temperate I. byssaceum by its chemistry and by having immersed, only slightly convex apothecia with often lobed margins; it differs from I. subabietinum and I. nipponicum in a combination of chemistry and pycnidial details.

== Description ==
The thallus (the lichen body) forms extensive, pale olivaceous-grey patches that can look matt, scurfy, or minutely granular; the surface lacks a true outer skin (it is ecorticate). The photosynthetic partner is a trentepohlioid green alga, with cells mostly 7–18 × 5–12 μm. A thin dark prothallus line may mark contact with neighbouring lichens. No calcium oxalate crystals were observed in the thallus.

Sexual fruiting bodies (apothecia) are small discs 0.5–0.8 mm across that sit level with or just above the thallus and are dusted with a thin white pruina (a frost-like powder). They are pale brown to brown and often broadly lobed. Internally, the spore-bearing layer is only moderately gelatinised; the tissue below it (hypothecium) is pale, and the asci are of the Arthonia-type. Ascospores are hyaline, narrowly obovate, with three cross-walls (3-septate), typically 8–10 × 3.5–4.0 μm, and have a slightly enlarged end cell. Standard iodine tests give coloured reactions in the gels of the fruiting body (I+ red; KI+ blue).

Asexual fruiting bodies (pycnidia) are numerous and conspicuous: dark brown to black cups 0.30–0.45 mm across that protrude from the thallus, their rims and shoulders coated in a white pruina. The opening is usually ragged and gaping. Inside, the wall is dark brown and the cavity is bowl- to cone-shaped, often partitioned by thin internal septa. The pycnidia produce abundant bacilliform conidia (asexual spores) that are about 3.7–5.1 × 1.1–1.7 μm. The species' chemistry is simple: 2'-O-methylperlatolic acid is present, while routine spot tests on the thallus and pruina are negative (K−, C−, KC−, Pd−).

== Habitat and distribution ==
Inoderma afromontanum is a tropical African species restricted to montane rainforest in Bwindi Impenetrable National Park, Uganda. It is rather common there between about 1,600 and 2,400 m and grows on the smooth to deeply fissured bark of large trees in mixed evergreen forest. Recorded substrates include Chrysophyllum albidum, Drypetes ugandensis and Leptonichia mildbraedii. As of its original description, it is the only Inoderma known from tropical latitudes. Localities documented span both the western (Buhoma) and eastern (Ruhija) sectors of the park.
