= Inoderma sorediatum =

Scientific classification
- Kingdom: Fungi
- Division: Ascomycota
- Class: Arthoniomycetes
- Order: Arthoniales
- Family: Arthoniaceae
- Genus: Inoderma
- Species: I. sorediatum

Binomial name
- Inoderma sorediatum Ertz, Łubek & Kukwa (2018)

Species of lichen

Inoderma sorediatum is a species of crustose lichen in the family Arthoniaceae. It is only known to occur on the bark of trees in Poland's Białowieża National Park. It is differentiated from other species in genus Inoderma by the form of its thallus, which is entirely made of powdery, granular soredia (vegetative propagules), as well as by the presence of a unique combination of lichen products.

== Taxonomy ==
Inoderma sorediatum was formally described as a new species in 2018 by Damien Ertz, Anna Łubek, and Martin Kukwa. The type specimen was collected by the second and third authors from Białowieża National Park (Białowieża Forest, Równina Bielska). Molecular phylogenetic analysis established its classification in genus Inoderma. The species epithet alludes to its characteristic sorediate thallus.

== Description ==
The crustose thallus of Inoderma sorediatum is about 1–2 cm (0.4–0.8 in) in diameter and up to 1 mm thick. Fresh individuals are pinkish, but specimens become white or yellowish after storage in a herbarium. The crust is made of soredia, which individually measure 20–35 μm in diameter. The photobiont partner of the lichen is trentepohlioid (i.e., filamentous, multicellular green algae from genus Trentepohlia). The algal cells contain an orange pigment that refracts in polarized light. The algal cells are spherical and measure 10––21 μm in diameter; they occur either singly or in short chains of 2–6 individuals, with adjacent cells becoming more ellipsoidal or rectangular in shape. Inoderma sorediatum is a sterile lichen, meaning it does not produce ascomata, nor ascospores. In rare instances, it has been recorded with pycnidia, which measure 170–280 μm and have a dark brown wall. The conidia are bacilliform in shape, and measure 3.5–5.0 by 1.1–1.3 μm.

The species contains confluentic acid and 2'-O-methylperlatolic acid, which are lichen products that can be detected using thin-layer chromatography. Inoderma sorediatum is the only member of genus Inoderma to contain both of these substances.

== Habitat and distribution ==
Inoderma sorediatum grows in the deep bark crevices of large trees (both living and dead), usually Quercus robur, but also Fraxinus excelsior. Other lichen species growing in close association include Chaenotheca chrysocephala, Chaenothecopsis cf. savonica, Chrysothrix candelaris, Lepraria spp., Opegrapha vermicellifera, and Reichlingia leopoldii. Inoderma sorediatum is only known to occur at the type locality.
