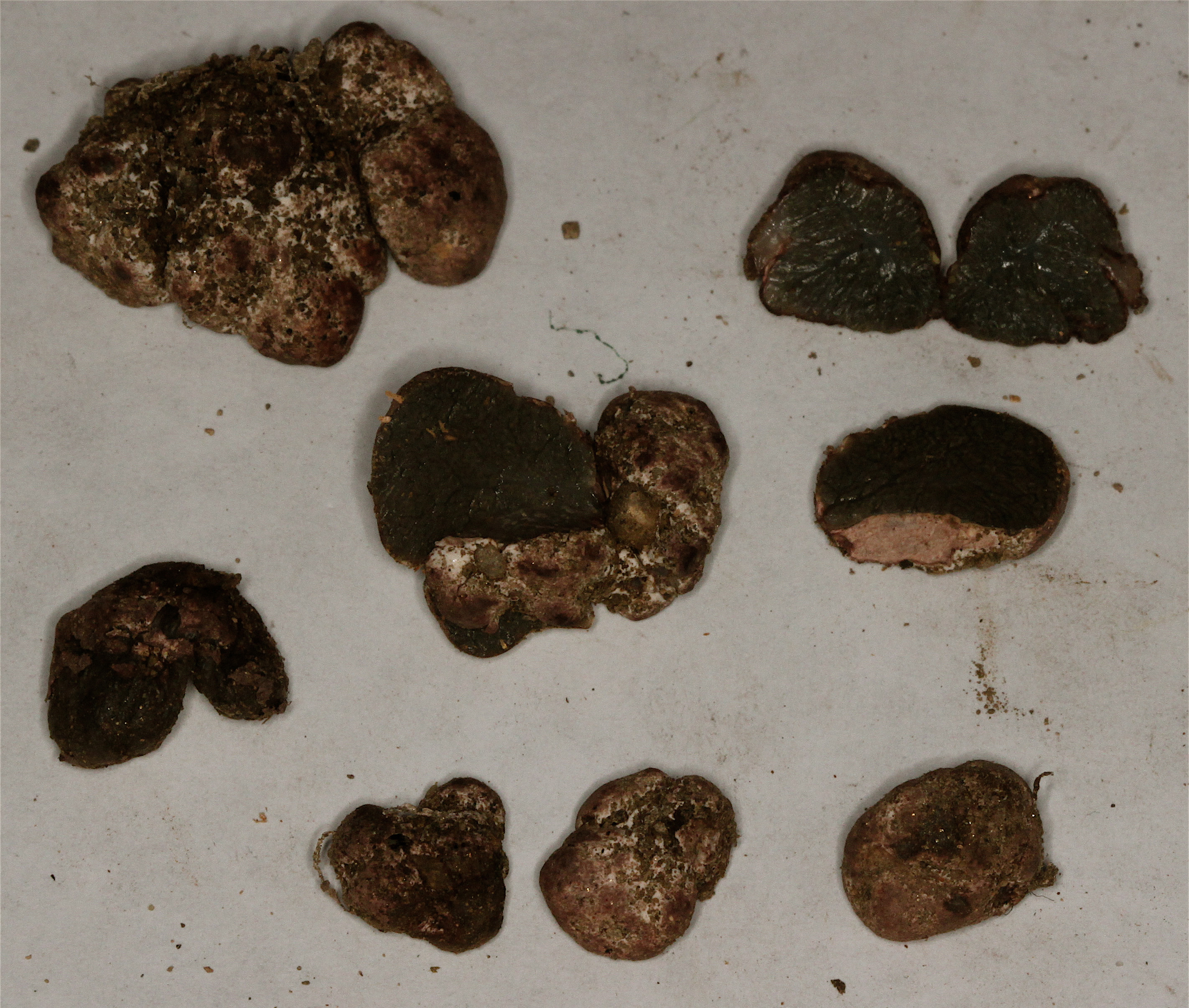
- Unidentified Trappea species

Scientific classification
- Kingdom: Fungi
- Division: Basidiomycota
- Class: Agaricomycetes
- Order: Hysterangiales
- Family: Trappeaceae; P.M.Kirk (2008)

Type genus
- Trappea Castellano (1990)

Genera
- Phallobata; Trappea

= Trappeaceae =

Family of fungi

The Trappeaceae are a family of truffle-like fungi in the order Hysterangiales. The family contains two genera and four species.
