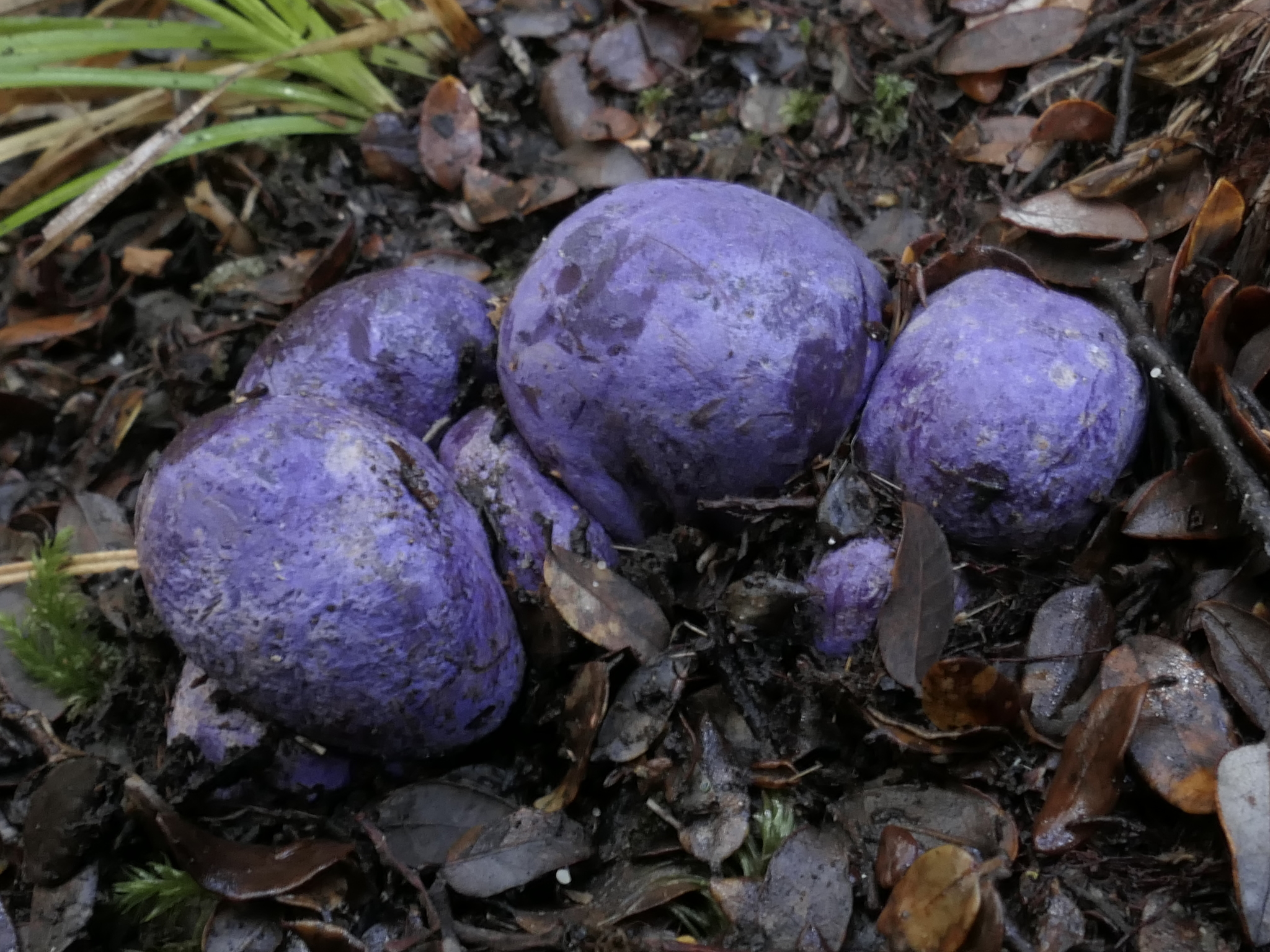
- Gallacea scleroderma

Scientific classification
- Kingdom: Fungi
- Division: Basidiomycota
- Class: Agaricomycetes
- Order: Hysterangiales
- Family: Gallaceaceae; Locq. ex. P.M.Kirk

Type genus
- Gallacea Lloyd (1905)

Genera
- Austrogautieria; Gallacea; Hallingea

Synonyms
- Gallaceaceae Locq. 1974

= Gallaceaceae =

Family of fungi

The Gallaceaceae are a family of fungi in the order Hysterangiales, containing species found in Australia and New Zealand. The family contains three genera and 16 species.
