= Mesophellia =

Scientific classification
- Kingdom: Fungi
- Division: Basidiomycota
- Class: Agaricomycetes
- Order: Hysterangiales
- Family: Mesophelliaceae
- Genus: Mesophellia; Berk. (1857)

Type species
- Mesophellia arenaria Berk. (1857)

Species
- ~15, see text

Synonyms
- Potoromyces Müll. bis ex Hollós (1902)

Genus of fungi

Mesophellia is a genus of truffle-like fungi in the Mesophelliaceae family. The genus contains about 15 species that are found in Australia. Mesophellia was circumscribed by Miles Joseph Berkeley in 1857.

== Species ==
- Mesophellia angustispora
- Mesophellia arenaria
- Mesophellia brevispora
- Mesophellia castanea
- Mesophellia clelandii
- Mesophellia glareoides
- Mesophellia glauca
- Mesophellia labyrinthina
- Mesophellia oleifera
- Mesophellia pallidospora
- Mesophellia parva
- Mesophellia parvispora
- Mesophellia rava
- Mesophellia rodwayi
- Mesophellia sabulosa
- Mesophellia trabalis
- Mesophellia tropica
- Mesophellia westresii
