= Mesophelliaceae =

Scientific classification
- Kingdom: Fungi
- Division: Basidiomycota
- Class: Agaricomycetes
- Order: Hysterangiales
- Family: Mesophelliaceae (Cunningham) Jülich (1981)

Type genus
- Mesophellia Berk. (1857)

Genera
- Andebbia; Castoreum; Chondrogaster; Gummiglobus; Gummivena; Malajczukia; Mesophellia; Nothocastoreum

Family of fungi

The Mesophelliaceae are a family of truffle-fungi in the order Hysterangiales. The family contains 8 genera and 33 species.
