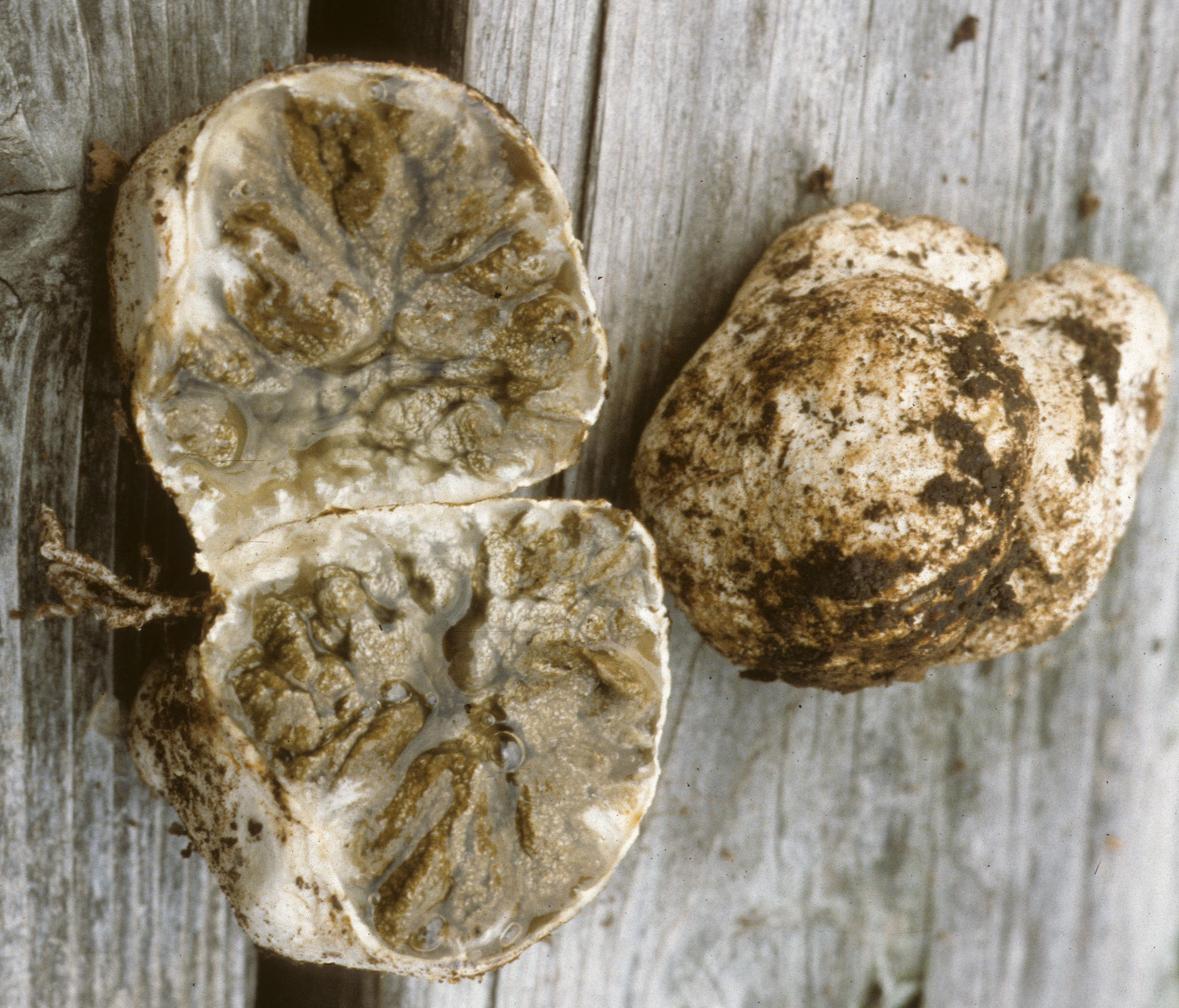
- Protubera sabulonensis

Scientific classification
- Kingdom: Fungi
- Division: Basidiomycota
- Class: Agaricomycetes
- Order: Hysterangiales
- Family: Phallogastraceae; Locq. (1974)

Type genus
- Phallogaster Morgan (1893)

Genera
- Phallogaster; Protubera

= Phallogastraceae =

Family of fungi

The Phallogastraceae are a family of fungi in the order Hysterangiales. The family contains 2 genera and 14 species.
