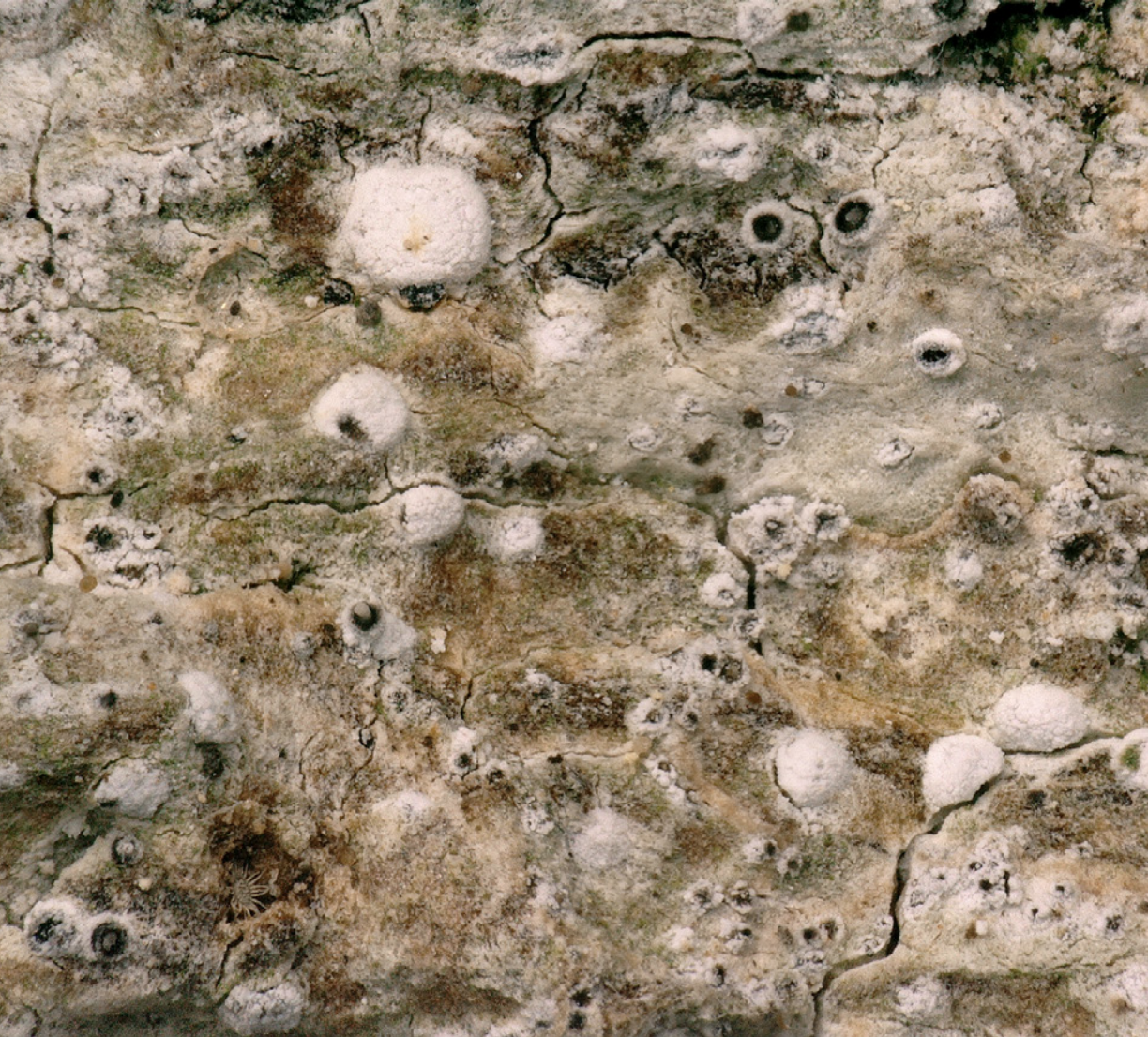

Scientific classification
- Kingdom: Fungi
- Division: Ascomycota
- Class: Arthoniomycetes
- Order: Arthoniales
- Family: Arthoniaceae
- Genus: Inoderma
- Species: I. byssaceum

Binomial name
- Inoderma byssaceum (Weigel) Gray (1821)

Synonyms
- List: Sphaeria byssacea Weigel (1772); Verrucaria byssacea (Weigel) Ach. (1809); Pyrenotea byssacea (Weigel) Torss. (1843); Thrombium byssaceum (Weigel) Schaer. (1850); Lecanactis biformis f. byssacea (Weigel) Zwackh (1862); Arthonia byssacea (Weigel) Almq. (1880); Lecanactis byssacea (Weigel) Arnold (1884); Opegrapha byssacea (Weigel) M.Choisy (1950)

= Inoderma byssaceum =

Species of lichen-forming fungus

Inoderma byssaceum is a species of corticolous (bark-dwelling) crustose lichen in the family Arthoniaceae. It forms a thin, whitish crust on tree bark and is recognised by its conspicuous white-frosted fruiting bodies that resemble tiny cups dusted with powder. The lichen grows primarily on old oaks in humid forests across the temperate Northern Hemisphere and has declined markedly in recent decades, leading to its inclusion on numerous national red lists. Originally described in 1772 from oak bark in Germany, the lichen serves as the type species for the genus Inoderma, a genus characterised by these distinctive white-pruinose reproductive structures.

== Taxonomy ==
In a modern reappraisal of the group published in 2015, the genus Inoderma was formally lectotypified with I. byssaceum and reinstated for species characterised by elevated, white, frost-like asexual structures (pruinose pycnidia) and typically white-pruinose, immersed to adnate fruiting bodies (apothecia) with a weakly gelatinised spore layer.

The species has a complicated synonymy reflecting those shifts: it was first described by Weigel in 1772 as Sphaeria byssacea, later combined as Verrucaria byssacea (Acharius, 1803) and Arthonia byssacea (Almquist, 1880), before placement in Inoderma by Gray in 1821. The protologue indicates an oak-bark habitat, and the authors report that the original type material could not be located in the University of Jena herbarium.

Within the genus, I. byssaceum is the species on which the generic name and concept of Inoderma are based. Sterile material can resemble I. nipponicum or I. afromontanum, but I. byssaceum differs consistently in its chemistry: routine spot tests on the thallus and its white pruina are negative (K−, C−, KC−, Pd−), and thin-layer chromatography detects a distinctive set of "byssaceum unknowns" (possibly including 2'-O-methylperlatolic acid). Where measured, its conidia are somewhat shorter and not weakly curved.

== Description ==
The thallus (lichen body) is whitish to pale fawn and forms continuous sheets that may crack into small plates; it lacks a true outer skin (ecorticate) so the surface looks matt, slightly felted or scurfy. In section it is thin (to about 0.05 mm) and largely buried in the outer bark. The photosynthetic partner is a trentepohlioid green alga (cells roughly 12–25 × 5–22 μm), and no calcium oxalate crystals were seen.

Sexual fruiting bodies (apothecia) are small rounded discs, about 0.4–1.0 mm in diameter, sitting level with to slightly raised above the thallus and dusted with a white, frost-like coating (pruina). Inside, the spore layer is only moderately gelatinised; the tissue beneath it (the hypothecium) is dark brown and well developed. Ascospores are colourless (hyaline), narrowly obovate, usually with 3–4 cross-walls (septa), and measure roughly 13.5–16.7 (to 19.0) × 4.5–5.5 (to 6.0) μm.

Asexual fruiting bodies (pycnidia) are numerous and conspicuous: dark brown to black cups 0.15–0.40 mm across whose rims and "shoulders" are coated in a thick white pruina. The pore is entire to ragged, and the interior is bowl-shaped, often partitioned by thin septa; the wall is carbonised. The pycnidia produce bacilliform conidia about 4.5–6.0 × 1.0–1.5 μm.

Chemically, the species shows the "byssaceum unknowns" on high-performance thin-layer chromatography; routine spot tests on the thallus, apothecia and pycnidial pruina are negative (K−, C−, KC−, Pd−). Iodine tests used by specialists show blue to red-blue reactions in the gels of the fruiting bodies, while the granular crystals in the apothecial rim dissolve in K and in Lactophenol cotton blue but not in sulphuric acid.

== Habitat and distribution ==
In temperate Europe, Inoderma byssaceum is largely tied to the bark of old oaks and tends to occur in old-growth forests or on veteran trees in locally humid climates. The species has undergone a marked decline in recent decades and is listed on many national red lists. In 2023, it was recorded for the first time in Belgium, where it was found on the trunk of an old oak in a well-preserved mixed deciduous forest in the Lorraine district of southern Belgium. In this region the species is regarded as an indicator of long-continuity, well-preserved oak forests and is otherwise rare or very rare in neighbouring countries such as Germany, France, Great Britain and Luxembourg, absent from the Netherlands, and treated as threatened with extinction in France, so the Belgian locality is considered to merit specific protection measures.

In north-eastern North America the lichen has been collected on a range of deciduous and coniferous hosts with deeply fissured or flaky bark, including Quercus species, Acer saccharum, Chamaecyparis thyoides and Thuja species, from habitats such as northern hardwood forest, cedar–red maple woods, and even a boggy stream margin. Records also exist from Hokkaido, Japan. Overall, the species is widely distributed across the Northern Hemisphere, with documented occurrences from Japan and Russia's Primorsky Krai, which connects the western Eurasian range to nearby Hokkaidō.
