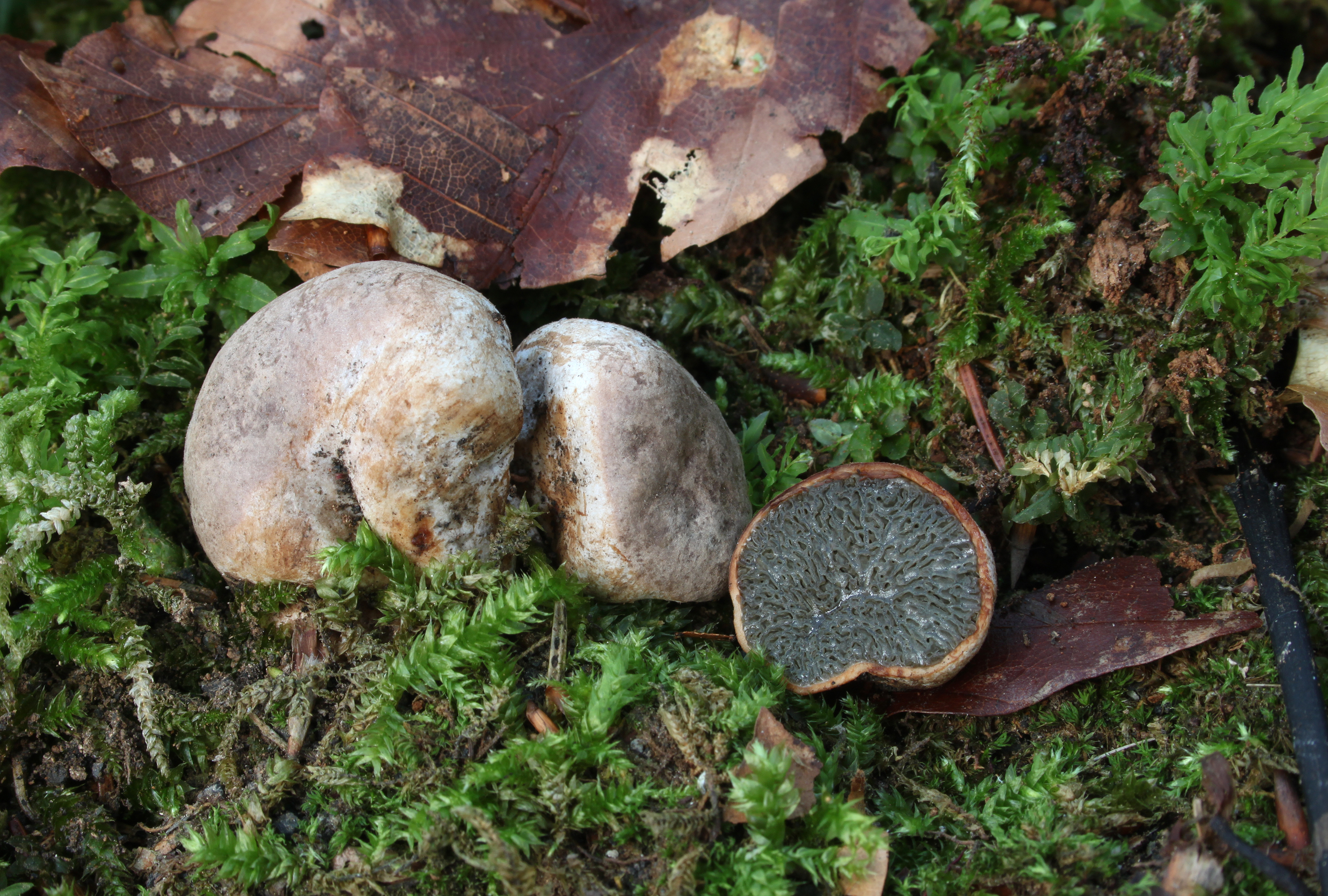
- Hysterangium stoloniferum

Scientific classification
- Kingdom: Fungi
- Division: Basidiomycota
- Class: Agaricomycetes
- Subclass: Phallomycetidae
- Order: Hysterangiales; K.Hosaka & Castellano (2007)

Families
- Gallaceaceae; Hysterangiaceae; Mesophelliaceae; Phallogastraceae; Trappeaceae

= Hysterangiales =

Order of fungi

The Hysterangiales are an order of fungi in the class Agaricomycetes, subclass Phallomycetidae. According to one 2008 estimate, the order contains five families, 18 genera, and 114 species.
