= Herpothallon furfuraceum =

Scientific classification
- Domain: Eukaryota
- Kingdom: Fungi
- Division: Ascomycota
- Class: Arthoniomycetes
- Order: Arthoniales
- Family: Arthoniaceae
- Genus: Herpothallon
- Species: H. furfuraceum

Binomial name
- Herpothallon furfuraceum G.Thor (2009)

Species of lichen

Herpothallon furfuraceum is a species of corticolous (bark-dwelling), crustose lichen in the family Arthoniaceae. Found in Costa Rica, it was formally described as new to science in 2009 by the lichenologist Göran Thor. It is only known to occur in two locations in Costa Rica, at elevations ranging from 900 to 1,350 m (2,950 to 4,430 ft). It contains confluentic acid and chiodectonic acid as major lichen products. The authors suggest that because this lichen resembles a more weakly pigmented version of the more common and widespread Herpothallon rubrocinctum, it may be commonly overlooked by collectors.
