= Herpothallon saxorum =

Scientific classification
- Kingdom: Fungi
- Division: Ascomycota
- Class: Arthoniomycetes
- Order: Arthoniales
- Family: Arthoniaceae
- Genus: Herpothallon
- Species: H. saxorum

Binomial name
- Herpothallon saxorum Bungartz & Elix (2013)
- Holotype: Santiago Island, the Galápagos

Species of lichen

Herpothallon saxorum is a species of saxicolous (rock-dwelling) crustose lichen in the family Arthoniaceae. Described as a new species in 2013, it is known to occur only on the Galápagos Islands.

== Taxonomy ==
Herpothallon saxorum was formally described as a new species in 2013 by the lichenologists Frank Bungartz and John Elix. It belongs to the genus Herpothallon, which was segregated from the closely related genus Cryptothecia in 2009. The specific epithet saxorum refers to its saxicolous (rock-dwelling) nature, which distinguishes it from most other members of the genus that typically grow on bark.

The species was initially confused with a chemotype of Herpothallon granulare, a morphologically similar species, but was determined to be chemically distinct through thin-layer chromatography analysis. While appearing superficially similar to H. granulare, H. saxorum differs in its substrate preference, chemical composition, and certain morphological details.

== Description ==
Herpothallon saxorum forms a crust-like growth on rock surfaces. The thallus (lichen body) is bordered by a broad margin of white, cobweb-like (arachnoid) fungal filaments that quickly form into loosely radiating fibrous strands. The main thallus surface appears dull greenish to beige, becoming whiter with age.

The lichen lacks a cortex (protective outer layer), giving it an ecorticate appearance. The entire thallus initially consists of loosely interwoven hyphae (fungal filaments) that form distinct fibrous strands. As it ages, these strands rarely become more densely interwoven and cottony. Rather than developing into a clearly differentiated thallus, the surface is typically covered with abundant, coarsely granular pseudisidia (vegetative reproductive structures that resemble isidia but lack internal differentiation).

The medulla (inner tissue) is poorly differentiated and indistinct, with hyphae covered by colorless to pale brownish granules. Unlike some related species, it lacks calcium oxalate crystals.

In chemical tests, the thallus is P+ (yellow) and K+ (yellow), but also C− and KC−. Under ultraviolet light, it shows a dull fluorescence (UV+ dull). When tested with Lugol's iodine solution, the medulla shows no reaction (I−). Chemical analysis reveals the presence of brialmontin 1, brialmontin 2, and confluentic acid, a combination that distinguishes it from the morphologically similar H. granulare, which contains perlatolic acid.

No reproductive structures producing spores (asci) or conidia (pycnidia) have been observed in this species.

== Habitat and distribution ==
Herpothallon saxorum is known only from the Galápagos Islands and is likely endemic to the archipelago. It is moderately common throughout the dry and lower transition zones, occasionally extending into the humid zone.

Unlike most other species in the genus Herpothallon, which typically grow on tree bark, H. saxorum is exclusively found on sheltered, shaded rock faces and overhangs. It has been collected from various locations in the islands, including Santa Cruz, Isabela, and Santiago, often growing on basalt boulders and rock outcrops in sheltered positions.
