= Herpothallon confusum =

Scientific classification
- Domain: Eukaryota
- Kingdom: Fungi
- Division: Ascomycota
- Class: Arthoniomycetes
- Order: Arthoniales
- Family: Arthoniaceae
- Genus: Herpothallon
- Species: H. confusum

Binomial name
- Herpothallon confusum G.Thor (2009)

Species of lichen

Herpothallon confusum is a little-known species of corticolous (bark-dwelling), crustose lichen in the family Arthoniaceae. Found in Venezuela, it was formally described as new to science in 2009 by the lichenologist Göran Thor. It contains confluentic acid and 2'-O-methylevernic acid as major lichen products, evernic acid as a minor metabolite, and trace amounts of chiodectonic acid. The lichen is only known from a couple of documented collections made in lowland rainforests.
