= Herpothallon tricolor =

Scientific classification
- Kingdom: Fungi
- Division: Ascomycota
- Class: Arthoniomycetes
- Order: Arthoniales
- Family: Arthoniaceae
- Genus: Herpothallon
- Species: H. tricolor

Binomial name
- Herpothallon tricolor Aptroot & M.Cáceres (2017)

Species of lichen

Herpothallon tricolor is a rare species of corticolous (bark-dwelling), crustose lichen in the family Arthoniaceae. Found in South Brazil, it was described as a new species in 2017. It is distinguished from others species in genus Herpothallon by its unique colouration: a combination of a grey thallus with a bright red hypothallus and orange-tipped pseudoisidia.

== Taxonomy ==
Herpothallon tricolor was identified and described as a new species in 2017 by lichenologists André Aptroot and Marcela Cáceres. The species epithet tricolor was assigned because of the distinct three-coloured appearance of the lichen's body. Its type specimen was found by the authors in the Parque Estadual Acaraípt (São Francisco do Sul, Santa Catarina).

The genus Herpothallon was reintroduced by Aptroot and his colleagues in 2009 to include a group of mostly sterile lichens. Over the years, several species have been added to this genus, primarily discovered in tropical regions of Afro-Eurasia.

== Description ==
Herpothallon tricolor is characterized by a corticolous, or bark-dwelling, thallus, which is the vegetative body of the lichen. It features a whitish-grey hue, with a thickness of approximately 0.2 mm and can spread up to 20 cm (8 in) in diameter. Unique to this species is a bright red underlayer, or hypothallus, and margin, along with orange pseudoisidia in the centre of the thallus. Pseudoisidia are outgrowths that help in the reproduction and dispersal of the lichen. What sets Herpothallon tricolor apart from other species within the same genus is the unique combination of a grey thallus with a bright red hypothallus and orange-tipped pseudoisidia. This distinct set of characteristics was acknowledged in the field, even before its formal description.

This lichen is devoid of ascomata and pycnidia, reproductive structures found in many other lichen species. Two distinctive lichen products, chiodectonic acid and confluentic acid, are found in Herpothallon tricolor.

== Habitat and distribution ==
Herpothallon tricolor is found on tree bark within the restinga ecosystems, a type of coastal forest common in Brazil. The species is currently only known to occur in its type locality in Brazil.
