= Coniarthonia gregarina =

Scientific classification
- Kingdom: Fungi
- Division: Ascomycota
- Class: Arthoniomycetes
- Order: Arthoniales
- Family: Arthoniaceae
- Genus: Coniarthonia
- Species: C. gregarina

Binomial name
- Coniarthonia gregarina (Willey) Grube (2001)

Synonyms
- Arthonia gregarina Willey (1887); Arthothelium gregarinum (Willey) Zahlbr. (1903)

Species of lichen-forming fungus

Coniarthonia gregarina is a species of crustose lichen-forming fungus in the family Arthoniaceae. It is a bark-dwelling lichen with a thin, whitish crust and crimson-red, spot-like fruiting bodies containing large, multi-chambered ascospores. Originally described from Florida in 1887, it has also been recorded from Brazil.

== Taxonomy ==
Coniarthonia gregarina is a member of the Coniarthonia pyrrhula group, a subset of the genus characterized by comparatively large, multi-septate to muriform ascospores and a distinct set of reddish pigments associated with the fruiting bodies (ascomata). Grube made the new combination in 2001, transferring the species from its original placement as Arthonia gregarina Willey (1887). Willey's original description was brief and diagnosis-focused, characterizing the species as having a thin, white, spreading thallus; small, crimson, irregularly oblong to spot-like apothecia; and ellipsoid, muriform (multichambered) spores measuring 0.028–0.040 by 0.013–0.016 mm. The name has also appeared in the literature as Arthothelium gregarinum (Willey) Zahlbr. (1903).

The species is based on material collected in Florida, USA, gathered in 1879 by Allen Hiram Curtiss. In his 2001 treatment, Grube selected a lectotype (the single specimen later designated as the name-bearing type) housed at the United States National Herbarium (US), and he cited an isolectotype (a duplicate specimen from the same original collection) at the Nylander Herbarium, part of the Finnish Museum of Natural History (H-NYL 5596).

== Description ==
The lichen body (thallus) is a thin, whitish, crust-like growth that spreads across the bark and can disrupt the bark surface; in cross-section it is about 30–50 μm thick. The surface shows fine cracks and is bordered by brownish boundary lines (prothallus). The algal partner (photobiont) is indistinct but is thought to be the green alga Trentepohlia; its cells are about 10–14 × 7 μm.

The fruiting bodies (ascomata) are scattered and broadly protruding from the bark (erumpent), usually roundish to spot-like, about 0.25–1.25 mm across and 75–120 μm thick in cross-section. They sit level with the thallus and are often partly covered by bark fragments. The surface of the fruiting bodies is crimson-red and frosted with pigment (pruinose), with areas above mature spore-bearing structures (asci) turning brownish. The red pigment occurs as fine crystalline grains that can clump together into larger aggregates. Under the microscope, the uppermost tissue layer (epithecium) is densely pigmented and water-repellent (hydrophobic, about 25–40 μm thick), and the asci are more or less dispersed, spherical to nearly spherical (globose to subglobose, about 77–90 × 45–60 μm) with a distinct stalk. The ascospores are persistently colorless (hyaline) and divided by both transverse and longitudinal cross-walls (muriform), measuring about 30–40 × 14–19 μm, with roughly nine transverse cross-walls and 1–3 longitudinal cross-walls per segment; the pattern of division can be irregular.

In chemical reactions reported from microscopic preparations, the red pigments dissolve in KOH and shift to a purplish-orange tone, and iodine reactions are described for gels and ascus/spore structures.

== Habitat and distribution ==
Coniarthonia gregarina is a bark-dwelling, lichen-forming species recorded from smooth bark. It was originally known from Florida based on the type and additional examined material. The lichen was later recorded from Mato Grosso do Sul, Brazil.

Grube noted that it can resemble C. pyrrhula and C. wilmsiana at a glance, but it differs from both by its muriform ascospores and by having a smaller amount of reddish pigment in the ascomata; young spores with only three septa may resemble the mature spores of C. wilmsiana. Because the available material was limited, secondary chemistry was not analyzed by thin-layer chromatography.
