= Herpothallon nigroisidiatum =

Scientific classification
- Kingdom: Fungi
- Division: Ascomycota
- Class: Arthoniomycetes
- Order: Arthoniales
- Family: Arthoniaceae
- Genus: Herpothallon
- Species: H. nigroisidiatum

Binomial name
- Herpothallon nigroisidiatum G.Thor (2009)

Species of lichen

Herpothallon nigroisidiatum is a little-known species of corticolous (bark-dwelling), crustose lichen in the family Arthoniaceae. Found in Peru, it was formally described as new to science in 2009 by the lichenologist Göran Thor. It contains neodiffractic acid as its major lichen product, along with trace amounts of confluentic acid and chiodectonic acid. It is only known to occur at its type locality, which is a tropical rainforest in the Cordillera Escalera, San Martín. The species epithet nigroisidiatum refers to its pseudisidia, which have a black hypothallus that sometimes projects up into their inner parts and colours them black.
