= Herpothallon pustulatum =

Scientific classification
- Domain: Eukaryota
- Kingdom: Fungi
- Division: Ascomycota
- Class: Arthoniomycetes
- Order: Arthoniales
- Family: Arthoniaceae
- Genus: Herpothallon
- Species: H. pustulatum

Binomial name
- Herpothallon pustulatum G.Thor (2009)

Species of lichen

Herpothallon pustulatum is a species of corticolous (bark-dwelling), crustose lichen in the family Arthoniaceae. It was formally described as new to science in 2009 by the lichenologist Göran Thor. It is found in montane forests in Costa Rica, Brazil, and Venezuela. It contains confluentic acid as its major lichen product along with trace amounts of several other substances.
