= Herpothallon confluenticum =

Scientific classification
- Domain: Eukaryota
- Kingdom: Fungi
- Division: Ascomycota
- Class: Arthoniomycetes
- Order: Arthoniales
- Family: Arthoniaceae
- Genus: Herpothallon
- Species: H. confluenticum

Binomial name
- Herpothallon confluenticum Aptroot & Lücking (2009)

Species of lichen

Herpothallon confluenticum is a species of corticolous (bark-dwelling), crustose lichen in the family Arthoniaceae. Originally described from specimens collected in Thailand, it was formally described as new to science in 2009 by the lichenologists André Aptroot and Robert Lücking. The lichen has also been recorded in other localities in Asia, Australia, and South America. It contains confluentic acid as a major lichen product.
