= Herpothallon adnatum =

Scientific classification
- Kingdom: Fungi
- Division: Ascomycota
- Class: Arthoniomycetes
- Order: Arthoniales
- Family: Arthoniaceae
- Genus: Herpothallon
- Species: H. adnatum

Binomial name
- Herpothallon adnatum G.Thor (2009)
- Holotype site: Cuzco, Peru

Species of lichen

Herpothallon adnatum is a little-known species of corticolous (bark-dwelling), crustose lichen in the family Arthoniaceae. Found in Peru, it was formally described as new to science in 2009 by the lichenologist Göran Thor. The type specimen was collected from Paucartambo, (Cuzco region), at an elevation of 850 m (2,790 ft). The species is only known to occur at the type locality. It contains confluentic acid as its major lichen product, along with trace amounts of a few others.
