= Herpothallon hypoprotocetraricum =

Scientific classification
- Kingdom: Fungi
- Division: Ascomycota
- Class: Arthoniomycetes
- Order: Arthoniales
- Family: Arthoniaceae
- Genus: Herpothallon
- Species: H. hypoprotocetraricum

Binomial name
- Herpothallon hypoprotocetraricum G.Thor (2009)

Species of lichen

Herpothallon hypoprotocetraricum is a little-known species of corticolous (bark-dwelling), crustose lichen in the family Arthoniaceae. Found in Tanzania, it was formally described as new to science in 2009 by the lichenologist Göran Thor. The type specimen was collected by Edit Farkas in 1989 from a rocky forest on the south-east slope of Mount Kanga, a hill of the Nguru Mountains in the Mvomero district, Morogoro, Tanzania, at an altitude between 1,200 and 1,300 m (3,900 and 4,300 ft). It is only known to occur at the type locality. The lichen contains hypoprotocetraric acid as its major lichen substance, along with minor amounts of chiodectonic acid and trace amounts of several other lichen products.
