= Coniarthonia minima =

Scientific classification
- Kingdom: Fungi
- Division: Ascomycota
- Class: Arthoniomycetes
- Order: Arthoniales
- Family: Arthoniaceae
- Genus: Coniarthonia
- Species: C. minima

Binomial name
- Coniarthonia minima Kalb & Aptroot (2018)
- Type locality: Morton National Park, Australia

Species of lichen-forming fungus

Coniarthonia minima is a species of lichen-forming fungus in the family Arthoniaceae. It is the smallest known species in the genus, with tiny, bright red fruiting bodies only 0.1–0.2 mm across and no visible lichen body. The species was described in 2018 from rainforest in Morton National Park, New South Wales, Australia.

== Taxonomy ==
Coniarthonia minima was formally described as a new species from Australia based on a collection made in Morton National Park (New South Wales), about 8 km northeast of Nerriga. It was collected on 5 August 1992 by K. Kalb, A. Kalb, and J.A. Elix (collection no. 26648); the holotype is deposited in the Australian National Herbarium in Canberra (CANB).

The species is distinctive within the genus because it is reported to be non-lichenised (lacking a thallus) and is described as the smallest known species of Coniarthonia. In overall spore type and ascomatal form it is placed with the C. pulcherrima group, sharing rounded ascomata and 1-septate ascospores. It is most similar to C. pulcherrima but differs in its much smaller ascomata (0.1–0.2 mm across rather than 0.5–1.5 mm) and narrower ascospores (2.5–3.0 μm wide rather than 3.5–5 μm).

== Description ==
Unlike most lichens, Coniarthonia minima has no visible thallus. The fruiting bodies (apothecia) are sessile (resting on the substrate without a stalk), convex, and lack a distinct margin. They are bright red, measuring only 0.1–0.2 mm in diameter.

Under the microscope, the spore-bearing layer (hymenium) is colourless (hyaline) and lacks both a gelatinous matrix and oil droplets (not inspersed). The asci are club-shaped (clavate), about 30 × 15 μm. The sterile filaments between the asci (paraphysoids) are about 2 μm wide, branched, and interconnecting (anastomosing). The uppermost tissue layer (epihymenium) contains bright orange crystals, while the tissue beneath the spore-bearing layer (hypothecium) remains colourless. The ascospores are colourless, club-shaped, and 2-celled (1-septate), measuring 9.5–10.5 × 2.5–3.0 μm. They have rounded ends, are not curved, and lack a gelatinous sheath. Pycnidia (asexual fruiting bodies) have not been observed.

In spot tests, the apothecia are UV− and C−, with a K+ blood-red (almost black) reaction; the chemistry is reported as an unidentified anthraquinone.

== Habitat and distribution ==
Coniarthonia minima is known from tree bark in rainforest in Morton National Park, New South Wales, Australia, at around 650 m elevation. It appears to be known only from the type collection.
