= Herpothallon capilliferum =

Scientific classification
- Domain: Eukaryota
- Kingdom: Fungi
- Division: Ascomycota
- Class: Arthoniomycetes
- Order: Arthoniales
- Family: Arthoniaceae
- Genus: Herpothallon
- Species: H. capilliferum

Binomial name
- Herpothallon capilliferum P.F.Chen & L.L.Zhang (2022)

Species of lichen

Herpothallon capilliferum is a species of corticolous (bark-dwelling), crustose lichen in the family Arthoniaceae. Found in China, it was formally described as a new species in 2022 by Pengfei Chen and Lulu Zhang. The type was collected from Dayang Lake Nature Reserve (Jingning County, Zhejiang) at an elevation of 1,405 m (4,610 ft); here the lichen was found growing on Nyssa sinensis. The main characteristics of the species are the presence of norstictic acid as a major lichen product, and the projecting hyphae of the pseudisidia. The species epithet capilliferum refers to this latter characteristic.
