= Coniarthonia haematodea =

Scientific classification
- Kingdom: Fungi
- Division: Ascomycota
- Class: Arthoniomycetes
- Order: Arthoniales
- Family: Arthoniaceae
- Genus: Coniarthonia
- Species: C. haematodea

Binomial name
- Coniarthonia haematodea Grube (2001)

Species of lichen-forming fungus

Coniarthonia haematodea is a species of lichen-forming fungus in the family Arthoniaceae. It is a bark-dwelling lichen with a thin, whitish crust and blood-red, spot-like fruiting bodies, known only from Bahia, Brazil. The species was formally described in 2001 and is named for the color of its fruiting bodies.

== Taxonomy ==
Coniarthonia haematodea was described as a new species by Martin Grube in 2001, based on material collected by Klaus Kalb in July 1980 in Bahia, Brazil (Serra do Tombador, between Mundo Novo and Morro do Chapéu) at about 1,000 m (3,300 ft) elevation. The holotype (Kalb 22895) is housed in Kalb's herbarium.

Grube treated the species as part of the C. pyrrhula group, whose members have relatively large, multi-septate to muriform (multi-chambered) ascospores and a characteristic suite of reddish pigments detectable by thin-layer chromatography. The specific epithet haematodea refers to the blood-red external color of the ascomata.

== Description ==
The body (thallus) is a thin, whitish crust that develops within the uppermost layers of the bark. The green algal partner (photobiont) is sparse and consists of Trentepohlia cells (about 15–25 × 8–10 μm) arranged in long chains.

The fruiting bodies (ascomata) are scattered and partly protruding from the bark (erumpent), usually roundish and spot-like (sometimes slightly elongated and aligned with the bark fibres), about 0.48–2.6 mm across and 130–180 μm thick in cross-section. They are convex and densely frosted with dark red pigment (pruinose); a distinct outer wall (excipuloid layers) is not evident. The uppermost tissue layer (epithecium) is water-repellent (hydrophobic) and densely packed with crimson to violet pigment crystals (without a colorless fraction), and the spore-bearing layer (hymenium) also contains abundant crimson crystals. The asci are nearly spherical (subglobose), stalked, and each contains eight ascospores. The ascospores are persistently colorless (hyaline), smooth, divided into 6 cells (5-septate), and measure about 27–36 × 10–13 μm.

Chemically, the reddish pigments dissolve in K (K+ orange-red), and Grube reported a violet pigment (Hae1) along with several purplish pigment fractions (Hae2, Pyr1–Pyr3) and an additional trace pigment based on thin-layer chromatography.

== Habitat and distribution ==
Coniarthonia haematodea is a lichen-forming fungus species that occurs on bast (inner bark tissues). Grube noted that, based on the type specimen, it appears to be poorly lichenized, consistent with the very sparse photobiont.

The species is known only from the type locality in Bahia, Brazil. It is similar to C. pyrrhula in ascospore characters, but differs by having larger, spot-like ascomata and fewer ascospore septa. As of 2025, it had not been reported elsewhere in Brazil.
