= Coniarthonia pulcherrima =

Scientific classification
- Kingdom: Fungi
- Division: Ascomycota
- Class: Arthoniomycetes
- Order: Arthoniales
- Family: Arthoniaceae
- Genus: Coniarthonia
- Species: C. pulcherrima

Binomial name
- Coniarthonia pulcherrima (Müll.Arg.) Grube (2001)

Synonyms
- Arthonia pulcherrima Müll.Arg. (1886)

Species of lichen-forming fungus

Coniarthonia pulcherrima is a species of lichen-forming fungus in the family Arthoniaceae. It is a bark-dwelling lichen with a thin, whitish crust and distinctive scarlet-red, rounded fruiting bodies, found in tropical regions from Hawaii to South America and the Caribbean. The species was originally described in 1886 and transferred to Coniarthonia in 2001.

== Taxonomy ==
Coniarthonia pulcherrima was originally described by Johannes Müller Argoviensis as Arthonia pulcherrima in 1886, based on material from Puerto Rico collected by Heinrich Schwenke (from the Hampe herbarium, 1877); the holotype is currently housed in the Geneva herbarium (G). In his revision establishing Coniarthonia, Martin Grube transferred the species to that genus as Coniarthonia pulcherrima. Grube treated it as part of the "C. pulcherrima group", whose members have small, single-septum (1-septate) ascospores under 20 micrometres long.

Within Coniarthonia, C. pulcherrima is closely related to C. erythrocarpa but is readily separated by its roundish, spot-like ascomata and smaller asci and ascospores. Externally it can also resemble C. wilmsiana, but differs in the 1-septate ascospores and in its secondary chemistry. Grube interpreted the main pigment as the naphthoquinone compound chiodectonic acid based on thin-layer chromatography.

== Description ==
The thallus is whitish and develops in the outer bark layers, often disrupting the bark and becoming more or less epiphloeodic; it is thin, and the surface is smooth to slightly floury. The photobiont is a trentepohlioid alga (from genus Trentepohlia or similar), with relatively thick-walled cells arranged in short chains.

The ascomata are typically isolated and roundish, about 0.5–1.5 mm in diameter, and lie at the same level as the thallus; they are flat to slightly convex and colored reddish to scarlet red. Anatomically, the ascomatal tissues are only weakly delimited, with an epithecium densely filled with dark crimson-red crystals (along with a smaller fraction of colorless crystals). The asci are dispersed, more or less spherical, and 8-spored, and the ascospores are persistently hyaline, obovate, and 1-septate (about 9–11 × 3.5–5 μm), with thin walls and a slight constriction at the septum. The reddish pigments dissolve in K (potassium hydroxide solution) and give a K+ (orange-red) reaction; chiodectonic acid was reported from the thallus.

The species most closely resembles Coniarthonia rosea, another bark-dwelling tropical member of the genus described from Brazilian Amazon rainforest. That species was reported growing alongside C. pulcherrima, but differs in having paler pink apothecia that are smaller and more irregular in outline rather than the darker, more rounded apothecia of C. pulcherrima. Its apothecial pigment also appears to be chemically different, and its ascospores are slightly larger than those of C. pulcherrima. Another similar species is C. megaspora, described from northeastern Brazil. It resembles C. pulcherrima in overall morphology but differs in having much larger, club-shaped (clavate) ascospores measuring about 23–26 × 9–10 μm.

== Habitat and distribution ==
Coniarthonia pulcherrima is a bark-dwelling species recorded from smooth bark. Grube reported it as occurring in Hawaii and across tropical regions of South America and the Greater Antilles. The additional material he cited includes collections from Oʻahu (Hawaii), Puerto Rico, and multiple mainland Neotropical localities (e.g., Colombia, Guyana, and Brazil), consistent with a broadly tropical distribution. In Brazil, it has been recorded from several states: Amazonas, Rondônia, Pará, and Ceará. Ecological data on this lichen is limited, but one specimen was reported from a moist, shady setting inside rainforest.
