= Herpothallon elegans =

Scientific classification
- Domain: Eukaryota
- Kingdom: Fungi
- Division: Ascomycota
- Class: Arthoniomycetes
- Order: Arthoniales
- Family: Arthoniaceae
- Genus: Herpothallon
- Species: H. elegans

Binomial name
- Herpothallon elegans G.Thor (2009)

Species of lichen

Herpothallon elegans is a rare species of corticolous (bark-dwelling), crustose lichen in the family Arthoniaceae. Found in Peru, it was formally described as new to science in 2009 by the lichenologist Göran Thor. It contains confluentic acid and lichexanthone as major lichen products. It is only known to occur in tropical rainforest at a couple of locations, with elevations of 850 m (2,790 ft) and about 1,200 m (3,900 ft).
