= Coniarthonia rosea =

Scientific classification
- Kingdom: Fungi
- Division: Ascomycota
- Class: Arthoniomycetes
- Order: Arthoniales
- Family: Arthoniaceae
- Genus: Coniarthonia
- Species: C. rosea

Binomial name
- Coniarthonia rosea Aptroot & M.Cáceres (2014)
- Holotype: Cuniã Ecological Station, Brazil

Species of lichen

Coniarthonia rosea is a species of lichen in the family Arthoniaceae. Described from the Brazilian Amazon in 2014, this lichen has since been found in several states across northern Brazil, where it grows on smooth tree bark in primary lowland rainforests. The species is distinguished by its pale pink, irregularly shaped fruiting bodies that contrast with its thin dark-brown crusty growth, and by its unusually long, club-shaped ascospores. While closely related to other species in the genus Coniarthonia, it differs from the similar C. pulcherrima by its paler coloration, smaller fruiting structures, and distinct red pigment chemistry.

== Taxonomy ==
Coniarthonia rosea was described as new in 2014 by the lichenologists André Aptroot and Marcela Cáceres. The type was collected on smooth tree bark in primary rainforest at Cuniã Ecological Station in Rondônia (Brazil), at about 100 m (330 ft) elevation.

The species belongs in Coniarthonia, a small genus characterised by hydrophobic, red-pigmented, margin-less apothecia and a crustose thallus. It grows with, but is consistently paler than, C. pulcherrima; its fruiting bodies (apothecia) are smaller and more irregular, and the pigment behaves as an anthraquinone rather than chiodectonic acid in tests, excluding the possibility that it is merely pigment-poor material of C. pulcherrima. In a later molecular analysis of several Arthoniaceae species, C. rosea was shown to have a sister group relationship with C. pulchra.

== Description ==
The thallus (lichen body) forms a very thin, dull, brown to dark-brown crust, usually only obvious around the fruiting bodies; no contrasting border (prothallus) is present, and the algal partner is of the Trentepohlia type. Apothecia (sexual fruiting bodies) are pale pink, slightly raised, and irregular—often linear or branched—and about 0.5–1.4 mm across; they lack a distinct margin and lack a differently colored frost (pruina). Internally there is no differentiated excipulum (outer wall); the hymenium (spore-bearing layer) lacks gel but stains blue with iodine (IKI+); the internal threads (paraphysoids) interlink; and the asci are short-ellipsoid to nearly spherical. The ascospores are produced eight per ascus; they are hyaline, one-septate, narrowly club-shaped, and long (about 55–65 × 13–16 μm) with a slight pinch at the septum. No asexual fruiting bodies (pycnidia) were seen. In chemical spot tests the apothecia are K+ (purple-red, fading through orange), UV−, C−, and P−; thin-layer chromatography shows an anthraquinone pigment.

== Habitat and distribution ==
The species grows on smooth tree bark in primary lowland rainforest. It was originally known only from Rondônia, where it was collected at the type locality and nearby sites around Porto Velho. It has since been recorded from the Brazilian states Amazonas and Amapá.
