= Coniarthonia megaspora =

Scientific classification
- Kingdom: Fungi
- Division: Ascomycota
- Class: Arthoniomycetes
- Order: Arthoniales
- Family: Arthoniaceae
- Genus: Coniarthonia
- Species: C. megaspora

Binomial name
- Coniarthonia megaspora Aptroot, C.Mendonça & M.Cáceres (2015)

Species of lichen-forming fungus

Coniarthonia megaspora is a species of lichen-forming fungus in the family Arthoniaceae. It is a bark-dwelling lichen with a thin, dark brown crust and distinctive dark pink, irregularly shaped fruiting bodies, found in primary Atlantic Forest in Brazil. The species was described in 2015 and is named for its unusually large spores.

== Taxonomy ==
Coniarthonia megaspora was described as a new species by André Aptroot, Cléverton de Oliveira Mendonça, and Marcela Cáceres in 2015 from specimens collected in northeastern Brazil. The type material was collected by Marcela Cáceres, Cléverton de Oliveira Mendonça, and André Aptroot in the south slope of Serra de Itabaiana National Park (Sergipe, Brazil), at about 400 m (1,300 ft) elevation, on tree bark, (collection 21759). The holotype is housed in the fungarium of the Federal University of Sergipe in Itabaiana, Sergipe, Brazil. The species epithet megaspora refers to the large ascospores.

The authors considered it most similar in overall appearance to Coniarthonia pulcherrima but separated it by its much larger, single-septum ascospores and by the unusual behavior of the spores, which can turn violet in tap water after release (seen best when a section is squashed).

== Description ==
The thallus is a thin, dull, brown to dark brown crust that can spread to about 5 cm (2 in) across, but is often most apparent around the fruiting bodies; no prothallus is present. The photobiont is trentepohlioid (from the green algal genus Trentepohlia).

The fruiting bodies (apothecia) are dark pink throughout, 0.2–0.6 mm wide, only slightly raised above the thallus, and commonly irregular in outline (often elongated or branched); they may merge together, lack a distinct margin, and have no differently colored frosting (pruina). A distinct outer wall (excipulum) is not developed. Under the microscope, the uppermost tissue layer (epihymenium) is blood red, and the spore-bearing layer (hymenium) lacks a gelatinous matrix (reported as "without gel") and stains blue with iodine–potassium iodide (IKI+ blue); the sterile filaments (paraphysoids) are interconnecting (anastomosing). The asci are oval (ellipsoid), do not stain with iodine (IKI−), are dispersed through the hymenium, and measure 63–76 × 20–26 μm (wall about 5 μm thick). Each ascus contains eight club-shaped (clavate), 2-celled (1-septate) ascospores measuring 23–26 × 9–10 μm, with broad, rounded ends and a slight pinch at the cross-wall; when a section is squashed in tap water the spores may turn violet, apparently by absorbing pigment from the surrounding tissue (hamathecium). Pycnidia (asexual fruiting bodies) were not observed.

In spot tests, the apothecia are UV−, C−, and P−, with a K+ (purple-red) reaction in which the pigment dissolves and briefly turns orange before fading. Thin-layer chromatography detected chiodectonic acid.

== Habitat and distribution ==
Coniarthonia megaspora is corticolous, occurring on smooth bark of trees in primary Atlantic Forest. It was originally known only from Brazil (Sergipe), based on the type collection and associated material. It has since been reported from Brazilian states Amazonas and Bahia.
