= Herpothallon cinereum =

Scientific classification
- Kingdom: Fungi
- Division: Ascomycota
- Class: Arthoniomycetes
- Order: Arthoniales
- Family: Arthoniaceae
- Genus: Herpothallon
- Species: H. cinereum

Binomial name
- Herpothallon cinereum G.Thor (2009)

Species of lichen

Herpothallon cinereum is a little-known species of corticolous (bark-dwelling), crustose lichen in the family Arthoniaceae. Found in Venezuela, it was formally described as new to science in 2009 by the lichenologist Göran Thor. It contains confluentic acid as its major lichen product. The lichen is only known to occur at its type locality in a tropical rainforest in Sierra Portuguesa (Lara) at an elevation of about 1,000 m (3,300 ft).
