= Herpothallon corallinum =

Scientific classification
- Domain: Eukaryota
- Kingdom: Fungi
- Division: Ascomycota
- Class: Arthoniomycetes
- Order: Arthoniales
- Family: Arthoniaceae
- Genus: Herpothallon
- Species: H. corallinum

Binomial name
- Herpothallon corallinum G.Thor (2009)

Species of lichen

Herpothallon corallinum is a little-known species of corticolous (bark-dwelling), crustose lichen in the family Arthoniaceae. Found in the Democratic Republic of the Congo, it was formally described as new to science in 2009 by the lichenologist Göran Thor. It contains confluentic acid as a major lichen product and various others as minor products and trace metabolites. The species is only known from two old collections, including the type collection, made in 1898, both in a lowland rainforest on the western shore of Lake Tanganyika.
