= Henry Wiley =

Henry Wiley may refer to:

- Henry A. Wiley (1867–1943), U.S. Navy officer
- Henry Orton Wiley (1877–1961), Christian theologian

== See also ==
- Henry Willey (1824–1907), American lichenologist
- Henry Wylie (1844–1918), British Indian Army officer
