= Herpothallon viridi-isidiatum =

Scientific classification
- Domain: Eukaryota
- Kingdom: Fungi
- Division: Ascomycota
- Class: Arthoniomycetes
- Order: Arthoniales
- Family: Arthoniaceae
- Genus: Herpothallon
- Species: H. viridi-isidiatum

Binomial name
- Herpothallon viridi-isidiatum P.F.Chen & L.L.Zhang (2022)

Species of lichen

Herpothallon viridi-isidiatum is a species of crustose lichen in the family Arthoniaceae. Found in China, it was formally described as a new species in 2022 by Pengfei Chen and Lulu Zhang. The type was collected from the Baiyun Protection Station (Jingning County, Zhejiang) at an altitude of almost 1,300 m (4,300 ft); here, the lichen was found growing on the bark of Cunninghamia lanceolata. The species epithet viridi-isidiatum refers to the greenish-coloured pseudisidia. Gyrophoric acid, lecanoric acid, and umbilicaric acid are all lichen products that have been identified in this lichen.
