= Herpothallon globosum =

Scientific classification
- Domain: Eukaryota
- Kingdom: Fungi
- Division: Ascomycota
- Class: Arthoniomycetes
- Order: Arthoniales
- Family: Arthoniaceae
- Genus: Herpothallon
- Species: H. globosum

Binomial name
- Herpothallon globosum G.Thor (2009)

Species of lichen

Herpothallon globosum is a little-known species of corticolous (bark-dwelling), crustose lichen in the family Arthoniaceae. Found in São Tomé and Príncipe, it was formally described as new to science in 2009 by the lichenologist Göran Thor. It contains psoromic acid and chiodectonic acid as major lichen products. The lichen is known only from two old collections made by Moller in 1885, at altitudes of 1,200 and 1,500 m (3,900 and 4,900 ft). The species epithet refers to its numerous globose (spherical) and unbranched isidia.
