= Sulcopyrenula =

Scientific classification
- Kingdom: Fungi
- Division: Ascomycota
- Class: Eurotiomycetes
- Order: Pyrenulales
- Family: Pyrenulaceae
- Genus: Sulcopyrenula; H.Harada (1999)

Type species
- Sulcopyrenula staurospora (Tuck. ex Willey) H.Harada (1999)

Species
- S. biseriata S. canellae-albae S. cruciata S. staurospora S. subglobosa

Genus of lichen

Sulcopyrenula is a genus of lichen-forming fungi in the family Pyrenulaceae. It contains five species. Sulcopyrenula is a largely tropical American genus with a single outlier in East Asia, and all five species share a preference for relatively undisturbed, humid bark substrates—whether in savanna woodland, rainforest or shaded montane hardwood stands.

== Taxonomy ==
Sulcopyrenula was circumscribed in 1999 by the Japanese lichenologist Hiroshi Harada after he recognised that a set of bark-dwelling pyrenocarpous lichens with deeply grooved (sulcate) spores could not be accommodated within Pyrenula (in the strict sense). Harada placed the genus in the family Pyrenulaceae on account of its solitary, flask-shaped perithecia with hyphal walls, the presence of true paraphyses, cylindrical bitunicate asci that lack an ocular chamber, and distoseptate spores produced in partnership with a Trentepohlia-type photobiont. The generic name combines sulco-, referring to the longitudinal groove on each ascospore face, with Pyrenula, the genus it most closely resembles morphologically. Harada designated Sulcopyrenula staurospora as the type species.

At the time of its description the genus comprised two species: the type, transferred from Pyrenula staurospora, and S. canellae-albae, which Harada recombined from Pyrenula canellae-albae. Both species had previously been shuttled among pyrenocarpous genera such as Anthracothecium and Verrucaria, reflecting historical uncertainty about their affinities. Harada showed that the pair share the diagnostic sulcate, eight-locular spores that set Sulcopyrenula apart from Pyrenula—whose otherwise similar species have smooth distoseptate spores—thereby justifying their segregation in a separate genus.

== Description ==
Sulcopyrenula forms an almost invisible body (thallus) that sits inside the outer bark of its host tree (an endophloeodal thallus). Externally it appears only as a faint, smooth, pale brown-grey sheen and lacks any thick, layered cortex. The lichen partners with a Trentepohlia-type alga—an orange-pigmented green alga common in tropical bark lichens—to provide photosynthates, but the algal layer is sparse because most of the fungus is embedded in the wood.

Its reproductive structures are solitary, flask-shaped perithecia that sit about one-third to three-quarters deep in the bark and reach up to roughly 0.5 mm across. Each perithecium is black and glossy with a rounded top that bears a minute apical pore (ostiole) through which spores are released. A thin, carbonised cap (clypeus) merges into a dark brown exciple (perithecial wall). Inside, the spore-bearing layer (hymenium) is lined by short sterile threads (periphyses) and simple, non-gelatinous paraphyses. In S. canellae-albae the hymenium contains conspicuous yellow oil droplets, whereas in S. staurospora it is clear.

The asci are bitunicate (double-walled) cylinders that lack an ocular chamber and usually contain eight spores. Mature ascospores are dark brown, thick-walled and distoseptate—each spore is divided by an internal wall as well as by transverse partitions, giving eight locules in total. A diagnostic feature of the genus is that every spore is deeply sulcate: a longitudinal groove runs along both flattened faces, with a corresponding internal septum. Spore dimensions range from 9–15 × 5–8 × 4–5 μm in S. canellae-albae to 12–22 × 8–12 × 6–10 μm in S. staurospora. No asexual reproductive structures (pycnidia) have been observed to occur in the genus.

== Habitat and distribution ==
Species of Sulcopyrenula are strictly corticolous—they live inside a thin layer of the host tree's outer bark and never venture onto rock or soil. The original two species occupy warm, humid environments: S. canellae-albae grows on hardwoods in low-lying swamp forests of the south-eastern United States and has also been reported from tropical South America, while S. staurospora ranges from similar sites in the southern USA southwards to French Guiana and, unexpectedly, eastwards to cool-temperate valleys of central Japan, where it colonises smooth‐barked deciduous trunks in persistently damp ravines between about 1150 and 1480 m elevation. In all cases the lichen's thallus is immersed, so the tree surface shows little more than a faint grey-brown sheen and scattered black perithecia.

Three later-described species broaden the genus' Neotropical footprint but keep to bark. S. biseriata is known only from white-sand savannas in Guyana, where it dots the smooth bark of scattered woody plants alongside other pyrenocarpous lichens. S. cruciata was discovered on soft bark in the montane Atlantic forest of Minas Gerais, Brazil, and is endemic to that region. The nearly spherical-spored S. subglobosa is a seldom-collected Neotropical species, with records scattered across lowland rainforest localities from Central to northern South America.

== Species ==
- Sulcopyrenula biseriata Aptroot & Sipman (2018)
- Sulcopyrenula canellae-albae (Fée) H.Harada (1999)
- Sulcopyrenula cruciata Aptroot (2002)
- Sulcopyrenula staurospora (Tuck. ex Willey) H.Harada (1999)
- Sulcopyrenula subglobosa (Riddle) Aptroot (2011)
