= Herpothallon rubromaculatum =

Scientific classification
- Domain: Eukaryota
- Kingdom: Fungi
- Division: Ascomycota
- Class: Arthoniomycetes
- Order: Arthoniales
- Family: Arthoniaceae
- Genus: Herpothallon
- Species: H. rubromaculatum

Binomial name
- Herpothallon rubromaculatum G.Thor (2009)

Species of lichen

Herpothallon rubromaculatum is a species of corticolous (bark-dwelling), crustose lichen in the family Arthoniaceae. Found in tropical rainforests of Peru and Venezuela, it was formally described as new to science in 2009 by the lichenologist Göran Thor. It contains neodiffractic acid as a major lichen product, and confluentic acid as a minor component.
