= Herpothallon brialmonticum =

Scientific classification
- Kingdom: Fungi
- Division: Ascomycota
- Class: Arthoniomycetes
- Order: Arthoniales
- Family: Arthoniaceae
- Genus: Herpothallon
- Species: H. brialmonticum

Binomial name
- Herpothallon brialmonticum Aptroot & Elix (2009)

Species of lichen

Herpothallon brialmonticum is a little-known species of corticolous (bark-dwelling), crustose lichen in the family Arthoniaceae. Found in Suriname, it was formally described as new to science in 2009 by the lichenologists André Aptroot and John Elix. The species epithet refers to the three novel lichen products found in the lichen: brialmontic acid, methylbrialmontic acid, and dimethylbrialmontic acid. In addition to these compounds, all related to brialmontin 2, the lichen also has confluentic acid as a major secondary metabolite. This neotropical lichen is only known to occur at the type locality.
