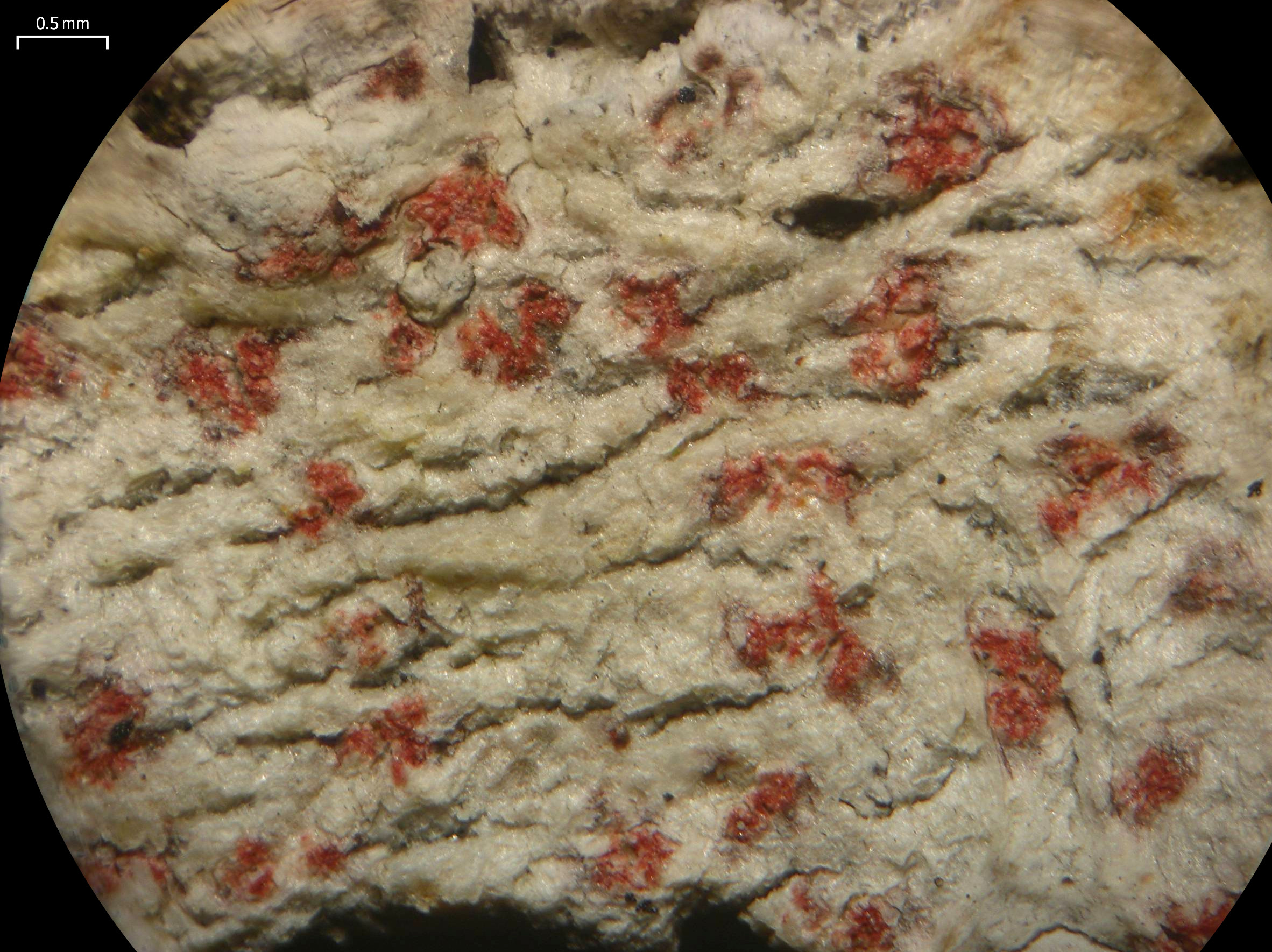
- C. pyrrhula on Myrica, Chincoteague National Wildlife Refuge

Scientific classification
- Kingdom: Fungi
- Division: Ascomycota
- Class: Arthoniomycetes
- Order: Arthoniales
- Family: Arthoniaceae
- Genus: Coniarthonia; Grube (2001)

Type species
- Coniarthonia pyrrhula (Nyl.) Grube (2001)

= Coniarthonia =

Genus of lichen-forming fungi

Coniarthonia is a genus of lichen-forming fungi in the family Arthoniaceae. The genus comprises about fourteen species of crustose lichens that grow on tree bark, mainly in tropical and subtropical regions. They are distinguished by their powdery, crimson to scarlet fruiting bodies, which contain abundant crystallized red pigments, a feature that sets them apart from other lichens in the order Arthoniales. The genus was established in 2001 by the Austrian lichenologist Martin Grube, who separated these species from the large, variable genus Arthonia.

== Taxonomy ==
Coniarthonia was circumscribed as a new genus by Martin Grube in 2001, during a broader reassessment of species that had traditionally been placed in the large and variable genus Arthonia (and, to a lesser extent, Arthothelium). Grube recognised a coherent set of bark-dwelling, crustose lichens that did not sit comfortably in any existing genus of the Arthoniales, and he separated them as Coniarthonia within the family Arthoniaceae. The type species is Coniarthonia pyrrhula, a taxon previously known as Arthonia pyrrhula.

Grube's decision relied on a combination of characters rather than on ascospore septation alone. The ascomata are often weakly delimited and have a powdery red surface, together with abundant crystallized red pigments dispersed through the upper spore-bearing tissues. Because these ascomata are only weakly gelatinized, they tend to be comparatively hydrophobic and shed water readily. In Grube's view, reliance on ascospore septation had led to an overly rigid generic system in Arthoniaceae, and Coniarthonia was therefore treated as a single lineage that includes species with both transversely septate spores and muriform spores. He noted superficial resemblance to some other arthonioid lichens with red pigments, but argued that the pigment chemistry and the anatomy of the fruiting bodies separate Coniarthonia from lookalikes such as members of the Arthonia cinnabarina group, and he also discussed differences from genera such as Cryptothecia and Stirtonia that can have similarly indistinct ascomatal structures.

In establishing the genus, Grube made new combinations for several previously described species (including C. erythrocarpa, C. gregarina, C. pulcherrima, C. pyrrhula, and C. wilmsiana) and described C. haematodea as new to science. The name Coniarthonia was coined with reference to the powdery appearance of the ascomata (from Greek konis, 'dust' or 'powder'), combined with the root used in the name Arthonia.

== Description ==
Species of Coniarthonia are crustose, bark-inhabiting lichens that typically grow as thin, inconspicuous thalli within (or just on) the outermost layers of the substrate. Their photobiont is a trentepohlioid green alga (Trentepohlia), but it can be sparse and the thallus may show little obvious organization beyond a slight disruption of the upper bark tissues.

The fruiting bodies (ascomata) are flat, spot-like patches or short, elongate streaks that are usually poorly delimited at the margins and often have a powdery crimson to scarlet surface. A well-defined exciple is lacking, and the upper spore-bearing layers are only weakly gelatinized, giving the ascomata a comparatively hydrophobic structure. A defining feature of the genus is the abundance of crystallized red pigments, which are distributed through the epithecium and hymenium (and sometimes extend into the hypothecium). The interascal filaments are branched and anastomosing, typically without distinct terminal cells.

Asci are globose to broadly clavate, stalked, and fissitunicate (two-walled), with the lateral walls often thickened and thinning towards the base. Ascospores are hyaline and ellipsoid to slightly obovate, varying across the genus from transversely septate to muriform (with both transverse and longitudinal septa). Grube distinguished two informal morphological groupings: a C. pulcherrima group with comparatively small, 1-septate spores, and a C. pyrrhula group with larger, more heavily septate to muriform spores. Pycnidia have not been reported.

== Habitat and distribution ==
Species of Coniarthonia are lichen-forming and epiphytic, growing on the bark of woody plants. The thallus is often developed within (or just beneath) the outer bark layers and may be inconspicuous, sometimes disrupting the uppermost substrate tissues. The genus is centred in the tropics; in Grube's treatment it was known chiefly from tropical regions, with records that extend into subtropical areas and may reach Mediterranean climates.

== Species ==
As of February 2026, Species Fungorum (in the Catalogue of Life) accepts 14 species of Coniarthonia:

- Coniarthonia aurata E.L.Lima, M.Cáceres & Aptroot (2013) – Brazil
- Coniarthonia echinospora Aptroot (2022) – Brazil
- Coniarthonia eos (Grube, G.Thor & Frisch) Aptroot & Ertz (2015)
- Coniarthonia erythrocarpa (Vain.) Grube (2001)
- Coniarthonia gregarina (Willey) Grube (2001)
- Coniarthonia haematodea Grube (2001)
- Coniarthonia kermesina (R.C.Harris, E.A.Tripp & Lendemer) Aptroot & Ertz (2015)
- Coniarthonia megaspora Aptroot, C.Mendonça & M.Cáceres (2015)
- Coniarthonia micromuralis Aptroot (2022)
- Coniarthonia minima Kalb & Aptroot (2018)
- Coniarthonia pulcherrima (Müll.Arg.) Grube (2001)
- Coniarthonia pyrrhula (Nyl.) Grube (2001)
- Coniarthonia rosea Aptroot & M.Cáceres (2014)
- Coniarthonia wilmsiana (Müll.Arg.) Grube (2001)
