= Herpothallon minimum =

Scientific classification
- Domain: Eukaryota
- Kingdom: Fungi
- Division: Ascomycota
- Class: Arthoniomycetes
- Order: Arthoniales
- Family: Arthoniaceae
- Genus: Herpothallon
- Species: H. minimum

Binomial name
- Herpothallon minimum Aptroot & Lücking (2009)

Species of lichen

Herpothallon minimum is a species of corticolous (bark-dwelling), crustose lichen in the family Arthoniaceae. Originally described from specimens collected in Costa Rica, the lichen was formally described as new to science in 2009 by the lichenologists André Aptroot and Robert Lücking. It is also found in Africa and South America, in lower-elevation mountainous rainforests. Herpothallon minimum is the only species of Herpothallon that produces the substance 2'-O-methylperlatolic acid as its major secondary metabolite.
