= Coniarthonia aurata =

Scientific classification
- Kingdom: Fungi
- Division: Ascomycota
- Class: Arthoniomycetes
- Order: Arthoniales
- Family: Arthoniaceae
- Genus: Coniarthonia
- Species: C. aurata

Binomial name
- Coniarthonia aurata E.L.Lima, M.Cáceres & Aptroot (2013)

Species of lichen-forming fungus

Coniarthonia aurata is a species of crustose lichen-forming fungus in the family Arthoniaceae. It is characterized by its mustard-yellow, hemispherical fruiting structures that give the thallus a granular appearance. The species is known from northeastern Brazil, where it grows on tree bark in Caatinga vegetation.

== Taxonomy ==
Coniarthonia aurata was described as a new species in 2013 from northeastern Brazil, based on material collected in Vale do Catimbau National Park (Pernambuco) on tree bark at about 900 m (3,000 ft) elevation. The holotype (E. L. Lima 684) is housed in ISE.

The authors placed the species (somewhat schematically) in Coniarthonia because it matches the genus in its weakly differentiated, hydrophobic-looking ascigerous (ascus-producing) structures, club-shaped asci, and single-septum ascospores, as well as the presence of pigmented crystals in the ascoma. It differs from previously known species in the genus by having mustard-yellow (rather than red) crystals, and it is further distinguished by its unusual "soralium-like" fruiting structures that contain loosely arranged asci. In overall appearance it can resemble a sterile Tylophoron (whitish thallus with spot-like patches), but C. aurata is fertile and the patches are mustard yellow rather than nearly black.

== Description ==
The thallus of Coniarthonia aurata is crustose, very thin, nearly white, and closely appressed to the bark; it lacks a cortex and a visible prothallus. The photobiont is a trentepohlioid green alga.

The ascigerous structures are sessile, hemispherical, mustard yellow, and about 0.2–0.4 mm in diameter, giving the thallus a sorediate or "soralium-like" look at first glance. The asci are clavate (about 60–70 × 23–28 μm) with the upper part of the wall thickened, and the hamathecium consists of curled, anastomosing hyphae encrusted with golden crystals. Each ascus contains eight hyaline ascospores that have a single septum (1-septate) and are club-shaped (clavate) (about 20–28 × 7–11 μm), with the upper cell much larger than the lower, and without a perispore. Pycnidia were not observed.

In spot tests, the ascigerous structures were UV−, C−, and P−, with a K+ (purple) reaction. Thin-layer chromatography detected an anthraquinone.

== Habitat and distribution ==
The species is corticolous, occurring on smooth bark of trees in Caatinga vegetation. The type collection was made on moderately rain-exposed (not sheltered) bark.

In the type locality it was reported growing with several other crustose lichens, including Acanthothecis abaphoides, Chrysothrix xanthina, Dirinaria leopoldii, Glyphis scyphulifera, Graphis furcata, Lecanora leprosa, Phaeographis ventosa, and Ramboldia haematites. Originally described from collections made in Pernambuco, C. aurata was later recorded from Mato Grosso do Sul.
