= Herpothallon polyisidiatum =

Scientific classification
- Domain: Eukaryota
- Kingdom: Fungi
- Division: Ascomycota
- Class: Arthoniomycetes
- Order: Arthoniales
- Family: Arthoniaceae
- Genus: Herpothallon
- Species: H. polyisidiatum

Binomial name
- Herpothallon polyisidiatum P.F.Chen & L.L.Zhang (2022)

Species of lichen

Herpothallon polyisidiatum is a species of corticolous (bark-dwelling), crustose lichen in the family Arthoniaceae. Found in China, it was formally described as a new species in 2022 by Pengfei Chen and Lulu Zhang. The type was collected from Mangshan National Forest Park (Qingyuan, Guangdong) at an elevation of 1,716 m (5,630 ft). The lichen contains stictic acid, a lichen product that can be detected using thin-layer chromatography. The species epithet refers to polyisidiatum refers to the pseudisidia, which are plentiful in this species.
