= Coniarthonia echinospora =

Scientific classification
- Kingdom: Fungi
- Division: Ascomycota
- Class: Arthoniomycetes
- Order: Arthoniales
- Family: Arthoniaceae
- Genus: Coniarthonia
- Species: C. echinospora

Binomial name
- Coniarthonia echinospora Aptroot (2022)
- Holotype: Reserva Cristalino, Mato Grosso, Brazil

Species of lichen-forming fungus

Coniarthonia echinospora is a corticolous (bark-dwelling) lichen in the family Arthoniaceae. Described in 2022 from specimens collected in primary rainforest in Mato Grosso, Brazil, this species is distinguished by its spiny-surfaced ascospores that turn brown and accumulate in a powdery mass on top of the fruiting bodies. It forms thin, pale grayish-white crusts on tree bark, with tiny brown disc-shaped fruiting bodies less than 0.3 millimeters across dotting the surface. The species name echinospora refers to the characteristic short spines that ornament its spores, a feature visible under microscopic examination.

== Taxonomy ==
Coniarthonia echinospora was described in 2022 by André Aptroot from material collected on tree bark in primary rainforest in the Reserva Cristalino, Mato Grosso, Brazil, at an elevation of 250 to 350 m (820 to 1,150 ft). The holotype (specimen A. Aptroot 83020) is deposited in the herbarium of the Federal University of Mato Grosso do Sul (CGMS). Within Coniarthonia, the species is distinguished by its brown fruiting bodies (apothecia) and ascospores that become brown, remain on top of the ascomata in a mazaedium, and are ornamented with short spines. Aptroot noted that these characters, together with the crustose thallus and ascoma organization, place the species in the Arthoniaceae and make it a distinct lineage among mazaedium-forming lichens, closest to Coniarthonia in current keys.

== Description ==
The thallus of Coniarthonia echinospora is crustose, continuous, not corticate, dull and pale grayish white. It occupies areas of up to 25 cm (9.8 in) in diameter and less than 0.1 mm thick, and is surrounded by an roughly 0.3 mm-wide brown hyphal prothallus. The photobiont is trentepohlioid. The ascomata are almost punctiform (point-like), superficial on the thallus, 0.1–0.3 mm in diameter and less than 0.1 mm high, with a medium-brown disc and a margin that is not differentiated or only slightly paler. The epithecium is not differentiated, and the hamathecium is not inspersed, with anastomosing paraphysoids that are otherwise indistinct. Asci are pyriform, 16–20 × 9–12 μm, with a wall thickened toward the apex; all structures are IKI-negative, apart from the thallus, which stains weakly blue. Ascospores are produced eight per ascus; they are initially hyaline but soon become brown and remain on top of the ascomata in a mazaedium. The spores are muriform and ellipsoid, with 4–5 transverse and 0–1 longitudinal septa (7–9 lumina visible in optical view), measure 11–12.5 × 5.5–6.5 μm, are ornamented with numerous short spines, and lack a gelatinous sheath. Pycnidia have not been observed. In standard spot tests the thallus is UV−, C−, K−, KC− and P−, whereas the ascomata are UV+ (reddish brown); thin-layer chromatography shows confluentic acid as the main lichen substance.

== Habitat and distribution ==
Coniarthonia echinospora grows on tree bark in primary rainforest in the Reserva Cristalino region of Mato Grosso, Brazil, at elevations of 250 to 350 m (820 to 1,150 ft). As of its original publication, it had not been reported from outside Brazil. No additional occurrences had been reported as of 2025.
