= Herpothallon echinatum =

Scientific classification
- Domain: Eukaryota
- Kingdom: Fungi
- Division: Ascomycota
- Class: Arthoniomycetes
- Order: Arthoniales
- Family: Arthoniaceae
- Genus: Herpothallon
- Species: H. echinatum

Binomial name
- Herpothallon echinatum Aptroot, Lücking & Will-Wolf (2009)

Species of lichen

Herpothallon echinatum is a species of corticolous (bark-dwelling) or lignicolous (wood-dwelling), crustose lichen in the family Arthoniaceae. Originally described from specimens collected in Costa Rica, it was formally described as new to science in 2009 by the lichenologists André Aptroot, Robert Lücking, and Susan Will-Wolf. It has also been recorded from a few locations in Asia and Australasia. It contain psoromic acid as a major lichen product.
