= Herpothallon subglobosum =

Scientific classification
- Domain: Eukaryota
- Kingdom: Fungi
- Division: Ascomycota
- Class: Arthoniomycetes
- Order: Arthoniales
- Family: Arthoniaceae
- Genus: Herpothallon
- Species: H. subglobosum

Binomial name
- Herpothallon subglobosum P.F.Chen & L.L.Zhang (2022)

Species of lichen

Herpothallon subglobosum is a species of corticolous (bark-dwelling), crustose lichen in the family Arthoniaceae. Found in China, it was formally described as a new species in 2022 by Pengfei Chen and Lulu Zhang. The type was collected in Baimaluo (Weixi County, Yunnan) at an elevation of 2,100 m (6,900 ft). The lichen contains gyrophoric acid, lecanoric acid, and umbilicaric acid, which are lichen products that can be detected using thin-layer chromatography. The species epithet subglobosum refers to the somewhat spherical pseudisidia.
