= Coniarthonia micromuralis =

Scientific classification
- Kingdom: Fungi
- Division: Ascomycota
- Class: Arthoniomycetes
- Order: Arthoniales
- Family: Arthoniaceae
- Genus: Coniarthonia
- Species: C. micromuralis

Binomial name
- Coniarthonia micromuralis Aptroot (2022)
- Holotype: Adolfo Ducke Forest Reserve, Brazil

Species of lichen-forming fungus

Coniarthonia micromuralis is a corticolous (bark-dwelling) crustose lichen in the family Arthoniaceae. Described in 2022 from specimens collected in primary rainforest near Manaus in the central Amazon, this species is characterized by its small orange fruiting bodies and lemon-shaped ascospores with multiple internal compartments. It forms thin, pale greenish-gray crusts on tree bark, with tiny point-like fruiting bodies that are often arranged in irregular lines of 5–20 individuals.

== Taxonomy ==
Coniarthonia micromuralis was described in 2022 by André Aptroot from material collected on tree bark in primary rainforest in the Adolfo Ducke Forest Reserve near Manaus, Amazonas, Brazil, at an elevation of about 80 m (260 ft). The holotype (M.E.S. Cáceres 50786 & A. Aptroot) is deposited in the herbarium of the National Institute of Amazonian Research (specimen INPA 284707). Within Coniarthonia, the species is distinguished by its orange fruiting bodies (apothecia) and relatively small, multi-chambered (muriform) spores that are divided by 6–7 cross-walls (septa) in one direction and 0–2 walls in the other, with 12–17 compartments visible under the microscope and a length of 16–19 micrometers (μm).

== Description ==
The thallus of Coniarthonia micromuralis is crustose, continuous, not corticate, dull and pale greenish gray. It occupies areas of up to 3 cm (1.2 in) in diameter while remaining under 0.1 mm thick, and is not surrounded by a conspicuous prothallus. The photobiont is trentepohlioid green alga. The ascomata are almost punctiform (point-like), either solitary or more often arranged in irregular lines of 5–20, superficial on the thallus, 0.1–0.2 mm in diameter and about 0.1 mm high, with an orange disc and a margin that is not differentiated. The uppermost layer of the fruiting body (the epithecium) contains orange crystals, and the tissue supporting the spore-producing structures (the hamathecium) does not contain oil droplets, with branching and fusing sterile filaments (paraphysoids) that are otherwise indistinct. Asci are ovoid, 30–37 × 17–21 μm, with a wall thickened toward the apex; all structures are IKI-negative, apart from the thallus, which stains weakly blue. Ascospores are produced eight per ascus; they are translucent, muriform (multi-chambered) and lemon-shaped (citriform), 6–7-septate in one direction and 0–2-septate in the other, with 12–17 lumina visible in optical view. The spores measure 16–19 × 5.5–6.5 μm, have rather pointed ends, and lack a gelatinous sheath. Pycnidia have not been observed. In standard spot tests the thallus is UV−, C−, K−, KC− and P−, while the orange crystals of the apothecia react K+ (pink) and dissolve; no thin-layer chromatography was carried out because of the small amount of material, but the K-reaction suggests the presence of haematommone.

== Habitat and distribution ==
Coniarthonia micromuralis grows on tree bark in primary rainforest in the Reserva Florestal Adolpho Ducke region near Manaus, Amazonas, Brazil, at about 80 m (260 ft) elevation. As of its original publication, it had not been reported from outside Brazil. No additional occurrences had been reported as of 2025.
