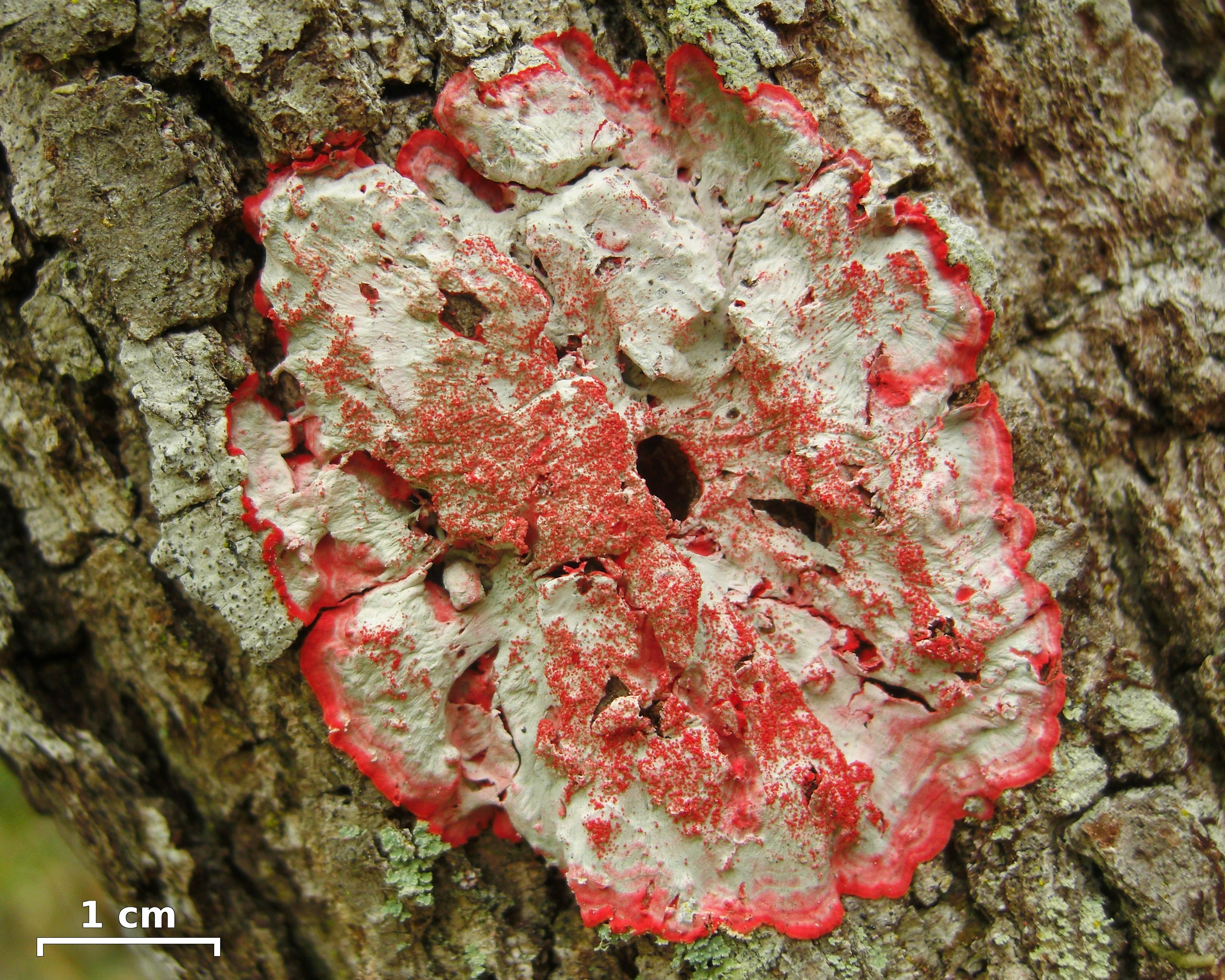
- Herpothallon rubrocinctum

Scientific classification
- Domain: Eukaryota
- Kingdom: Fungi
- Division: Ascomycota
- Class: Arthoniomycetes
- Order: Arthoniales
- Family: Arthoniaceae
- Genus: Herpothallon; Tobler (1937)

Type species
- Herpothallon sanguineum (Vain.) Tobler (1937)

Species
- See text

Synonyms
- Hypochnus Fr. ex Ehrenb. (1820)

= Herpothallon =

Genus of lichens

Herpothallon is a genus of crustose lichens in the family Arthoniaceae. It has about 50 species.

== Taxonomy ==
The genus was circumscribed in 1930 by German lichenologist Friedrich Tobler, with Herpothallon sanguineum assigned as the type species. Tobler erroneously believed that the fungus was a member of the Basidiomycota. After it was recognized as an ascolichen, it was referred to either Chiodecton (family Roccellaceae) or Cryptothecia (family Arthoniaceae).

In 2009, Herpothallon was resurrected following a publication by André Aptroot, Göran Thor, Robert Lücking, and John Elix, in which they recognized 29 species worldwide. The type species is now known as Herpothallon rubrocinctum, or in the vernacular as the "Christmas lichen".

== Description ==
Herpothallon is characterized by the byssoid (a wispy or cottony texture) prothallus (i.e., the first purely fungal layer upon which an algae-containing thallus develops) and hypothallus (i.e., a growth of undifferentiated purely fungal mycelium present as a distinct layer on the underside of the thallus). The texture of the thallus is somewhat felt-like, and its form is heteromerous, meaning that more or less distinct tissues are present, in particular, the mycobiont and photobiont components occur in well-marked layers, with the photobiont in a more or less distinct zone between the upper cortex and the medulla. Another thallus feature common to all species is the felty pseudoisidia; these are isidia-like outgrowths that, unlike true isidia, lack internal differentiation and have no distinct cortex. The thallus also has pustules (blister-like elevations), and granules ranging in form and size from soredia-like to minute. The photobiont partner of the Herpothallon lichen is from Trentepohlia, a genus of green algae. In Herpothallon, the asci do not develop in true ascomata. Only two members of the genus, H. fertile and H. inopinatum, are known to be fertile.

== Species ==
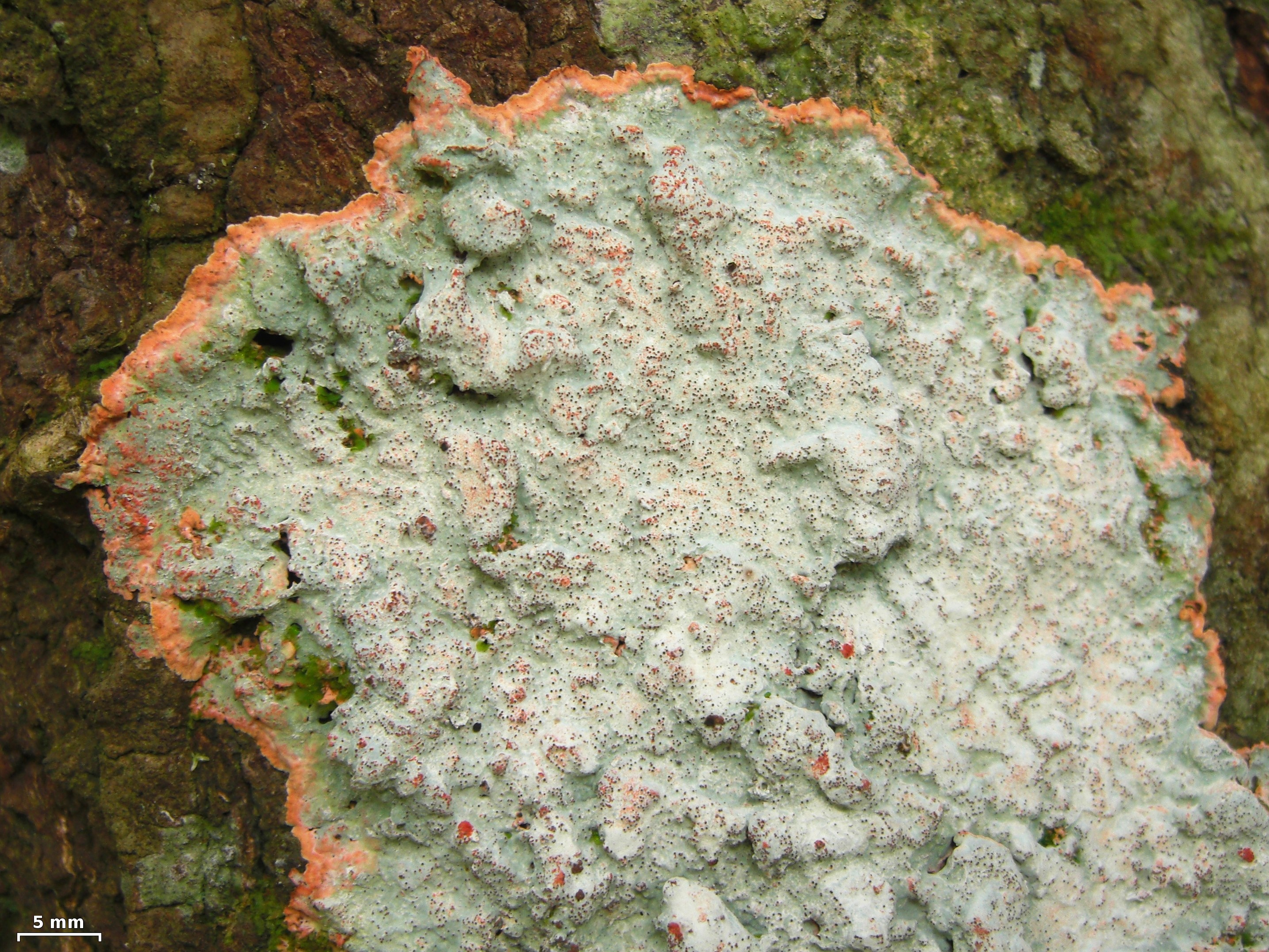
Herpothallon, not identified to species, in Amazonian Peru

As of July 2024, Species Fungorum accepts 49 species of Herpothallon.

- Herpothallon adnatum G.Thor (2009)
- Herpothallon alae Sipman (2018) – Vanuatu
- Herpothallon aurantiacoflavum (B.de Lesd.) Aptroot, Lücking & G.Thor (2009)
- Herpothallon australasicum (Elix) Elix & G.Thor (2009)
- Herpothallon biacidum Frisch, Elix & G.Thor (2010) – Australia
- Herpothallon brialmonticum Aptroot & Elix (2009)
- Herpothallon capilliferum P.F.Chen & L.L.Zhang (2022) – China
- Herpothallon cinereum G.Thor (2009)
- Herpothallon confluenticum Aptroot & Lücking (2009)
- Herpothallon confusum G.Thor (2009)
- Herpothallon corallinum G.Thor (2009)
- Herpothallon coralloides Jagad.Ram (2014) – Andaman Islands
- Herpothallon echinatum Aptroot, Lücking & Will-Wolf (2009)
- Herpothallon elegans G.Thor (2009)
- Herpothallon fertile Aptroot & Lücking (2009)
- Herpothallon flavominutum Jagad.Ram, G.P.Sinha & Elix (2009) – India
- Herpothallon furfuraceum G.Thor (2009)
- Herpothallon glaucescens L.L.Liu & Lu L.Zhang (2023) – China
- Herpothallon globosum G.Thor (2009)
- Herpothallon globuliferum Jagad.Ram (2014) – Andaman Islands
- Herpothallon granulare (Sipman) Aptroot & Lücking (2009)
- Herpothallon granulosum Jagad.Ram & G.P.Sinha (2009) – India
- Herpothallon himalayanum Jagad.Ram & G.P.Sinha (2009) – India
- Herpothallon hypoprotocetraricum G.Thor (2009)
- Herpothallon hyposticticum Bungartz & Elix (2013) – Galápagos Islands
- Herpothallon inopinatum Frisch & G.Thor (2014) – Mexico
- Herpothallon isidiatum Jagad.Ram & G.P.Sinha (2009) – India
- Herpothallon japonicum (Zahlbr.) G.Thor (2009)
- Herpothallon kigeziense Frisch & G.Thor (2013) – Uganda
- Herpothallon lilacinum L.L.Liu & Lu L.Zhang (2023) – China
- Herpothallon lutescens Jagad.Ram (2014) – Andaman Islands
- Herpothallon minimum Aptroot & Lücking (2009)
- Herpothallon minutum Jagad.Ram (2014) – Andaman Islands
- Herpothallon nigroisidiatum G.Thor (2009)
- Herpothallon philippinum (Vain.) Aptroot & Lücking (2009)
- Herpothallon polyisidiatum P.F.Chen & L.L.Zhang (2022) – China
- Herpothallon psorpseudisidiatum Aptroot, L.A.Santos & M.Cáceres (2024) – Brazil
- Herpothallon purpureum Aptroot & M.F.Souza (2021) – Brazil
- Herpothallon pustulatum G.Thor (2009)
- Herpothallon queenslandicum (Elix) Elix (2009)
- Herpothallon roseocinctum (Fr.) Aptroot, Lücking & G.Thor (2009)
- Herpothallon rubrocinctoides (G.Thor) Aptroot, Lücking & G.Thor (2009)
- Herpothallon rubrocinctum (Ehrenb.) Aptroot, Lücking & G.Thor (2009)
- Herpothallon rubroechinatum Frisch & G.Thor (2010)
- Herpothallon rubromaculatum G.Thor (2009)
- Herpothallon saxorum Bungartz & Elix (2013) – Galápagos Islands
- Herpothallon subglobosum P.F.Chen & L.L.Zhang (2022) – China
- Herpothallon tomentosum L.L.Liu & Lu L.Zhang (2023) – China
- Herpothallon tricolor Aptroot & M.Cáceres (2017)
- Herpothallon viridi-isidiatum P.F.Chen & L.L.Zhang (2022) – China
- Herpothallon weii Y.L.Cheng & H.Y.Wang (2012) – China
