= Coniarthonia erythrocarpa =

Scientific classification
- Kingdom: Fungi
- Division: Ascomycota
- Class: Arthoniomycetes
- Order: Arthoniales
- Family: Arthoniaceae
- Genus: Coniarthonia
- Species: C. erythrocarpa

Binomial name
- Coniarthonia erythrocarpa (Vain.) Grube (2001)

Synonyms
- Arthonia erythrocarpa Vain. (1930)

Species of lichen-forming fungus

Coniarthonia erythrocarpa is a species of lichen-forming fungus in the family Arthoniaceae. It is a bark-dwelling lichen with a thin, whitish crust and distinctive crimson-red fruiting bodies, known only from Palma, Mozambique. The species was originally described by Edvard Vainio in 1930 and transferred to Coniarthonia in 2001.

== Taxonomy ==
Coniarthonia erythrocarpa was originally described by the Finnish lichenologist Edvard Vainio in 1930 as Arthonia erythrocarpa. The taxon was based on specimen material collected in Palma, Mozambique, where it was gathered in 1916 on tree bark by the Portuguese botanist Américo Pires de Lima. In a 2001 revision that established the genus Coniarthonia, Martin Grube transferred the species to that genus as Coniarthonia erythrocarpa. A later nomenclatural review of Vainio's Mozambique material clarified the original material of the basionym. It reported that Arthonia erythrocarpa was based on syntype material from Palma, Cabo Delgado, represented by Pires de Lima collections 408 and 867 in the Porto and Turku herbaria, and listed additional original material from the same locality.

In the same 2001 treatment, Grube selected a lectotype from Vainio's original material (TUR-VAIN 29084/1a) and treated additional material from the same collection as isolectotypes (TUR-VAIN 29084/2–4). He also lectotypified Arthonia erythrocarpa var. roseopallens Vain. (lectotype TUR-VAIN 29084/5) and placed that name in synonymy with C. erythrocarpa, interpreting its paler thallus tone as a substrate effect rather than a consistent taxonomic difference. Within Coniarthonia, Grube grouped the species with the small-spored, 1-septate taxa (the "C. pulcherrima group").

== Description ==
The body (thallus) is whitish and develops within the outermost bark layers, forming a thin, spreading crust that is very thin in cross-section (about 10–20 μm) and lacks visible border zone (prothallus) lines. The algal partner (photobiont) is the green alga Trentepohlia, with oval (ellipsoid) cells arranged in short chains.

The fruiting bodies (ascomata) are scattered and typically irregularly elongated to weakly branched, often following ridges in the bark. They are flat to slightly convex (becoming more convex when moist), and the surface is rough and densely frosted with crimson-red pigment (crimson-red pruinose), with darker areas where the spore-bearing structures (asci) are mature. In cross-section, the fruiting bodies are about 90–110 μm thick and lack a sharply defined outer wall (excipulum). The uppermost tissue layer (epithecium) is densely packed with crimson pigment crystals and is described as water-repellent (hydrophobic), while the spore-bearing layer (hymenium) beneath contains progressively fewer crystals. The asci are dispersed, broadly club-shaped (clavate) to nearly spherical (subglobose) with a distinct stalk, and they contain eight ascospores arranged in two to three rows. The ascospores are oblong-oval, colourless (hyaline), and 2-celled (1-septate), measuring about 15–18 × 6.5–7.5 μm, with the upper cell slightly larger. Very old spores may become yellowish brown and faintly roughened.

== Habitat and distribution ==
Coniarthonia erythrocarpa is a bark-dwelling, lichen-forming species. It is known only from the type locality in Mozambique (Palma), collected on tree bark. Detailed secondary chemistry has not been investigated owing to the scarcity of available material.
