= Coniarthonia eos =

Scientific classification
- Kingdom: Fungi
- Division: Ascomycota
- Class: Arthoniomycetes
- Order: Arthoniales
- Family: Arthoniaceae
- Genus: Coniarthonia
- Species: C. eos

Binomial name
- Coniarthonia eos (Grube, G.Thor & Frisch) Aptroot & Ertz (2015)
- Type locality: Hokkaido, Japan

Synonyms
- Arthonia eos Grube, G.Thor & Frisch (2014)

Species of lichen-forming fungus

Coniarthonia eos is a species of lichen-forming fungus in the family Arthoniaceae. It is known only from old-growth montane forest on Hokkaido, where it was found growing on spruce bark.

== Taxonomy ==
Arthonia eos was described as a new species in 2010 by Martin Grube, Göran Thor, and Andreas Frisch, based on material collected in northern Japan on the island of Hokkaido. The holotype specimen was gathered in Kushiro Province, on Mt O-Akan-dake near Lake Akan, from an old-growth montane forest, where it was found on the bark of a very large spruce at about 420–500 m elevation.

The epithet eos (Greek for 'dawn') refers to the striking red color of the ascomata and to the species' discovery in Japan. The species is characterized by its tiny, dome-shaped, scarlet-red fruiting bodies (ascomata) and by 2-celled, "slipper-shaped" (obovate) ascospores.

It was reclassified to the genus Coniarthonia in 2015.

== Description ==
The lichen is only weakly lichenized, with a sparse algal partner (photobiont) of trentepohlioid green algae. The algal cells are rounded to barrel-shaped, arranged in short chains, and measure about 9–14 × 7–14 μm.

The ascomata are bright scarlet red, adnate and strongly convex, hemispherical to slightly elongated, and 0.16–0.30 mm across. Their surface is roughened, and in section they are about 100–110 μm tall. Red pigment occurs as crystals or granular deposits (to about 2 μm across) within the epihymenium, the upper part of the hymenium, and the proper exciple. The proper exciple is well developed and built of mostly upright (anticlinal) hyphae. The epihymenium is about 15–20 μm thick, composed of densely branched and interconnecting (anastomosing) hyphae embedded in a jelly-like matrix, while the hymenium beneath is colourless (hyaline) and about 35–40 μm thick. Below this, the subhymenium (hypothecium) is brown and relatively thick (about 50–60 μm).

The asci are clavate, 8-spored, and of the Arthonia-type, measuring about 38–42 × 11–13 μm, with an indistinct stipe. The ascospores are hyaline, 1-septate, obovate, and 9–14 × 4–5 μm, with the upper cell slightly broader; a gelatinous sheath is absent.

In chemistry, the red crystalline pigment dissolves in K with a scarlet-red color change (reported as either completely dissolving or only partly dissolving). Iodine reactions were also reported for ascomatal gels, and no hemiamyloid tholus structures were observed.

== Habitat and distribution ==
Coniarthonia eos was collected from the flaky bark of spruce (Picea sp.) in an old-growth montane mixed forest on Mt O-Akan-dake, Hokkaido. The forest was described as containing, among other trees, Picea species, maples (Acer spp.), and Japanese oak (Quercus crispula).

The species is known only from the type locality. On the same tree, the collectors also found Melarthonis piceae and a Chrysothrix species (referred to as "Chrysothrix sp. Jp1").

It may be confused with Arthonia kermesiana, which is similar in overall appearance and spore size, but that species differs by having a pale rather than brown-pigmented hypothecium.
