= Sulcopyrenula cruciata =

Scientific classification
- Kingdom: Fungi
- Division: Ascomycota
- Class: Eurotiomycetes
- Order: Pyrenulales
- Family: Pyrenulaceae
- Genus: Sulcopyrenula
- Species: S. cruciata

Binomial name
- Sulcopyrenula cruciata Aptroot (2002)

Species of lichen-forming fungus

Sulcopyrenula cruciata is a species of crustose lichen-forming fungus in the family Pyrenulaceae. It was described from Brazil, where the type locality is in Serra do Caraça, Minas Gerais, at an elevation of 1,300 m (4,300 ft). As of 2025, it had not been documented from any additional Brazilian states.

The lichen grows on exposed soft bark and, in the type collection, was found without accompanying species. It has a whitish, crust-like thallus that is almost immersed in the bark and lacks both pseudocyphellae and a hypothallus. Its black perithecia are mostly immersed in the thallus, and its ascospores are brown, grooved, and consistently divided into four spindle-shaped (fusiform) chambers arranged in two rows. The species also contains lichexanthone, detected by its yellow ultraviolet fluorescence. Within Sulcopyrenula, it is distinctive in combining lichexanthone with consistently four-loculate ascospores; it resembles Anthracothecium subglobosum in sharing those general features, but differs in having narrower, grooved spores and a clear rather than inspersed (i.e., containing oil-droplets) hamathecium.

== See also ==
- List of lichens of Brazil
