= Herpothallon hyposticticum =

Scientific classification
- Kingdom: Fungi
- Division: Ascomycota
- Class: Arthoniomycetes
- Order: Arthoniales
- Family: Arthoniaceae
- Genus: Herpothallon
- Species: H. hyposticticum

Binomial name
- Herpothallon hyposticticum Bungartz & Elix (2013)
- Holotype: Santa Cruz Island, the Galápagos

Species of lichen

Herpothallon hyposticticum is a species of crustose lichen in the family Arthoniaceae. This lichen forms a greyish-white to pale yellowish crust primarily on tree bark and occasionally on rock surfaces. It reproduces mainly through vegetative structures rather than spores. Initially thought to be endemic to the Galápagos Islands, where it grows from the upper transition zone to the humid zone on both native and introduced trees in semi-shaded to shaded environments, the species' known range was expanded when it was recorded in Florida in 2014.

== Taxonomy ==
Herpothallon hyposticticum belongs to the genus Herpothallon, which was segregated from the closely related genus Cryptothecia in 2009. The species name hyposticticum refers to the presence of hypostictic and hyposalazinic acids in the lichen, secondary metabolites that are unusual in this genus as they typically occur as accessory substances to other compounds (stictic acid and norstictic acid) which are absent in this species.

The species is morphologically unusual within the genus, showing significant variation in its growth form. It is distinguished from other members of the genus by its unique chemistry and the characteristic weak blue staining reaction of its medulla (inner tissue) with iodine.

== Description ==
Herpothallon hyposticticum forms a crust-like thallus (lichen body) that grows on bark and occasionally on rock surfaces. It is delimited by an inconspicuous, dense white prothallus (margin of fungal tissue). The main surface of the thallus appears greyish white, developing a beige to pale yellowish colouration as it ages.

The thallus lacks a cortex (protective outer layer), giving it an ecorticate appearance that can range from thin and loosely woven (arachnoid) to moderately thickened, compact, and sometimes developing cracks (rimose). The surface is covered with small reproductive structures called pseudisidia, which can appear as minute granules or develop into more distinct cylindrical projections approximately 50–80 μm in diameter. These pseudisidia are fairly uniform in size and may be sparse or abundant depending on the specimen. No reproductive structures producing spores (asci) or conidia (pycnidia) have been observed in this species, suggesting it reproduces primarily through vegetative means.

The internal structure (medulla) is white and contains sparse calcium oxalate crystals. When tested with chemical reagents, the thallus shows no is P−, K+ (yellow), and C−. Under ultraviolet light, it is UV+ (bright yellow). A distinctive characteristic is that parts of the medulla react weakly blue with Lugol's iodine solution, a feature unusual in the genus Herpothallon. Chemical analysis reveals the presence of hypostictic and hyposalazinic acids, which is notable as these substances are typically accessories to other lichen substances that are absent in this species.

== Habitat and distribution ==
Herpothallon hyposticticum was originally described from the Galápagos Islands, which suggested that it could be endemic to the archipelago. It occurs from the upper transition zone to the humid zone of the islands. The species grows primarily on the bark of both native or endemic trees (such as Pisonia floribunda, Zanthoxylon fagara, and Scalesia pedunculata) and introduced species (including Cinchona pubescens and Persea americana). It prefers semi-shaded to shaded, sheltered habitats. One specimen has also been found growing on a shaded rock overhang. Its known distribution was greatly expanded when it was recorded from Florida's Everglades National Park in 2014.

The distribution pattern of H. hyposticticum in the Galapagos is similar to other lichens that reproduce primarily through vegetative means rather than spores, such as species in the genus Lepraria.
