= Herpothallon rubroechinatum =

Scientific classification
- Kingdom: Fungi
- Division: Ascomycota
- Class: Arthoniomycetes
- Order: Arthoniales
- Family: Arthoniaceae
- Genus: Herpothallon
- Species: H. rubroechinatum

Binomial name
- Herpothallon rubroechinatum Frisch & G.Thor (2010)
- Holotype: Glades County, Florida

Species of lichen

Herpothallon rubroechinatum is a species of corticolous (bark-dwelling), crustose lichen in the family Arthoniaceae. It is distinguished by its greyish-white to beige thallus and distinctive rust-red crystals that appear sprinkled on its reproductive structures. The species contains psoromic acid and reproduces primarily through vegetative means rather than spores. Initially documented in Florida, Costa Rica, and Peru, its known range expanded to the Galápagos Islands in 2013, where it inhabits the humid zone of Santa Cruz Island, growing on both native endemic trees and introduced species in semi-shaded to shaded environments.

== Taxonomy ==
Herpothallon rubroechinatum was formally described as a new species in 2010 by the lichenologists Andreas Frisch and Göran Thor. The type specimen was collected from Florida, where it was found growing on bark in a swamp forest about 10 km (6.2 mi) west of the east end of Lake Okeechobee. The specific epithet rubroechinatum refers to the distinctive rust-red pigment crystals found on the pseudisidia, which appear as if they were sprinkled on the surface of these structures.

Herpothallon rubroechinatum belongs to the genus Herpothallon, which was separated from the closely related genus Cryptothecia in 2009. This genus is characterized by cottony-byssoid (loosely woven, fuzzy) crusts that typically lack reproductive structures containing spores. Instead, most species in the genus reproduce through vegetative pseudisidia.

== Description ==
Herpothallon rubroechinatum forms a crust-like growth on tree bark (corticolous). The thallus (lichen body) is clearly defined by a distinct border of white, radiating fungal filaments (hyphae) that typically contain at least some rust-red pigmentation. The main surface of the thallus appears greyish white, becoming beige with age, and lacks a protective outer layer (cortex).

The thallus texture is cottony, in some areas appearing almost granular. The central part of the thallus is densely covered with slightly darker, compact reproductive structures called pseudisidia. These pseudisidia appear as if they were sprinkled with rust-red, needle-shaped pigment crystals, which is a distinctive characteristic of this species.

The pseudisidia come in two forms (dimorphic): some are swollen and globular, containing a central pycnidium (structure producing asexual spores), while others develop into elongated, worm-like forms. The internal tissue (medulla) is white, containing brownish granules and sparse calcium oxalate crystals.

When tested with chemical spot tests, the green-white parts of the thallus are K−, but the rust-red portions are (K+) purple. The thallus is P+ (bright yellow), C−, and KC−. It does not fluoresce under ultraviolet light (UV−), and shows no staining reaction with iodine (I−). Chemical analysis reveals the presence of psoromic acid, which gives the species its P+ (yellow) reaction.

== Habitat and distribution ==
Herpothallon rubroechinatum has a neotropical distribution, occurring in tropical regions of the Americas. It was documented in the Galápagos Islands in 2013, representing a new record for both the archipelago and Ecuador. In the Galápagos, the few known specimens were collected in the humid zone of Santa Cruz Island, growing on both native endemic trees such as Scalesia pedunculata and introduced trees including Cinchona pubescens and Cedrela odorata. It prefers semi-shaded to shaded and sheltered habitats. The lichen is also found in Costa Rica and Peru.
