= Herpothallon fertile =

Scientific classification
- Domain: Eukaryota
- Kingdom: Fungi
- Division: Ascomycota
- Class: Arthoniomycetes
- Order: Arthoniales
- Family: Arthoniaceae
- Genus: Herpothallon
- Species: H. fertile

Binomial name
- Herpothallon fertile Aptroot & Lücking (2009)

Species of lichen

Herpothallon fertile is a species of corticolous (bark-dwelling), crustose lichen in the family Arthoniaceae. Originally described from specimens collected in Costa Rica, it was formally described as new to science in 2009 by the lichenologists André Aptroot and Robert Lücking. It also occurs in Brazil, and is considered by the authors to have a wide distribution in "tropical parts of America". Its species epithet fertile reflects the fact that it is the only species of Herpothallon to have been found with asci and ascospores.
