= Herpothallon granulare =

Scientific classification
- Kingdom: Fungi
- Division: Ascomycota
- Class: Arthoniomycetes
- Order: Arthoniales
- Family: Arthoniaceae
- Genus: Herpothallon
- Species: H. granulare

Binomial name
- Herpothallon granulare (Sipman) Aptroot & Lücking (2009)

Synonyms
- Cryptothecia granularis Sipman (2003)

Species of lichen

Herpothallon granulare is a species of lichen-forming fungus in the family Arthoniaceae. It forms distinctive white and greenish-grey growths primarily on trees in tropical regions worldwide. This lichen reproduces mainly through vegetative means rather than spores, and is particularly common in the Galápagos Islands where it grows in semi-shaded to shaded environments from the transition zones through humid areas. It has also been documented in India, Sri Lanka, and other tropical locations, where it grows on various native and introduced trees, occasionally appearing on leaves.

== Taxonomy ==
The species was originally placed in the genus Cryptothecia by Harrie Sipman in 2003. The type specimen was collected in Singapore. Following a revision of the genus by André Aptroot and colleagues in 2009, it was transferred to Herpothallon. The genus Herpothallon contains fungi that form conspicuous cottony-byssoid crusts with trentepohlioid photobionts (green algae partners) and reproduce primarily through vegetative means rather than through sexual reproduction.

== Description ==
Herpothallon granulare forms a distinctive growth pattern characterized by broad white prothallus (the outermost, algae-free part of the lichen thallus) composed of loosely radiating fibrous strands of white hyphae (fungal filaments). The main thallus surface appears greenish grey to dull green, becoming paler with age. Unlike many lichens, H. granulare lacks a cortex (protective outer layer), giving it an ecorticate appearance.

The entire thallus is composed of thick fibrous strands of loosely interwoven fungal hyphae. It is abundantly covered with coarsely granular pseudisidia (vegetative reproductive structures that resemble isidia but lack internal differentiation). These structures give the lichen a granular appearance. The medulla (inner layer) is poorly differentiated and indistinct, with hyphae covered by colourless to pale brownish granules, but lacking calcium oxalate crystals. Neither asci (spore-producing structures) nor pycnidia (asexual reproductive structures) have been observed in this species, indicating it reproduces primarily through vegetative means.

In chemical spot tests, the thallus does not react with the reagents P, K, C, or KC, and does not fluoresce under ultraviolet light. It also tests negative with Lugol's iodine solution. Chemical analysis reveals the presence of perlatolic acid.

The Indian endemic Herpothallon granulosum is similar in appearance, but this lichen contains barbatic acid (rather than perlatolic acid) as its main secondary metabolite.

== Habitat and distribution ==
Herpothallon granulare has a pantropical distribution, occurring in tropical regions around the world. It was documented in the Galápagos Islands in 2009, representing a new record for both the archipelago and Ecuador. In the Galápagos, it is one of the most common species in its genus, found from the upper transition zone through the humid zone and into the high-altitude transition zone. It grows on a wide variety of both native and introduced trees, typically preferring semi-shaded to shaded and sheltered habitats. Occasionally, it may also be found growing on leaves. It has also been documented from the Andaman Islands, from the Agasthyamalai Biosphere Reserve in Kerala, India, and from Sri Lanka.

The species is part of a diverse lichen community in the Galápagos that includes several other members of the genus Herpothallon and related genera. Its ecology is comparable to other lichen genera like Lepraria that inhabit humid, sheltered habitats and reproduce primarily through vegetative propagules rather than spores.
