= Oswald Hesse =

German chemist (1835–1917)

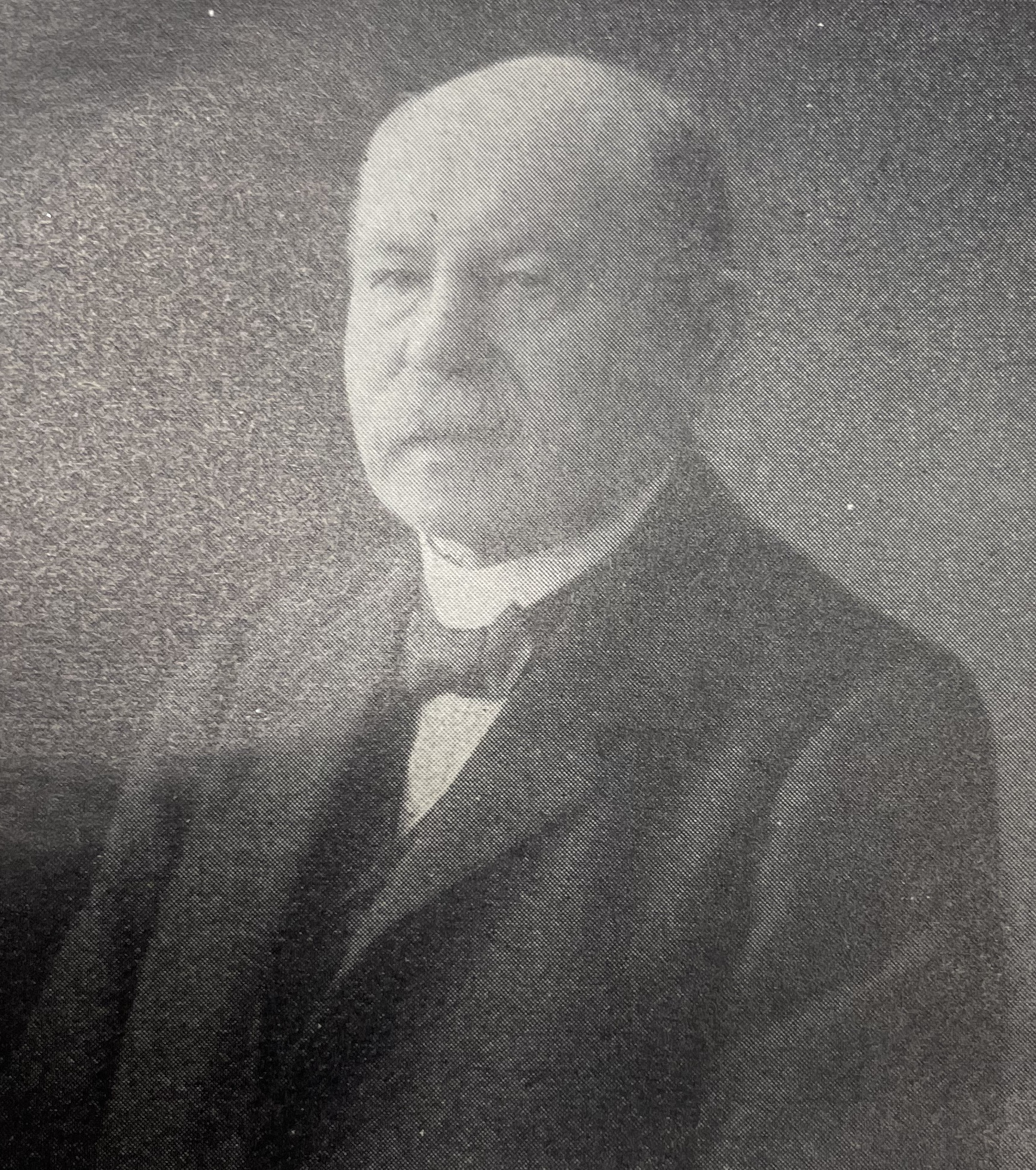
- Born: 17 May 1835
- Died: 10 February 1917 (aged 81)
- Education: University of Göttingen
- Scientific career
- Fields: Chemistry

Julius Oswald Hesse (17 May 1835 – 10 February 1917) was a German chemist. He is known for his research into the secondary metabolites of lichens.

== Life and career ==
Julius Oswald Hesse, born in 1835 in Obereula, Saxony, pursued his studies in chemistry at the Leipzig University. He studied under Heinrich Limpricht with an investigation into quinones. After obtaining his doctorate from the University of Göttingen in 1860, he initially chose a career in the chemical industry rather than academia. However, Hesse's interest soon shifted towards the study of chemical compounds found in plants, with a particular focus on lichens. His extensive research in this field was summarized in his work Flechtenstoffe in Biochemisches Handlexicon, published in 1912. Over the course of his career, Hesse identified 102 secondary metabolites (lichen products) in lichens, documented across nearly 30 scholarly papers. His contributions to the field were later recognized with an honorary professorship. In 1888, Hesse was elected a member of the German National Academy of Sciences Leopoldina. Hesse died in Stuttgart in 1917.

== Selected publications ==
- Hesse, O. (1900). "Beitrag zur Kenntnis der Flechten und ihrer charakteristischen Bestandteile". Journal für praktische Chemie (in German). 62: 430–480. doi:10.1002/prac.19000620127. hdl:2027/hvd.32044106381494.
- Hesse, O. (1911). "Beitrag zur Kenntnis der Flechten und ihrer charakteristischen Bestandteile. 12. Mitteilung". Journal für praktische Chemie (in German). 83: 22–96. doi:10.1002/prac.19100830102.
- Hesse, O. (1912). "Flechtenstoffe". In Abderhalden, E. (ed.). Biochemisches Handlexikon. Berlin/Heidelberg/New York: Springer.
