= Coniarthonia wilmsiana =

Scientific classification
- Kingdom: Fungi
- Division: Ascomycota
- Class: Arthoniomycetes
- Order: Arthoniales
- Family: Arthoniaceae
- Genus: Coniarthonia
- Species: C. wilmsiana

Binomial name
- Coniarthonia wilmsiana (Müll.Arg.) Grube (2001)

Synonyms
- Arthonia wilmsiana Müll. Arg. (1886)

Species of lichen-forming fungus

Coniarthonia wilmsiana is a species of crustose lichen-forming fungus in the family Arthoniaceae. It is a bark-dwelling lichen with a thin, whitish crust and bright crimson, spot-like fruiting bodies, found across the tropics and into the southern hemisphere. The species was originally described from South Africa in 1886 and transferred to Coniarthonia in 2001.

== Taxonomy ==
Coniarthonia wilmsiana was originally described by Johannes Müller Argoviensis in 1886 as Arthonia wilmsiana, based on corticolous material collected near Lydenburg in the Transvaal region of South Africa by Dr Wilms (specimen no. 16) and communicated to Müller by Dr Lahm. Müller described it as having a thin, whitish, crust-like thallus and conspicuously bright purple-crimson apothecia, and distinguished it from superficially similar species by its much larger, differently divided spores. The holotype is housed in the Geneva herbarium (G).

When Martin Grube circumscribed the genus Coniarthonia in 2001 for a group of arthonioid lichens with red, crystal-rich, weakly delimited ascomata, he transferred the species as Coniarthonia wilmsiana. In that treatment, Grube emphasized the species' distinctive ascospore type: hyaline spores that consistently have three septa (3-septate) and have comparatively small end cells (polar cells), a combination that is unusual within the family Arthoniaceae.

== Description ==
The lichen body (thallus) is a thin, whitish crust with a faint greenish tinge that develops in the upper bark layers. It is spreading and typically bordered by dark reddish-brown boundary lines (prothalline lines); the surface looks slightly powdery. The algal partner (photobiont) is from the filamentous green algal genus Trentepohlia, with oval (ellipsoid) cells arranged in short chains.

The fruiting bodies (ascomata) are scattered and usually irregularly spot-like rather than distinctly elongated, mostly 0.24–1.4 mm across but occasionally reaching 1.8 mm. They lie more or less level with the thallus, becoming slightly convex, and are densely frosted with crimson pigment (pruina). Under the microscope, the outer wall (excipulum) is poorly defined. The uppermost tissue layer (epithecium) contains abundant crimson crystals (with a smaller amount of colorless crystals) and is described as water-repellent (hydrophobic), while the spore-bearing layer (hymenium) below has fewer crystals. The asci are widely dispersed and may contain 4, 6, or 8 spores. The ascospores are colorless (hyaline), oval to pear-shaped (ellipsoid to obovate), and 4-celled (3-septate), often surrounded by a gelatinous sheath that swells in KOH (potassium hydroxide solution).

The reddish pigments dissolve in K (KOH solution) and give a purplish-orange reaction, and Grube reported several pigment fractions (Pyr1–Pyr3 and Hae2) detected by thin-layer chromatography, plus an additional trace pigment.

== Habitat and distribution ==
Coniarthonia wilmsiana is an epiphytic, lichen-forming species on smooth bark. It has been reported from Martinique, Central America, South America, southern Africa, and Australia, indicating a broadly tropical to southern-hemispheric distribution.

Based on documented collections and Grube's remarks, it can occur in relatively open sites and may tolerate drier conditions, and it appears to be more common than the sparse literature might suggest (similar in that respect to the type species of the genus, C. pyrrhula).
