= Jingning She Autonomous County =

Jingning 景宁县
- Autonomous county
- 景宁畲族自治县; Jingning She Autonomous County
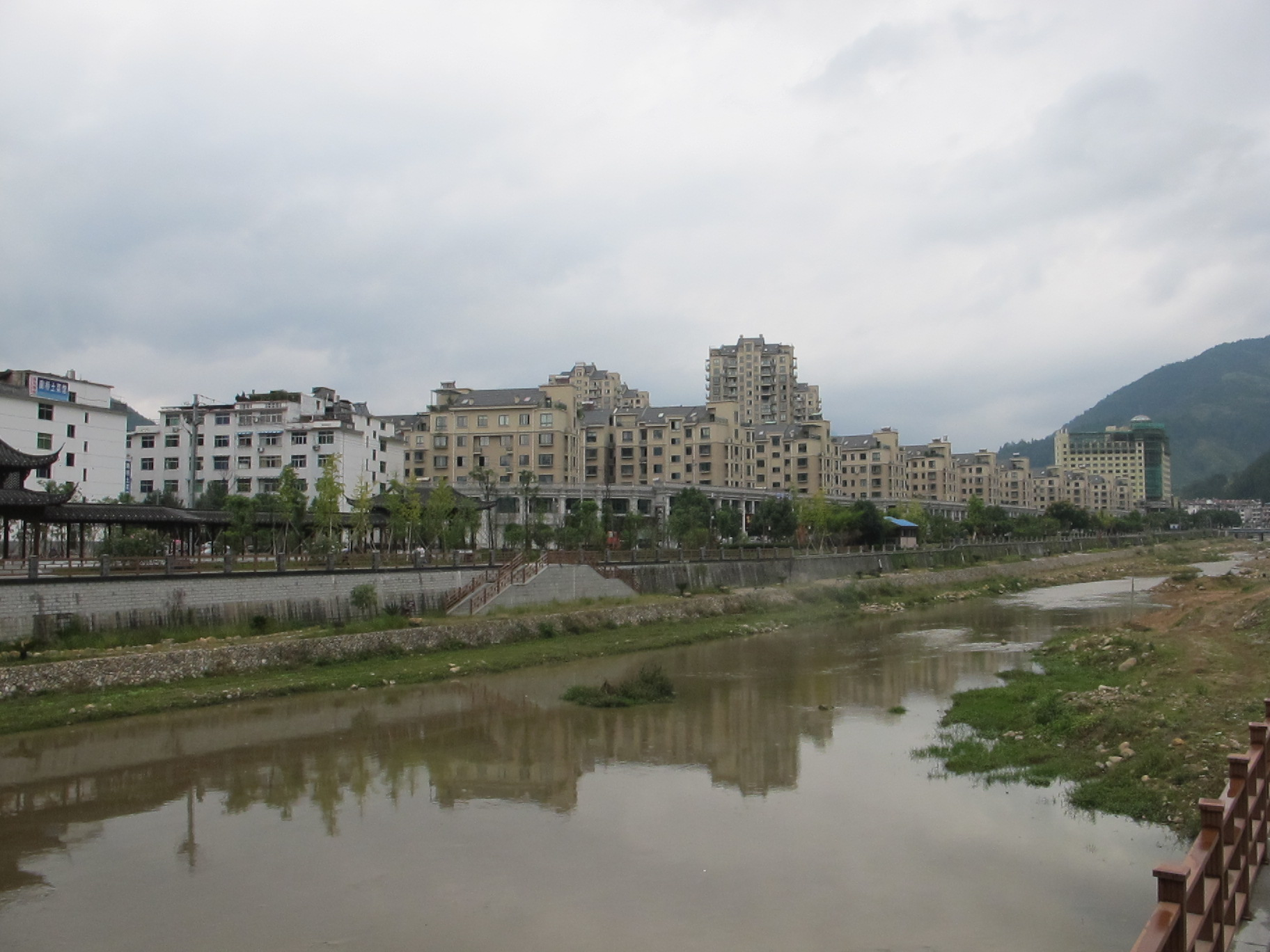
- Central Jingning

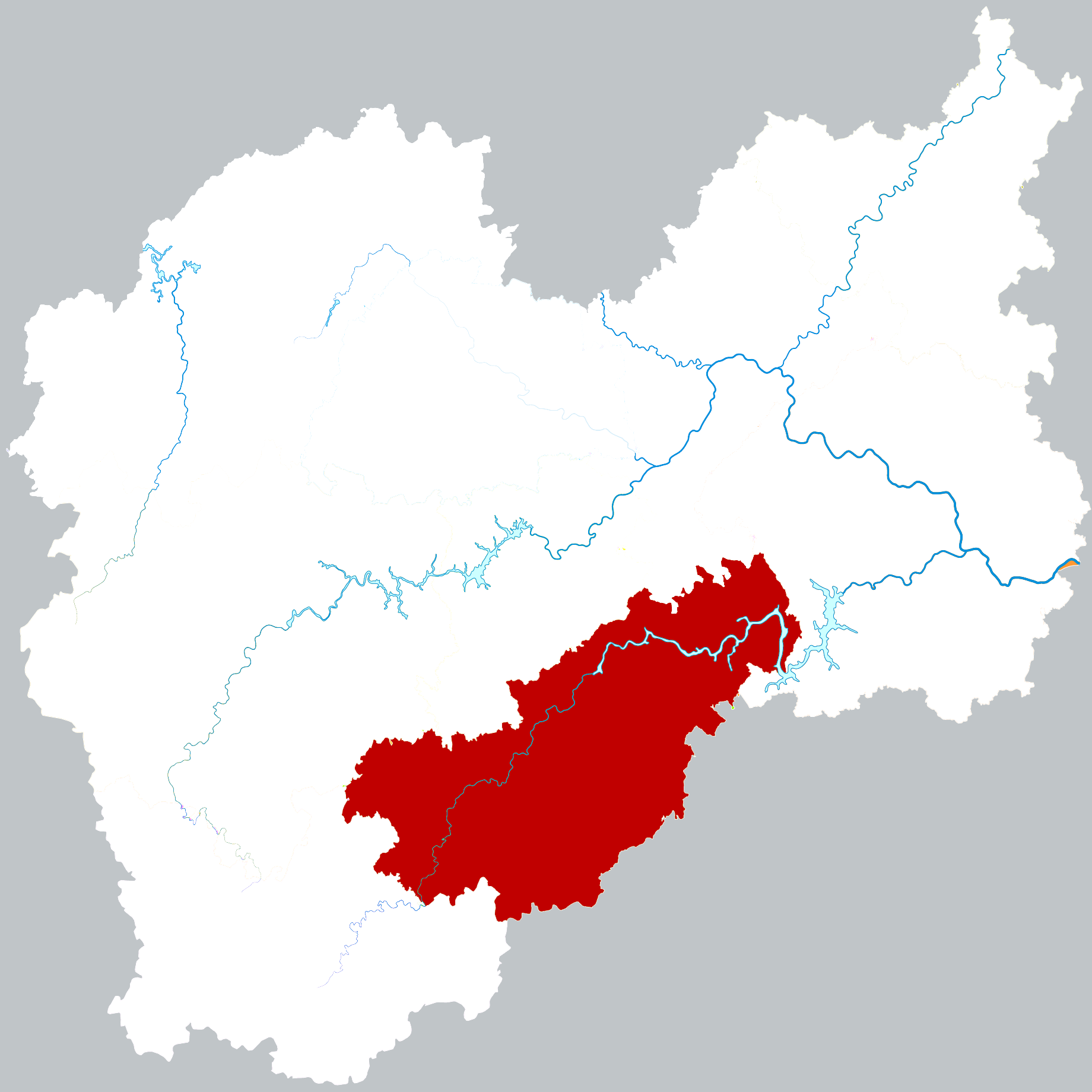
- Location of Jingning County within Lishui

- Location of the seat in Zhejiang
- Coordinates: 27°58′15″N 119°38′21″E
- Country: People's Republic of China
- Province: Zhejiang
- Prefecture-level city: Lishui
- County seat: Hexi Subdistrict

Area
  - Total: 1,938.84 km^{2} (748.59 sq mi)

Population (2022)
  - Total: 111,000
  - Density: 57.3/km^{2} (148/sq mi)
- Time zone: UTC+8 (China Standard)
- Website: www.jingning.gov.cn

Jingning She Autonomous County (simplified Chinese: 景宁畲族自治县; traditional Chinese: 景寧畬族自治縣; pinyin: Jǐngníng Shēzú Zìzhìxiàn) is an autonomous county for the She people, under the jurisdiction of the prefecture-level city of Lishui in the south of Zhejiang Province, China. It is the only autonomous county located in Eastern China.

The county covers an area of 1,950 km^{2} (750 sq mi) and in 1999 had a population of 175,484. The postal code for the county is 323500. The government for the autonomous county is located at #19 Qianxi Road.

== Administration ==
The county administers 2 subdistricts, 4 towns, and 15 townships.

=== Subdistricts (街道; jiēdào) ===
- Hongxing (Chinese: 红星街道; pinyin: Hóngxīng Jiēdào)
- Hexi (鹤溪街道; Hèxī Jiēdào)

=== Towns (镇; zhèn) ===
- Bohai (渤海镇; Bóhǎi Zhèn)
- Dongkeng (东坑镇; Dōngkēng Zhèn)
- Yingchuan (英川镇; Yīngchuān Zhèn)
- Shawan (沙湾镇; Shāwān Zhèn)

=== Townships (乡; xiāng) ===
- Bohai (大均乡; Dàjūn Xiāng)
- Chengzhao (澄照乡; Chéngzhào Xiāng)
- Meiqi (梅岐乡; Méiqí Xiāng)
- Zhengkeng (郑坑乡; Zhèngkēng Xiāng)
- Daji (大漈乡; Dàjì Xiāng)
- Jingnan (景南乡; Jǐngnán Xiāng)
- Yanxi (雁溪乡; Yànxī Xiāng)
- Luci (鸬鹚乡; Lúcí Xiāng)
- Wutong (梧桐乡; Wútóng Xiāng)
- Biaoxi (标溪乡; Biāoxī Xiāng)
- Maoyang (毛垟乡; Máoyáng Xiāng)
- Qiulu (秋炉乡; Qiūlú Xiāng)
- Dadi (大地乡; Dàdì Xiāng)
- Jiadi (家地乡; Jiādì Xiāng)
- Jiulong (九龙乡; Jiǔlóng Xiāng)
