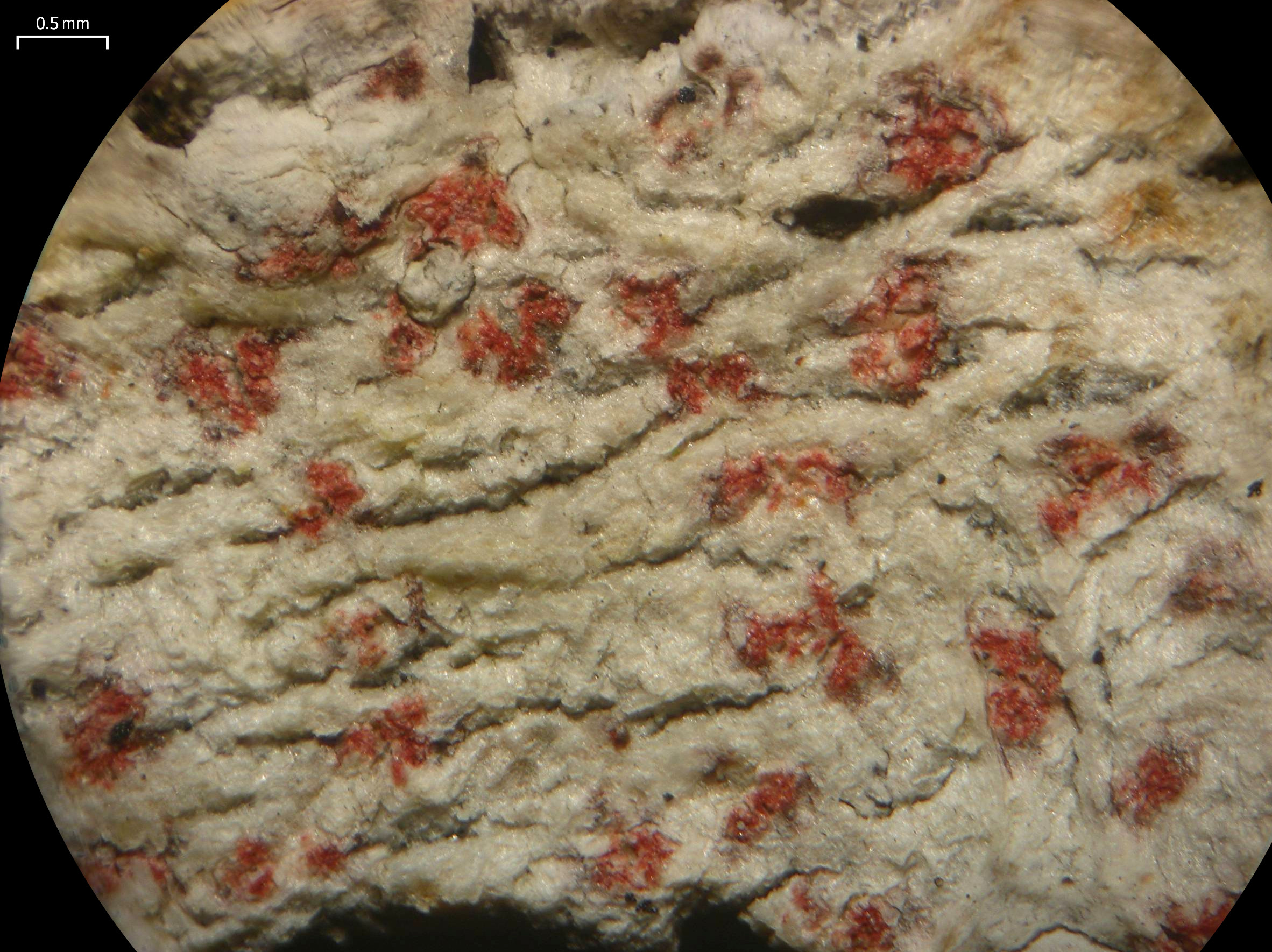
- Closeup of Coniarthonia pyrrhula growing on Myrica; scale: 0.5 mm

Scientific classification
- Kingdom: Fungi
- Division: Ascomycota
- Class: Arthoniomycetes
- Order: Arthoniales
- Family: Arthoniaceae
- Genus: Coniarthonia
- Species: C. pyrrhula

Binomial name
- Coniarthonia pyrrhula (Nyl.) Grube (2001)

Synonyms
- Arthonia pyrrhula Nyl. (1885)

= Coniarthonia pyrrhula =

Species of lichen-forming fungus

Coniarthonia pyrrhula is a species of crustose lichen-forming fungus in the family Arthoniaceae. It is a bark-dwelling lichen with a thin, whitish crust and flat, crimson-red fruiting bodies with a floury surface, found across the Americas and in Macaronesia. It is the type species of the genus Coniarthonia, described originally in 1885 and transferred to that genus in 2001.

== Taxonomy ==
Coniarthonia pyrrhula was originally described by William Nylander in 1885 as Arthonia pyrrhula (cited as "Nyl. ex Nyl."), based on material collected in the Southeastern United States ("in Carolina") by Edward Tuckerman. In the protologue, Nylander characterized the species by its broad, whitish thallus, scarlet linear fruiting bodies (apothecia) that are usually simple or only slightly branched, and relatively large, colorless, ascospores with 5 or 6 septa. He also distinguished it from Arthonia cinnabarina by its more slender apothecia and different spores. When Martin Grube established the genus Coniarthonia in 2001 for a set of red-pruinose arthonioid lichens with poorly delimited, largely hydrophobic ascomata packed with red crystals, he transferred the species as Coniarthonia pyrrhula and selected a lectotype from Nylander's material (H-NYL 5599). Grube also designated C. pyrrhula as the type species of Coniarthonia.

Within the genus, C. pyrrhula belongs to the C. pyrrhula group, whose members have relatively large, multi-septate to (in some species) muriform ascospores and a distinctive set of reddish pigments detectable by thin-layer chromatography. The species is reported to be fairly common in collections but is often encountered without mature asci or spores, which can make confident identification difficult.

== Description ==
The body (thallus) is a thin, spreading crust that is whitish to greenish gray and may be inconspicuous or partly disrupt the bark surface; it is usually bordered by reddish-brown boundary lines (prothallus). The algal partner (photobiont) is from the green algal genus Trentepohlia, with oval (ellipsoid) cells arranged in short chains.

The fruiting bodies (ascomata) develop in the outermost bark layers and may be partly covered by a thin bark film when young. They are irregularly rounded to elongated and often forked, with poorly defined margins, and they sit level with the thallus as flat, crimson-red patches with a powdery (farinose) surface. In cross-section they are about 70–120 μm thick. Under the microscope, the uppermost tissue layer (epithecium) is packed with crimson crystals and is only weakly gelatinized (described as water-repellent), with a largely colorless (hyaline) spore-bearing layer (hymenium) beneath. The tissue below the hymenium (hypothecium) also contains red crystals, but less densely. The asci are widely dispersed, nearly spherical (subglobose), and each contains eight ascospores. The ascospores are colorless, oval to pear-shaped (ellipsoid to obovate), typically with 6–7 transverse septa (rarely with an additional longitudinal one), measuring about 34–40 × 13–17 μm.

In chemical tests, the crimson pigments dissolve in K (potassium hydroxide solution), giving a purplish-orange reaction. Grube characterised several purplish pigment fractions (Pyr1–Pyr3) by thin-layer chromatography from the fruiting bodies.

== Habitat and distribution ==
Coniarthonia pyrrhula is an epiphytic, bark-dwelling lichen reported from bark of angiosperms. Its range spans North, Central, and South America, with additional records from Macaronesia. Because it is often collected in a sterile or poorly fertile state, it can be confused with C. gregarina when mature asci and spores are absent.
