= Henry Willey =

American lichenologist and newspaper editor

Henry Willey (July 10, 1824 – March 15, 1907) was an American lichenologist and newspaper editor. He made significant contributions to the study of North American lichens and was a prominent figure in local journalism during the late 19th century.

== Biography ==
Henry Willey was born in Geneseo, New York in 1824. After working as a school teacher in Mattapoisett, he became the editor of the New Bedford, Massachusetts newspaper The Standard in 1856, a position he held until 1900.

Willey began studying lichens around 1862, encouraged by leading American lichenologist Edward Tuckerman. He continued his lichen research until a few years before his death, spanning a period of over four decades. His work culminated in the publication of An Enumeration of the Lichens Found in New Bedford, Massachusetts, and its Vicinity from 1862 to 1892, which is considered one of the most comprehensive local studies of American lichens ever conducted. This work documented 500 species and subspecies, including 17 newly described species.

Throughout his career, Willey published 26 papers on lichens between 1867 and 1898. He described a total of 26 new species, a relatively modest number for his time due to Tuckerman's prolific work in naming new species. Willey also edited an exsiccata titled Lichenes exsiccati.

After Tuckerman's death in 1886, Willey became the leading student of North American lichens. He edited the second volume of Tuckerman's Synopsis, a task for which he was uniquely qualified due to his thorough understanding of Tuckerman's methods and work.

Willey's lichen collection, now housed at the Smithsonian Institution, was one of the largest and most valuable private American collections of its time, containing approximately 10,000 specimens.

Willey died in Weymouth, Massachusetts, on March 15, 1907.

== Contributions to lichenology ==
Willey made several important contributions to the field of lichenology. His List of North American Lichens (1873) and An Introduction to the Study of Lichens with a Supplement (1887) were valuable resources for lichen students of his era.

Despite advances in lichen biology during his lifetime, Willey never accepted the "dual hypothesis" of lichen nature, which proposed that lichens were composite organisms. He maintained the belief that the green or blue-green cells were integral parts of the lichen, similar to chloroplasts in higher plants.

Willey collaborated with and assisted numerous other botanists in their lichen studies. His work appears in publications by other researchers, including Joseph Charles Arthur, Liberty Hyde Bailey, and Edward Willet Dorland Holway, among others.

== Selected publications ==
- Willey, Henry (1871). "Lichens under the microscope". American Naturalist. 4 (11): 665–675. doi:10.1086/270670. JSTOR 2446910.
- Willey, Henry (1887). An Introduction to the Study of Lichens with a Supplement. New Bedford: E. Anthony & Sons. pp. 1–58.
- Willey, Henry (1890). A Synopsis of the Genus Arthonia. New Bedford: E. Anthony & Sons. pp. 1–62.
