= Chiodectonic acid =

Chemical compound found in some lichens

Names
- IUPAC name 2-Acetyl-3,5,6,8-tetrahydroxy-7-methoxybenzo[f][1]benzofuran-4,9-dione

Identifiers
3D model (JSmol)	Interactive image
ChEBI	CHEBI:144214
PubChem CID	138756199
- InChI: InChI=1S/C15H10O9/c1-3(16)13-11(21)6-7(17)4-5(9(19)14(6)24-13)10(20)15(23-2)12(22)8(4)18/h17,19,21-22H,1-2H3 Key: ILUWXELFYCLFHQ-UHFFFAOYSA-N
- SMILES: COC1=C(O)C(=O)c2c(c(O)c3oc(C(C)=O)c(O)c3c2O)C1=O

Properties
Chemical formula	C_{15}H_{10}O_{8}
Molar mass	318.237 g·mol^{−1}
Appearance	Dark red rhombic plates
Melting point	294–296 °C (561–565 °F; 567–569 K)
- Except where otherwise noted, data are given for materials in their standard state (at 25 °C [77 °F], 100 kPa). Infobox references

Chiodectonic acid is an organic compound in the structural class of chemicals known as anthraquinones. It occurs as a secondary metabolite in some lichens.

== History ==
The red pigment "pyxiferin" was first isolated from the lichen Pyxine coccifera by K. Chandrasenan and colleagues in 1965, who proposed a biphenylquinone structure for it. Later, during research on chiodectonic acid, Wolfgang Steglich noticed that this pigment shared the same Rf value in thin-layer chromatography (TLC) as chiodectonic acid from Chiodecton sanguineum. Though initial investigation was limited by the small amount of lichen material available, subsequent analysis of a larger quantity of P. coccifera confirmed that "pyxiferin" was actually identical to chiodectonic acid. Since chiodectonic acid had been previously described by Oswald Hesse in 1904, this name takes precedence. Further analysis showed that the compound from both lichens had the molecular formula C_{15}H_{10}O_{8}, contradicting the C_{13}H_{8}O_{8} formula that Chandrasenan et al. had reported for pyxiferin.

== Properties ==
Chiodectonic acid is a member of the class of chemical compounds called anthraquinones. Specifically, it is a naphthoquinone derivative. Its IUPAC name is 2-acetyl-3,5,6,8-tetrahydroxy-7-methoxybenzo[f][1]benzofuran-4,9-dione. The ultraviolet absorbance maxima (λ_{max}) has three peaks at 287, 510, and 538 nm. In the infrared spectrum, peaks occur at 736, 800, 816, 828, 854, 944, 970, 1008, 1042, 1076, 1120, 1176, 1290, 1410, 1456, 1534, 1590, 1624, 1658, 3000, and 3340 cm^{−1}. Chiodectonic acid's molecular formula is C_{15}H_{10}O_{8}; it has a molecular mass of 334.23 grams per mole. In its purified form, it exists as dark red rhombic plates with a melting point of 294–296 °C (561–565 °F).
