= Confluentic acid =

Chemical compound found in some lichens

Names
- IUPAC name 4-[2-Hydroxy-4-methoxy-6-(2-oxoheptyl)benzoyl]oxy-2-methoxy-6-pentylbenzoic acid
- Other names Confluentinic acid

Identifiers
CAS Number	6009-12-7
3D model (JSmol)	Interactive image
ChEBI	CHEBI:144140
ChemSpider	89998
PubChem CID	99614
CompTox Dashboard (EPA)	DTXSID70208834
- InChI: InChI=1S/C28H36O8/c1-5-7-9-11-18-14-22(17-24(35-4)26(18)27(31)32)36-28(33)25-19(13-20(29)12-10-8-6-2)15-21(34-3)16-23(25)30/h14-17,30H,5-13H2,1-4H3,(H,31,32) Key: UANVCGQMNRTKGM-UHFFFAOYSA-N
- SMILES: CCCCCC1=C(C(=CC(=C1)OC(=O)C2=C(C=C(C=C2O)OC)CC(=O)CCCCC)OC)C(=O)O

Properties
Chemical formula	C_{28}H_{36}O_{8}
Molar mass	500.588 g·mol^{−1}
Melting point	157 °C (315 °F; 430 K)
- Except where otherwise noted, data are given for materials in their standard state (at 25 °C [77 °F], 100 kPa). Infobox references

Confluentic acid is an organic compound belonging to the chemical class known as depsides. It serves as a secondary metabolite in certain lichens and plays a role in distinguishing closely related species within the genus Porpidia. In 1899, Friedrich Wilhelm Zopf isolated a compound from Lecidea confluens, which he initially named confluentin and noted for its melting point of 147–148 °C. This substance demonstrated the ability to turn litmus paper red and, when interacting with alkali, decomposed into carbon dioxide and phenol-like compounds. Zopf subsequently revised the chemical formula and melting point of the compound. Siegfried Huneck renamed it confluentinic acid in 1962, characterising it as optically inactive, with distinct colour reactions and solubility properties, and determined its molecular formula as C_{28}H_{36}O_{8}.

Confluentic acid can be identified using thin-layer chromatography and high-performance liquid chromatography. An alternative visual detection method involves examining the lichen's thallus or apothecium (fruiting body) under a microscope on a slide treated with potassium hydroxide, which reveals oil droplets indicative of confluentic acid. Several structural analogues of confluentic acid have been isolated from a variety of lichen species.

== History ==
In 1899, Friedrich Wilhelm Zopf reported isolating a substance from Lecidea confluens, which he named confluentin, characterised by a melting point of 147–148 °C (297–298 °F). He also found that this substance turns litmus paper red, reacts with FeCl_{3} to produce a red-brown colour, and decomposes into carbon dioxide, a volatile substance, and a phenol-like compound with a melting point of 52 °C upon interaction with alkali. Zopf initially proposed the formula C_{37}H_{50}O_{10} for this compound before revising it to C_{26}H_{36}O_{7}, noting the updated melting point as 154 °C (309 °F).

In his 1962 report of his chemical investigations into the substance, German chemist Siegfried Huneck proposed naming it 'confluentinic acid' due to the presence of the carboxylic acid functional group, aligning with the naming conventions of other lichen products. (Note: The name "confluentin" was later used in 2003 for a natural prenylphenol isolated from specimens of the mushroom-forming fungus Albatrellus confluens.) Huneck described the substance as optically inactive and noted its poor solubility in petroleum ether, ethyl acetate, and acetone, but found it readily soluble in ether, benzene, and methanol. He noted the following colour reactions: weak brownish with alcoholic FeCl_{3} solution, blue, green, and finally violet with potassium hydroxide and chloroform upon heating, orange to orange-red with tetrazotised benzidine, and gray-violet with p-phenylenediamine; no colouration was observed with barium hydroxide. Huneck used elemental analysis and molecular weight determination by titration to determine the molecular formula of confluentinic acid as C_{28}H_{36}O_{8}. The Zeisel determination for methoxyl group analysis indicated two methoxyl groups per molecule.

John Elix and Brian Ferguson proposed a method for the total synthesis of confluentic acid in 1978. The synthesis began with the direct condensation of suitably substituted aromatic carboxylic acids and phenols, using dicyclohexylcarbodiimide. Key precursors involved were specially prepared benzoic acids, with protective measures for reactive groups. The process included steps like bromination, alkylation, and the strategic use of protecting groups for the phenol and carboxyl functionalities. The synthesis culminated in the removal of protecting groups and hydrogenolysis over palladised carbon to yield the desired depsides including confluentic acid. In 1993, G. Fegie and colleagues introduced a standardised high-performance liquid chromatographic method that enabled the separation and detection of hundreds of lichen products, confluentic acid included.

== Properties ==
Confluentic acid is a member of the class of chemical compounds called depsides. Its IUPAC name is 4-[2-hydroxy-4-methoxy-6-(2-oxoheptyl)benzoyl]oxy-2-methoxy-6-pentylbenzoic acid. The ultraviolet absorbance maxima (λ_{max}) has two peaks at 268 and 304 nm. In the infrared spectrum, significant peaks indicative of the carboxylic acid functional group occur at 1700 cm^{−1} (C=O stretching in carbonyl groups) and within the broad range of 2600 to 3100 cm^{−1} (O-H stretching). The broad band at 3100 is due to hydrogen bonding, while the peak at 3500 is the COOH stretching band. Confluentic acid's molecular formula is C_{28}H_{36}O_{8}; it has a molecular mass of 500.57 grams per mole. In its purified form, it exists as crystalline needles with a melting point of 157 °C (315 °F).

== Occurrence ==
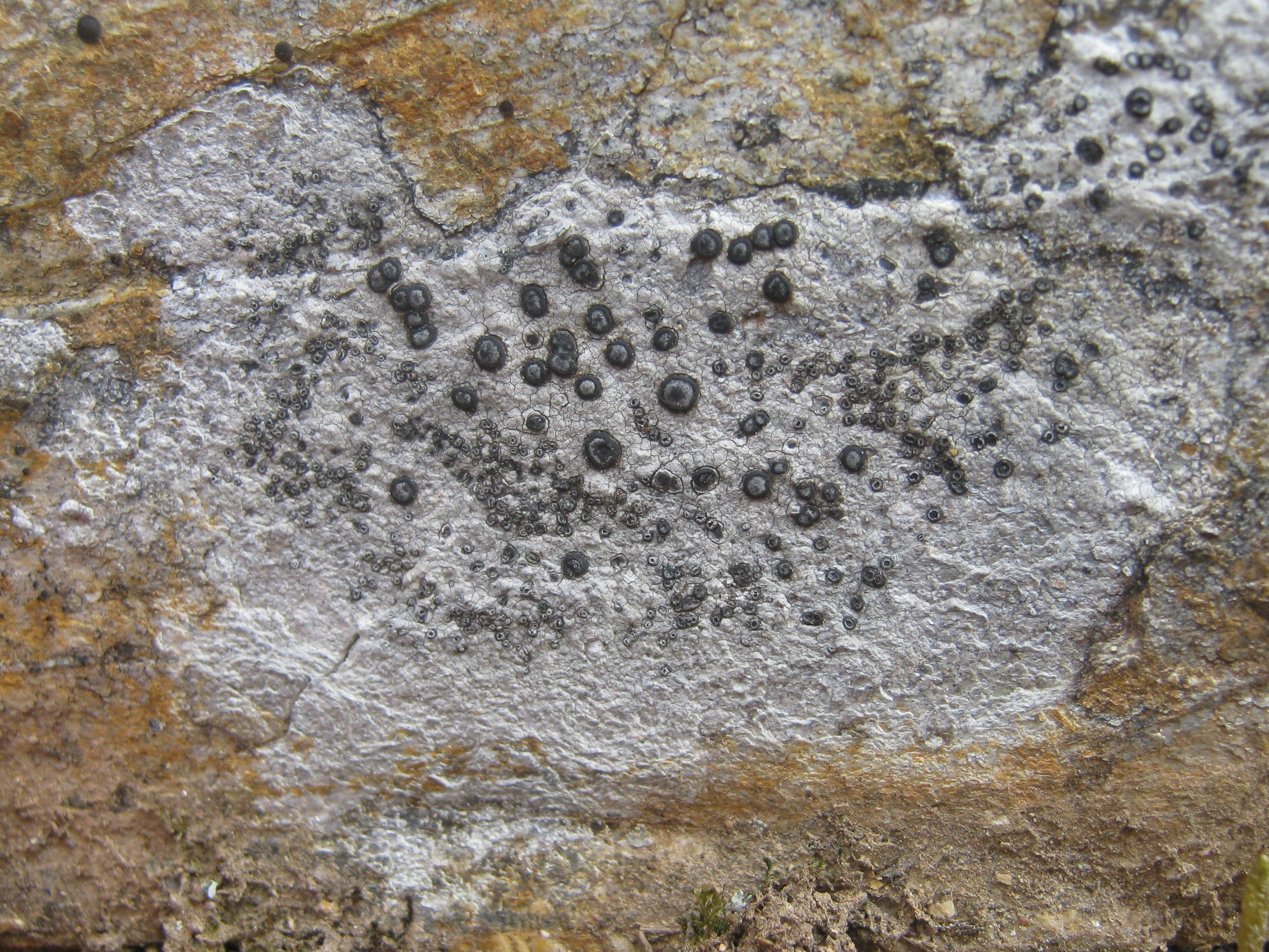
Porpidia cinereoatra can be distinguished from lookalikes by the presence of confluentic acid

The mycobiont (fungal partner) of the lichen Lecidea tessellata has been shown to produce confluentic acid when cultured without its algal photobiont partner. Confluentic acid has also been reported from mycobiont cultures of Parmelina carporrhizans. Confluentic acid is produced by almost all species of the genus Immersaria, which is usually accompanied by 2'-O-methylmicrophyllinic acid. The absence of confluentic acid distinguishes Inoderma nipponicum, from others in genus Inoderma, which typically contain this chemical. The only character reliably distinguishing Porpidia contraponenda and the morphologically similar Porpidia cinereoatra is their secondary chemistry: the former contains 2'-O-methylmicrophyllinate and the latter has confluentic acid. A chemosyndrome is a set of biosynthetically related compounds produced by a lichen. The confluentic acid chemosyndrome was identified in several lichens in the family Lecideaceae; it contains confluentic acid as the major metabolite, and minor amounts of 2'-O-methylperlatolic acid, olivetonide monomethyl ether, and 2'-O-methylmicrophyllinic acid.

Not just limited to lichen-forming fungi, confluentic acid has also been reported from the Brazilian plant Himatanthus sucuuba, highlighting the compound's broader biological distribution.

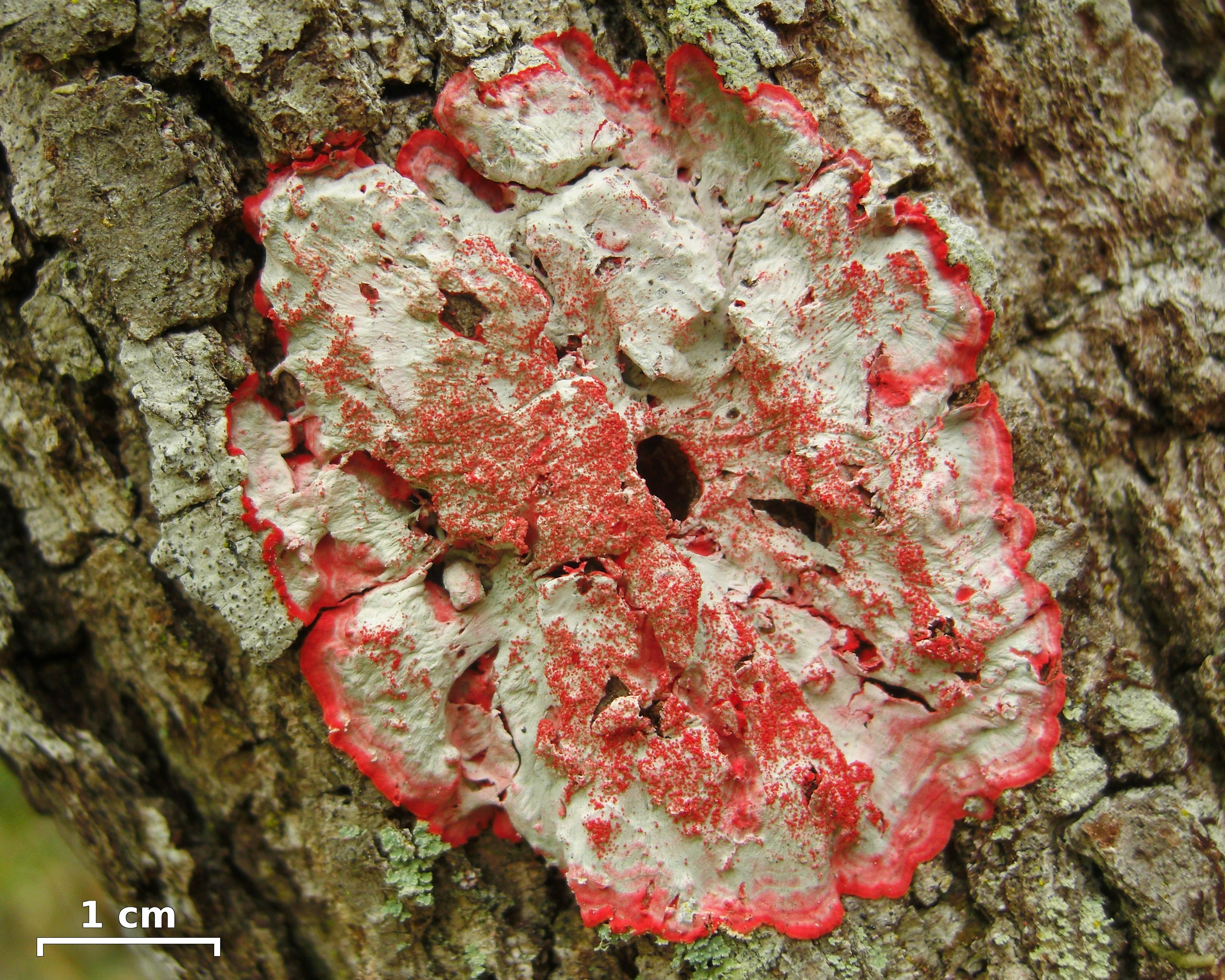
Confluentic acid is a major lichen product in the crustose lichen Cryptothecia rubrocincta.

A study on Cryptothecia rubrocincta reveals distinct biochemical compositions in various parts of its thallus, suggesting specialised roles for the compounds present. Specifically, confluentic acid was found exclusively in localised brown flecks within the red and pink zones of the thallus, alongside calcium oxalate monohydrate. This distribution is in contrast to other thallus areas, such as the white zone containing only calcium oxalate dihydrate and the dark red zone with chiodectonic acid, chlorophyll, beta-carotene, and additional calcium oxalate dihydrate in the pink sub-zone. The presence of confluentic acid in specific areas without beta-carotene and chiodectonic acid—both known UV protectants—suggests that confluentic acid plays a different role in the lichen's survival strategy. While the exact function of confluentic acid in these localised brown flecks remains unclear, it is indicated that it is not required for radiation protection. The study also highlights a transition within the lichen from calcium oxalate dihydrate to the more stable monohydrate form, associated with the ageing process and possibly the metabolic activities involving confluentic acid.

== Detection ==
Alan Fryday (1991) outlined a technique for the detection of confluentic acid in lichen samples. This method involves placing a section of the lichen's thallus or apothecium (fruiting body) on a microscope slide, which is then saturated with a 10% potassium hydroxide (KOH) solution. When examined under a compound microscope at 40x magnification, a distinctive 'halo' of small oil droplets or bubbles emanating from the tissue section indicates the presence of confluentic acid. The oil droplets generated during this detection process consist of 4-O-methylolivetonide, a compound that is insoluble in potassium hydroxide solution. This substance forms as a result of confluentic acid undergoing hydrolysis in the presence of potassium hydroxide. This test is useful in distinguishing between morphologically similar yet chemically distinct species within the genus Porpidia.

== Related compounds ==
The chemical diversity within lichens includes a variety of compounds related to confluentic acid, reflecting the complex biosynthetic capabilities of these symbiotic organisms and their significance in lichen taxonomy and ecology. In 1987, Chicita Culberson and colleagues reported the use of high-performance liquid chromatography to isolate and identify additional higher-carbon analogue substances in the "confluentic series", including hyperconfluentic acid, superconfluentic acid, and subconfluentic acid. These substances were isolated from the lichen Pseudobaeomyces pachycarpa. The structure of subconfluentic acid (4-[2'-hydroxy-4'-methoxy-6'-(2"-oxopentyl)benzoyloxy]-2-methoxy-6-pentylbenzoic acid) was later established by synthesis. The compound 4-O-demethylsuperconfluentic acid, structurally similar to confluentic acid, was isolated from Stirtonia ramosa. Another analogue, 2-O-methylconfluentic acid, was identified from Lecidea fuscoatra.

Gowan (1989) suggested a close chemical and biosynthetic relationship between methyl 2'-O-methylmicrophyllinate and confluentic acid, noting that the biosynthetic pathways leading to these compounds primarily differ in the length of the acetyl-polymalonyl segment. This means that the two compounds are synthesised through similar processes, differing mainly in the size of a specific chain within the molecule. Additionally, there is only a minor variation in their methylation patterns. Gowan further suggested that methyl 2'-O-methylmicrophyllinate likely originated from an ancestor that already produced confluentic acid.
