= Eremothecella ajaysinghii =

Scientific classification
- Kingdom: Fungi
- Division: Ascomycota
- Class: Arthoniomycetes
- Order: Arthoniales
- Family: Arthoniaceae
- Genus: Eremothecella
- Species: E. ajaysinghii

Binomial name
- Eremothecella ajaysinghii Jagad.Ram & G.P.Sinha (2019)

Species of lichen-forming fungus

Eremothecella ajaysinghii is a species of foliicolous (leaf-dwelling) lichen in the family Arthoniaceae. It was described from specimens collected in the Andaman and Nicobar Islands, India. It forms a thin, greenish to whitish-grey crust on living leaves and produces dark, often pale-dusting (pruinose) fruiting bodies. The species was one of several members of Eremothecella documented during a modern survey of the archipelago's evergreen and mangrove forests.

== Taxonomy ==
Eremothecella ajaysinghii was formally described in 2019 by T.A.M. Jagadeesh Ram and G.P. Sinha, with the holotype collected in Kalara Forest, North Andaman Island, at 62 m elevation on 23 April 2011. The epithet honours the late Ajay Singh for his contributions to Indian lichenology.

== Description ==
The thallus (the lichen body) of Eremothecella ajaysinghii is thin, matt and ecorticate (lacking a protective cortex), forming dispersed to continuous rounded or irregular patches 10–40 mm across, greenish grey to whitish grey, typically 12–25 micrometres (μm) thick. The photobiont cells occur in radiating plates and are rectangular (about 8–15 × 4–6 μm). Ascomata (fruiting bodies) are few to many, rounded to irregular, nearly flat to slightly raised, dark brown to black and usually moderately to densely pruinose (a frost-like, grey dust that dissolves in potassium hydroxide), 0.4–1.1 mm across and 45–80 μm thick. In section: epithecium pale to dark brown and granular; hymenium pale brown (I+ orange-red, KI+ blue→yellow); hypothecium pale brown. Paraphysoids are branched and anastomosing. Asci are globose (or nearly so), and contain eight spores. The ascospores are colourless at first, later becoming brownish and slightly wrinkled, clavate and gently curved, with the end cell enlarged and only slight constrictions at the septa; they have 8–10 cross-walls, occasionally up to 11, and typically measure 36–50 × 8–10 μm, though they can range from 33 to 52 × 7–12 μm.

Asexual structures are frequent: pycnidia are flattened, black, oval to irregular (about 0.2–0.5 × 0.2–0.3 mm). Conidia are long, thread-like (filiform), multiseptate and slightly wider at one end, measuring 70–125 × 1.5–2.0 μm. Standard spot tests on the thallus are negative (K−, C−, KC−, P−), and thin-layer chromatography detected no secondary metabolites.

=== Similar species ===
The genus Eremothecella is set apart from the similar, species-rich genus Arthonia by its combination of dark brown to black fruiting bodies (ascomata) with loose paraphysoids, spherical (asci) that can protrude as tiny warts, and flattened (applanate) pycnidia producing long, conidia with many septa—features that led modern authors to maintain Eremothecella as a distinct genus. Within that framework, E. ajaysinghii most closely resembles E. macrocephala in having pruinose ascomata, but it differs in having distinctly smaller ascospores with 8–10 septa (rarely 11) that typically measure 36–50 × 8–10 μm (with occasional extremes of 33–52 × 7–12 μm). It also contrasts with other pruinose species: E. cyaneoides (only 3–5-septate spores) and E. variratae (orange-yellow pruina).

== Habitat and distribution ==
Eremothecella ajaysinghii is foliicolous and occurs in the shaded understorey of evergreen and mangrove forests across the Andaman and Nicobar Islands. It has been recorded on leaves of several palms (including Calamus spp. and Korthalsia laciniosa) as well as on dicotyledonous hosts such as Donax canniformis, Garcinia nervosa and Heritiera littoralis. Collections span North, Middle, South and Little Andaman, Car Nicobar, Katchal, Little Nicobar and Great Nicobar, mostly at low elevations (about 5–30 m). Field notes emphasise its preference for dense to open shade in humid tropical forest.
