= Tylophoron galapagoense =

Scientific classification
- Kingdom: Fungi
- Division: Ascomycota
- Class: Arthoniomycetes
- Order: Arthoniales
- Family: Arthoniaceae
- Genus: Tylophoron
- Species: T. galapagoense

Binomial name
- Tylophoron galapagoense Bungartz, Ertz, Diederich & Tibell (2011)

Species of lichen-forming fungus

Tylophoron galapagoense is a species of saxicolous (rock-dwelling) crustose lichen in the family Arthoniaceae. It is found in the Galápagos Islands, where it forms patches on volcanic rock in sheltered locations such as shaded overhangs and crevices. It occurs from coastal areas through dry lowland forests to the transition zone. The species is distinguished from the similar bark-dwelling Tylophoron hibernicum by its thicker, cream-to-beige thallus and its preference for drier, rock-sheltered habitats.

== Taxonomy ==
Tylophoron galapagoense was described as a new species in 2011 by Frank Bungartz, Damien Ertz, Paul Diederich, and Leif Tibell. In the study, the authors used morphological, chemical, ecological, and DNA evidence to place the previously recognized "sporodochia-only" genus Blarneya within Tylophoron, and they treated T. galapagoense as one of the rock-dwelling members of that group.

The species was separated from the similar Tylophoron hibernicum using a combination of habitat and diagnostic features. Compared with T. hibernicum, T. galapagoense has a thicker, more compact thallus that is typically cream to beige (rather than a brighter white), and its thallus gives a stronger C spot-test reaction (turning a clearer red). It is saxicolous (grows on rock) and tends to occur in sheltered recesses such as shaded overhangs. The type specimen was collected on Isabela Island (Volcán Darwin) from rock beneath an overhang in the archipelago's transition zone.

== Description ==
The lichen forms a thin, smooth crust on rock. The thallus is usually creamy white to pale brown, lacks a distinct outer cortex, and is up to about 0.5 mm thick. The surface bears many small, rounded sporodochia (asexual spore-producing cushions), typically 0.5–1 mm across and often a little paler than the surrounding thallus. The photosynthetic partner (photobiont) is the filamentous green alga Trentepohlia. A pale, somewhat cottony thallus margin (prothallus) may be visible, about 0.5–1 mm wide.

The sporodochia produce hyaline conidia (asexual spores) that are usually single-celled and only occasionally one-septate. They are generally rounded to ellipsoid, with single-celled conidia commonly about 5–6.5 × 3.5–4.5 μm, and one-septate conidia commonly about 8–11 × 3–4.5 μm (with wider extremes reported in the original measurements). Sexual fruiting bodies appear to be rare. In one specimen they were abundant, but the spore mass consisted of degraded material and intact ascospores were not observed, and pycnidia have not been reported for the species. Standard lichen spot tests are consistent: the thallus is C+ (red), K−, KC+ (red), P−, and UV−; the sporodochia are C+ (red), K+ (yellow), and KC+ (red). Thin-layer chromatography detected lecanoric acid in all examined specimens, with an additional pale orange compound reported from the type specimen after heating.

== Habitat and distribution ==
Tylophoron galapagoense is known only from the Galápagos Islands, where it has been recorded from five islands. It grows on volcanic rock in sheltered microsites such as shaded overhangs and crevices, from near-coastal habitats through dry lowland forests and into the transition zone. On Santiago Island it has also been found at higher elevations, where it occurs tucked into crevices on a dry, north- to northeast-facing crater rim.

At the type locality on Volcán Darwin (Isabela Island), the collections were made on the volcano's western slopes, described as lying in the rain shadow of Fernandina Island. These dry lava flows support relatively low transition-zone vegetation even at unusually high elevations, whereas humid forests occur on other parts of the island. Within the archipelago, the bark-dwelling T. hibernicum is reported as more typical of humid highland forests, while T. galapagoense is associated with drier, rock-sheltered sites. T. galapagoense is one of four Tylophoron taxa that have been recorded from the Galápagos, and the only one considered endemic to the region.
