= Sporodophoron primorskiense =

Scientific classification
- Domain: Eukaryota
- Kingdom: Fungi
- Division: Ascomycota
- Class: Arthoniomycetes
- Order: Arthoniales
- Family: Arthoniaceae
- Genus: Sporodophoron
- Species: S. primorskiense

Binomial name
- Sporodophoron primorskiense Frisch & Y.Ohmura (2015)

Species of lichen

Sporodophoron primorskiense is a little-known species of corticolous (bark-dwelling) lichen in the family Arthoniaceae. It is notable for its distinctive white, thin growth patterns and small sporodochia, or spore-producing structures. The species is named after the Primorsky Krai region in the Russian Far East, where it was first discovered. It has since been recorded in Japan.

== Taxonomy ==
Sporodophoron primorskiense was described as a new species by Andreas Frisch and Yoshihito Ohmura in 2015. The etymology of the species name primorskiense derives from Primorsky Krai, the region in the Russian Far East where the type specimen was discovered. The holotype of this species was collected on the bark of a deciduous broadleaf tree, at an elevation of 220 m (720 ft), in September 2013.

== Description ==
Sporodophoron primorskiense is characterised by a thin, whitish, continuous thallus, which appears pale olivaceous grey to white. Its texture ranges from matte to slightly glossy, with an average height of around 0.17 mm. This species is distinguished by its numerous small, discrete sporodochia, which measure between 0.25 and 0.50 mm in diameter. The sporodochia are convex in shape and well-differentiated, sometimes exhibiting a less distinct thallus margin.

Sporodophoron primorskiense forms sporodochial conidia, or asexual spores, that have between 0 and 2 septa, with an irregular shape that can be round, elliptical, or short cylindrical. These conidia measure between 5–11 by 3.0–4.5 μm in diameter. They are hyaline, or transparent, and are often bent, wavy in outline, or slightly branched.

Unlike some other species, S. primorskiense does not produce apothecia, or sexual fruiting bodies. This species also lacks the compound 2'-O-methylperlatolic acid, which is present in the closely related S. gossypinum. This absence, along with differences in the size and number of sporodochia and conidia, help distinguish S. primorskiense from S. gossypinum.

In chemical spot tests, the thallus and sporodochia of S. primorskiense react to a potassium hydroxide (K) test with a lemon yellow colour. Other reagents do not yield positive reactions, including C−, KC−, and PD−. The species is also iodine (I) and potassium iodide (KI) positive, indicating the presence of certain compounds. A chemical analysis of the lichen published in 2023, using high-performance liquid chromatography coupled to mass spectrometry revealed the presence of several lichen products previously unknown to the species: confluentic acid, 4-0-methylolivetolcarboxylic acid, hyperlatolic acid, and perlatolic acid.

== Similar species ==
Sporodophoron primorskiense is morphologically similar to S. gossypinum, but can be differentiated by several physical and chemical characteristics. Unlike S. gossypinum, S. primorskiense is corticolous, preferring to grow on the bark of trees. Additionally, the sporodochia of S. primorskiense are smaller and more numerous, ranging from 0.25 to 0.50 mm, compared to the 0.5–0.9 mm-sized sporodochia of S. gossypinum. The conidia of S. primorskiense are also slightly smaller, measuring 5–11 by 3.0–4.5 μm, in contrast to the 6–14 by 3.5–7.0 μm conidia of S. gossypinum.

Notably, S. primorskiense does not contain 2'-O-methylperlatolic acid, a compound that is present in S. gossypinum. DNA sequence data also confirms the genetic distinctness of S. primorskiense from S. gossypinum. This species is also distinct from Sporodophoron americanum, another member of the same genus, which differs in its chemical composition and has wider sporodochial conidia.

== Habitat and distribution ==
Sporodophoron primorskiense was originally known to occur in a single locality in Primorsky Krai in the Russian Far East. There, it grows on the bark of broadleaf deciduous trees in mixed forest regions, particularly along streams. The following year, the lichen was reported from Toyama Prefecture in Japan, where it was found in an old-growth forest growing on the bark of Fagus crenata at an elevation of about 1,000 m (3,300 ft). Situated at the Japanese side of the Sea of Japan, this location is opposite from Primorsky Krai. In 2023, S. primorskiense was recorded in two more locations in deciduous and mixed forests in the south of Primorye Territory.
