= Eremothecella helicella =

Scientific classification
- Kingdom: Fungi
- Division: Ascomycota
- Class: Arthoniomycetes
- Order: Arthoniales
- Family: Arthoniaceae
- Genus: Eremothecella
- Species: E. helicella

Binomial name
- Eremothecella helicella Aptroot & M.Cáceres (2014)

Species of lichen-forming fungus

Eremothecella helicella is a species of lichen in the family Arthoniaceae. Found in Brazil, it was described as a new species in 2014. It is the first bark-dwelling member of its genus, as all other known species of Eremothecella grow exclusively on leaves. The lichen forms a glossy green crust on tree bark and is distinguished by its unusual corkscrew-shaped asexual spores, a feature rarely seen among lichen-forming fungi. Known only from primary rainforest sites around Porto Velho in Rondônia state, this species has been found growing on smooth-barked trees at low elevations.

== Taxonomy ==
Eremothecella helicella was described as new in 2014 from Rondônia, Brazil, by André Aptroot and Marcela Cáceres. The type was collected on smooth tree bark in primary rainforest in the Parque Natural Municipal de Porto Velho at about 100 m (330 ft) elevation. The authors noted that all previously known Eremothecella species were strictly leaf-dwelling (foliicolous); E. helicella is the first corticolous (bark-dwelling) member of the genus. It is presently known only from the asexual (pycnidial) state and is distinguished within Eremothecella by its strongly coiled (helicoid) thread-like conidia, a feature not reported in other species of the genus and otherwise unusual among lichenised ascomycetes (the only other similar example is Micarea subnigrata).

== Description ==
The thallus (the body of the lichen) forms a continuous, slightly glossy green crust without a contrasting border (no prothallus). Its algal partner is of the genus Trentepohlia (a filamentous green alga common in tropical lichens). No apothecia (sexual fruiting bodies) were seen. Instead, the species produces abundant superficial, flat, black pycnidia—tiny pimple-like structures, about 0.2–0.4 mm across—that release conidia (asexual spores). These conidia are colourless (hyaline), very slender and thread-like (filiform), and typically coiled like a corkscrew (helicoid), bearing about 17–29 cross-walls (septa); if uncoiled they measure about 70–95 × 2 μm, with septa spaced roughly 3–6 μm apart. The pycnidia are visible as black dots and the conidia appear coiled or uncoiled under the microscope. Spot tests on the thallus are negative (UV−, C−, P−, K−), and no secondary metabolites were detected by thin-layer chromatography.

== Habitat and distribution ==
Eremothecella helicella has been recorded on smooth bark of trees in primary lowland rainforest. As of 2025, it is known only from the state of Rondônia in Brazil, where it has been collected at several sites around Porto Velho during 2012 surveys.
