= Coniocarpon foliicola =

Scientific classification
- Kingdom: Fungi
- Division: Ascomycota
- Class: Arthoniomycetes
- Order: Arthoniales
- Family: Arthoniaceae
- Genus: Coniocarpon
- Species: C. foliicola

Binomial name
- Coniocarpon foliicola Aptroot (2022)
- Holotype: Reserva Cristalino, Mato Grosso, Brazil

Species of lichen-forming fungus

Coniocarpon foliicola is a foliicolous (leaf-dwelling) lichen in the family Arthoniaceae. Described in 2022 from specimens collected in old-growth rainforest in Mato Grosso, Brazil, this species is the first leaf-dwelling member of the genus Coniocarpon, which previously contained only bark-dwelling species. It forms thin, pale ochre-colored crusts on living leaves, with small pink fruiting bodies measuring 0.2–0.5 millimeters across.

== Taxonomy ==
Coniocarpon foliicola was described in 2022 by André Aptroot from material collected on living leaves in primary rainforest in the Reserva Cristalino, Mato Grosso, Brazil, at an elevation of 250 to 350 m (820 to 1,150 ft). The holotype (A. Aptroot 83123) is deposited in the herbarium of the Federal University of Mato Grosso do Sul (CGMS). Within Coniocarpon the species is distinguished by its foliicolous (leaf-dwelling) habit and its translucent, 3-septate (three-segmented), macrocephalic (enlarged-head), broadly clavate (club-shaped) ascospores, which measure 11.5–13 × 5–6 micrometers (μm). Aptroot noted that few species are currently known in Coniocarpon, none of them foliicolous, and that the new species also does not match any previously described foliicolous genus in the Arthoniaceae; these features support its placement as a distinct species of Coniocarpon. The specific epithet foliicola refers to its leaf-dwelling habit.

== Description ==
The thallus of Coniocarpon foliicola is crustose, continuous, lacking a cortex, dull and pale ochraceous. It covers areas of up to 1.5 cm (1 in) in diameter, is less than 0.1 mm thick, and is surrounded by an approximately 0.2 mm wide prothallus line. The photobiont is a trentepohlioid green alga. The ascomata are solitary and superficial on the thallus, round to irregularly oval, 0.2–0.5 mm in diameter and about 0.1 mm high, with a pink disc and a steep margin that is not differentiated internally. The epihymenium (uppermost layer) contains red crystals, and the hamathecium (supporting tissue) is not inspersed (filled with oil droplets), giving a pale blue IKI reaction; the paraphysoids (sterile filaments) are 1–1.5 μm wide and anastomosing (branching and fusing together). Ascospores are produced eight per ascus; they are hyaline (translucent), 3-septate (three-segmented), macrocephalic (with enlarged head) and broadly clavate (club-shaped), measuring 11.5–13 × 5–6 μm, and lack a surrounding gelatinous sheath. Pycnidia have not been observed. In standard spot tests the thallus is UV−, C−, K−, KC− and P−, while the red crystals of the apothecia react K+ (blood red) without dissolving. Thin-layer chromatography was not carried out because of the small amount of material, but the observed K-reaction suggests the presence of anthraquinone pigments.

== Habitat and distribution ==
Coniocarpon foliicola grows on living leaves in primary rainforest in the Reserva Cristalino region of Mato Grosso, Brazil, at elevations of about 250 to 350 m (820 to 1,150 ft). As of its original publication, it had not been reported from outside Brazil. No additional occurrences had been reported as of 2025.
