= Stirtonia schummii =

Scientific classification
- Domain: Eukaryota
- Kingdom: Fungi
- Division: Ascomycota
- Class: Arthoniomycetes
- Order: Arthoniales
- Family: Arthoniaceae
- Genus: Stirtonia
- Species: S. curvata

Binomial name
- Stirtonia curvata Aptroot (2009)

Species of lichen

Stirtonia schummii is a crustose lichen belonging to the family Arthoniaceae. It was described as new to science in 2009. The species is notable as the first of the genus Stirtonia to be described from Africa.

== Taxonomy ==
The species was described by the Dutch lichenologist André Aptroot based on specimens collected by Felix Schumm and J.P. Frahm in September 2008 from Anse Lazio, on the island of Praslin in the Seychelles. Aptroot named the species after Felix Schumm, recognizing his contribution to collecting the type specimen and preparing associated illustrations.

== Description ==
Stirtonia schummii is characterized by a crustose, smooth, contiguous thallus that spreads up to 5 cm in diameter. It is thin (less than 0.1 mm), pale to dirty whitish in color, and slightly glossy. The thallus contains calcium oxalate crystals, a common trait within the genus.

The ascigerous areas, which contain the reproductive structures, are distinct and typically rounded or slightly elongated, measuring about 0.3–0.8 mm in diameter. They are prominently raised above the surrounding thallus, white, and have a slightly powdery surface (pruinose). When abraded, these zones show subtle brownish dots.

Microscopically, the asci appear brown in surface view and are ovoid, each containing eight ascospores. The spores of S. schummii are ellipsoid, measuring between 36 and 45 μm long and 12–15 μm wide, and typically contain 7–9 transverse septa. The cell walls and septa are thick, each greater than 1 μm in width. The ascigerous areas show a positive blue reaction when stained with iodine (IKI+).

Chemically, this lichen contains perlatolic acid. It does not have any color reactions when tested with standard spot tests.

== Habitat and distribution ==
Stirtonia schummii has been documented in the Seychelles, specifically on the islands of Praslin and Mahé. The type specimen was collected from shrubs at coastal locations. The discovery in Seychelles represents the first record of the genus Stirtonia from Africa.
