= Tylophoron rufescens =

Scientific classification
- Domain: Eukaryota
- Kingdom: Fungi
- Division: Ascomycota
- Class: Arthoniomycetes
- Order: Arthoniales
- Family: Arthoniaceae
- Genus: Tylophoron
- Species: T. rufescens

Binomial name
- Tylophoron rufescens Aptroot (2022)

Species of lichen

Tylophoron rufescens is a species of lichen in the family Arthoniaceae, which was formally described in 2022 by André Aptroot. This corticolous (bark-dwelling) crustose lichen was identified in the primary rainforests and on sandstone under overhanging cliffs of Mato Grosso, Brazil.

== Taxonomy ==
Tylophoron rufescens was introduced to science in a study focusing on the lichen diversity of Brazil. The species name rufescens refers to the brown (rufescent) pruina (a type of powdery coating) found on its mazaedium (a mass of spore-producing tissue in certain lichens and fungi).

== Description ==
The thallus (the main body) of Tylophoron rufescens is crustose (crust-like), discontinuous, and primarily whitish, covering up to 5 cm in diameter but is less than 0.1 mm thick. It often appears almost hyphal (resembling fungal threads) and can leave areas of bare bark exposed. The lichen hosts a trentepohlioid photobiont (a type of green algae that lives in symbiosis with the fungal partner).

The ascomata (spore-producing structures) are solitary and superficial, with dimensions of 0.4–0.7 mm in width and up to 0.8 mm in height. The disc displays a purplish brown mazaedium, surrounded by a whitish-gray margin. Ascospores are brown, 1-septate (having one cross-wall), ellipsoid, and measure 11–14.5 by 5.5–6.5 μm. They are darker around the septum and do not possess a gelatinous sheath.

Chemical spot tests on the thallus yielded a UV– (non-fluorescent under UV light) and C+ (red) reaction, suggesting the presence of gyrophoric and possibly diploschistesic acids. A distinct purplish pigment, likely isohypocrellin, reacts K+ (green) but was not confirmed by thin-layer chromatography.

== Habitat and distribution ==
This species has been documented only in specific habitats within Brazil, including the primary rainforest of Mato Grosso and on sandstone under overhanging cliffs in Paraná. It exists alongside Tylophoron moderatum, another common species within the genus, but is distinguishable by its unique purplish pruina.
