= Stirtonia curvata =

Scientific classification
- Domain: Eukaryota
- Kingdom: Fungi
- Division: Ascomycota
- Class: Arthoniomycetes
- Order: Arthoniales
- Family: Arthoniaceae
- Genus: Stirtonia
- Species: S. curvata

Binomial name
- Stirtonia curvata Aptroot (2009)

Species of lichen

Stirtonia curvata is a species of crustose lichen belonging to the family Arthoniaceae. It was formally described as a new species in 2009 based on specimens collected from Indonesia.

== Taxonomy ==
Stirtonia curvata was described by the Dutch lichenologist André Aptroot from specimens collected by Willem Vink in 1959 near Manokwari in Irian Jaya, Indonesia. The species epithet curvata refers to the often curved shape of its ascospores. The genus Stirtonia includes lichens with distinctive ascigerous areas that lack a true hymenium, have round asci, and thick-walled, septate ascospores.

== Description ==
Stirtonia curvata has a crustose, smooth thallus that spreads over an area up to about 5 cm in diameter. It is typically whitish-yellow to brownish, thin (less than 0.1 mm), and somewhat shiny in appearance. The thallus contains calcium oxalate crystals, detectable under the microscope.

The ascigerous areas, where the reproductive structures are located, appear as angular or linear zones, branched or unbranched, slightly raised above the thallus surface, and typically measure 0.1–0.2 mm wide by up to 1 mm long. They are white, slightly fibrous (byssoid), and reveal distinct reddish-brown or black dots when abraded. No algal cells are found within these reproductive zones.

Microscopically, the asci are oval-shaped, with each typically containing four to eight ascospores. The ascospores themselves are ellipsoid, measuring 35–55 μm long by 12–19 μm wide, with 7–11 transverse septa, frequently presenting a curved shape. They have thick cell walls and septa, each over 1 μm thick. When stained with iodine (the IKI test), the lower portions and the area surrounding the asci turn blue, while the upper portions react with a violet coloration.

Chemically, S. curvata contains perlatolic acid, and the thallus does not react to standard chemical spot tests (C−, Pd−, K−, UV−).

== Habitat and distribution ==
This lichen species is found on tree bark in lowland tropical areas. Its documented distribution includes Western New Guinea and Java, Indonesia. It grows at low elevations (around 2 meters above sea level), indicating a preference for humid, tropical environments. Given its limited records, it is considered to be locally rare or at least infrequently collected.
