= Eremothecella nicobarica =

Scientific classification
- Kingdom: Fungi
- Division: Ascomycota
- Class: Arthoniomycetes
- Order: Arthoniales
- Family: Arthoniaceae
- Genus: Eremothecella
- Species: E. nicobarica

Binomial name
- Eremothecella nicobarica Jagad.Ram & G.P.Sinha (2019)
- Holotype: Shompen Hut forest, Great Nicobar Island

Species of lichen

Eremothecella nicobarica is a leaf-dwelling (foliicolous) lichen in the family Arthoniaceae, described from Great Nicobar Island, India. It forms thin, pale greenish-grey patches on living leaves in shaded evergreen forests and is distinguished from related species by its highly septate (internally divided) ascospores, which have 15–17 cross-walls. Currently known only from its type locality, the species was discovered in 2015 and formally described in 2019.

== Taxonomy ==
The species was described in 2019 by T.A.M. Jagadeesh Ram and G.P. Sinha as Eremothecella nicobarica. The holotype was collected on 30 May 2015 in the Shompen Hut forest along the East–West Road on Great Nicobar Island (10 m a.s.l.) and deposited in the Central National Herbarium, Howrah (CAL), with an isotype (duplicate) in the Regional Herbarium, Botanical Survey of India, Port Blair (PBL). The specific epithet refers to its discovery in the Nicobar Islands.

In diagnosis the authors distinguished E. nicobarica from similar members of the genus by its higher ascospore septation: it resembles E. macrosperma in having non-pruinose fruiting bodies (ascomata), but that species has only 7–12 septa; E. calamicola likewise lacks pruina yet has smaller, 5–7-septate spores.

== Description ==
The thallus (lichen body) forms thin, matt, pale greenish-grey patches on living leaves, typically 15–50 mm across and about 10–20 micrometres (μm) thick; it lacks a cortex and a distinct prothallus. The algal partner occurs in irregular to radiating plates of angular to rectangular cells (roughly 7–14 × 3–6 μm).

Ascomata are sharply delimited, scarcely raised, rounded to irregular discs 0.5–1.3 mm in diameter and 70–120 μm thick, dark brown to blackish-brown, and non-pruinose. The epithecium is a dense, periclinal layer (about 5–12 μm thick) that reacts K+ (sordid brown), I+ (orange-brown) and KI+ (ochraceous-yellow). The hymenium is 70–110 μm high and stains I+ (intensely orange-red), turning KI+ (blue) then quickly yellow. Paraphysoids are branched and anastomosing, about 1.0–1.5 μm wide.

Asci are obovate to more or less spherical, 65–100 × 52–70 μm, I−, with the ascus tholus KI+ (pale blue) internally. Ascospores are initially colourless, later pale brownish, clavate and gently curved, with the terminal cell enlarged and only slight constrictions at the septa; they are (14–)15–17-septate, measuring 60–72 × 10–13 μm.

Asexual structures are present: pycnidia are flattened, black, oval to drop-shaped (about 0.2–0.4 × 0.2–0.3 mm), producing very long, thread-like (filiform), multiseptate conidia 60–120 × 1.5–2.0 μm, often slightly wider at one end. Standard spot tests on the thallus are negative (K−, C−, KC−, P−) and thin-layer chromatography did not detect lichen substances.

== Habitat and distribution ==
Eremothecella nicobarica is a foliicolous lichen, growing on the surfaces of dicotyledonous leaves in the shaded understory of evergreen forest. It is known only from the type locality on Great Nicobar Island.
