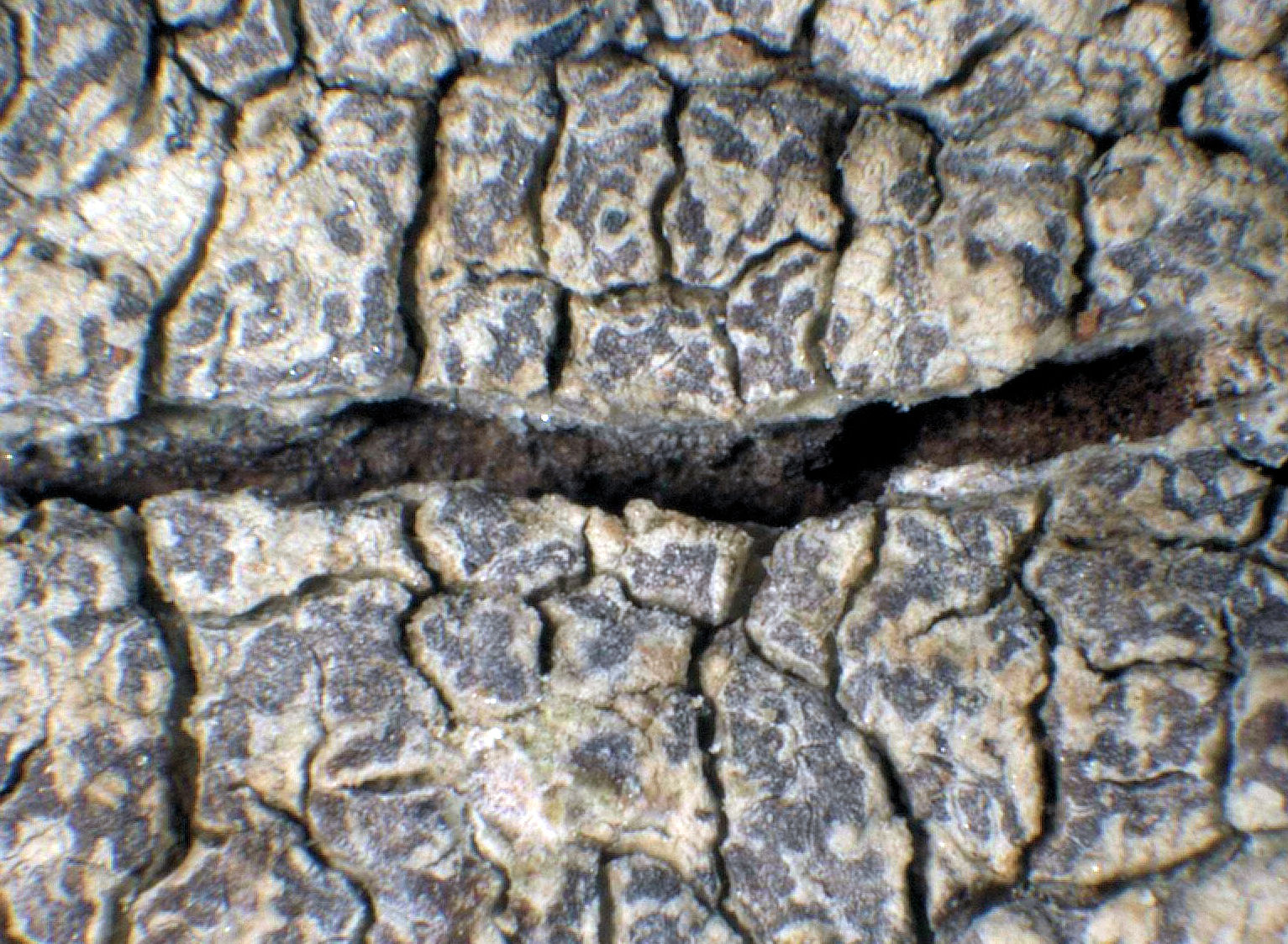
- Pachnolepia pruinata

Scientific classification
- Domain: Eukaryota
- Kingdom: Fungi
- Division: Ascomycota
- Class: Arthoniomycetes
- Order: Arthoniales
- Family: Arthoniaceae
- Genus: Pachnolepia; A.Massal. (1855)

Type species
- Pachnolepia pruinata (Torss.) Frisch & G.Thor (2014)

Species
- P. longipseudisidiata P. pruinata

= Pachnolepia =

Genus of lichens

Pachnolepia is a small fungal genus in the family Arthoniaceae. It comprises two species of corticolous (bark-dwelling) lichens.

== Taxonomy ==
Pachnolepia was originally circumscribed by the Italian lichenologist Abramo Bartolommeo Massalongo in 1855. The genus was resurrected for use in 2014 as part of a molecular phylogenetics-informed reorganisation of the Arthoniaceae.

The original type species of the genus, Pachnolepia impolita (now known as P. pruinata), was designated by Sundin et al. in 2012. Molecular studies revealed that this species occupies an isolated position within the cryptothecioid subclade, distinct from Arthonia radiata, supporting its recognition as a separate genus.

In a later phylogenetic analysis, Pachnolepia pruinata was shown to have a sister placement to Arthothelium spectabile, and both of these species form a clade that is sister to a clade contain two Tylophoron species.

A second species was added to the genus in 2024, when André Aptroot and colleagues described the species Pachnolepia longipseudisidiata, a lichexanthone-containing Brazilian endemic featuring long pseudoisidia. They noted, however, that "It is probably only distantly related to the type of the genus, so placement in a new genus in the future is to be expected".

== Description ==
Species of Pachnolepia form crustose lichens with distinctive morphological features. The thallus is typically effuse (spread out on the substrate), continuous, and can be whitish to pale grey or pale brown in colour. Surface texture varies from matt or powdery to somewhat verrucose, with thickness ranging from very thin (< 0.1 mm) to occasionally warty and up to 1 mm thick. The genus includes both fertile and sterile species.

When present, apothecia are up to 1 mm in diameter, rounded or angular, and may be elongated or somewhat stellate. They are characteristically immersed in the thallus and often appear inconspicuous when dry due to thick white pruina. The internal structure includes a red-brown epithecium that turns grey or pale green in potassium hydroxide solution (K), a colourless hymenium 40–60 μm tall, and numerous paraphysoids. Ascospores, when present, are cylindric to obovoid in shape, and usually contain 4 or 5 septa. They are colourless (hyaline) and measure 13–22 by 4.5–7 μm.

Some species produce reproductive structures other than apothecia, such as pseudoisidia, which can be cylindrical to gnarled and unbranched. The photobiont is trentepohlioid across the genus.

== Habitat and distribution ==
Members of the genus Pachnolepia are corticolous, growing on the bark of trees. In Europe, P. pruinata shows a preference for rain-sheltered, dry bark of tree trunks in nutrient-enriched situations, particularly favouring species such as Maple, Ash, and Oak. It can become locally dominant on tree trunks and is occasionally found on wooden boards and dry stonework. The species is frequent in southern Britain, extending locally to southern Aberdeenshire, while being uncommon and primarily eastern in distribution in Ireland.

In South America, P. longipseudisidiata has been documented in mountain forest habitats of Brazil, specifically in the Chapada Diamantina region, where it occurs at elevations of around 1,100 m (3,600 ft).
