= Stirtonia neotropica =

Scientific classification
- Domain: Eukaryota
- Kingdom: Fungi
- Division: Ascomycota
- Class: Arthoniomycetes
- Order: Arthoniales
- Family: Arthoniaceae
- Genus: Stirtonia
- Species: S. curvata

Binomial name
- Stirtonia curvata Aptroot (2009)

Species of lichen

Stirtonia neotropica is a species of crustose lichen in the family Arthoniaceae. It was first described in 2009 from specimens collected in the Neotropics, specifically from the Dutch Antilles and Costa Rica.

== Taxonomy ==
Stirtonia neotropica was described as a new species by the Dutch lichenologist André Aptroot based on a specimen collected by William R. Buck in January 2008 from Quill/Boven National Park on the island of Sint Eustatius in the Dutch Antilles. The species epithet neotropica refers to its distribution in the Neotropical region, a nod to its significance as the first species of the genus Stirtonia described from the Americas.

== Description ==
Stirtonia neotropica has a crustose, contiguous, and smooth thallus, spreading across areas up to 10 cm in diameter. The thallus is pale olive-colored, thin (less than 0.1 mm), and slightly glossy. This species does not contain calcium oxalate crystals, unlike several other species within the genus.

Its ascigerous areas, where reproductive asci are formed, are distinctly delimited as linear, branching, and interconnected (anastomosing) structures. These zones are white, slightly powdery (pruinose), and are flush with or only slightly raised above the surrounding thallus. When abraded, the ascigerous areas reveal conspicuous reddish-brown dots resulting from tiny crystals located above the asci. No algal cells are present within these reproductive structures.

Microscopic examination reveals reddish-brown, ovoid asci arranged in lines, each typically containing eight ellipsoid ascospores. The spores measure between 35 and 38 μm in length and 10–12 μm in width, with 7–11 transverse septa. All cells within the spores are roughly equal in size and possess notably thick walls and septa exceeding 1 μm thick. This species does not show a color reaction when treated with iodine solution (IKI−).

Chemically, Stirtonia neotropica contains gyrophoric acid, making it chemically distinctive among its congeners. The thallus and ascigerous zones are C+ (patchy red), but unreactive to other spot tests (Pd−, K−, and UV−).

== Habitat and distribution ==
Stirtonia neotropica is documented from tropical regions in the Americas, specifically from Sint Eustatius in the Dutch Antilles and the Caribbean coast of Costa Rica. It was first collected from elevations between 200 and 300 meters above sea level, growing on tree bark. The discovery of S. neotropica in these locations marked the expansion of the known geographical distribution of the genus Stirtonia from previously recognized ranges in Asia and Africa into the Neotropics.
