= Glomerulophoron mauritiae =

Scientific classification
- Kingdom: Fungi
- Division: Ascomycota
- Class: Arthoniomycetes
- Order: Arthoniales
- Family: Arthoniaceae
- Genus: Glomerulophoron
- Species: G. mauritiae

Binomial name
- Glomerulophoron mauritiae Frisch, Ertz & G.Thor (2015)
- Holotype: Sir Seewoosagur Ramgoolam Botanical Garden, Mauritius

Species of lichen

Glomerulophoron mauritiae is a species of corticolous (bark-dwelling) lichen in the family Arthoniaceae, and the type species of the genus Glomerulophoron. It was discovered growing on tree bark in a botanical garden in Mauritius, an island nation in the Indian Ocean. The lichen produces distinctive chains of microscopic spores in small, powdery structures on its surface.

== Taxonomy ==
The genus Glomerulophoron was introduced in 2015 for species that resemble small Sporodophoron but differ in having sporodochial conidia (asexual spores produced on a sporodochium) arranged in tightly coiled chains and in lacking the "lepraric high unknown" compound that characterises Sporodophoron; the two genera are closely related to each other and to Inoderma in phylogenetic analyses.

The holotype of G. mauritiae was collected on bark in the Sir Seewoosagur Ramgoolam Botanical Garden (Pamplemousses, Mauritius) at 85 m elevation on 18 February 2014. The protologue diagnoses the species by its coiled conidial chains of 1-celled, typically curved conidia (about 2–6 × 1.5–3.0 μm) and by a chemistry with 2'-O-methylperlatolic acid but no lepraric acid-related compounds.

== Description ==
The thallus (lichen body) forms small colonies to about 0.6 cm wide, usually outlined by pale brown lines where it meets neighbours (the prothallus). It is whitish to pale olivaceous grey, continuous, thin (to roughly 0.1 mm in section), and partly sunk in the outer bark; the surface lacks a true cortex (it is ecorticate) and appears matt and faintly scurfy. The photobiont is a trentepohlioid green alga with ellipsoid to roughly spherical (globose) cells (about 7–14 × 5–8 μm). Calcium oxalate crystals are scattered through the thallus. Apothecia (sexual fruiting bodies) are not known to occur in G. mauritiae.

Asexual structures are conspicuous but minute sporodochia (powdery pads that produce conidia) typically whitish, 0.1–0.2 mm across and up to about 0.05 mm tall, flat to weakly domed, and discrete to confluent. Conidia are produced from roughly 1.0–1.5 μm-wide hyphae in tightly coiled chains constricted at the septa; individual conidia are 1-celled, irregularly ellipsoid, usually curved, and typically about 3.1–5.0 × 1.5–2.5 μm, with thin hyaline walls and a gelatinous coat bearing fine pale granules.

Chemically, the species contains 2'-O-methylperlatolic acid. Routine spot tests on the thallus and sporodochia are K−, C−, KC−, Pd−; thallus hyphae are I− but KI+ (pale blue). The granular crystals in the sporodochia dissolve in K (potassium hydroxide solution) with a clear solution and in lactophenol cotton blue with precipitation of hyaline needles; they do not dissolve in sulphuric acid.

== Habitat and distribution ==
Glomerulophoron mauritiae is known from Mauritius, where it grows on smooth bark on the dry side of old trees in parkland settings. The type was collected in a large botanical garden surrounded by village and sugarcane fields at 85 m elevation.
