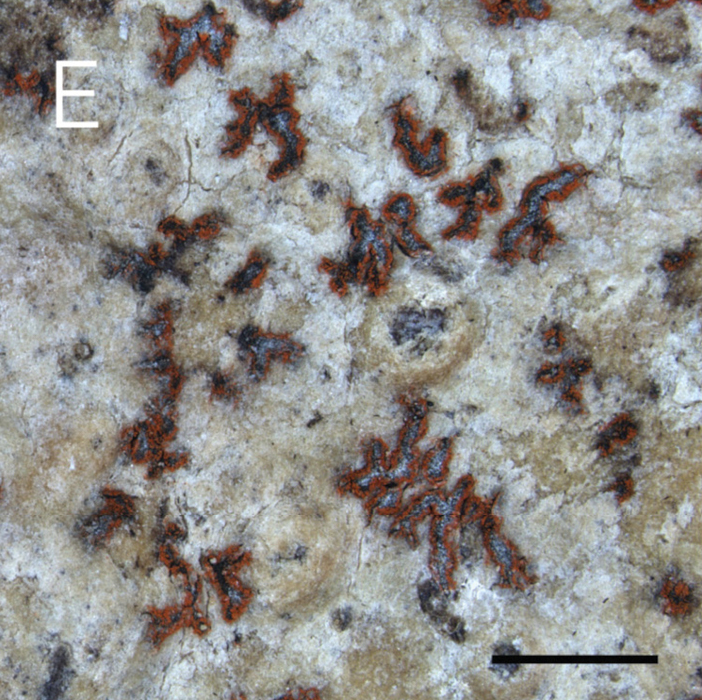
- Coniocarpon fallax in Norway. Scale bar: 1 mm

Scientific classification
- Kingdom: Fungi
- Division: Ascomycota
- Class: Arthoniomycetes
- Order: Arthoniales
- Family: Arthoniaceae
- Genus: Coniocarpon
- Species: C. fallax

Binomial name
- Coniocarpon fallax (Ach.) Grube (2014)

Synonyms
- Spiloma fallax Ach. (1803); Spiloma elegans Ach. (1810); Lichen elegans (Ach.) Lam. (1813); Coniocarpon elegans (Ach.) Duby (1830); Coniocarpon gregarium var. elegans (Ach.) Grognot (1863); Arthonia elegans (Ach.) Almq. (1880)

= Coniocarpon fallax =

Species of lichen-forming fungus

Coniocarpon fallax is a species of crustose lichen in the family Arthoniaceae. It forms a thin, pale grey-brown crust on the bark of deciduous trees and is recognised by its small, often star-shaped fruiting bodies with distinctive orange-red margins and dark centres. The species grows in humid forests with mild, oceanic climates and is considered rare throughout its range in Europe and the parts of Asia where it has been recorded. Originally described by Erik Acharius in 1803 as Spiloma fallax, it was transferred to the genus Coniocarpon in 2014 following molecular phylogenetic studies that restructured the classification of the Arthoniaceae.

== Taxonomy ==
The species now known as Coniocarpon fallax was first described by Erik Acharius in 1803 as Spiloma fallax, based on a lichen with an extremely thin, ash-grey crust and very delicate, minute, flattened dark brown to blackish pulvinate (swollen) spots irregularly scattered as a powdery dust on the smooth bark of trees. Acharius considered it a species of doubtful generic position and compared it with Christiaan Hendrik Persoon's Lepraria fallax on the basis of a specimen Persoon had sent to him. In 2014, Martin Grube transferred the species to Coniocarpon as Coniocarpon fallax.

Acharius later introduced a second name, Spiloma elegans, in 1810, based on material that is now treated as the same species as Coniocarpon fallax. The epithet elegans was subsequently transferred through several genera: Jean-Baptiste Lamarck recombined it as Lichen elegans in 1813, Jean Étienne Duby moved it to Coniocarpon elegans in 1830, and Camille Grognot treated it as Coniocarpon gregarium var. elegans in 1863. In 1880, Sigfrid Almquist transferred the taxon to Arthonia as Arthonia elegans. All of these names based on Acharius's elegans are now regarded as synonyms of Coniocarpon fallax.

A later phylogenetic and typification study of the Arthoniaceae designated Schleicher's original material of Spiloma elegans as lectotype and confirmed that it represents the same species as Coniocarpon fallax, thereby placing Spiloma elegans, Lichen elegans, Coniocarpon elegans and Arthonia elegans in synonymy with C. fallax and clarifying that earlier applications of Arthonia elegans to Synarthonia ochracea were misinterpretations.

== Description ==
Coniocarpon fallax forms a pale fawn to grey-brown crustose thallus that is smooth and ranges from faintly shiny to matt. Where it comes into contact with other lichens it may be bordered by a narrow dark grey to brown prothalline line. The ascomata are small, emergent structures with steeply sloping sides, typically 0.2–0.4 mm long, 0.1–0.2 mm wide and 65–110 micrometres (μm) tall. They are usually somewhat elongate and irregularly lirellate, and tend to occur in clusters of three to fifteen that can merge into short lirelline or star-like groups. The exposed discs are black to dark purple-black, flat to slightly convex and dull to only weakly glossy, sometimes carrying a thin dusting of white pruina. Their margins lie level with the disc and are conspicuously orange-red pruinose, often with additional patches of white pruina.

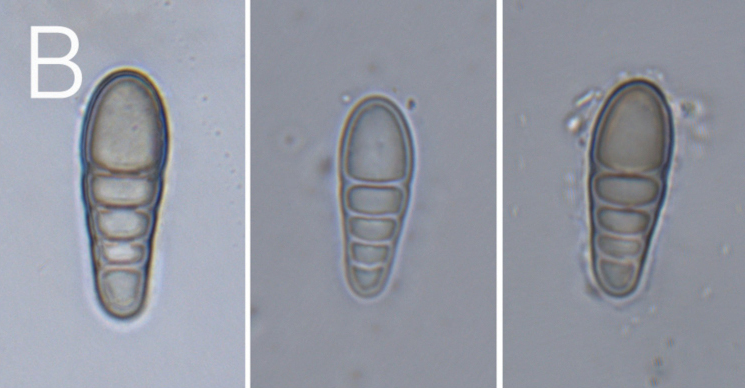
Ascospores of Coniocarpon fallax, showing their typical obovoid shape with an enlarged apical cell and three to four transverse septa.

In section, the exciple is brown and relatively thin (7–20 μm). The epithecium forms a brown layer 10–20 μm thick comprising the horizontally spreading, branched tips of the paraphysoidal hyphae, which are slightly expanded to about 3–4 μm wide and cohere in their lower parts. The hymenium beneath is colourless, strongly gelified and 35–70 μm tall, with paraphysoids 1–2 μm in diameter that are densely branched and interconnected to form a net-like tissue; the hypothecium is also colourless. Orange, red or purple granular pigments are typically present in the epithecium and exciple. The asci are of Arthonia type, long obpyriform to clavate, 50–75 × 20–32 μm, and contain eight spores. The ascospores are initially colourless and obovoid with an enlarged apical cell, usually with three to four transverse septa, but occasionally only one or as many as five, and they typically measure 17–20 × 7–9 μm, with extremes of 15–22 μm in length and 6–10 μm in width; at late maturity they become pale brown and develop a fine granular ornamentation. Spore development follows a macrocephalic pattern, meaning the apical cell enlarges noticeably during maturation. The lichen does not produce any lichen substances in its thallus (no distinctive spot test reactions) and is usually identified by its brightly pigmented apothecia.

== Habitat and distribution ==
Coniocarpon fallax has bright orange to reddish, often stellate apothecia visible on the bark surface. The lichen forms a thin crust (crustose thallus) that is mostly immersed in or just above the bark, and it typically colonises smooth-barked young trees. It grows on the bark of deciduous trees such as hazel (Corylus), ash (Fraxinus), and hornbeam (Carpinus), and has also been recorded on fir trees in humid, open woodlands. This species favours mild, oceanic or suboceanic climates – for example, it is often found in damp forests along rivers and in coastal woodlands where humidity is persistently high.

Coniocarpon fallax is rare throughout its range and has a patchy distribution. In Europe it is found from the Mediterranean region northwards into the humid temperate zone. Occurrences include oceanic parts of western and southern Europe (such as Great Britain and Italy) and montane regions like the Alps. In Scandinavia, it is confined to boreonemoral "rainforest" pockets along the Norwegian coast (for example in Vest-Agder, Rogaland, Hordaland and Møre og Romsdal counties), where the climate is consistently damp. Outside of Europe, C. fallax has been recorded in the Canary Islands (Macaronesia) and the Caucasus region. It has also been reported from East Asia; for instance, it was recently documented as a new lichen record in South Korea. According to the Norwegian Red List assessment, the species is rare and associated with older natural forests with long ecological continuity, especially boreonemoral rainforest and well-developed hazel scrub, which limits its distribution even within suitable regions.

== Ecology ==
Coniocarpon fallax is a corticolous lichen: it lives on bark and relies on a trentepohlioid green alga of the genus Trentepohlia as its photosynthetic partner (photobiont). This association is consistent with the species' occurrence in shaded, humid forest habitats. C. fallax typically occurs in species-rich epiphyte communities of humid deciduous woodlands. It often grows in association with other moisture-loving, oceanic lichens; for example, it is frequently found alongside Pseudoschismatomma rufescens, another rare corticolous lichen of humid forests. The main phorophytes (substrate trees) for C. fallax are smooth-barked hardwoods like ash and hazel, and populations are usually found in old or undisturbed forests where these trees are abundant.

This lichen is regarded as an indicator of ancient, undisturbed forest habitat. Coniocarpon fallax is vulnerable to habitat loss and air pollution. Forestry practices that remove deciduous hosts or convert forests to conifer plantations have a negative impact on its populations, as does the nitrogen enrichment of bark from air pollution (which encourages competing algae). Due to its rarity and declining trend, it is listed as a threatened species in several regions; for instance, it is categorized as Vulnerable in Italy's national lichen Red List and in Norway's red list (owing to small population size and ongoing decline). The Norwegian Red List assessment notes that conservation of old, humid forests with a high proportion of smooth-barked deciduous trees is important for maintaining populations of C. fallax.
