= Tylophoron stalactiticum =

Scientific classification
- Kingdom: Fungi
- Division: Ascomycota
- Class: Arthoniomycetes
- Order: Arthoniales
- Family: Arthoniaceae
- Genus: Tylophoron
- Species: T. stalactiticum

Binomial name
- Tylophoron stalactiticum Ertz & Diederich (2011)

Species of lichen-forming fungus

Tylophoron stalactiticum is a species of crustose lichen in the family Arthoniaceae. Described in 2011 from specimens collected in Tenerife in the Canary Islands, it is distinguished by its unusual growth form, with pale, cushion-like sporodochia (asexual spore-producing structures) that dangle from slender stalks resembling miniature stalactites. This rock-dwelling lichen is known only from its type locality, where it grows on the undersides of volcanic rock overhangs at mid-elevations.

== Taxonomy ==
Tylophoron stalactiticum was described as a new species in 2011 by Damien Ertz and Paul Diederich, in a study that treated the previously separate sporodochia-forming genus Blarneya as part of Tylophoron. Within that broader concept of Tylophoron, T. stalactiticum belongs to the group that produces pale, cushion-like sporodochia (asexual spore-producing structures). It is known from its type collection on Tenerife in the Canary Islands.

The species was separated from similar taxa by a combination of chemistry and growth form. In particular, it is saxicolous (growing on rock) and has stalked, hanging sporodochia, while the thallus itself is C− (showing no color change with the bleach spot test). The species epithet stalactiticum refers to the way the dangling, stalked sporodochia resemble stalactites.

== Description ==
The thallus is a superficial, felty crust on rock. It is white and lacks a cortex. Under the microscope, it is formed by hyaline (translucent), irregularly branched hyphae, and it produces many pale cream sporodochia, typically about 0.4–1 mm across. A distinctive feature is that these sporodochia sit at the ends of slender, hanging stipes (stalks) that are usually simple but can rarely fork. The stalks can be up to about 1.5 mm long and have a roughened surface. A whitish, cottony margin (prothallus) may be present around the thallus, about 0.5–1 mm wide. The photosynthetic partner (photobiont) is the filamentous green alga Trentepphlia.

The sporodochia produce hyaline conidia (asexual spores) that are usually nonseptate but can also be one-septate, with rounded to blunt ends. Simple conidia are commonly about 5.5–7.5 × 3–4 μm, and one-septate conidia about 8.5–12.5 × 3–4 μm (with wider extremes reported in the original measurements). Sexual fruiting bodies and pycnidia have not been observed. In standard chemical spot tests, the thallus and the stalks are negative (C−, K−, KC−, P−, UV−), but the sporodochia react C+ (red), K+ (yellowish), and KC+ (red). Thin-layer chromatography detected lecanoric acid, with additional compounds reported in trace or tentative form.

== Habitat and distribution ==
Tylophoron stalactiticum is known only from a single locality on Tenerife (Canary Islands). The type specimen was collected at about 565 m (1,854 ft) elevation, on volcanic rock, in a site characterized by volcanic boulders. The species has been reported growing on the undersides of rock overhangs (underhangs), where its hanging, stalked sporodochia can develop in sheltered positions.
