= Glomerulophoron =

Scientific classification
- Domain: Eukaryota
- Kingdom: Fungi
- Division: Ascomycota
- Class: Arthoniomycetes
- Order: Arthoniales
- Family: Arthoniaceae
- Genus: Glomerulophoron; Frisch, Ertz & G.Thor (2015)

Type species
- Glomerulophoron mauritiae Frisch, Ertz & G.Thor (2015)

Species
- G. confluentisorediatum G. mauritiae

Genus of lichen

Glomerulophoron is a small genus of lichen-forming fungi in the family Arthoniaceae. The genus contains two species of corticolous (bark-dwelling) crustose lichens. It was circumscribed in 2015 by the lichenologists Andreas Frisch, Damien Ertz, and Göran Thor. It was created to contain a single species from Mauritius, G. mauritiae, which was distinct from the similar genus Sporodophoron both genetically and morphologically, in the tightly coiled chains of sporodochial conidia. The genus gained another member in 2024 when the Brazilian species G. confluentisorediatum was added to it. It is distinguished from the type species by the absence of sporodochia.
