= Stirtonia psoromica =

Scientific classification
- Domain: Eukaryota
- Kingdom: Fungi
- Division: Ascomycota
- Class: Arthoniomycetes
- Order: Arthoniales
- Family: Arthoniaceae
- Genus: Stirtonia
- Species: S. curvata

Binomial name
- Stirtonia curvata Aptroot & Wolseley (2009)

Species of lichen

Stirtonia psoromica is a corticolous (bark-dwelling) crustose lichen in the family Arthoniaceae. It was described as a new species in 2009 based on specimens collected in Thailand.

== Taxonomy ==
Stirtonia psoromica was first described from material collected by Pat Wolseley and Begoña Aguirre-Hudson in 1991 at Doi Suthep, Chiang Mai province, Thailand. The species epithet psoromica refers to the presence of psoromic acid, a secondary metabolite characteristic of this lichen.

== Description ==
The thallus of Stirtonia psoromica is crustose, contiguous, smooth, and spreads up to 5 cm in diameter. It is thin (less than 0.1 mm thick), dirty white in color, and somewhat shiny. The presence of calcium oxalate crystals in the thallus is characteristic, although the thallus does not react with iodine (IKI−).

Ascigerous areas are distinct, rounded, or slightly elongated, measuring about 0.3–0.7 mm in diameter. They are prominently elevated above the thallus surface, white, and lightly powdery (pruinose). When damaged, these areas show subtle black dots, indicating underlying crystals. Algal cells are absent from the ascigerous areas.

Microscopic features include black, ovoid asci visible on the surface, each containing eight ascospores. The spores are large and fusiform (spindle-shaped), measuring approximately 75–87 μm long by 12–16 μm wide. They typically have 7–9 transverse septa with cells roughly equal in size. Spore walls and septa are notably thick, each exceeding 1 μm. The ascigerous zones give a positive blue reaction with iodine (IKI+).

Chemically, S. psoromica contains psoromic and conpsoromic acids. When tested chemically, the thallus gives a positive yellow reaction with para-phenylenediamine (Pd+ yellow) but no reactions to other tests (C−, K−, and UV−).

== Habitat and distribution ==
Stirtonia psoromica is known from Thailand, where it was originally discovered near Doi Suthep in Chiang Mai Province, and subsequently also recorded in Uthai Thani Province. It grows on bark at tropical altitudes, suggesting a preference for humid, forested environments. The species is considered locally rare.
