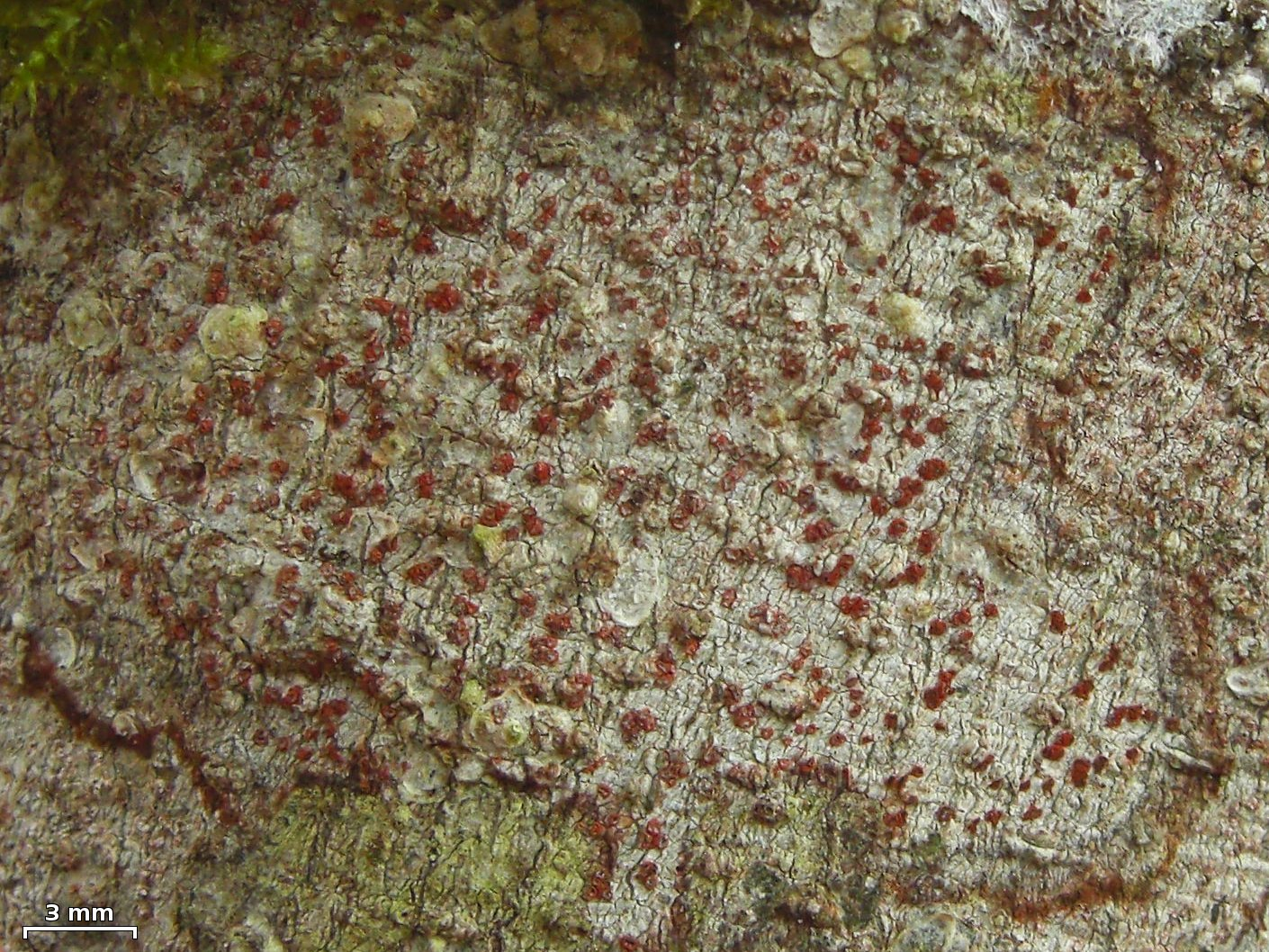
- Coniocarpon cinnabarinum

Scientific classification
- Kingdom: Fungi
- Division: Ascomycota
- Class: Arthoniomycetes
- Order: Arthoniales
- Family: Arthoniaceae
- Genus: Coniocarpon; DC. (1805)

Type species
- Coniocarpon cinnabarinum DC. (1805)

Species
- see text

= Coniocarpon =

Genus of lichen-forming fungi

Coniocarpon is a genus of lichen-forming fungi in the family Arthoniaceae. It has eight species of corticolous (bark-dwelling) lichens. This genus is distinct for its crystalline orange, red, and purple quinoid pigments in the ascomata that turn purple in potassium hydroxide solution, its colourless, transversely septate ascospores with large apical cells, and its rounded to lirellate ascomata (fruiting bodies).

== Taxonomy ==
The genus was circumscribed by Augustin Pyramus de Candolle in 1805. The genus was rejected against Arthonia as proposed in the International Code of Nomenclature for algae, fungi, and plants in Appendices I–VII. In 2014 however, Coniocarpon was resurrected by Andreas Frisch and colleagues for the Arthonia cinnabarina species complex, based on the results of molecular phylogenetics analysis, which showed that it formed a clade with the genus Reichlingia. The type species of the genus, Coniocarpon cinnabarinum, had previously been designated by Rolf Santesson in 1952.

== Description ==
The genus Coniocarpon, as revitalized by Frisch and colleagues in 2014, comprises lichens with a smooth thallus that is either immersed or slightly protruding, typically pale brown and often outlined by a dark line. Its photobiont is of the trentepohlioid type. The apothecia (fruiting bodies) of these lichens are irregularly rounded to weakly lobed, either lirellate or stellate, and emerge singly or in clusters. The true exciple is brown, consisting of compressed, vertically aligned paraphysoidal hyphae, which sometimes form short hairs on the outer margin and may have old bark cells attached.

The disc of the apothecia is dark, ranging from flat to slightly convex, and may have a white pruinose surface, sometimes overlaid with an orange-red pruina, with margins that are level with the disc and may also be prominently orange-red pruinose, containing crystals. The epithecium is brown, composed of branched tips of paraphysoidal hyphae that extend horizontally above the asci. The hymenium is colourless and strongly conglutinated, with a hamathecium of densely branched and netted paraphysoids. The hypothecium is also colourless.

The asci of Coniocarpon are of the Arthonia-type, obpyriform to clavate in shape, and typically contain eight spores. Its ascospores are colourless, obovoid with an enlarged apical cell, turning pale brown with granular ornamentation at maturity. Chemically, the exciple and epithecium react blue upon staining with solutions of iodine and potassium iodide, while the hymenium and hypothecium react red with iodine and blue with potassium iodide. The orange-red crystals dissolve in potassium hydroxide solution to form a transient, purplish solution.

== Species ==
- Coniocarpon carneoumbrinum (Zahlbr.) Van den Broeck & Ertz (2018)
- Coniocarpon chishuiense Lin Zhi He & S.B.Fu (2025) – China
- Coniocarpon cinnabarinum DC. (1805)
- Coniocarpon coralloideum Kalb & J.E.Hern. (2012) – Ecuador, Venezuela
- Coniocarpon cuspidans (Nyl.) Moen, Frisch & Grube (2020)
- Coniocarpon fallax (Ach.) Grube (2014)
- Coniocarpon foliicola Aptroot (2022) – Brazil
- Coniocarpon piccolioides Aptroot & Cáceres (2018) – Brazil
- Coniocarpon rubrocinctum (G.Merr. ex Grube & Lendemer) Perlmutter, R.Miranda & Bungartz (2023)
- Coniocarpon tuckermanianum (Willey) Van den Broeck & Ertz (2018)
