= Cryptophaea (lichen) =

Scientific classification
- Kingdom: Fungi
- Division: Ascomycota
- Class: Arthoniomycetes
- Order: Arthoniales
- Family: Arthoniaceae
- Genus: Cryptophaea

Type species
- Cryptophaea phaeospora van den Broeck & Ertz (2016)

Species
- C. constrictopseudisidiata C. lichexanthopseudisidiata C. lichexanthosorediata C. phaeospora

Genus of lichen-forming fungi

Cryptophaea is a genus of lichen-forming fungi in the family Arthoniaceae. Initially described as a monotypic genus in 2016 with the type species, C. phaeospora, from the Congo Basin, it was expanded in 2024 to include four species of crustose lichens found in Brazil. Cryptophaea species are characterised by their firmly attached thalli, which are typically whitish grey-green and hydrophobic. The genus has diverse morphological features, including pseudoisidia and soredia in some species. Cryptophaea lichens are corticolous, growing on tree bark in various tropical forest ecosystems, from near sea level to elevations over 1000 metres. Recent molecular phylogenetic studies have revealed complex relationships between Cryptophaea and other genera within Arthoniaceae, suggesting potential taxonomic revisions may be necessary as more data becomes available.

== Taxonomy ==
The fungal genus Cryptophaea was circumscribed by Dries Van den Broeck and Damien Ertz in 2016. The type specimen of Cryptophaea phaeospora was collected in the Democratic Republic of the Congo, specifically in Yangambi, Tshopo District (Orientale Province). It was found on a free-standing, unidentified tree species in a garden along the road near the herbarium of Yangambi. The specimen was collected at an elevation of 436 m (1,430 ft), on 13 November 2013, by Van den Broeck. The genus name combines crypto, alluding to the cryptotheciod fruiting bodies, with phaea, which refers to the brown fructifications. The species epithet phaeospora makes reference to the brown-coloured ascospores.

In 2024, the genus was significantly expanded with the description of three new species based on specimens collected in various locations across Brazil. This study also provided new insights into the phylogenetic relationships within the genus and its position within the Arthoniaceae. The research revealed that the genus Cryptophaea is more diverse than initially thought, encompassing species with varying morphological features such as pseudoisidia and soredia, which were not present in the type species.

Molecular phylogenetic analysis showed that Cryptophaea species form a distinct clade within the Arthoniaceae, but with complex relationships to other genera. Some species previously thought to belong to other genera, such as Cryptothecia or Herpothallon, were found to be more closely related to Cryptophaea. The study suggested that the expanded Cryptophaea might be polyphyletic, with some newly described species potentially forming separate lineages. This indicates that further taxonomic revisions may be necessary as more data becomes available.

From a biogeographic perspective, the discovery of multiple Cryptophaea species in Brazil, far from the original Congo Basin location of C. phaeospora, suggests a potentially wider distribution of the genus in tropical regions globally.

== Description ==
The crustose thallus of Cryptophaea is firmly attached to its substrate and has a whitish grey-green colour. It is slightly byssoid (resembling fine filaments), continuous, and lacks any pseudoisidia or pseudoisidoid structures. The thallus is relatively thin, measuring about 20–40 μm in thickness, and is hydrophobic (repels water). When in contact with other lichens, a reddish border can be observed; otherwise, the prothallus (the initial growth stage of the lichen) is distinct, white, and byssoid, composed mainly of interwoven and radiating hyphae (filamentous fungal structures).

The photobiont (photosynthetic partner) in Cryptophaea is trentepohlioid, meaning it belongs to the genus Trentepohlia, which is a type of green algae. These photobionts are characterised by unbranched or branched chains of angular-rounded cells, measuring 7–30 by 4–7.5 μm. They are abundant within the ascigerous areas (regions containing the reproductive structures) and are often visible as white to brownish hair-like structures on the ascomata (fruiting bodies). The ascomata are distinctly visible and appear as regularly rounded to irregularly elongate structures, brownish, tomentose (covered with fine hairs), emergent (raised above the thallus surface), convex, and hydrophobic. They range in size from 0.2 to 1.2 by 0.15–0.5 mm. Young ascomata are typically covered or surrounded by a bright orange pruina (a powdery or crystalline coating).

The internal structure of the ascomata includes a hymenium (the spore-bearing layer) that is 60–90 μm tall and does not stain with iodine (I–, KI–). Interascal filaments (thread-like structures among the asci) are few, hyaline (translucent), branched, wavy, and 1.1–2.7 μm wide. They do not widen or change colour at the tips. The asci (spore-producing cells) are obovoid to ellipsoid, measuring 20–30 by 10–18 μm, and also do not stain with iodine. They follow the Arthothelium-type pattern. Each ascus contains eight ascospores, which are hyaline initially but soon turn greyish to brownish. The ascospores are ellipsoid, 9–13 by 6–8 μm, and mostly muriform (divided into compartments), with 6–9 locules (compartments). The terminal cells are often larger and undivided, with a hyaline perispore (outer spore layer).

Recent studies have expanded our understanding of the morphological diversity within the genus Cryptophaea. Some species now known to belong to this genus may exhibit the following characteristics:

- The thallus can be corticate or non-corticate, and may or may not be surrounded by a prothallus.
- Some species produce pseudoisidia, which can vary in shape from roughly spherical (globose) to elongated. These pseudoisidia may be constricted at the base in certain species.
- Other species develop soredia, either in distinct soralia or dispersed across the thallus.
- While the type species C. phaeospora produces ascomata, some recently described species are known only in their sterile states.

The thallus and apothecial sections generally do not react with common chemical spot tests (K−, C−, KC−, PD−, UV−). However, young ascomata surrounded or covered by an orange pruina react with K (potassium hydroxide) to produce a purplish colour. No calcium oxalate crystals are observed after treatment with sulphuric acid. Thin-layer chromatography identifies three substances: parietin (an anthraquinone) that shows a bright yellow-orange spot under ultraviolet light before heating, and two unknown substances showing a pinkish-red spot and a second substance visible under short wavelength UV light before heating. Some species contain lichexanthone, which causes the thallus to fluoresce yellow under UV light, while others may contain confluentic acid or divaricatic acid.

== Habitat and distribution ==
At the time of its original publication, Cryptophaea phaeospora was known to occur only from the village of Yangambi, located in the Congo Basin. It was found in two nearby localities within this region. The species grows on the bark of free-standing, exposed trees in gardens close to the road. It has not been observed in the dense tropical forests along the Congo River, suggesting that it is likely absent in more shaded environments.

Subsequent studies have expanded the known distribution of the genus Cryptophaea, with some new species discovered in various locations across Brazil. The known distribution of Cryptophaea species includes:

- C. phaeospora: Democratic Republic of the Congo, specifically in Yangambi, Tshopo District (Orientale Province).
- C. constrictopseudisidiata: Bahia state, Brazil, in the Chapada Diamantina region near Lençóis.
- C. lichexanthopseudisidiata: Bahia state, Brazil, also in the Chapada Diamantina region near Lençóis.
- C. lichexanthosorediata: Bahia state, Brazil, in the same area as the previous two species.

The habitat preferences of Cryptophaea species appear to be diverse within tropical forest ecosystems. They have been found in:

- Gardens with free-standing, exposed trees (C. phaeospora).
- Primary Atlantic rainforest (C. constrictopseudisidiata, C. lichexanthopseudisidiata, C. lichexanthosorediata).
- Transitional forests between Atlantic rainforest and Caatinga.

All known species grow on tree bark (corticolous), but they have been found at varying elevations, from near sea level to altitudes of over 1000 meters. The discovery of multiple species in Brazil suggests that the genus may be more widespread in tropical regions than initially thought, and future studies may reveal additional species and expand the known distribution further.
