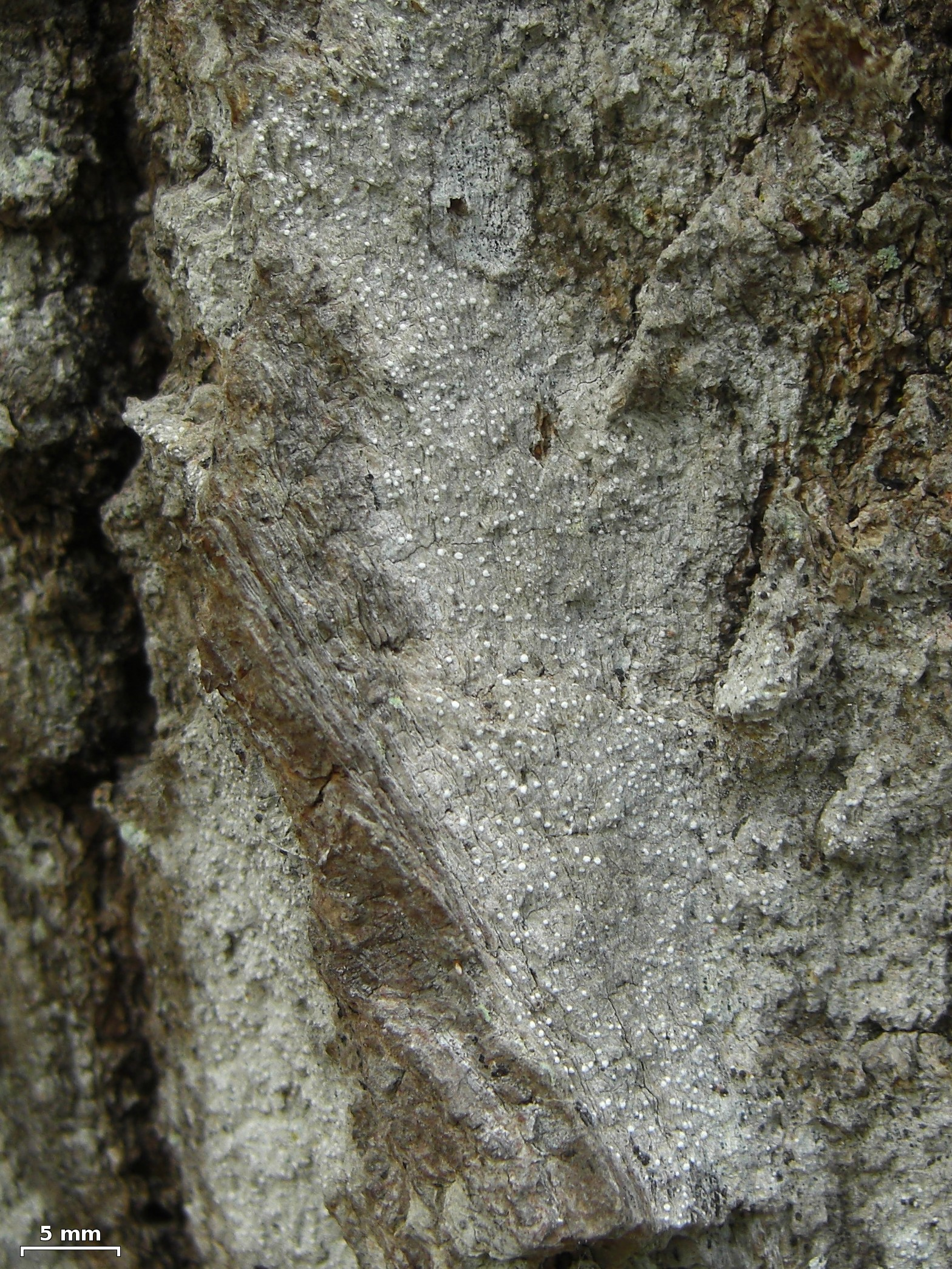
- Sporodophoron americanum

Scientific classification
- Domain: Eukaryota
- Kingdom: Fungi
- Division: Ascomycota
- Class: Arthoniomycetes
- Order: Arthoniales
- Family: Arthoniaceae
- Genus: Sporodophoron; Frisch, Y.Ohmura, Ertz & G.Thor 2015 (2015)

Type species
- Sporodophoron gossypinum Frisch, Y.Ohmura & G.Thor (2015)

Species
- S. americanum S. cretaceum S. gossypinum S. primorskiense

= Sporodophoron =

Genus of lichen-forming fungi

Sporodophoron is a genus of lichen-forming fungi in the family Arthoniaceae. It includes four corticolous (bark-dwelling) crustose lichen species. Sporodophoron is uniquely characterised by the formation of fruiting structures called sporodochia, which are open conidiomata in the form of tufts of conidiophores on the thallus. Although these lichens bear a strong resemblance to Inoderma, another genus within the same family, Sporodophoron's distinct chemical makeup sets it apart from its lichen relatives. Collectively, the genus has a widespread geographical distribution in the Northern Hemisphere, with species found in distinct habitats in North America, Europe, Japan, and the Russian Far East.

== Taxonomy ==
Sporodophoron was circumscribed as a new genus in 2015 by the lichenologists Andreas Frisch, Yoshishito Ohmura, Damien Ertz and Göran Thor. Previously published molecular phylogenetics analyses had previously shown that several genera in the family Arthoniaceae were polyphyletic; Sporodophoron was erected to accommodate a monophyletic grouping of four of these misclassified Arthoniaceae species. Its name was inspired by its prominent sporodochia, which are clusters of spores that resemble the anamorph, or asexual reproductive stage, of the distantly related genus, Tylophoron. The type species is Sporodophoron gossypinum, which was simultaneously described as new by the same group of researchers. In this species, found in Japan, the species epithet gossypinum alludes to the sporodochia's resemblance to tiny bundles of cotton.

== Description ==
Sporodophoron shares many characteristics with the genus Inoderma, but a major distinguishing feature is the formation of sporodochia in place of pycnidia. The sporodochia are whitish and convex, and can either be isolated or fused together in the central part of the thallus, the lichen's main body. The sporodochial conidia, or asexual spores, are formed in a zigzag pattern and occasionally branch out. They come in a variety of shapes, from rounded to elliptical to short cylindrical, and vary in size depending on the species.

Sporodophoron gossypinum stands out due to its distinctive apothecia, or spore-producing structures, which are densely white and pruinose. The apothecia are adnate, meaning they lie flat against the thallus, and range in diameter from 0.6 to 1.7 mm. The ascospores (sexual spores) typically have 1 to 2 septa – partitions within the spore – with a slightly enlarged apical cell.

The photobiont of Sporodophoron is trentepohlioid, meaning it resembles or belongs to the green algal genus Trentepohlia.

== Chemistry ==
The chemical make-up of Sporodophoron is distinct, containing a compound related to lepraric acid that is found in all species of this genus. This compound is referred to by the authors as 'lepraric high unknown' due to its similar characteristics to lepraric acid. It also contains 2'-O-methylperlatolic acid and an unidentified fatty acid. A series of trace compounds that are likely related to the lepraric high unknown are found in certain species, such as S. americanum and S. cretaceum.

== Relationship with other genera ==
Despite its close relationship with Inoderma, Sporodophoron is distinguished by its unique sporodochia. Furthermore, the 'lepraric high unknown' compound is exclusive to this genus. Species with sporodochia that appear similar are found in Tylophoron, yet these have more regularly shaped sporodochial conidia, and their thallus chemistry includes lecanoric acid, a compound not found in Sporodophoron. A species known as Sporodochiolichen flavus, which was previously considered a part of Tylophoron, shows some similarities with Sporodophoron, but it also has significant differences in how its conidia are formed. Moreover, the species contains an unidentified yellow pigment, but it lacks the compounds associated with lepraric and confluentic acids that are present in Sporodophoron.

Inoderma and Sporodophoron share a key characteristic – a distinct K+ (yellow) spot reaction in the thallus, sporodochia, and the pruina (a powdery coating) on conidiomata and apothecia. In Inoderma, this reaction is caused by lepraric acid, while in Sporodophoron, the reaction is instigated by a compound seemingly related to lepraric acid. However, Inoderma byssaceum and I. afromontanum are exceptions within the genus Inoderma, as they do not display this reaction.

Glomerulophoron mauritiae, alongside Sporodophoron cretaceum and S. gossypinum, contain 2'-O-methylperlatolic acid. However, Sporodophoron cretaceum and S. gossypinum also contain a series of trace compounds that are potentially related to lepraric acid, compounds which remain unidentified. In addition, S. gossypinum contains an unknown fatty acid.

== Habitat and distribution ==
The genus Sporodophoron has a widespread geographical distribution, with species found in distinct habitats in North America, Europe, Japan, and the Russian Far East. Sporodophoron americanum has a relatively limited geographical presence, with confirmed sightings in the easternmost regions of Tennessee and North Carolina, United States. This species is typically found in mixed hardwood and oak-juniper forests, where it thrives on a variety of trees, such as species of Quercus and Acer. S. americanum has also been observed on dead roots and rock surfaces under overhangs. The altitude at which these specimens have been collected varies greatly, spanning approximately 700–2,000 m (2,300–6,600 ft) above sea level. Contrastingly, Sporodophoron cretaceum prefers the dry sides of aged trees situated along old waysides, and within parkland and woodland environments. This species has been observed in Western Continental Europe, extending north to the British Isles. In Italy, it has been included in the red list of epiphytic lichens.

Sporodophoron gossypinum, native to Japan, favours steep, rain-sheltered siliceous rocks within deciduous or mixed forests. This species has also been discovered on the semi-shaded basement walls of Hikone Castle in Hikone city. The maximum recorded elevation for S. gossypinum is 1,020 m (3,350 ft). S. gossypinum was later reported to occur in Russia, in the south of the Primorye Territory. Sporodophoron primorskiense was identified in a single location in Primorsky in the Russian Far East. This species was found on the bark of a broadleaf tree situated within a mixed forest alongside a stream, at an elevation of 220 m (720 ft).

== Species ==
As of January 2024, Species Fungorum (in the Catalogue of Life) accepts four species of Sporodophoron:

- Sporodophoron americanum (Lendemer, E.A.Tripp & R.C.Harris) Ertz & Frisch (2015)
- Sporodophoron cretaceum (Hue) Ertz & Frisch (2015)
- Sporodophoron gossypinum Frisch, Y.Ohmura & G.Thor (2015)
- Sporodophoron primorskiense Frisch & Y.Ohmura (2015)
