= Briancoppinsia =

Scientific classification
- Kingdom: Fungi
- Division: Ascomycota
- Class: Arthoniomycetes
- Order: Arthoniales
- Family: Arthoniaceae
- Genus: Briancoppinsia; Diederich, Ertz, Lawrey & van den Boom (2012)
- Species: B. cytospora

Binomial name
- Briancoppinsia cytospora (Vouaux) Diederich, Ertz, Lawrey & van den Boom (2012)

Synonyms
- Phyllosticta cytospora Vouaux (1914); Phoma cytospora (Vouaux) D.Hawksw. (1976)

Single-species fungal genus

Briancoppinsia is a fungal genus in the family Arthoniaceae. It is monotypic, containing the single species Briancoppinsia cytospora, a lichenicolous fungus that parasitises parmelioid lichens, as well as Cladonia, Lepra, and Lecanora conizaeoides, among others. The species was first described scientifically by Léon Vouaux in 1914 as Phyllosticta cytospora.

Its morphology is reminiscent of Phoma cytospora, a lichenicolous coelomycete found on several genera of lichens. However, B. cytospora has several distinct characters, both anatomical, chemical and within DNA sequence that characterised it as a different species.

== Taxonomy ==
The genus was circumscribed in 2012 by Paul Diederich, Damien Ertz, James Lawrey, and Pieter van den Boom. The genus was named for Brian John Coppins, who is, according to the authors, an "eminent British lichenologist and expert of lichenicolous fungi".

== Description ==
Rather than forming its own visible body (thallus), Briancoppinsia cytospora grows on other lichens—a condition known as being lichenicolous. It is most commonly found on members of the family Parmeliaceae, including genera such as Evernia, Hypogymnia, and Parmelia, and occasionally on Lecanora species. Infected host lichens often display some degree of tissue damage (necrosis).

Briancoppinsia cytospora does not produce ascomata (the typical fruiting bodies seen in many other lichen fungi). Instead, it reproduces through tiny, spherical spore-producing structures called pycnidia. These pycnidia, which measure approximately 50–80 μm across, are partially embedded in the host's thallus or in the host's own reproductive structures. They are dark brown to black and roughly ball-shaped, with their base slightly flattened. When young, each pycnidium has a small, pinpoint-like opening (ostiole). As it matures, this opening can enlarge to the point where it becomes as wide as the pycnidium itself, revealing the white, spore-containing interior. Unlike similar fungi, Briancoppinsia cytospora does not release its spores in visible, white drops.

The wall of the pycnidium is relatively thin (5–7 μm) and made up of tightly packed, short fungal filaments. Chemical tests show that this wall turns a dark olive colour when treated with potassium (K), and a mixture of iodine (I) and potassium iodine (K/I) solutions causes the gel inside the pycnidium to stain red. Within the pycnidium, the spore-producing cells (conidiogenous cells) line the inner cavity. These cells are colourless, shaped like short flasks, and do not grow additional cells after they release their spores.

The spores (conidia) themselves are abundant and measure roughly 5–7 μm in length and 1.6–2.0 μm in width. They are usually elongated and slightly curved, with a rounded tip and a squared-off base. The conidia are colourless, do not have internal dividers (aseptate), and their walls are thin and smooth. They do not contain noticeable oil droplets.

In appearance, the fungal colonies of Briancoppinsia cytospora growing on Evernia may resemble other lichen-inhabiting fungi. For example, Phoma everniae produces smaller pycnidia and spores, while Everniicola flexispora has strongly curved, one-septate spores. However, these similar fungi are poorly understood, and their relationships to Briancoppinsia are not yet clear.

== Habitat and distribution ==
In the United Kingdom, Briancoppinsia cytospora has been reported in southern England, west Wales, Scotland, and Ireland, where it can be found subtly embedded within the tissues of its host lichens.
