= Helicobolomyces =

Scientific classification
- Domain: Eukaryota
- Kingdom: Fungi
- Division: Ascomycota
- Class: Arthoniomycetes
- Order: Arthoniales
- Family: Arthoniaceae
- Genus: Helicobolomyces; Matzer (1995)
- Species: H. lichenicola

Binomial name
- Helicobolomyces lichenicola Matzer (1995)

Genus of fungi

Helicobolomyces is a fungal genus in the family Arthoniaceae. This is a monotypic genus, containing the single species Helicobolomyces lichenicola. This parasitic fungus lives on thin-crusted lichens in humid tropical mountain forests, appearing as scattered, pin-head-sized orange spots that erupt through the host lichen's surface and turn dark violet when treated with potassium hydroxide solution. It produces distinctive spores built from tiny spherical cells arranged in a tight helical chain surrounded by a gelatinous sheath, giving them a twisted-ribbon appearance under the microscope.

== Taxonomy ==
Helicobolomyces was introduced by Martin Matzer in the early 1990s to accommodate a distinctive lichen-dwelling (lichenicolous) fungus collected in the montane rainforests of Costa Rica. The type and only species, H. lichenicola, grows on thalli of crustose lichens such as Porina and Trichothelium. Although its minute orange structures were long confused with fruit bodies of the unrelated lichen Arthonia cinnabarinula, chemical tests and co-occurrence of the sexual and asexual states on the same host thallus revealed that the two represent different life-cycle stages of the same fungus. Because no existing genus matched its combination of orange-pigmented conidiomata, helical conidia and particular chemical reactions, Matzer erected Helicobolomyces as a monotypic genus.

== Description ==
The fungus appears as scattered, pin-head-sized asexual fruit bodies (conidiomata) that erupt through the host lichen's surface. Each is rounded, flat to slightly domed, and measures 0.02–0.075 mm across. Viewed from above they are reddish-brown to bright orange; a drop of potassium hydroxide solution instantly turns them dark violet, a diagnostic reaction caused by the dissolved pigment. In section the fruit body consists of a rim of colourless to pale-brown, septate hyphae coated in orange pigment, surrounding a central gelatinous mass packed with conidia.

Conidiophores—short, hyaline stalk cells—arise from the inner wall and produce the spores at their ends. The spores themselves start colourless but become light brown at maturity; they measure 5–18 × 5–9 μm overall and are built from tiny (2–4 μm) spherical cells arranged in a tight helical chain. A thin gelatinous sheath surrounds the chain and fills the spaces between cells, giving the spore a twisted-ribbon appearance under the microscope. Iodine stains this sheath blue, showing it is hemi-amyloid.

== Habitat and distribution ==
Helicobolomyces lichenicola is restricted to humid tropical forests. It has been recorded from montane sites (about 750–2,200 m elevation) in Costa Rica's Cordillera Central and Cordillera de Talamanca, Brazil's Serra do Mar, and from Java in Indonesia. Wherever it occurs, it parasitises thin-crusted lichens growing on shaded leaves and bark, forming its orange conidiomata either beside or intermixed with the red sexual apothecia traditionally referred to Arthonia cinnabarinula.
