= Eremothecella =

Scientific classification
- Domain: Eukaryota
- Kingdom: Fungi
- Division: Ascomycota
- Class: Arthoniomycetes
- Order: Arthoniales
- Family: Arthoniaceae
- Genus: Eremothecella; Syd. & P.Syd. (1917)

Type species
- Eremothecella calamicola Syd. & P.Syd. (1917)

Species
- E. ajaysinghii E. calamicola E. cyaneoides E. helicella E. macrocephala E. microcephalica E. nicobarica

Synonyms
- Nematidia Stirt. (1879)

Genus of fungi

Eremothecella is a genus of lichenized fungi in the family Arthoniaceae. The genus is widespread in tropical areas.

== Species ==
As of July 2024, Species Fungorum (in the Catalogue of Life) accepts seven species of Eremothecella:

- Eremothecella ajaysinghii Jagad.Ram & G.P.Sinha (2019)
- Eremothecella calamicola Syd. & P.Syd. (1917)
- Eremothecella cyaneoides Lücking (2001)
- Eremothecella helicella Aptroot & M.Cáceres (2014)
- Eremothecella macrocephala (R.Sant.) G.Thor, Sérus., Lücking & Tat.Matsumoto (2000)
- Eremothecella microcephalica Sipman (2008)
- Eremothecella nicobarica Jagad.Ram & G.P.Sinha (2019)
