= Amazonomyces =

Scientific classification
- Domain: Eukaryota
- Kingdom: Fungi
- Division: Ascomycota
- Class: Arthoniomycetes
- Order: Arthoniales
- Family: Arthoniaceae
- Genus: Amazonomyces; Bat. (1964)

Type species
- Amazonomyces palmae Bat. & Cavalc. (1964)

Genus of fungi

Amazonomyces is a lichenized genus of fungi in the family Arthoniaceae. The genus contains 3 species:

- Amazonomyces farkasiae (Lücking) Lücking, Sérus. & G. Thor, 1998
- Amazonomyces palmae Bat. & Cavalc., 1963
- Amazonomyces sprucei (R. Sant.) Lücking, Sérus. & G. Thor, 1998
