= Myriostigma =

Scientific classification
- Domain: Eukaryota
- Kingdom: Fungi
- Division: Ascomycota
- Class: Arthoniomycetes
- Order: Arthoniales
- Family: Arthoniaceae
- Genus: Myriostigma; Kremp. (1874)

Type species
- Myriostigma candidum Kremp. (1874)

Genus of lichens

Myriostigma is a genus of lichens in the family Arthoniaceae. The genus was circumscribed by German lichenologist August von Krempelhuber in 1874.

Characteristics of Myriostigma include the raised maculate (spots), ascomata-like fertile areas, asci that are 8-spored, thick-walled, globular and stalked, and ascospores that are hyaline, bean-shaped, and muriform (divided into chambers by septa).

== Species ==
As of July 2024, Species Fungorum (in the Catalogue of Life) accepts nine species of Myriostigma.

- Myriostigma candidum Kremp. (1874)
- Myriostigma filicinum (Ellis & Everh.) Frisch & G.Thor (2014)
- Myriostigma irregulare (Lücking, Aptroot, Kalb & Elix) Frisch & G.Thor (2014)
- Myriostigma miniatum (Vain. ex Lücking) Aptroot, Ertz, Grube & M.Cáceres (2015)
- Myriostigma minisorediatum Aptroot, L.A.Santos & M.Cáceres (2024) – Brazil
- Myriostigma napoense (Kalb & Jonitz) Kukwa (2015)
- Myriostigma nicobaricum Jagadeesh & G.P.Sinha (2016) – India
- Myriostigma subcandidum (M.Cáceres & Lücking) Frisch & G.Thor (2014)
- Myriostigma xanthominiatum Aptroot & M.F.Souza (2021) – Brazil
- Myriostigma xanthonicum Aptroot & M.Cáceres (2018) – Brazil

The species once known as Myriostigma guatteriae G.Arnaud (1925) is now Myriostigmella guatteriae.
