= Eremothecella cyaneoides =

Scientific classification
- Domain: Eukaryota
- Kingdom: Fungi
- Division: Ascomycota
- Class: Arthoniomycetes
- Order: Arthoniales
- Family: Arthoniaceae
- Genus: Eremothecella
- Species: E. cyaneoides

Binomial name
- Eremothecella cyaneoides Lücking (2001)

Species of lichen

Eremothecella cyaneoides is a species of foliicolous (leaf-dwelling) lichen in the family Arthoniaceae. Identified as a new species in 2001, it is a distinct species of leaf-dwelling lichen found in Queensland, Australia. This species is marked by its continuous or marginally dispersed, smooth, whitish-grey thallus. It hosts a phycobiont of the genus Phycopeltis, characterised by rectangular cells arranged in radiate rows.

== Taxonomy ==
Eremothecella cyaneoides bridges the gap between the species Arthonia cyanea and Eremothecella macrocephala, displaying intermediate characteristics such as pruinose, bluish apothecia (fruiting bodies) and filiform (threadlike) conidia. The species differs from Arthonia cyanea in its larger ascospores and from Eremothecella macrocephala in having smaller, less septate ascospores and a non-enlarged proximal cell. This species highlights the close connection between Eremothecella and foliicolous Arthonia species, raising questions about the distinctiveness of the genus Eremothecella. Despite limited material, the formal description of Eremothecella cyaneoides was deemed necessary due to its systematic implications.

== Description ==
The thallus of Eremothecella cyaneoides is epiphyllous, appearing either continuous across the leaf surface or marginally dispersed, with a smooth texture and whitish-grey colour. Its apothecia (fruiting bodies) are adnate (closely attached), rounded or slightly irregular, measuring 0.7–1.2 mm in diameter, and feature a distinctive dark bluish-grey disc, often with a thick whitish pruina. The hypothecium is pale yellowish-brown, and the hymenium is colourless, with an epithecium of horizontal hyphae in pale yellowish to greyish brown.

Paraphyses within the hymenium are branched and anastomosing, leading to broadly ovoid to roughly spherical asci. Ascospores are broadly clavate, 3–5-septate, colourless, and measure 25–35 by 8–10 μm. Pycnidia are applanate (horizontally flattened), greyish black, and similar in anatomy to Eremothecella macrocephala, while conidia are filiform (threadlike) and mostly broken into 1–3-septate pieces.
