= Stirtonia (lichen) =

Scientific classification
- Kingdom: Fungi
- Division: Ascomycota
- Class: Arthoniomycetes
- Order: Arthoniales
- Family: Arthoniaceae
- Genus: Stirtonia; A.L.Sm. (1926)

Type species
- Stirtonia obvallata A.L.Sm. (1926)

Genus of lichen-forming fungi

Stirtonia is a genus of lichen-forming fungi in the family Arthoniaceae. It contains 22 species of corticolous (bark-dwelling) crustose lichens found primarily in tropical regions.

== Taxonomy ==
The genus was circumscribed by the British lichenologist Annie Lorrain Smith in 1926, with Stirtonia obvallata assigned as the type species. The species epithet honours the Scottish lichenologist James Stirton.

== Description ==
The thallus of Stirtonia contains trentepohlioid green algae as its photobiont partner. These algae belong to the genus Trentepohlia and are responsible for photosynthesis within the lichen symbiosis. Stirtonia lichens reproduce sexually through spore-producing structures called asci. These asci are found in specialised areas of the thallus known as ascigerous areas. A distinctive feature of Stirtonia is the presence of interascal hyphae (fungal threads between the asci) that anastomose, or interconnect, forming a network. These hyphae are similar in appearance to the hyphae found in non-reproductive parts of the thallus and are not bound together by a jelly-like substance (hymenial gel) as seen in some other lichen genera.

The ascospores of Stirtonia have a unique structure. They are divided only by transverse septa (cross-walls), creating several segments along the length of the spore. The walls of these spores, including the septa, are thickened. This thickening results in the internal chambers (lumina) of the spores having a rounded or lens-like shape when viewed under a microscope.

== Species ==
As of February 2025, Species Fungorum (in the Catalogue of Life) accepts 22 species of Stirtonia.

- Stirtonia borinquensis Perlmutter, Rivas Plata & Lücking (2018)
- Stirtonia byssoidea Seavey & J.Seavey (2015) – Florida
- Stirtonia caribaea Perlmutter, Rivas Plata & Lücking (2018)
- Stirtonia coei Seavey & J.Seavey (2015) – Florida
- Stirtonia curvata Aptroot (2009)
- Stirtonia divaricatica Seavey & J.Seavey (2017) – Florida
- Stirtonia epiphylla Aptroot & Seaward (2017) – Seychelles
- Stirtonia ghattensis S.N.Dudani, Nayaka, Ingle & S.Joseph (2018) – India
- Stirtonia ibirapuitensis Aptroot, Käffer & S.M.Martins (2014)
- Stirtonia isidiata Weerakoon & Aptroot (2016)
- Stirtonia juaensis T.E.F.Silva & N.S.Vitória (2023)
- Stirtonia latispora Seavey & J.Seavey (2015) – Florida
- Stirtonia lucida M.M.E.Alves, Aptroot & M.Cáceres (2014) – Brazil
- Stirtonia microspora Xavier-Leite, M.Cáceres & Aptroot (2014)
- Stirtonia neotropica Aptroot (2009)
- Stirtonia nitida Xavier-Leite, M.Cáceres & Aptroot (2014)
- Stirtonia nivea Xavier-Leite, M.Cáceres & Aptroot (2014)
- Stirtonia obvallata (Stirt.) A.L.Sm. (1926)
- Stirtonia ochracea M.M.E.Alves, Aptroot & M.Cáceres (2014) – Brazil
- Stirtonia psoromica Aptroot & Wolseley (2009)
- Stirtonia punctiformis Aptroot & Sipman (2014)
- Stirtonia rhizophorae Kalb & Mongk. (2012)
- Stirtonia schummii Aptroot (2009)
- Stirtonia viridis Aptroot, L.I.Ferraro, Sipman & M.Cáceres (2014)
