= Tylophoron hibernicum =

Scientific classification
- Kingdom: Fungi
- Division: Ascomycota
- Class: Arthoniomycetes
- Order: Arthoniales
- Family: Arthoniaceae
- Genus: Tylophoron
- Species: T. hibernicum

Binomial name
- Tylophoron hibernicum (D.Hawksw., Coppins & P.James) Ertz, Diederich, Bungartz & Tibell (2011)

Synonyms
- Blarneya hibernica D.Hawksw., Coppins & P.James (1980)

Species of lichen-forming fungus

Tylophoron hibernicum is a species of crustose lichen in the family Arthoniaceae. The species forms a thin, pale greyish-white crust dotted with small, rounded sporodochia that produce asexual spores. Originally described in 1979 as Blarneya hibernica based on Irish specimens, it was transferred to Tylophoron in 2011 following molecular and morphological studies that demonstrated Blarneya was nested within that genus. This bark-dwelling lichen grows on trees in humid forests and has a scattered pantropical to warm-temperate distribution, with confirmed records from Ireland, the Pyrenees, the Galápagos Islands, Hawaii, and tropical Africa. In North America, the species was long reported as Tylophoron protrudens, but re-examination of the type material of T. protrudens supported restricting that name to material without sporodochia; as a result, North American reports under that name are referable to T. hibernicum.

== Taxonomy ==
Tylophoron hibernicum was originally described in 1979 as Blarneya hibernica, based on a bark-dwelling lichen with conspicuous, pale sporodochia (small asexual spore-producing cushions). Later work combining microscopy, chemistry, ecology, and DNA sequencing showed that Blarneya is nested within Tylophoron. In particular, typical Tylophoron fruiting bodies were found developing directly on sporodochial thalli, and sequences obtained from the sporodochia grouped with Tylophoron rather than forming a separate lineage. On that basis, Blarneya hibernica was transferred to Tylophoron as Tylophoron hibernicum.

In the Galápagos Islands, the authors found that bark-dwelling collections grouped with other corticolous material (for example from Hawaii and the Pyrenees), while similar rock-dwelling specimens formed a different cluster. They therefore restricted the name T. hibernicum to the corticolous species, and treated the saxicolous Galápagos material as separate species.

In North America, the species was historically treated under the name Tylophoron protrudens. Later authors re-examined the application of that name by checking the type material of T. protrudens; the small pale structures on the holotype were interpreted as immature apothecia rather than sporodochia. On that basis, North American material with sporodochia is best referred to T. hibernicum.

== Description ==
Tylophoron hibernicum forms a thin, felty crust on bark. The thallus is pale grayish white (sometimes bluish white and only rarely creamy), lacks a true cortex, and is usually no more than about 0.3 mm thick. It produces many rounded sporodochia about 0.4–1 mm across; these are typically white to cream, and may have a faint pinkish or orange tint when fresh, often fading to white in herbarium material. The photosynthetic partner (photobiont) is the filamentous green alga Trentepohlia. A brown, cottony margin (prothallus) may be present and can be several millimeters wide.

The sporodochia produce hyaline conidia (asexual spores) that are either nonseptate or one-septate; one-septate conidia are often pinched at the septum. Sexual fruiting bodies are uncommon, but when present they are small, sessile, and topped by a well-developed black mazaedium (a powdery spore mass typical of calicioid lichens). The ascospores are dark brown, one-septate, and have a darker band around the middle. Pycnidia have been reported rarely, producing slender, thread-like pycnoconidia. Standard chemical spot tests show a weak C+ (red) reaction on the thallus, with K− and KC+ (red). Under ultraviolet light the thallus is usually UV− but some specimens are UV+ (orange). Thin-layer chromatography detected lecanoric acid in all examined specimens, with lichexanthone in some collections; earlier reports of schizopeltic acid were interpreted as likely contamination from the host lichen in mixed material. In southeastern North America, apothecia are seldom seen, and collections are typically recognized by the Trentepohlia photobiont, pale sporodochia with fragile conidia, and the presence of lecanoric acid.

== Habitat and distribution ==
Tylophoron hibernicum is corticolous, growing on the bark of trees in humid forests. The type material was collected in Ireland on a lichen growing in a sheltered recess on an old oak, and subsequent specimens have been documented from several widely separated regions. Confirmed collections include the western Pyrenees (France and Spain), the Galápagos (on multiple islands, mostly in humid highland settings but sometimes in transition or dry-zone sites), Hawaii, southern Florida, and tropical Africa (Democratic Republic of the Congo). Recorded substrates include a range of tree hosts, from oaks in Europe to various native or introduced trees in tropical localities. In 2017, it was recorded for the first time in Russia, from material collected in the northwestern Caucasus from the Krasnodar region.
