= Naevia (fungus) =

Scientific classification
- Kingdom: Fungi
- Division: Ascomycota
- Class: Arthoniomycetes
- Order: Arthoniales
- Family: Arthoniaceae
- Genus: Naevia; Fr. (1824)

Type species
- Naevia orbicularis Fr. (1824)

Species
- N. dispersa N. pinastri N. punctiformis

Synonyms
- Mycarthonia Reinke (1895); Pseudoarthonia Marchand (1896); Xerodiscus Petr. (1943)

Genus of fungi

Naevia is a small genus of fungi in the family Arthoniaceae. Unlike most members of their family, these fungi do not form lichens because they lack algal partners and instead obtain nutrients by decomposing dead bark material. They appear as tiny black dots scattered across the smooth bark of trees and shrubs, where they act as early colonisers of fresh bark surfaces. The genus was historically confused with the related lichen-forming genus Arthonia, but modern molecular phylogenetics studies have confirmed that Naevia represents a distinct evolutionary lineage of non-lichenised fungi.

== Taxonomy ==
Naevia is a small group of bark-inhabiting fungi within Arthoniales that do not form lichens (they lack a photosynthetic partner, or photobiont). The name was first introduced by Elias Fries in the 1820s for species resembling Arthonia but non-lichenised. Over the nineteenth and twentieth centuries, authors variously folded these fungi back into a broad Arthonia or scattered them among segregate genera such as Mycarthonia and Pseudoarthonia, and additional confusion arose because Fries later (1849) reused the name Naevia for an unrelated fungus, a homonym that was subsequently replaced by Naevala. This tangle left the true application of Naevia uncertain for more than a century.

A modern, multi-gene molecular phylogenetics study resolved the matter and formally resurrected Naevia for a distinct clade of non-lichenised, saprotrophic "Arthonia-like" species. Because N. orbicularis is conspecific with N. punctiformis, the type species of Naevia is N. punctiformis; on that basis Mycarthonia becomes a later (heterotypic) synonym. The study placed three species in Naevia with molecular support—N. punctiformis, N. dispersa, and N. pinastri—and noted that several additional names traditionally allied to Arthonia likely belong here but need sequence data to confirm.

== Description ==
Naevia species are minute bark-dwelling fungi that appear to the naked eye as tiny black dots scattered on smooth bark. Under the microscope, each dot is a fruiting body (an ascoma) built on the Arthonia-type plan: the tissue holding the spores (the hymenium) is colourless, and its gel turns blue with iodine stains (amyloid reaction: I+ blue, KI+ blue), while the upper surface layer (the epithecium) is olive-brown and shifts olive-green with potassium hydroxide solution; the tissue beneath (hypothecium) is pale to colourless. The spore sacs (asci) are the bitunicate/fissitunicate kind typical of this order—two-layered sacs that open by splitting—usually without a stalk, bearing 4–8 ascospores. The spores themselves are colourless and divided by 1–5 internal walls (septa). An asexual stage is also present: small black pycnidia (asexual fruiting bodies) embedded in the bark produce simple, rod-shaped conidia.

In overall build, Naevia closely resembles Arthonia in the strict sense, and the two are close relatives. Both share the same general fruit-body structure (including the olive-brown epithecium) and a distinctive iodine-positive ring within the ascus "cap" (the tholus). The consistent difference seen so far is chemical: in Naevia the hymenial gel is amyloid (stays blue with iodine), whereas in Arthonia it is typically hemiamyloid (bluing but then shifting reddish with iodine reagents). Just as important, Naevia lacks a photobiont so the thallus is not a lichen, but a saprotroph living on dead bark tissues. In the field, Naevia may create thallus-like, whitish to greyish patches on the bark surface; this appears to be an effect of the fungus disrupting the host's outer skin (epidermis/cuticle) rather than a true lichen thallus with an algal partner.

Within the genus, species differ mainly in the size and septation of their spores and the outline of the fruiting bodies. For example, N. punctiformis typically has larger, 3(–5)-septate spores and fruiting bodies that can be irregular to almost star-shaped; other species tend to have smaller, regularly 1- or 3-septate spores and more rounded fruiting bodies. No lichen substances have been detected in the genus by thin-layer chromatography.

== Ecology ==
Naevia species are saprotrophic on twigs and smooth bark, often as an early coloniser; it may derive nutrition from cuticular waxes on the bark surface.

== Species ==
- Naevia dispersa (Schrad.) V.Thiyag., Lücking & K.D.Hyde (2020)
- Naevia pinastri (Anzi) V.Thiyag., Lücking & K.D.Hyde (2020)
- Naevia punctiformis (Ach.) A.Massal. (1855)
