= Staurospora =

Scientific classification
- Kingdom: Fungi
- Division: Ascomycota
- Class: Arthoniomycetes
- Order: Arthoniales
- Family: Arthoniaceae
- Genus: Staurospora; Grube (2018)
- Species: S. purpurissata

Binomial name
- Staurospora purpurissata (Nyl.) Grube (2018)

Synonyms
- Arthonia purpurissata Nyl. (1863)

Single-species lichen genus

Staurospora purpurissata is a fungal genus in the family Arthoniaceae. This monotypic genus contains the single species Staurospora purpurissata, a corticolous (bark-dwelling), crustose lichen. It is distinguished from other genera in the family by its unique spherical ascospores. The genus was circumscribed in 2018 by the Austrian lichenologist Martin Grube. The type species was originally described by William Nylander in 1863, who placed it in the genus Arthonia. In his original characterisation of the species, Nylander described it as having a thallus that is either white or pale and very thin, either matte and undefined or bordered by a blackish prothallus line. The apothecia (fruiting bodies) are dark brown to black, oblong and irregularly shaped, flat, and of medium size (width approximately 0.5 millimeters), barely protruding, sometimes showing a hint of redness or having a purple-tinged upper margin, with the inside being darkly scarlet or somewhat red-tinged. This species typically grows on tree bark and the type specimen was collected at an elevation of 2,500 m (8,200 ft). Nylander emphasized its paradoxical nature within the genus, especially due to its unique colouration and habitat, differentiating it significantly from related species and assigning it to a distinct section of the genus characterised by variably coloured, non-black apothecia.
