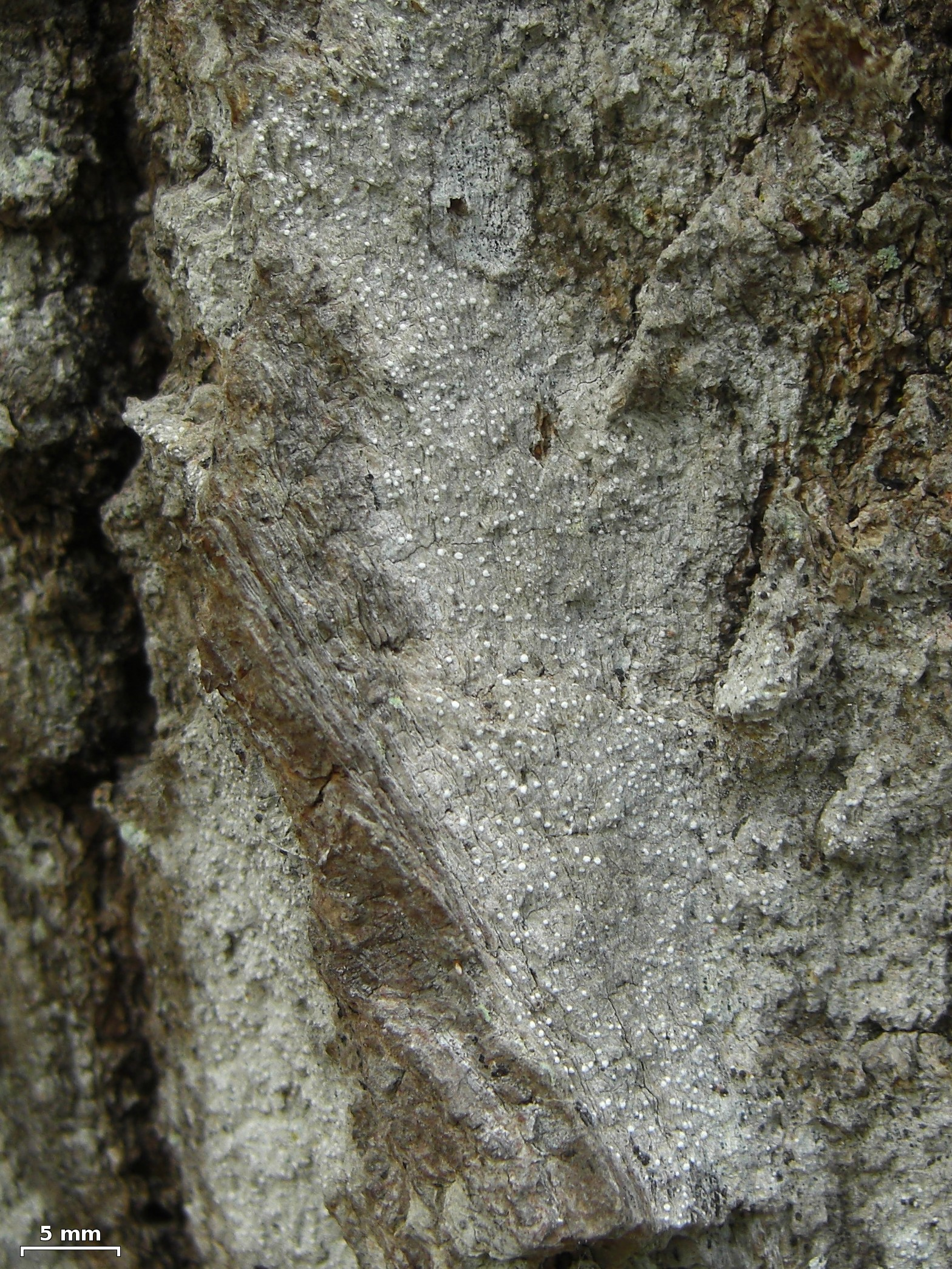

Conservation status
- Endangered (IUCN 3.1)

Scientific classification
- Kingdom: Fungi
- Division: Ascomycota
- Class: Arthoniomycetes
- Order: Arthoniales
- Family: Arthoniaceae
- Genus: Sporodophoron
- Species: S. americanum

Binomial name
- Sporodophoron americanum (Lendemer, E.A.Tripp & R.C.Harris) Ertz & Frisch (2015)

Synonyms
- Tylophoron americanum Lendemer, E.A.Tripp & R.C.Harris (2013)

= Sporodophoron americanum =

Species of lichen

Sporodophoron americanum is a rare species of corticolous (bark-dwelling), crustose lichen in the family Arthoniaceae. Found in northeastern North America, it was formally described as a new species in 2013 by the lichenologists James Lendemer, Erin Tripp, and Richard C.Harris. Damien Ertz and Andreas Frisch transferred it to Sporodophoron in 2015. The main morphological characteristics of the lichen include its blue-grey thallus, Trentepohlia algal photobiont partner, and white sporodochia. It has been assessed as an endangered species for the IUCN Red List.

== Habitat and distribution ==
Sporodophoron americanum is endemic to eastern North America, with its primary range concentrated in the southern Appalachian Mountains. The lichen is particularly abundant in eastern Tennessee, specifically in the Great Smoky Mountains and Unicoi Mountains within Blount, Monroe, and Sevier Counties. Additional populations are scattered throughout the Ozarks and Piedmont regions of the southeastern United States, with disjunct occurrences in Minnesota and a single known site in Ontario, Canada.

This lichen species predominantly inhabits temperate hardwood forests, showing a strong preference for riparian areas. It is most commonly found growing on the bark of hardwood trees, with a particular affinity for mature chestnut oak (Quercus montana). The lichen typically colonizes the grooves and crevices formed on the trunks of these trees. In rarer instances, S. americanum can be observed on non-calcareous rock overhangs in high-humidity environments, often associated with talus slopes or water bodies. All of the northern disjunct populations are exclusively found on such rock overhangs near water sources. While less common, the lichen occasionally occurs in boreal forests and rocky areas as well.

== Threats and conservation ==
Sporodophoron americanum faces an array of threats that endanger its survival. This rare lichen, found primarily in isolated pockets of mature forests in eastern North America, has experienced significant historical decline due to widespread logging and land-use changes. It continues to struggle against ongoing habitat fragmentation, air pollution, and the intensifying impacts of climate change. The species' highly specific habitat requirements, coupled with typically small population sizes at known sites, make it particularly vulnerable. Increasing temperatures, altered precipitation patterns, and more frequent extreme weather events further compromise its limited habitats. Human development, invasive species, and the risk of natural disasters such as fires and floods pose additional challenges. Despite some populations occurring in protected areas, these are often isolated, leaving S. americanum with little resilience against these cumulative threats and at considerable risk of extinction. Because of the pressures on its localized populations, increasingly fragmented habitat, and the lack of any planned protection actions, it was assessed as an endangered species for the IUCN Red List in 2021.
