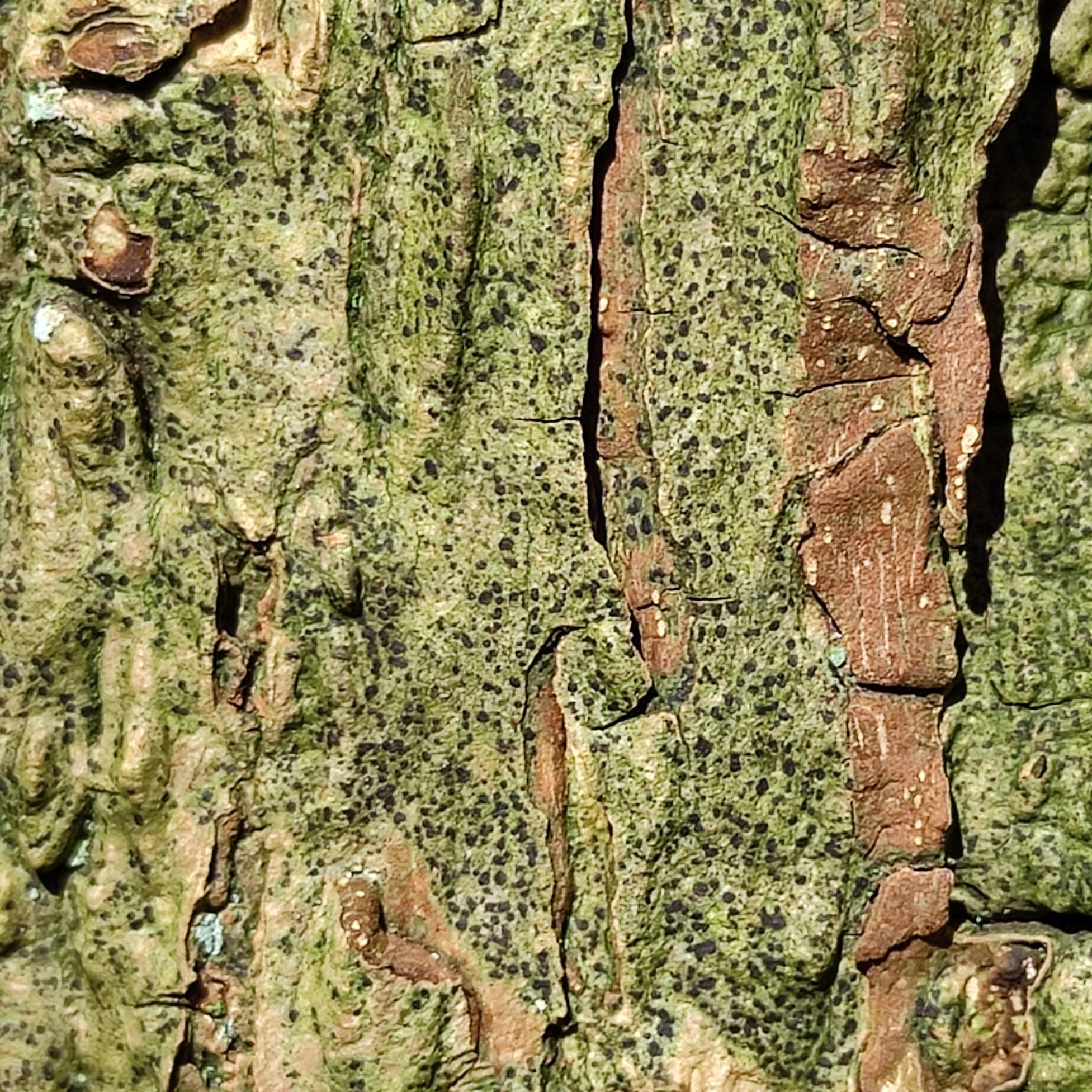

Scientific classification
- Domain: Eukaryota
- Kingdom: Fungi
- Division: Ascomycota
- Class: Lecanoromycetes
- Order: Graphidales
- Family: Graphidaceae
- Genus: Diarthonis; Clem. (1909)
- Species: D. spadicea

Binomial name
- Diarthonis spadicea (Leight.) Frisch, Ertz, Coppins & P.F.Cannon 2020

Synonyms
- Arthonia spadicea Leight. (1854); Arthonia lurida var. spadicea (Leight.) Nyl. (1856); Coniangium spadiceum (Leight.) Arnold (1873); Coniocarpon spadiceum (Leight.) Arnold (1873); Opegrapha spadicea (Leight.) M.Choisy (1950)

= Diarthonis =

Genus of lichens

Diarthonis is a fungal genus in the family Graphidaceae. Originally created in 1909 but long unused, the genus was revived in 2020 to accommodate D. spadicea when molecular studies showed this species fell outside the main Arthonia clade. The species grows as a thin, greyish to greenish crust beneath tree bark, producing small black disc-like reproductive structures (apothecia) that resemble drops of tar. It is considered an indicator of ecological continuity in old-growth broadleaved forests, particularly those dominated by English oak, and is listed as near-threatened in some regions.

== Taxonomy ==
The genus Diarthonis was established by Frederic Clements in 1909, with a minimal but nomenclaturally valid diagnosis. The type species, D. lurida (a rejected name), was based on Arthonia lurida Ach. (1803). After its establishment, the genus name remained essentially unused for over a century.

In 1981, D. lurida was formally rejected following a nomenclatural proposal by David Hawksworth and Martha Sherwood to protect the later name Arthonia spadicea Leight. (1854). The genus name Diarthonis itself remained available for use despite its type species being rejected. This became relevant when phylogenetic studies by Frisch and colleagues (2014) demonstrated that Arthonia spadicea fell outside the main Arthonia clade, forming a sister group with the Arthoniaceae along with Arthothelium norvegicum. This clade was later referred to as the "Coniangium clade" by Thiyagaraja and colleagues (2020), though this name was inappropriate as the type species of Coniangium (C. vulgare Fr., a synonym of Arthonia vinosa) belongs within the Arthoniaceae sensu stricto.

While the generic name Diarthonis was established using a rejected name (A. lurida) as its type, the nomenclatural rules permits the use of generic names in such cases. This allowed for the formal transfer of A. spadicea to Diarthonis as D. spadicea (Leight.) Frisch, Ertz, Coppins & P.F. Cannon in 2020. DNA analysis has suggested that Arthothelium norvegicum may also belong in Diarthonis, though further research is needed to confirm this relationship due to long phylogenetic branch lengths.

== Description ==
Diarthonis is characterised by its thin, greyish to grey-green body (thallus) that typically grows beneath the surface of tree bark, though occasionally appears on the surface. Its most distinctive features are the small, rounded reproductive structures (apothecia) that resemble drops of tar on the bark. These apothecia are reddish-brown to nearly black, often with a slight shine, and measure between 0.2 and 1.5 mm across.

When viewed under a microscope, the apothecia show a uniform orange-brown colour that turns dull purple when treated with potassium hydroxide solution (K). The spores produced in these structures are colourless, divided into two cells by a single wall (septum), and roughly slipper-shaped, measuring 7–11 by 3–4 μm.

The genus also produces smaller reproductive structures called pycnidia, which are brown with orange to reddish-brown walls that also turn pale purple with potassium hydroxide. These contain tiny, rod-shaped to narrowly elliptical spores (conidia). Chemical analysis has not detected any lichen products in the species.

== Habitat, distribution, and ecology ==
Diarthonis spadicea is considered an indicator species of good habitat quality and ecological continuity in broadleaved woodlands dominated by Quercus robur. Some authors consider it an old-growth indicator species. The species typically occurs in moist old forests that are well-lit but protected from direct sunlight. While it is often reported as being limited to the lowermost parts of tree boles or even roots, it has been found growing up to 2.5 metres high on trunks in some locations.

In Italy, D. spadicea is listed as a near-threatened species in the national Red List of lichens. In Lombardy, there was only a single historical record from the mid-19th century in the hills around Como until recent surveys discovered new populations. In contrast, D. spadicea was listed as a least-concern species in the first Red List of Latvian lichen in 2024.
