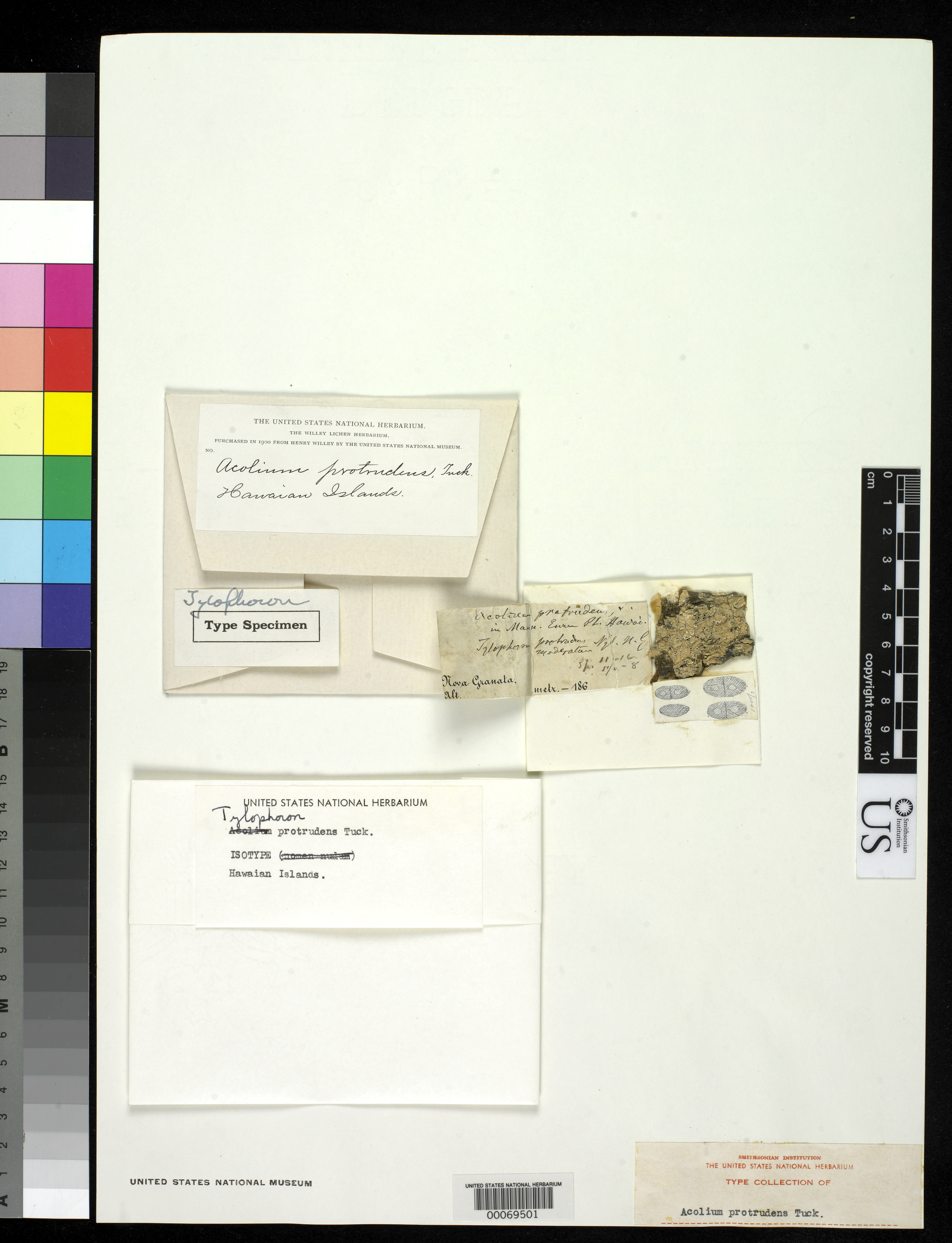
- Herbarium specimen of Tylophoron protrudens

Scientific classification
- Kingdom: Fungi
- Division: Ascomycota
- Class: Arthoniomycetes
- Order: Arthoniales
- Family: Arthoniaceae
- Genus: Tylophoron; Nyl. (1862)

Type species
- Tylophoron protrudens Nyl. (1862)

Species
- T. galapagoense T. gibsonii T. hibernicum T. moderatum T. protrudens T. rufescens T. stalactiticum

Synonyms
- Blarneya D.Hawksw., Coppins & P.James (1980); Ditylis Clem. (1909); Sporodochiolichen Aptroot & Sipman (2011)

= Tylophoron =

Genus of lichens

Tylophoron is a genus of lichen-forming fungi in the family Arthoniaceae. It comprises seven species of crustose lichens, most of which occur in tropical regions.

== Taxonomy ==
The genus was circumscribed in 1862 by the Finnish lichenologist William Nylander, with T. protrudens as the type species.

In 2013, Damien Ertz and colleagues showed through molecular analysis that the genus Sporodochiolichen, proposed by André Aptroot and Harrie Sipman in 2011, should be reduced to synonymy with Tylophoron. The type species of Sporodochiolichen (S. lecanoricus) was demonstrated to be conspecific with Tylophoron hibernicum, despite initial descriptions suggesting different photobiont partners. This taxonomic change left three additional species originally described in Sporodochiolichen (S. flavus, S. papillatus, and S. pigmentatus) requiring transfer to other genera, though their precise taxonomic placement remains uncertain. The remaining Sporodochiolichen species differ from Tylophoron in having golden yellow or pink sporodochia that produce simple or distoseptate conidia, compared to Tylophoron's typically pale or brown sporodochia with zero or one septate (non-distoseptate) conidia.

== Description ==
Tylophoron is a genus of crustose lichens that typically appear as thin, often powdery or slightly felt-like patches spread across their substrate. Although the thallus (lichen body) does not have a distinct outer skin (cortex), it may be coated with tiny crystals. Around the edges, a brown, radiating network of fungal strands (the prothallus) often forms a noticeable border. The lichen's photosynthetic partner is from Trentepohlia, a genus of green algae.

The reproductive structures (apothecia), when present, sit on the surface and range from short, cylindrical to cone-shaped. Most create a specialised spore mass called a mazaedium. A ring of lichen tissue (the thalline margin) surrounds the apothecia, often thickened at the base and dotted with minute crystals. Beneath this, the true exciple—made of dark brown, hardened fungal threads—provides structural support. The asci (spore-producing sacs) are cylindrical and hold their spores in a single row. As they mature, the asci dissolve, leaving a powdery black mass of spores (the mazaedium). The spores are thick-walled, dark brown, and divided into two cells by a single internal wall (septum).

Another form of reproduction involves sporodochia—small, rounded or dome-shaped structures that can range in colour from pale creamy yellow to black, appearing singly or in small clusters. These produce chains of spores (conidia) from terminal cells. The conidia themselves can be colourless or dark brown, generally without internal divisions, and shaped like elongated cylinders or tapered at the ends.

From a chemical standpoint, Tylophoron species can react in various ways with standard chemical spot tests. The main body (thallus) is K− and may show a red colour change with chlorine (C+ red) or no reaction at all (C−). Some species glow bright yellow under ultraviolet light (UV+), while others do not (UV−). Common secondary metabolites in these lichens include lecanoric acid, and in some cases, 2'-O-methylperlatoic acid or lichexanthone.

== Distribution ==
Most Tylophoron species occur in tropical areas.

== Species ==
As of December 2024, Species Fungorum (in the Catalogue of Life) accept seven species of Tylophoron:

- Tylophoron galapagoense Bungartz, Ertz, Diederich & Tibell (2011)
- Tylophoron gibsonii Tibell (1987)
- Tylophoron hibernicum (D.Hawksw., Coppins & P.James) Ertz, Diederich, Bungartz & Tibell (2011)
- Tylophoron moderatum Nyl. (1862)
- Tylophoron protrudens Nyl. (1862)
- Tylophoron rufescens Aptroot (2022) – Brazil
- Tylophoron stalactiticum Ertz & Diederich (2011)

Species formerly placed in Tylophoron:

- Tylophoron americanum Lendemer, E.A.Tripp & R.C.Harris (2013) = Sporodophoron americanum
- Tylophoron hawaiense (Tuck.) H.Magn. (1944) = Nadvornikia hawaiensis
- Tylophoron indicum Kremp. (1875) = Pyrgillus indicus
- Tylophoron triloculare Müll.Arg. (1893) = Heterocyphelium leucampyx
