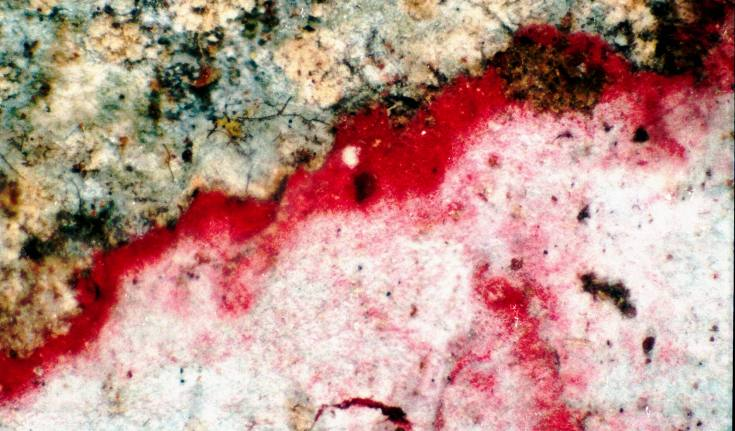
- Cryptothecia rubrocincta, member of the Arthoniaceae

Scientific classification
- Kingdom: Fungi
- Division: Ascomycota
- Class: Arthoniomycetes
- Order: Arthoniales
- Family: Arthoniaceae; Rchb. (1841)

Type genus
- Arthonia Ach. (1806)

= Arthoniaceae =

Family of fungi

The Arthoniaceae are a family of lichenized, lichenicolous and saprobic fungi in the order Arthoniales. The Arthoniaceae is the largest family of Arthoniales, with around 800 species. Most species in Arthoniaceae belong in Arthonia which is the largest genus with 500 species. The second and third largest genus is Arthothelium with 80 species, and Cryptothecia with 60 species.

== Taxonomy ==
The family was circumscribed by Heinrich Gottlieb Ludwig Reichenbach in 1841.

Arthonia is the type genus of Arthoniaceae, and it is known to be a polyphyletic and paraphyletic genus. The process of splitting Arthonia into monophyletic groups is an ongoing process. In order to make Arthonia monophyletic, several genera have been described or resurrected.

== Description ==
The family Arthoniaceae consists of lichens that are either lichenized or lichenicolous (living on other lichens), and sometimes lose their lichenized nature. The main body of these lichens, known as the thallus, is crustose, meaning it forms a crust-like appearance on the surface it inhabits. In lichen-forming species of Arthoniaceae, the primary photosynthetic partner (the photobiont), is usually a green alga from the genus Trentepohlia. Occasionally, they associate with other green algae, like Chrosonothrix.

The form of the reproductive structures (ascomata) varies widely within this family. They can be apothecioid (open and disc-like), lirellate (elongated and furrowed), or scattered. Some genera, like Tylophoron, have a unique type of ascomata called mazaediate. Typically, these structures lack distinct margins made of their own tissue (proper margin) or host tissue (thalline margin).

The internal structure of the ascomata, known as the hamathecium, consists of branched and interconnected filaments called paraphyses. In some genera, such as Cryptothecia and Stirtonia, the hamathecium lacks a gelatinous matrix, while in others, like Arthothelium, it is densely packed, resembling a different type of fungal reproductive structure known as ascolocular ascomata. These structures can react to iodine (amyloid reaction) in various ways: not at all (non-amyloid), partially (hemiamyloid), or fully (amyloid).

The asci, which are the spore-producing cells, are typically fissitunicate, meaning they have a double wall that splits during spore release. They come in various shapes, from club-shaped (clavate) to sac-like (saccate) or even spherical (globose), and contain a specialized cap structure (apical tholus) and an eye-like feature (ocular chamber). The asci may react to iodine in different ways: non-amyloid, hemiamyloid, or amyloid.

The spores produced by the asci, the ascospores, usually number eight per ascus but can sometimes be fewer, ranging from two to four or even one. These spores are segmented (transversely septate) or have multiple compartments (muriform), with shapes ranging from ellipsoid to clavate. Often, one end of the spore is larger (macrocephalic), or in muriform spores, there is a single large cell. The spores are typically transparent (hyaline) or brown and do not react to iodine.

Arthoniaceae also produce asexual spores in structures called pycnidia, and less commonly in campylidia. The conidia (asexual spores) can vary in shape from simple, non-segmented forms to those with transverse segments, and can be oblong, rod-like (bacillar), needle-like (acicular-filiform), or sickle-shaped (falcate), and are typically hyaline.

The family produces a diverse range of secondary metabolites (lichen products), including depsides, depsidones, anthraquinones, and derivatives of pulvinic acid. Some species also contain xanthones.

== Distribution ==
The species in Arthoniaceae have a worldwide distribution, but are especially prevalent in tropical areas with a Mediterranean climate. They are known from arctic to tropical latitudes, as well as variating altitudes from sea level to alpine regions, distributed in both humid forests and dry habitats.

== Ecology ==
Collectively, the family have a highly variable ecology with lichen-forming, lichenicolous and saprobic fungi. The majority of species are lichenized with a photobiont from Trentepohliaceae and a few species in Arthonia are lichenized with a photobiont from Chlorococcaleae. They grow on leaves, bark, bryophytes, and rocks. Other species are lichenicolous (growing on other lichens), and a few species, such as those in genus Naevia, are known to be saprobic.

== Genera ==
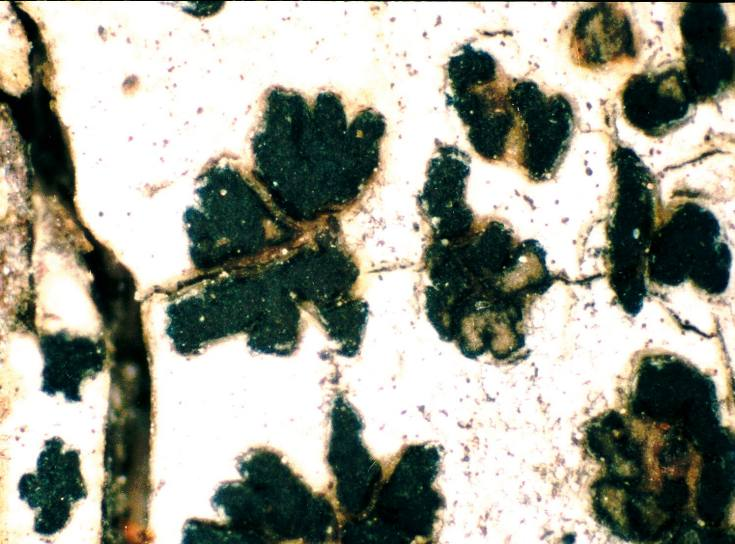
Herbarium specimen of Arthonia radiata (magnified 40x) showing roughly star-shaped clusters of ascomata. Found growing on the bark of red oak.

As of March 2021, Species Fungorum accepts 25 genera and 392 species in the family Arthoniaceae. This is a list of the genera in the Arthoniaceae based on a 2020 review and summary of fungal classification by Wijayawardene and colleagues. Following the genus name is the taxonomic authority (those who first circumscribed the genus; standardized author abbreviations are used), year of publication, and the number of species:

- Amazonomyces Bat. (1964) – 3 spp.
- Arthonia Ach. (1806) – ca. 50 + ca. 300 orphaned spp.
- Arthothelium A.Massal. (1852) – 10 + ca. 100 orphaned spp.
- Briancoppinsia Diederich, Ertz, Lawrey & van den Boom (2012) – 1 sp.
- Coniangium Fr. (1821) – 4 spp.
- Coniarthonia Grube (2001) – 12 spp.
- Coniocarpon DC. (1805) – 6 spp.
- Crypthonia Frisch & G.Thor (2010) – 16 spp.
- Cryptophaea Van den Broeck & Ertz (2016) – 1 spp.
- Cryptothecia Stirt. (1876) – ca. 65
- Diarthonis Clem. (1909) – 1 sp.
- Eremothecella Syd. & P.Syd. (1917) – 8 spp.
- Glomerulophoron Frisch, Ertz & G.Thor (2015) – 2 spp.
- Helicobolomyces Matzer (1995) – 2 spp.
- Herpothallon Tobler (1937) – ca. 50
- Inoderma (Ach.) Gray (1821) – 4 spp.
- Leprantha Dufour ex Körb. (1855) – 1 sp.
- Myriostigma Kremp. (1874) – 7 spp.
- Naevia Fr. (1824) – 3 spp.
- Pachnolepia A.Massal. (1855) – 2 spp.
- Reichlingia Diederich & Scheid. (1996) – 4 spp.
- Snippocia Ertz, Kukwa & Sanderson (2018) – 1 sp.
- Sporodophoron Frisch (2015) – 4 spp.
- Staurospora Grube (2018) – 1 sp.
- Stirtonia A.L.Sm. (1926) – ca. 25 spp.
- Tylophoron Nyl. (1862) – 11 spp.
