= Sclerococcum serusiauxii =

Scientific classification
- Kingdom: Fungi
- Division: Ascomycota
- Class: Eurotiomycetes
- Order: Sclerococcales
- Family: Dactylosporaceae
- Genus: Sclerococcum
- Species: S. serusiauxii

Binomial name
- Sclerococcum serusiauxii Boqueras & Diederich (1993)

Species of lichen

Sclerococcum serusiauxii is a species of lichenicolous fungus in the family Dactylosporaceae. It was described as a new species in 1993 by Montserrat Boqueras and Paul Diederich. The type was collected in Col de la Pierre St Martin (Spanish Pyrenees in Navarre), at an altitude of 1,550 m (5,090 ft). Here, the fungus was growing on the lichen Parmelina pastillifera, which itself was growing on Pinus uncinata. The specific epithet honours Belgian lichenologist Emmanuël Sérusiaux, who collected the type specimen in 1989. S. serusiauxii has also been recorded from Montenegro.

In addition to Parmelina pastillifer, it has also been recorded on Parmelina tiliacea. The fungus forms convex dark brown to black sporodochia that typically measure 60–180 by 60–100 μm. The mycelia of the fungus is embedded in the thallus of the host. The presence of the fungus does not cause damage to the host lichen.
