= Sclerococcum aptrootii =

Scientific classification
- Kingdom: Fungi
- Division: Ascomycota
- Class: Eurotiomycetes
- Order: Sclerococcales
- Family: Dactylosporaceae
- Genus: Sclerococcum
- Species: S. aptrootii

Binomial name
- Sclerococcum aptrootii Diederich (2015)

Species of fungus

Sclerococcum aptrootii is a species of lichenicolous fungus in the family Dactylosporaceae. Found in Puerto Rico, it was formally described as a new species in 2015 by the Luxemburger mycologist Paul Diederich. The type specimen was collected in Maricao State Forest north of Sabana Grande (Mayagüez), at an altitude of 800 m (2,600 ft); here, in a low mountain forest, it was found growing on the lichen Fissurina dumastii. It is only known to occur at the type locality. The fungus forms black, rounded sporodochia that measure 50–100 μm in diameter; it does not otherwise damage the host. The species epithet honours Dutch lichenologist André Aptroot, who collected the type in 1989.
