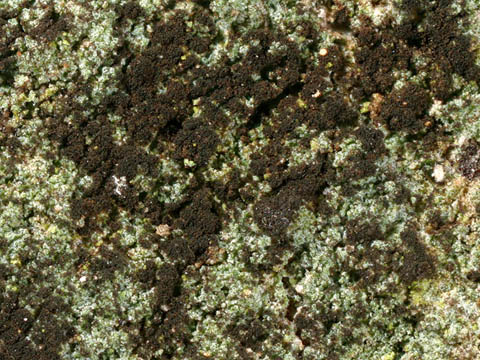

Scientific classification
- Kingdom: Fungi
- Division: Ascomycota
- Class: Arthoniomycetes
- Order: Arthoniales
- Family: Arthoniaceae
- Genus: Reichlingia
- Species: R. leopoldii

Binomial name
- Reichlingia leopoldii Diederich & Scheid. (1996)

= Reichlingia leopoldii =

Species of lichen-forming fungus

Reichlingia leopoldii is a species of lichen-forming fungus (a lichenised hyphomycete) in the family Arthoniaceae. It forms greyish-green patches up to several centimetres across on hard siliceous rocks such as basalt, often in sheltered overhangs and crevices. The fungus reproduces asexually through distinctive chocolate-brown, branched spores that develop on the thallus surface, and no sexual reproductive structures are known. In continental Europe the species is rare and scattered, occurring mainly on the bark of veteran oaks in long-established woodlands from the Netherlands and Belgium eastward to Poland, Lithuania and Russia. In Britain it is known only from a few rock localities in eastern Scotland, while elsewhere it has been recorded from primeval beech forests in the Carpathians.

== Taxonomy ==
Reichlingia leopoldii was described as new to science in 1996 by Paul Diederich and Christoph Scheidegger. The type specimen was collected by Volkmar Wirth in Epfendorf, Germany, where it was growing on the trunk of an old tree. The species epithet honours Léopold Reichling; the authors dedicated the name to him "on the occasion of his 75th birthday". The fungus was originally interpreted as a lichenicolous fungus growing on an unidentified host lichen with a trentepohlioid green algal photobiont. Subsequent work has treated it instead as a lichenised hyphomycete, that is, a lichen-forming fungus known only in its asexual conidial stage. Among lichenised and lichenicolous hyphomycetes that produce dark brown, warted (verrucose) conidia, R. leopoldii is characterised by its greyish green, often cottony thallus that is irregularly covered, except near the margin, with chocolate-brown, multicellular, branched conidia. Superficially similar species of the facultatively lichenised Milospium graphideorum have sharply delimited, roundish conidiomata and aseptate, irregularly lobed conidia with a swollen wall, while species of Sclerococcum (in the loose sense) likewise have discrete round conidiomata but conidia that are aseptate to multicellular and always more or less spherical. By the early 21st century it was regarded as one of a small group of lichen-forming hyphomycetes in which the thallus and the dark, powdery conidia always occur together, a view that is now widely adopted.

== Description ==
The thallus of Reichlingia leopoldii forms greyish green, more or less rounded patches. These are usually continuous and clearly delimited, though neighbouring patches may coalesce where they meet. Individual thalli are 0.5–2 mm thick and typically 1–5 cm in diameter, with exceptionally larger patches up to about 40 cm across; the margin is not, or only indistinctly, lobed. The thallus rests on a whitish prothallus of loose hyphae, best developed on the lower surface, which anchors it to the substrate. When visible, the lower surface is smooth, pale to ochraceous and rather even, resembling that of Lepraria crassissima.

In young and well-developed thalli the upper surface can appear finely granular. Coarse granules about 0.2–0.3 mm across soon break down into smaller soredia (30–60 μm) or composite consoredia (75–125 μm), giving the surface a powdery aspect with little or no projecting hyphae. In older thalli these soredia disintegrate or disappear, leaving a more or less byssoid (cottony) thallus with a very loose upper surface composed largely of free, whitish hyphae. The hyphae are colourless, 2–4 μm in diameter and often bear minute surface granules. The photobiont is trentepohlioid, consisting of yellowish, roundish or short-elongate algal cells, often joined in chains, that are densely enveloped by fungal hyphae.

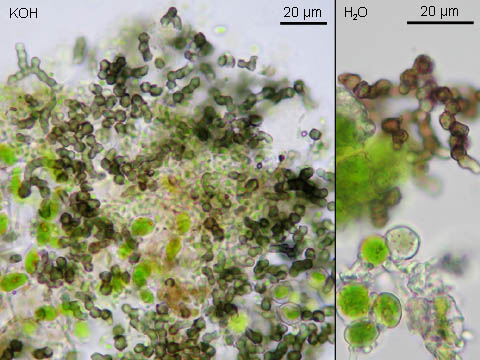
Thallus fragments with trentepohlioid photobiont cells and dark, verrucose, branched conidia of Reichlingia leopoldii; mounted in KOH (left) and water (right)

Sexual reproductive structures are unknown and ascomata have not been observed. Instead, the fungus reproduces asexually by conidia produced on the upper thallus surface, away from the margin, in irregular sporodochium-like conidiomata. These conidiomata are reddish to dark chocolate brown, irregular in outline, 0.1–0.4 mm in diameter and may coalesce into larger patches. They are composed of dark brown conidiophores with thick, warted walls; distinct conidiogenous cells are not apparent, and the terminal cells of the conidiophores act successively as conidiogenous cells. The conidia are dry, irregularly branched and septate, with one or several branches and conspicuous constrictions at the septa. They are 17–35 μm long overall; the individual cells are somewhat spherical to ellipsoidal, 4–6 μm long and 3.5–5.5 μm wide, with a strongly verrucose wall and dense dark brown pigmentation. In standard spot tests the thallus is K–, Pd– and UV–; C and KC give a sometimes indistinct reddish reaction. The main secondary metabolite detected is 2'-O-methylperlatolic acid.

== Habitat and distribution ==
Reichlingia leopoldii grows on hard siliceous rock, particularly basalt and conglomerate cliffs. It is often found on steep or overhanging faces, including relatively dry crevices in underhangs, where it may occur with other lichens such as Sparria endlicheri, Dirina massiliensis and Dendrographa latebrarum. In Britain it is currently known from eastern Scotland, with records from Angus, eastern Inverness-shire and East Lothian. Within Europe its known range is relatively small and it is rare even there, with scattered records from Luxembourg and Switzerland (including the type area), Germany (Baden-Württemberg, the Eifel and Lower Saxony), Poland, Lithuania, Austria, France (Brittany), Belgium, Great Britain and the Netherlands. In lowland sites the species is mostly on old oaks, whereas the British and some Belgian records are from rock faces.

In continental lowland Europe it is regarded as characteristic of long-established woodland and is largely confined to the bark near the bases of veteran oaks, where it often grows together with other rare epiphytic lichens on old trees. In the Netherlands it was first recorded in the forest reserve Lieftinghsbroek in Groningen, where a substantial population occurs on the foot of an old oak in a mixed deciduous forest interpreted as long-established woodland. In Russia, R. leopoldii was previously known only from the Caucasus, but fieldwork in 2019 showed that it also occurs in the northern part of the Kaliningrad region, although it is still regarded as rare in the country. It also occurs in the primeval beech forests of the Ukrainian Carpathians.
