= Sclerococcum toensbergii =

Scientific classification
- Kingdom: Fungi
- Division: Ascomycota
- Class: Eurotiomycetes
- Order: Sclerococcales
- Family: Dactylosporaceae
- Genus: Sclerococcum
- Species: S. toensbergii

Binomial name
- Sclerococcum toensbergii Diederich (2017)

Species of lichen

Sclerococcum toensbergii is a species of lichenicolous (lichen-dwelling) fungus in the family Sclerococcaceae. It is known from only a couple of collections made in the northwestern United States, and a collection in France. In the United States, it has been recorded on the bark-dwelling lichens Megalaria pulverea and Pertusaria carneopallida, while in France, it was found growing on Caloplaca cerina.

== Taxonomy ==
Sclerococcum toensbergii was scientifically described as a new species in 2017 by the Luxemburger mycologist Paul Diederich. The type specimen was collected in the United States, specifically in Cowlitz County, Washington. It was collected on August 8, 1996, by the Norwegian lichenologist Tor Tønsberg. The type locality is located 7–8 km (4.3–5.0 mi) southwest of the summit of Mount St. Helens, at an elevation of 900–1,000 m (3,000–3,300 ft). The lichen was found growing on the trunk of a red alder (Alnus rubra), specifically on Pertusaria carneopallida and accompanied by Phlyctis speirea. The species epithet honours Tønsberg, an "expert of corticolous, crustose lichens from the Northern Hemisphere".

== Description ==
Sclerococcum toensbergii forms superficial, slightly convex structures known as sporodochia, which are blackish and can be rounded, elongated, or irregular in shape. These sporodochia range from 100 to 300 μm in diameter and can sometimes merge, often becoming poorly defined as mature conidia (asexual spores) spread around the conidiogenous (spore-producing) area. The vegetative hyphae of this fungus are pale to medium brown and are embedded within the host lichen's thallus, measuring 2 to 5 μm in diameter. The conidiophores, which are the spore-bearing structures, are grouped into dense sporodochia. They are sparsely branched, pale to medium brown, and 2 to 3.5 μm thick.

The conidiogenous cells, where the conidia are produced, can be monoblastic (producing a single spore) or polyblastic (producing multiple spores). These cells are terminal (at the end of the conidiophores), integrated, brown, and range in shape from somewhat spherical to ellipsoid or elongated, making them hard to distinguish from other conidiophore cells. The conidia are produced singly and are rarely seen in chains. They are dry, roughly spherical or ellipsoid, medium to dark brown, and muriform (divided into multiple cells), typically having 6 to 15 cells visible under a microscope. The conidia measure 12.5 to 23.0 μm in length and 7.7 to 17.5 μm in width, with a length-to-width ratio (Q) of 1.0 to 1.9. These conidia often spread around the sporodochia on the host thallus. Each conidial cell is subspherical to ellipsoid, measuring 3.5 to 6 μm in diameter, with septa (dividing walls) that are 0.5 to 1 μm thick and dark brown. The conidial walls are dark brown, 0.5 to 1 μm thick, smooth, or rarely rough.

== Habitat, distribution, and ecology ==
At the time of its original publication, Sclerococcum toensbergii was known from two locations in Washington, USA. It was found growing on the bark-dwelling lichens Megalaria pulverea and Pertusaria carneopallida. These host lichens are asymptomatic of fungal infection, and do not show visible signs of damage. The Pertusaria carneopallida thallus observed, however, had fewer apothecia (fruiting bodies) than is typically seen in this species.

In 2021, the fungus was recorded from the southern Vosges, where it was found on Caloplaca cerina. This host grows at the base of Sorbus aucuparia (rowan) trees in areas characterized by Nardus grassland and dwarf shrub heathss with Vaccinium myrtillus (bilberry) and Calluna vulgaris (heather). This habitat is well-exposed to light and includes other lichens such as Lecidella elaeochroma and Rinodina malangica. The region experiences significant snowfall during the winter, which likely covers the whole community for extended periods. This locality is situated in the area with the highest precipitation levels in northeastern France. At an elevation of 1,150 m (3,770 ft), the annual precipitation reaches 1900 mm. This high humidity is possibly relevant to the occurrence of Sclerococcum toensbergii. Similarly, in its Washington habitats, such as Mount St. Helens and the Olympic Peninsula, the annual precipitation is even higher, reaching 2500 mm.
