= Sclerococcum hafellnerianum =

Scientific classification
- Kingdom: Fungi
- Division: Ascomycota
- Class: Eurotiomycetes
- Order: Sclerococcales
- Family: Dactylosporaceae
- Genus: Sclerococcum
- Species: S. hafellnerianum

Binomial name
- Sclerococcum hafellnerianum (Sérus.) Ertz & Diederich (2018)

Synonyms
- Dactylospora hafellneriana Sérus. (1984)

Species of lichen

Sclerococcum hafellnerianum is a species of lichenicolous (lichen-dwelling) fungus in the family Dactylosporaceae. It grows on the lichen Santessonia lagunebergii in coastal Namibia, forming tiny black, urn-shaped fruiting bodies about 0.1–0.2 millimetres across. The species was first described in 1984 from collections made in the Laguneberg Range of Namibia. Field surveys suggest the fungus is relatively uncommon, infecting only a small fraction of the host lichens examined.

== Taxonomy ==
The fungus was first described as a new species in 1984 by the Belgian lichenologist Emmanuël Sérusiaux, who classified it in the genus Dactylospora. The type material was collected in February 1983 in the southern Laguneberg Range of Namibia, about 2–3 km north of "Mile 72" on the road from Swakopmund towards Skeleton Coast National Park. It was found at roughly 150 m elevation on a granite hill, growing on the lichen Santessonia lagunebergii. The species name honours the German mycologist Josef Hafellner. The fungus was reclassified in 2018 by Damien Ertz and Paul Diederich, who transferred it to Sclerococcum.

== Description ==
Sclerococcum hafellnerianum forms minute black fruit bodies (apothecia) on the thallus of its host, Santessonia lagunebergii, most often near the bases of the host's branchlets and sometimes even on the host's own apothecia. The young fruit bodies begin half-embedded in the host but soon become clearly superficial. They are strongly constricted at the base and urn-shaped (urceolate), with a distinct, persistent margin that looks finely wrinkled at high magnification. Individual apothecia are usually about 0.1–0.2 mm across and up to 90 micrometres (μm) tall.

In section, the wall of the fruiting body (excipulum) is pseudoparenchymatous (composed of small, near-isodiametric cells arranged more or less radially) with outer cell walls dark brown, becoming paler inward and 10–15 μm thick. The spore-bearing layer (hymenium) is colourless and 40–60 μm high; the tissue beneath it (hypothecium) is brown to blackish and made of irregularly interwoven, almost parenchymatous cells. Paraphyses are simple and septate (with cross-walls), only sparsely branched, and have slightly swollen tips with brownish walls. Asci are club-shaped and show the typical Dactylospora-type reaction: a thick gelatinous cap that stains intensely blue with iodine (I+), while the inner ascus layers remain iodine-negative. Each ascus contains about 20–40 ascospores (usually around 30). The spores are ellipsoid, one-septate (with a single cross-wall), not pinched at the septum, brown, and measure 5–7 × 3–4 μm.

== Habitat and distribution ==
Sclerococcum hafellnerianum lives on the lichen Santessonia lagunebergii, growing directly on the host thallus and, at times, on the host's own apothecia. Infected areas are usually near the bases of the host's branchlets, where the parasite's tiny fruiting bodies first form half-embedded in the host and then become fully superficial. During the field survey that yielded the type collection, only a small fraction of the many Santessonia thalli examined showed infection, suggesting the fungus is uncommon where it occurs. The species is presently known from coastal Namibia in south-western Africa.
