= Sclerococcum sipmanii =

Scientific classification
- Kingdom: Fungi
- Division: Ascomycota
- Class: Eurotiomycetes
- Order: Sclerococcales
- Family: Dactylosporaceae
- Genus: Sclerococcum
- Species: S. sipmanii

Binomial name
- Sclerococcum sipmanii Diederich (2015)

Species of lichen

Sclerococcum sipmanii is a rare species of lichenicolous fungus in the family Dactylosporaceae. Found in Malaysia, it was formally described as a new species in 2015 by Luxembourgish mycologist Paul Diederich. The type specimen was found on the southern slope of Mount Kinabalu (Kota Belud, Sabah) at an altitude of 2,800 m (9,200 ft); here, in a mossy forest on a mountain ridge, it was found growing on the lichen Anomomorpha cf. roseola. The fungus forms black, convex, rounded sporodochia typically measuring 100–200 μm in diameter; the fungus does not otherwise cause visible damage to the host lichen. Sclerococcum sipmanii is only known to occur at the type locality. The species epithet honours Dutch lichenologist Harrie Sipman, one of the collectors of the type.
