= Parmelina cryptotiliacea =

Scientific classification
- Domain: Eukaryota
- Kingdom: Fungi
- Division: Ascomycota
- Class: Lecanoromycetes
- Order: Lecanorales
- Family: Parmeliaceae
- Genus: Parmelina
- Species: P. cryptotiliacea

Binomial name
- Parmelina cryptotiliacea A.Crespo & Núñez-Zapata (2011)

Species of lichen

Parmelina cryptotiliacea is a species of foliose lichen in the family Parmeliaceae. It was described as a new species in 2011 and is morphologically similar to Parmelina tiliacea, from which it was segregated based on genetic and subtle anatomical differences. It occurs in only a few locations in Spain, where it grows on tree trunks and on rocks in lowland areas.

== Taxonomy ==
Parmelina cryptotiliacea was described as a new species in 2011 by the lichenologists Ana Crespo and Jano Núñez-Zapata. The species was identified through a molecular phylogenetics study that revealed its genetic distinctiveness from Parmelina tiliacea, a widely distributed European species. The type specimen was collected in Parque Natural de Monfragüe, Spain, growing on the bark of Quercus ilex (holm oak) at an elevation of 207 metres. The specific epithet cryptotiliacea reflects its cryptic similarity to P. tiliacea.

== Description ==
Parmelina cryptotiliacea forms a foliose (leaf-like) thallus that is pale mineral grey to mineral grey. The lobes are irregularly branched, sublinear-elongate, and often overlap. Their margins are slightly wavy (undulate) and scalloped (crenate) but lack cilia. The upper surface is shiny and usually covered with a fine powdery coating (pruina), while the medulla is white. The lower surface is black with a brown edge and bears black, simple rhizines measuring 1–2 mm long.

The lichen reproduces vegetatively via small, cylindrical isidia, which measure 0.5–1.5 mm in length and darken at the tips. Apothecia, when present, are up to 4 mm in diameter. The spores are cylindrical, measuring 9–13 μm in length and 3–5 μm in width. The main secondary metabolites found in P. cryptotiliacea are atranorin and lecanoric acid.

== Habitat and distribution ==
This species is known only from Spain, where it has been recorded in four locations: Monfragüe National Park (Extremadura), El Pardo (Madrid), Puertollano, and San Quintín mine (Castilla–La Mancha). It grows on the trunks of trees such as Quercus ilex and Pistacia terebinthus, as well as on rocks, in lowland areas ranging from 250 to 700 metres above sea level. The species grows in environments with relatively low humidity and coexists with P. tiliacea at lower elevations.
