= Sclerococcum fissurinae =

Scientific classification
- Domain: Eukaryota
- Kingdom: Fungi
- Division: Ascomycota
- Class: Eurotiomycetes
- Order: Sclerococcales
- Family: Dactylosporaceae
- Genus: Sclerococcum
- Species: S. fissurinae

Binomial name
- Sclerococcum fissurinae Pérez-Ort. (2020)

Species of lichen

Sclerococcum fissurinae is a species of lichenicolous fungus in the family Dactylosporaceae. Found in Alaska, it was formally described as a new species in 2020 by Sergio Pérez-Ortega. The type specimen was collected in the Hoonah-Angoon Census Area, just outside of Glacier Bay National Park. Here it was found growing on the script lichen species Fissurina insidiosa, which itself was growing on the bark of an alder tree. The specific epithet refers to its host.

The fungus forms black, circular apothecia on its lichen host that are up to 0.6 mm in diameter. Its asci are eight-spored, measuring 25–33 by 8–12 μm. The ascospores are brown with an ellipsoid shape, and typical dimensions of 8–12 by 3–4 μm; they usually have three septa, although sometimes only one or two occur. A morphologically similar species in the same genus is S. parasiticum but in this fungus, which has a different host, the ascospores are slightly larger (9–15 by 3.5–5 μm).
