= Rhopalophora =

Rhopalophora is the genus name of:

- Rhopalophora (beetle), a genus of beetles in the family Cerambycidae.
- Rhopalophora (fungus), a lichen sac fungus in the order Eurotiomycetes.
