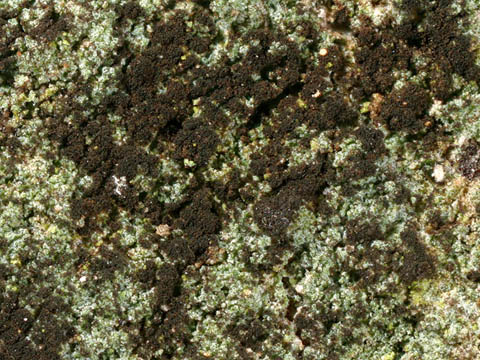
- Reichlingia leopoldii

Scientific classification
- Kingdom: Fungi
- Division: Ascomycota
- Class: Arthoniomycetes
- Order: Arthoniales
- Family: Arthoniaceae
- Genus: Reichlingia; Diederich & Scheid. (1996)

Type species
- Reichlingia leopoldii Diederich & Scheid. (1996)

Species
- R. americana R. anombrophila R. dendritica R. leopoldii R. syncesioides R. virginea R. zwackhii

= Reichlingia (lichen) =

Genus of lichens

Reichlingia is a genus of lichen-forming fungi in the family Arthoniaceae. It has seven species. The genus was originally circumscribed by Paul Diederich and Christoph Scheidegger in 1996, with Reichlingia leopoldii as the type, and at that time, only species. The fungus was at first thought to be a lichenicolous (lichen-dwelling) fungus, but is now considered a lichenised hyphomycete.

== Description ==
The thallus of Reichlingia lichens range in colour from white and pale grey to a greyish green. This main body of the lichen is usually compact, felt-like, and sometimes appears byssoid (resembling fine fibres) or granular in texture. Around the edges, a faint, whitish, hair-like prothallus may be visible, although when it encounters other lichens, a darker brown boundary line often forms.

The lichen's photosynthetic partner (photobiont) belongs to Trentepohlia, a genus of green algae. Its reproductive structures, the apothecia, vary in shape—from round and polygonal to short and slit-like (lirelliform)—and may form small, lobed clusters or irregular, star-like patterns. These structures lie either flush with the thallus or sit atop it, and they are often partly covered by a thin, whitish powder (pruina). The apothecia lack a clearly defined thalline margin, or if present, it is patchy and thin. Beneath the pruina, the tissue can be pale to mid-brown, and the supportive "true exciple" (the boundary around the apothecium) often narrows near the base. In some species, pale granular crystals are present within this exciple, while in others they are absent.

Just below the surface, the epithecium (the top layer of the spore-producing region) may appear greyish due to the presence of pale crystals, or it can be dark brown. This layer consists mainly of densely branched, interwoven, thread-like structures (paraphysoids) that are largely free at their tips. The main spore-bearing layer (the hymenium) is generally colourless, supported by a hypothecium that can range from colourless to slightly brownish. The paraphysoids themselves branch loosely and are connected in a gelatinous matrix, with their tips occasionally darkened by brown pigments. The asci (spore-producing cells) are club-shaped and resemble those found in the Arthonia group. They typically contain eight spores and do not show a strong blue reaction with iodine-based staining (KI+).

As the ascospores mature, they remain colourless or may turn pale brown. They are generally cylindrical or slightly egg-shaped, divided into three to five segments by internal walls, sometimes with larger end segments, or are partially subdivided into multiple small chambers (submuriform). The gelatinous matrix of the hymenium changes colour when tested with iodine solutions, typically turning deep blue or, less frequently, pale yellowish-brown to pale blue.

So far, no pycnidia (another type of spore-producing structure) have been observed in Reichlingia. However, the type species (R. leopoldii) forms sporodochia—reddish to dark chocolate-brown spore-producing patches that can merge into large, irregular areas. Within these, the conidiophores (specialised spore-producing filaments) are dark brown with thick, warty walls. The resulting conidia (asexual spores) are also dark brown, irregularly branched, and have a warty surface, often visibly pinched at their internal divisions.

== Species ==
- Reichlingia americana C.A.Morse & Ladd (2021)
- Reichlingia anombrophila (Coppins & P.James) Frisch (2020)
- Reichlingia dendritica (Leight.) Ertz & Sanderson (2020)
- Reichlingia leopoldii Diederich & Scheid. (1996)
- Reichlingia syncesioides Frisch & G.Thor (2013)
- Reichlingia virginea (Müll.Arg.) Frisch (2013)
- Reichlingia zwackhii (Sandst.) Frisch & G.Thor (2013)
