= Sclerococcum gelidarium =

Scientific classification
- Domain: Eukaryota
- Kingdom: Fungi
- Division: Ascomycota
- Class: Eurotiomycetes
- Order: Sclerococcales
- Family: Dactylosporaceae
- Genus: Sclerococcum
- Species: S. gelidarium

Binomial name
- Sclerococcum gelidarium Etayo & F.Berger 2000

Species of fungus

Sclerococcum gelidarium is a species of lichenicolous fungus belonging to the family Dactylosporaceae. It has only been reported from Iceland. It grows on the host lichen Placopsis gelida, from which the species derives its epithet.

== Description ==
Sclerococcum gelidarium forms distinctive dark brownish-black, round, slightly convex reproductive structures (called sporodochia) that measure about 250–300 micrometres (μm) in diameter. These structures develop on the surface of the host lichen. Each sporodochium consists of a pale-coloured base made up of densely packed cells arranged in a tissue-like pattern. From this base arise densely packed, unbranched, specialized fungal filaments (conidiophores) that are arranged in a palisade-like formation. These conidiophores measure about 50 μm in length and have grey to greyish-brown cells that appear swollen at the base. Only the cells at the tips of these conidiophores can produce spores.

The spores (conidia) of Sclerococcum gelidarium are produced individually (a process known as monoblastic conidiogenesis) and arranged in chains. Each spore contains 2–5 cells (described as "phragmospore", which means a spore with cross-walls dividing it into several cells) and has an irregularly elliptical to irregular shape, measuring 8–12.5 by 6.5–8 μm. Young spores appear bluish-grey and are covered with small scale-like structures (squamulae). As the spores mature, they become brown, thick-walled, and heavily encrusted with a dark brown gelatinous material. The fungus spreads through the body (thallus) of its host lichen via microscopic filaments (mycelium).

This species differs from the related Sclerococcum sphaerale by its bluish-grey to brown conidiophores and conidia, and by its spores that are encrusted with dark gelatinous scales.

== Habitat and distribution ==
Sclerococcum gelidarium is found growing parasymbiontically on the thallus (body) and cephalodia (specialized structures containing nitrogen-fixing cyanobacteria) of the lichen species Placopsis gelida. The species has a very limited known distribution, having been documented at only two locations in Iceland as of the time of is original description.
