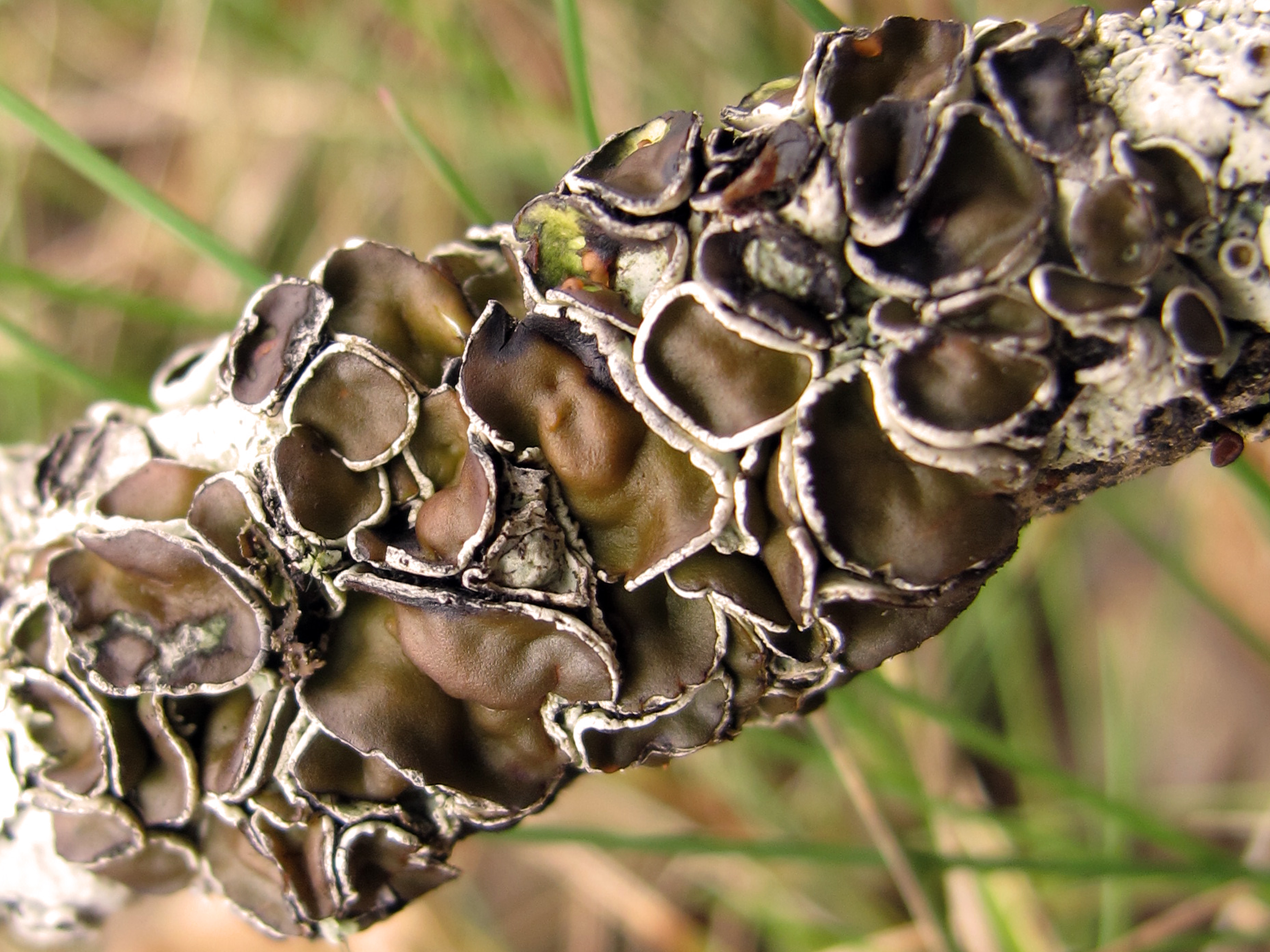

Scientific classification
- Domain: Eukaryota
- Kingdom: Fungi
- Division: Ascomycota
- Class: Lecanoromycetes
- Order: Lecanorales
- Family: Parmeliaceae
- Genus: Parmelina
- Species: P. quercina

Binomial name
- Parmelina quercina (Willd.) Hale (1974)

Synonyms
- Lichen quercinus Willd. (1787); Lobaria quercina (Willd.) P.Gaertn., B.Mey. & Scherb. (1802); Imbricaria quercina (Willd.) DC. (1805); Parmelia quercina (Willd.) Vain. (1899)

= Parmelina quercina =

Species of lichen

Parmelina quercina is a species of foliose lichen in the large family Parmeliaceae. It is found in continental Europe.

== Taxonomy ==
The lichen was first scientifically described by German botanist Carl Ludwig Willdenow in 1787, as Lichen quercinus. Finnish lichenologist Edvard August Vainio considered it better classified in Parmelia, which at the time was a large genus that contained most foliose, or so-called "parmelioid" lichens. Mason Hale transferred it (and 40 other former Parmelia species) to the newly circumscribed genus Parmelina in 1974.

In 2007, molecular phylogenetic analysis was used on specimens collected from around the world, which showed that the collection of specimens being called Parmelina quercina actually represented four distinct species. Not only were they genetically distinct, but they had distinctive morphological characteristics as well as unique geographic distributions. In addition to Parmelina carporrhizans (oceanic Europe and Macaronesia), and Parmelina quercina, now restricted to continental Europe, two new species were proposed: Parmelina coleae for North America, and Parmelina elixii for Australia. The latter species has since been transferred to Austroparmelina. Because Willdenow's original specimens of Parmelina quercina, collected from "im Thiergarten & prope Tegel" in Berlin, have been lost, a neotype from Germany was designated for the taxon in 2009.
