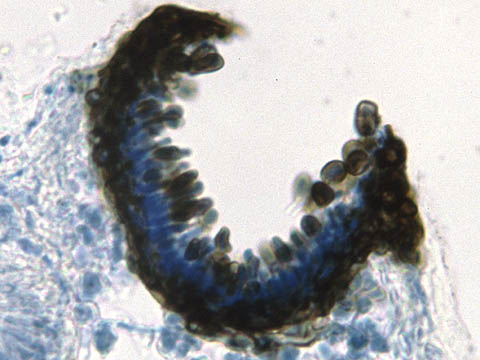
- Microscopic view of pycnidium with dark brown conidia

Scientific classification
- Kingdom: Fungi
- Division: Ascomycota
- Class: Dothideomycetes
- Order: Lichenoconiales
- Family: Lichenoconiaceae
- Genus: Lichenoconium
- Species: L. reichlingii

Binomial name
- Lichenoconium reichlingii Diederich (1986)

= Lichenoconium reichlingii =

Species of fungus

Lichenoconium reichlingii is a species of lichenicolous (lichen-dwelling) fungus in the family Lichenoconiaceae. The fungus causes distinctive symptoms on its host, beginning as black patches that develop into pale spots with sharp dark margins as the infection progresses. It is known from Luxembourg and surrounding areas of north-western Europe, where it inhabits the bark-dwelling lichen Ramalina fraxinea.

== Taxonomy ==
Lichenoconium reichlingii is a lichenicolous (lichen-dwelling) coelomycete that was described as new to science by Paul Diederich in 1986, in his survey of lichen-inhabiting fungi from the Grand Duchy of Luxembourg and neighbouring regions. The species was introduced in the genus Lichenoconium on the basis of material collected on the thallus of the fruticose lichen species Ramalina fraxinea growing on the bark of a Tilia tree between Brouch and Saeul in the Gutland region of Luxembourg; this collection serves as the holotype and is preserved in the herbarium at Liège (LG). Diederich distinguished L. reichlingii from other members of the genus chiefly by its comparatively large conidia. The specific epithet honours Léopold Reichling of Luxembourg (1921–2009) in recognition of his contributions to the study of the country's flora.

== Description ==
The fungus forms lichenicolous pycnidia that develop within the thallus of Ramalina fraxinea. These pycnidia are scattered to densely aggregated, at first immersed in the host but with their apices breaking through the surface. They are more or less spherical (subglobose), black, and very small (around 60–100 μm in diameter), with a rather irregular ostiole. The pycnidial wall is relatively thick, composed of several layers of pseudoparenchymatous cells that are dark brown externally and hyaline internally. Conidiogenous cells are phialidic, club-shaped to ampulliform, and hyaline. The conidia are one-celled, smooth, and hyaline, ellipsoid to ovoid, sometimes slightly constricted in the middle, and often contain one or more oil droplets; they measure roughly 3–4 μm long by 2–3 μm wide and form a pale brown mass within the pycnidia.

On the host thallus the infection is expressed as distinct discoloured spots. Diederich observed that the first visible sign is a black patch produced by the fungal mycelium. As the diseased area enlarges, the centre becomes pale, and in the final stage the thallus shows a white spot with a sharp black margin that encloses one or more of the tiny pycnidia.
