= Léopold Reichling =

Luxembourgish botanist and entomologist

Léopold Nicolas Reichling
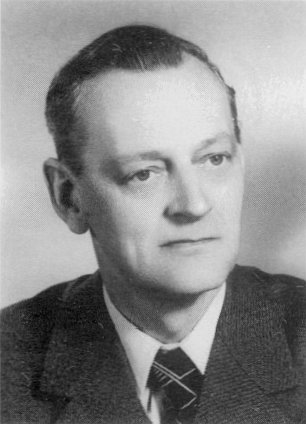
- Born: 11 March 1921; Luxembourg
- Died: 2 May 2009 (aged 88)

Léopold Nicolas Reichling (March 11, 1921 in Luxembourg City – May 2, 2009) was a Luxembourgish biologist and naturalist.

He is especially known for his publications in the fields of botany, zoology and nature conservation. He assembled three major scientific collections: an herbarium, a collection of heteroptera and a collection of human artefacts of the Stone Age.

The following are some taxa that were named after Léopold Reichling:

- Asplenium ×reichlingii Lawalrée, 1951; a monstrous form of the fern Asplenium trichomanes;
- Taraxacum reichlingii Soest, 1971; a plant;
- Lichenoconium reichlingii Diederich, 1986; a fungus;
- Reichlingia leopoldii Diederich & Scheid., 1996; a lichen.

== Career ==
Léopold Reichling began his career in 1949 as a teacher of biology at the "Lycée de garçons" in Luxembourg-city. In 1957, he became professor of botany to the "Cours supérieurs de Luxembourg" (precursor of University of Luxembourg). Reichling is considered a pioneer of phytosociology in Luxembourg and an eminent specialist in the flora of the Grand Duchy. After his retirement in 1981, he intensively devoted himself to the investigation of terrestrial heteroptera in Luxembourg.

Léopold Reichling was president of the Luxembourg Naturalist Society (Société des naturalistes luxembourgeois, SNL) (1962–1968) and of the league "Natura", an overhead organization of nature conservation. In 1997, he accepted the prize “Hëllef fir d'Natur” in recognition of his research tasks and his commitment in favor of nature conservation in Luxembourg.

== Bibliography (selection) ==
Botany

- Reichling, L., 1951. Les forêts du Grès de Luxembourg. Bull. Soc. r. Bot. Belg. 83: 163–212.
- Reichling, L., 1954. L’élément atlantique dans la végétation de la vallée inférieure de l’Ernz noire (G.-D. de Luxembourg). Archs Inst. g.-d. Luxemb., sect. sci. nat., phys. math. 21: 99–114.
- Reichling, L., 1955. Les Epipactis de la flore luxembourgeoise. Archs Inst. g.-d. Luxemb., sect. sci. nat., phys., math., N.S., 22: 123–145.
- Reichling, L., 1958. Application de cartes à réseau au recensement floristique du Grand-Duché de Luxembourg. Bull. Soc. Nat. Luxemb. 61 (1956): 12–28, Supplément, 16 S.
- Reichling, L., 1965. Die luxemburgischen Standorte des Hautfarns Hymenophyllum tunbrigense (L.) Sm. Ber. Arbeitsgem. sächs. Botan., N.F. 5-6 (1963/64) (1): 141-154
- Reichling, L., 1966. Les Marchantiales-Marchantiineae de la ville de Luxembourg. Bull. Soc. Nat. luxemb. 67: 3-26.
- Reichling, L., 1970. Die Gattung Epipactis in Luxemburg. Jber. naturw. Ver. Wuppertal, 23 : 88–97.
- Reichling, L., 1974. In Luxemburg geschützte Pflanzen. Übersicht sowie Anleitung zum Kennenlernen der in Luxemburg geschützten wildwachsenden Pflanzenarten. Natura (éd.), Luxemburg, 23 p.
- Reichling, L., 1981. 30 années d'observations floristiques au Luxembourg, 1949-1979. Bull. Soc. Nat. luxemb. 83-84: 75–95.
- Reichling, L., 1990. Observations floristiques au Luxembourg 1980-1989. Bull. Soc. Nat. luxemb. 90 (1990): 55–70.
- Reichling, L. & R. Thorn (collab.), 1997. Trichomanes speciosum Willd., un mystérieux passager clandestin. Adoxa, No 15/16 (avril 1997): 1–3.

Zoology

- Reichling, L., 1951. Le Gastéropode Helix aspersa Müller (petit-gris) aux environs de Luxembourg. Bull. Soc. Nat. luxemb. 55 : 362–367.
- Reichling, L., 1952. Nouvelles observations du Gastéropode Helix aspersa Müller au Grand-Duché de Luxembourg. Bull. Soc. Nat. luxemb. 56: 24–25.
- Reichling, L. 1984. Hétéroptères du Grand-Duché de Luxembourg. 1. Psallus (Hylopsallus) pseudoplatani n. sp. (Miridae, Phylinae) et espèces apparentées. Travaux Scientifiques du Musée d'Histoire Naturelle de Luxembourg, 4 (1): 1–18.
- Reichling, L., 1985. Hétéroptères du Grand-Duché de Luxembourg. 2. Quelques espèces peu connues, rares ou inattendues. Travaux Scientifiques du Musée d'Histoire Naturelle de Luxembourg, 4 (2): 1-45.
- Reichling, L., 2001. Atlas des hétéroptères non-aquatiques du Luxembourg. Travaux Scientifiques du Musée d'Histoire Naturelle de Luxembourg: 1–134.

== Sources ==
- G. Hausemer, 2006. Luxemburger Lexikon. Das Großherzogtum von A-Z. Editions Binsfeld, Luxembourg, 479 p. (Reichling: p. 357). ISBN 978-2-87954-156-3.
- J.A. Massard, 1990. La Société des Naturalistes Luxembourgeois du point de vue historique. Bulletin de la Société des naturalistes luxembourgeois 91: 5-214 (Reichling: p. 167-168).
- J. Werner, 1986. Léopold Reichling a 65 ans. Bulletin de la Société des naturalistes luxembourgeois 86 : 3–4.
- J. Werner, 2009. Hommage à Léopold Reichling (1921-2009). In: Luxemburger Wort, No. 117, 20 May 2009, p. 85.
- P. Ziesaire, 2009. Léopold Reichling: zwanzig Jahre vor- und frühgeschichtliche Forschung und Prospektion in Luxemburg. Eine Hommage an einen eminenten Luxemburger Naturwissenschaftler. Bulletin de la Société préhistorique luxembourgeoise 27-28 (2005–2007): 9-60.
