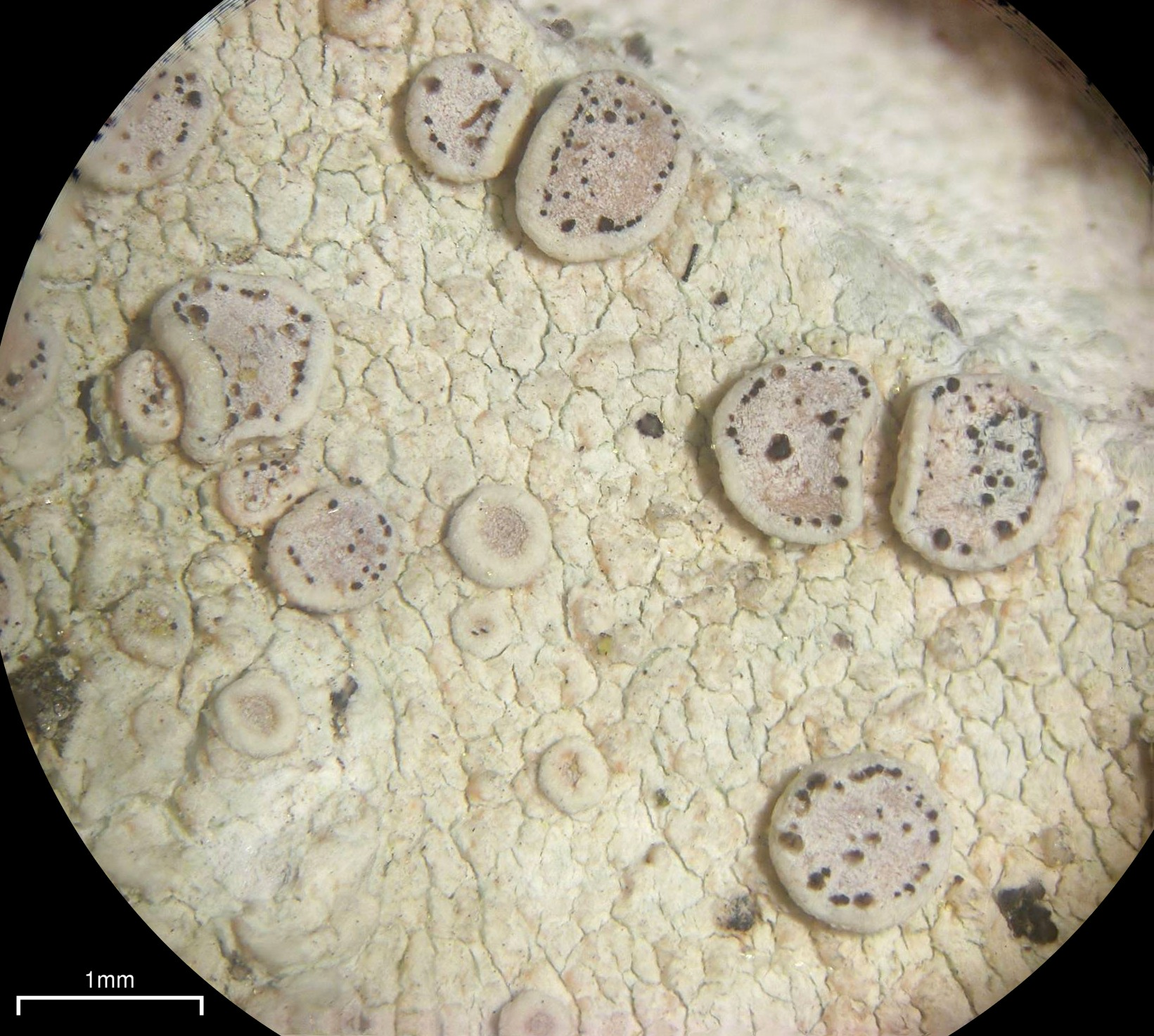
- Lichenoconium lecanorae parasitizing Lecanora albella

Scientific classification
- Kingdom: Fungi
- Division: Ascomycota
- Class: Dothideomycetes
- Order: Lichenoconiales
- Family: Lichenoconiaceae
- Genus: Lichenoconium; Petr. & Syd. (1927)

Type species
- Lichenoconium lichenicola (P.Karst.) Petr. & Syd. (1927)

Species
- See text

= Lichenoconium =

Genus of fungi

Lichenoconium is a genus of lichenicolous (lichen-dwelling) fungi belonging to the family Lichenoconiaceae.

The genus was circumscribed by Franz Petrak and Hans Sydow in 1927, with Lichenoconium lichenicola assigned as the type species.

== Species ==
The genus has a cosmopolitan distribution. As of January 2022, Species Fungorum accepts 16 species in Lichenoconium:

- Lichenoconium aeruginosum Diederich, M.Brand, van den Boom & Lawrey (2011)
- Lichenoconium cargillianum (Linds.) D.Hawksw. (1977)
- Lichenoconium christiansenii M.S.Cole & D.Hawksw. (2004)
- Lichenoconium echinosporum D.Hawksw. (1977)
- Lichenoconium edgewoodense Alstrup & M.S.Cole (1998)
- Lichenoconium erodens M.S.Christ. & D.Hawksw. (1977)
- Lichenoconium follmannii S.Y.Kondr. & D.J.Galloway (1995)
- Lichenoconium hawksworthii Flakus, Etayo, Kukwa & Rodr.Flakus (2021)
- Lichenoconium laevisporum Kalb & Hafellner (1995)
- Lichenoconium lecanorae (Jaap) D.Hawksw. (1979)
- Lichenoconium lichenicola (P.Karst.) Petr. & Syd. (1927)
- Lichenoconium parasiticum D.Hawksw. (1977)
- Lichenoconium plectocarpoides S.Y.Kondr., D.J.Galloway & D.Hawksw. (1994)
- Lichenoconium pyxidatae (Oudem.) Petr. & Syd. (1927)
- Lichenoconium reichlingii Diederich (1986)
- Lichenoconium usneae (Anzi) D.Hawksw. (1977)
- Lichenoconium xanthoriae M.S.Christ. (1956)
