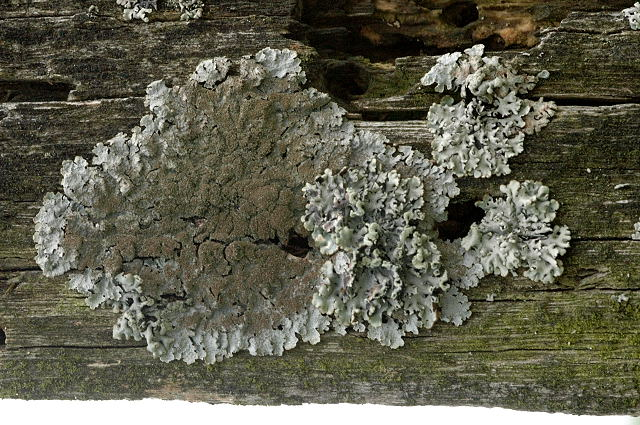
- Parmelina tiliacea

Scientific classification
- Domain: Eukaryota
- Kingdom: Fungi
- Division: Ascomycota
- Class: Lecanoromycetes
- Order: Lecanorales
- Family: Parmeliaceae
- Genus: Parmelina; Hale (1974)

Type species
- Parmelina tiliacea (Hoffm.) Hale (1974)

= Parmelina =

Genus of lichen

Parmelina is a genus of lichen belonging to the family Parmeliaceae. The genus was circumscribed in 1974 by American lichenologist Mason Hale with Parmelina tiliacea assigned as the type species.

== Species ==
- Parmelina atricha (Nyl.) P.Clerc (2008)
- Parmelina carporrhizans (Taylor) Hale (1974)
- Parmelina coleae Argüello & A.Crespo (2007)
- Parmelina cryptotiliacea A.Crespo & Núñez-Zapata (2011) – Spain
- Parmelina gyrophorica Elix, Sheng L.Wang & J.B.Chen (2000)
- Parmelina kanakia Louwhoff & Elix (2000)
- Parmelina pastillifera (Harm.) Hale (1976)
- Parmelina quercina (Willd.) Hale (1974)
- Parmelina tiliacea (Hoffm.) Hale (1974)
- Parmelina yalungana (Zahlbr.) P.R.Nelson & Kepler (2012)

All species of Parmelina with an Australasian-South African distribution were transferred to the new genus Austroparmelina in 2010.
