= Austroparmelina chlorolecanorica =

Scientific classification
- Kingdom: Fungi
- Division: Ascomycota
- Class: Lecanoromycetes
- Order: Lecanorales
- Family: Parmeliaceae
- Genus: Austroparmelina
- Species: A. chlorolecanorica

Binomial name
- Austroparmelina chlorolecanorica (Elix) A.Crespo, Divakar & Elix (2010)
- Holotype: unnamed Nature Reserve, Western Australia

Synonyms
- Parmeliopsis chlorolecanorica Elix (2007)

Species of lichen-forming fungus

Austroparmelina chlorolecanorica is a species of corticolous (bark-dwelling) foliose lichen in the family Parmeliaceae. It forms small, pale grey, leafy patches on tree bark in dry eucalypt woodlands of inland Western Australia. Originally described in 2007 as a member of the genus Parmeliopsis, it was transferred to the newly established genus Austroparmelina in 2010 based on DNA evidence showing its relationship to other Southern Hemisphere species.

== Taxonomy ==
Parmeliopsis chlorolecanorica was described as new by John Elix from south-western Western Australia. It was separated from the outwardly similar P. macrospora on chemical grounds: whereas P. macrospora contains scabrosin diacetate and shows no reaction to standard chemical spot tests, P. chlorolecanorica has a medulla containing lecanoric acid along with rare chlorinated derivatives (5-chlorolecanoric and 3,5-dichlorolecanoric acids), which produce strong red colour reactions when tested with certain reagents (C+ and KC+ tests). The specific epithet refers to these rare chlorinated depsides, which have otherwise been recorded only sparingly in lichen chemistry.

In 2010, Ana Crespo and co-workers introduced the genus Austroparmelina for a distinct Australasian lineage of parmelioid lichens identified through a DNA analysis of multiple genetic markers. They transferred Parmeliopsis chlorolecanorica to this genus as Austroparmelina chlorolecanorica because it shares the group's characteristic features, including narrow grey lobes, a similar fruiting-body structure, and occurrence in the Southern Hemisphere.

== Description ==
The bark-dwelling thallus of Austroparmelina chlorolecanorica is foliose (leafy), firmly attached and relatively small, usually 2–3 cm across. Its lobes are narrow and somewhat irregular (about 1–2 mm wide), closely set to overlapping and irregularly branched; the tips are shallowly incised and the margins lack cilia. The upper surface is pale grey, smooth and essentially flat, with scattered white mottling and a light pruina near the lobe tips; there are no soredia, isidia or marginal lobules. The medulla is white. Beneath, the surface is mid- to dark brown and carries a moderate to dense cover of simple rhizines.

Fertile structures are frequent. Apothecia are sessile to shortly stalked, 0.8–2.0 mm across; the disc is mid- to dark brown, initially weakly concave and later more or less flat. The rim starts thick and lightly frosted, becoming thinner yet persisting with age. Ascospores are characteristically kidney-shaped (reniform) with two oil drops (biguttulate), measuring about 17–21 × 4–5 μm. Pycnidia are common and immersed with black ostioles; conidia are long, thread-like and gently curved, about 9–11 × 1 μm.

Spot tests and chemistry: cortex K+ (yellow); medulla K–, C+ (red), KC+ (red), P–. Identified lichen substances include atranorin and chloroatranorin in the cortex (minor) and, in the medulla, lecanoric acid (major), 5-chlorolecanoric acid (submajor) and 3,5-dichlorolecanoric acid (minor).

== Habitat and distribution ==
The species occurs in dry eucalypt woodlands of inland Western Australia. It was described from an unnamed nature reserve east of Merredin, where it grew on a dead shrub at around 380 m elevation in Eucalyptus–Melaleuca woodland. Additional collections show a similar ecological range: on Callitris in Eucalyptus–Callitris woodland with an Acacia understorey north of Bullfinch; on Acacia in Eucalyptus woodland near Goongarrie; and near Corinthia on Callitris. Records indicate that A. chlorolecanorica is endemic to Western Australia, occurring sympatrically with A. macrospora but separable from it by its distinctive medullary chemistry.
