= Reichlingia zwackhii =

Scientific classification
- Kingdom: Fungi
- Division: Ascomycota
- Class: Arthoniomycetes
- Order: Arthoniales
- Family: Arthoniaceae
- Genus: Reichlingia
- Species: R. zwackhii

Binomial name
- Reichlingia zwackhii (Sandst.) Frisch & G.Thor (2013)

Synonyms
- Arthonia zwackhii Sandst. (1903)

Species of lichen

Reichlingia zwackhii is a species of corticolous (bark-dwelling) lichen in the family Arthoniaceae. It is found in temperate woodland habitats across parts of Europe. It typically grows on the moist bark of mature beech, ash, and oak trees in ancient forests, often appearing as a parasite or semi-parasite on other lichens, although it can occasionally live independently. The lichen is rare but widespread in southern and southwestern England, with very limited occurrences reported in Scotland, Wales, and Ireland. Described scientifically in 1903, it was transferred to its current genus, Reichlingia, in 2013.

== Taxonomy ==
It was first formally described by the German lichenologist Heinrich Sandstede in 1903, as a member of genus Arthonia. Andreas Frisch and Göran Thor transferred it to the genus Reichlingia in 2013. The lichen occurs in temperate regions of Europe. Peter Wilfred James proposed the variety Arthonia zwackhii var. macrospora in 1978, on the basis of specimens collected from Britain that had consistently larger ascospores and different lichen products. This taxon is now known as a distinct species, Synarthonia astroidestera.

== Description ==
Reichlingia zwackhii forms a thin, crust-like (effuse) growth known as a thallus, measuring up to 80 μm in thickness. Its surface colour ranges from white to pale grey, presenting a matt texture and slightly cracked (rimose) appearance. Like many lichens, it has a green algal partner (photobiont), specifically from the genus Trentepohlia.

The reproductive structures, known as apothecia, are abundant and frequently densely packed together. They typically have irregular star-shaped (stellate) forms, reaching up to 1.2 mm across, although occasionally they may appear rounded or polygonal and significantly smaller, at only 0.2–0.3 mm. Apothecia have a reddish-brown colour, but their surfaces usually bear a thin, white powdery coating (pruina). In microscopic cross-section, apothecia measure between 65 and 95 μm in height.

The upper layer of the fruiting body (epithecium) is red-brown and turns pale green when exposed to potassium hydroxide solution (K+ test). Beneath this, the hymenium—the fertile layer containing reproductive cells—is 40–50 μm tall and colourless or slightly reddish-brown at the top. The layer beneath the hymenium, called the hypothecium, measures 15–35 μm in height and is colourless or pale straw-coloured. Paraphysoids—thread-like supportive filaments within the hymenium—are typically 1–2 μm wide but have thicker, brown-coloured walls (up to 2.5 μm) in the epithecium, occasionally capped at the tips.

Spores (ascospores) produced by Reichlingia zwackhii are cylindrical to obovoid, with dimensions of 16–22 (occasionally up to 24) by 5–7 μm, divided into three or four compartments (3-septate). The uppermost spore cell is enlarged. Older spores turn brown and develop a warty surface texture. Pycnidia, another form of reproductive structure found in some lichens, have not been observed in this species.

Chemical spot tests on the thallus yield variable results: the cortex shows no reaction with C− or KC−; the K test is patchy, initially yellow, turning red due to crystal formation; and para-phenylenediamine (Pd) tests vary, either negative or occasionally yellow in patches. It does not fluoresce under ultraviolet (UV) light. Chemically, the lichen contains an unidentified secondary metabolite previously named 'substance A', and traces of norstictic acid are likely derived from its host substrate rather than produced by the lichen itself.

== Habitat distribution, and ecology ==
Reichlingia zwackhii grows primarily on moist, mesic bark of mature trees such as beech (Fagus), ash (Fraxinus), and oak (Quercus) within ancient woodland environments. It commonly colonises and visibly invades the thalli (lichen bodies) of the species Phlyctis argena, and more rarely, Phlyctis agelaea, from which it occasionally acquires patchy deposits of norstictic acid. Although typically found as a parasitic or semi-parasitic lichen, R. zwackhii can sometimes grow as an independent organism.

In terms of distribution, in the United Kingdom, this species is considered rare but occurs widely across southern and southwestern England, spanning from Cornwall eastwards to Sussex. It is very rare in Scotland, recorded specifically in East Perthshire, and has limited occurrences in southwestern and northwestern Wales, as well as in Ireland.
