= Lichenoconium edgewoodense =

Scientific classification
- Kingdom: Fungi
- Division: Ascomycota
- Class: Dothideomycetes
- Order: Lichenoconiales
- Family: Lichenoconiaceae
- Genus: Lichenoconium
- Species: L. edgewoodense

Binomial name
- Lichenoconium edgewoodense Alstrup & M.S.Cole (1998)
- Holotype: Clearwater River Basin, British Columbia

Species of fungus

Lichenoconium edgewoodense is a species of lichenicolous (lichen-dwelling) fungus in the family Lichenoconiaceae. This parasitic fungus was described as a new species in 1998 by Vagn Alstrup and Mariette S. Cole. The species epithet, originally published with the spelling edgewoodensis, was later corrected to edgewoodense. The host of the fungus is the common and widespread foliose lichen species Parmelia sulcata. Lichenoconium edgewoodense has been recorded from British Columbia (Canada) and South Greenland.

== Description ==
Lichenoconium edgewoodense is a lichenicolous fungus, meaning it grows on and may derive nutrients from lichens. Early in its life cycle, it behaves as a parasite, potentially transitioning to a saprophytic (feeding on dead or decaying material) lifestyle as it matures. The fungal reproductive structures, known as pycnidia, are small and often partially embedded in the host lichen's surface. They measure up to about 0.15 mm in diameter. Initially, these pycnidia remain hidden beneath the lichen's cortex (its outer layer), appearing as dispersed greyish spots on a visibly unhealthy lichen thallus. As they mature, the pycnidia develop broad, black openings (ostioles) through which spores are released.

The cells that produce the spores (conidiogenous cells) are roughly 6–8 micrometres (μm) long and about 2 μm wide. The spores themselves (conidia) are oblong, slightly constricted in the middle, and measure about 5–6 by 3.0–3.5 μm. These conidia are thicker-walled than those of many related species and have smooth surfaces. The distinctive shape of the conidia sets Lichenoconium edgewoodense apart from other members of Lichenoconium, which typically have rounder or differently constricted spores.

== Habitat and distribution ==
This fungus was originally described from specimens collected from the type locality in British Columbia's interior cedar-hemlock forest zone, at an elevation of roughly 700 metres. It is found on Parmelia sulcata, a common foliose lichen species. Its known range was extended greatly when it was recorded from South Greenland in 2009.
