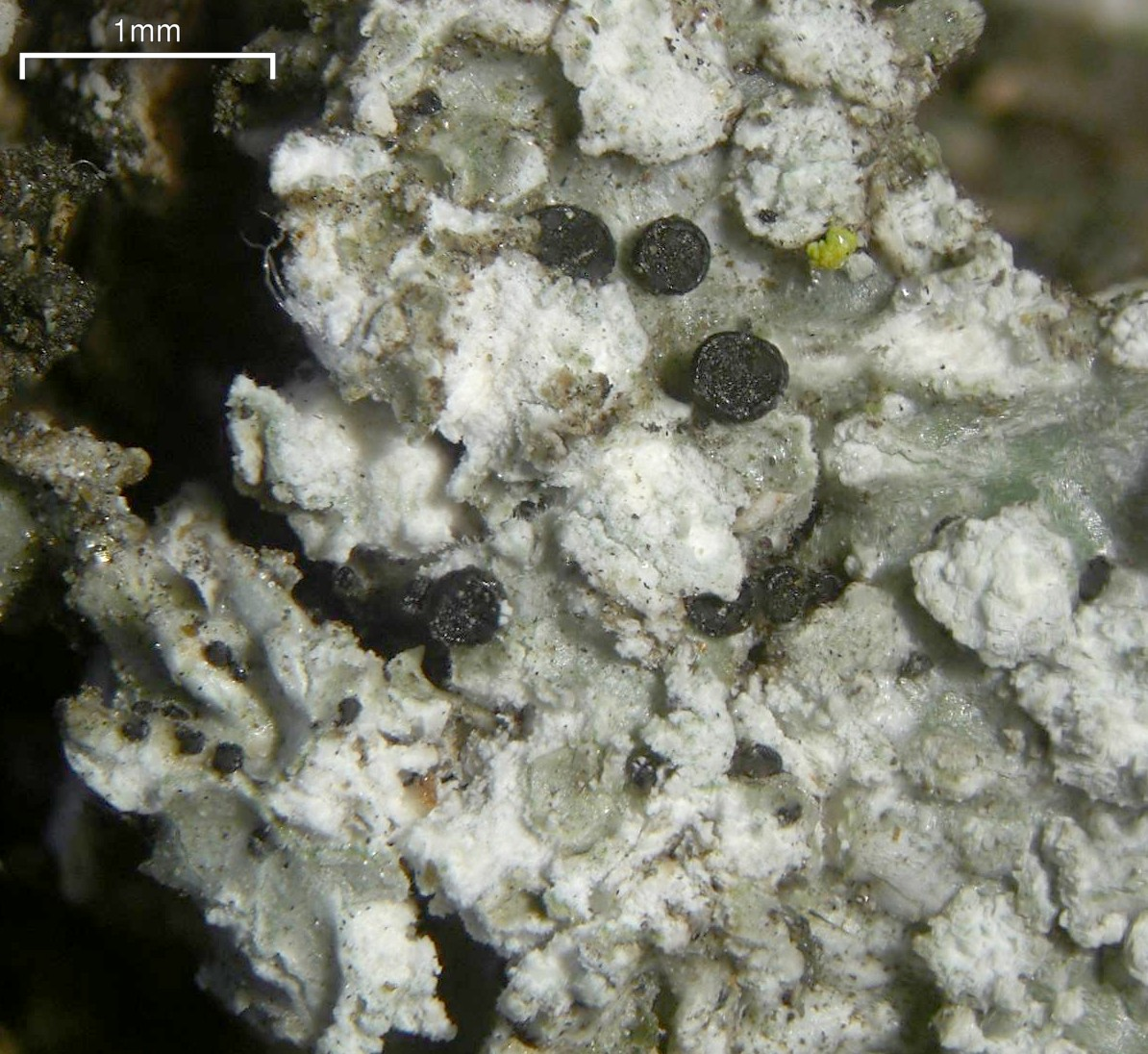
- Sclerococcum parasiticum (black discs) growing on Pertusaria albescens

Scientific classification
- Kingdom: Fungi
- Division: Ascomycota
- Class: Eurotiomycetes
- Order: Sclerococcales
- Family: Dactylosporaceae
- Genus: Sclerococcum; Fr. (1825)

Type species
- Sclerococcum sphaerale (Ach.) Fr. (1825)

Synonyms
- Dactylospora Körb. (1855)

= Sclerococcum =

Genus of fungi

Sclerococcum is a genus of lichenicolous fungi in the family Dactylosporaceae.

== Taxonomy ==
The genus was circumscribed in 1825 by Elias Magnus Fries. The type species is Sclerococcum sphaerale, originally described in 1814 by Erik Acharius (as Spiloma sphaerale). This fungus is a lichenicolous hyphomycete – a mould that lives on a lichen. Most of the Sclerococcum species described since then are also lichenicolous, and most have a restricted host range. Molecular phylogenetics analysis published in 2012 showed that Sclerococcum sphaerale grouped together in a clade with species of Dactylospora in the class Eurotiomycetes.

In 2016, Réblová and colleagues proposed a new family Sclerococcaceae in a new order (Sclerococcales) to accommodate the type genus Sclerococcum, Dactylospora, Rhopalophora, three strains of beetle-associated fungi, and an isolate of Fusichalara minuta. This classification was not accepted in the 2017 Outline of the Ascomycota, which retained the family Dactylosporaceae.

== Species ==
- Sclerococcum acarosporae S.Y.Kondr. (2002)
- Sclerococcum acarosporicola Ertz & Diederich (2018)
- Sclerococcum aeruginosum (Holien & Ihlen) Ertz & Diederich (2018)
- Sclerococcum ahtii (Zhurb. & Pino-Bodas) Ertz & Diederich (2018)
- Sclerococcum allantoideum (Alstrup & D.Hawksw.) Ertz & Diederich (2018)
- Sclerococcum amygdalariae (Triebel) Ertz & Diederich (2018)
- Sclerococcum anziae (Zhurb., Ezhkin, Skirina & Y.Ohmura) Ertz & Diederich (2018)
- Sclerococcum aptrootii Diederich (2015)
- Sclerococcum areolatum Etayo (2008)
- Sclerococcum arthrobotryinum (Hafellner) Olariaga, Teres, J.M.Martín, M.Prieto & Baral (2019)
- Sclerococcum aspiciliicola (Alstrup & D.Hawksw.) Ertz & Diederich (2018)
- Sclerococcum athallinum (Müll.Arg.) Ertz & Diederich (2018)
- Sclerococcum attendendum (Nyl.) Ertz & Diederich (2018)
- Sclerococcum australe (Triebel & Hertel) Ertz & Diederich (2018)
- Sclerococcum bloxamii (Berk. & W.Phillips) Olariaga, Teres, J.M.Martín, M.Prieto & Baral (2019)
- Sclerococcum boreale (Holien & Ihlen) Ertz & Diederich (2018)
- Sclerococcum caledonicum (Hafellner) Olariaga, Teres, J.M.Martín, M.Prieto & Baral (2019)
- Sclerococcum canariense (Kohlm. & Volkm.-Kohlm.) Olariaga, Teres, J.M.Martín, M.Prieto & Baral (2019)
- Sclerococcum cladoniicola (Alstrup & Olech) Ertz & Diederich (2018)
- Sclerococcum crassitunicatum Zhurb., Diederich & U.Braun (2017)
- Sclerococcum crassum (Sarrión & Hafellner) Ertz & Diederich (2018)
- Sclerococcum davidii (Hafellner & H.Mayrhofer) Ertz & Diederich (2018)
- Sclerococcum deminutum (Th.Fr.) Ertz & Diederich (2018)
- Sclerococcum dendriscostictae Y.Joshi (2021) – India
- Sclerococcum dobrowolskii (Olech & Alstrup) Ertz & Diederich (2018)
- Sclerococcum epicladonia Zhurb. (2017)
- Sclerococcum epimyces (Tobisch) Olariaga, Teres, J.M.Martín, M.Prieto & Baral (2019)
- Sclerococcum epiphytorum Diederich (1990)
- Sclerococcum ewersii Elix, P.M.McCarthy & Hafellner (2019) – Australia
- Sclerococcum fissurinae Pérez-Ort. (2020) – Alaska
- Sclerococcum frigidum (Hafellner) Ertz & Diederich (2018)
- Sclerococcum gelidarium Etayo & F.Berger (2000)
- Sclerococcum glaucomarioides (Willey ex Tuck.) Ertz & Diederich (2018)
- Sclerococcum griseisporodochium Etayo (1995)
- Sclerococcum hafellnerianum (Sérus.) Ertz & Diederich (2018)
- Sclerococcum haliotrephum (Kohlm. & E.Kohlm.) Ertz & Diederich (2018)
- Sclerococcum heterodermiae (Etayo) Ertz & Diederich (2018)
- Sclerococcum homoclinellum (Nyl.) Ertz & Diederich (2018)
- Sclerococcum imperfectum (Ellis) Olariaga, Teres, J.M.Martín, M.Prieto & Baral (2019)
- Sclerococcum inconspicuum (Etayo) Ertz & Diederich (2018)
- Sclerococcum inopinum (Döbbeler & W.R.Buck) Olariaga, Teres, J.M.Martín, M.Prieto & Baral (2019)
- Sclerococcum inquilinum (Tuck.) Ertz & Diederich (2018)
- Sclerococcum leuckertii Diederich & P.Scholz (1995)
- Sclerococcum lobariellum (Nyl.) Ertz & Diederich (2018)
- Sclerococcum luridum (Hafellner) Olariaga, Teres, J.M.Martín, M.Prieto & Baral (2019)
- Sclerococcum mangrovei (E.B.G.Jones, Alias, Abdel-Wahab & S.Y.Hsieh) Ertz & Diederich (2018)
- Sclerococcum mediterraneum (Sarrión & Hafellner) Olariaga, Teres, J.M.Martín, M.Prieto & Baral (2019)
- Sclerococcum microsporum (Etayo) Ertz & Diederich (2018)
- Sclerococcum montagnei Hafellner (1996) – Macaronesia
- Sclerococcum olivaceum Etayo & F.Berger (2004)
- Sclerococcum ophthalmizae Coppins (2018)
- Sclerococcum orygmaeum (Nyl.) Ertz & Diederich (2018)
- Sclerococcum parasitaster (Nyl.) Ertz & Diederich (2018)
- Sclerococcum parasiticum (Flörke) Ertz & Diederich (2018)
- Sclerococcum parellarium (Nyl.) Ertz & Diederich (2018)
- Sclerococcum pertusariicola (Willey ex Tuck.) Ertz & Diederich (2018)
- Sclerococcum phaeophysciae Diederich & van den Boom (2017)
- Sclerococcum phyllobaeis Etayo (2017)
- Sclerococcum physciae Y.Joshi (2021) – India
- Sclerococcum pleiospermum (Triebel) Ertz & Diederich (2018)
- Sclerococcum polysporum (Triebel) Ertz & Diederich (2018)
- Sclerococcum porphyreum (Hafellner & Kalb) Ertz & Diederich (2018)
- Sclerococcum protothallinum (Anzi) Ertz & Diederich (2018)
- Sclerococcum pseudourceolatum (Sarrión & Hafellner) Olariaga, Teres, J.M.Martín, M.Prieto & Baral (2019)
- Sclerococcum purpurascens (Triebel) Ertz & Diederich (2018)
- Sclerococcum pyrenaicum (Etayo) Ertz & Diederich (2018)
- Sclerococcum rhyparizae (Arnold) Ertz & Diederich (2018)
- Sclerococcum ricasoliae (Vouaux) Flakus, Rodr.Flakus & Etayo (2019)
- Sclerococcum rimulicola (Müll.Arg.) Ertz & Diederich (2018)
- Sclerococcum rostrupii (Alstrup) Ertz & Diederich (2018)
- Sclerococcum rubiginosum (Hafellner) Olariaga, Teres, J.M.Martín, M.Prieto & Baral (2019)
- Sclerococcum saxatile (Schaer.) Ertz & Diederich (2018)
- Sclerococcum serusiauxii Boqueras & Diederich (1993)
- Sclerococcum simplex D.Hawksw. (1979)
- Sclerococcum sipmanii Diederich (2015)
- Sclerococcum sphaerale (Ach.) Fr. (1825)
- Sclerococcum stipitatum (Hafellner) Olariaga, Teres, J.M.Martín, M.Prieto & Baral (2019)
- Sclerococcum stygium (Berk. & M.A.Curtis) Olariaga, Teres, J.M.Martín, M.Prieto & Baral (2019)
- Sclerococcum suburceolatum (Coppins & Fryday) Ertz & Diederich (2018)
- Sclerococcum tegularum (Arnold) Ertz & Diederich (2018)
- Sclerococcum tephromelarum Etayo & Calat. (1998)
- Sclerococcum thelotrematicola (Elix) Fryday (2019)
- Sclerococcum toensbergii Diederich (2017)
- Sclerococcum urceolatum (Th.Fr.) Ertz & Diederich (2018)
- Sclerococcum verrucisporum Alstrup (1993)
- Sclerococcum verruculosum (Hafellner) Olariaga, Teres, J.M.Martín, M.Prieto & Baral (2019)
- Sclerococcum vrijmoediae (K.L.Pang, Sheng Y.Guo, Alias, Hafellner & E.B.G.Jones) Ertz & Diederich (2018)
