= Lichenoconium lichenicola =

Scientific classification
- Domain: Eukaryota
- Kingdom: Fungi
- Division: Ascomycota
- Class: Dothideomycetes
- Order: Lichenoconiales
- Family: Lichenoconiaceae
- Genus: Lichenoconium
- Species: L. lichenicola

Binomial name
- Lichenoconium lichenicola (P.Karst.) Petr. & Syd. (1927)

Synonyms
- Dactylium dendroides subsp. lichenicola P.Karst. (1887)

Species of fungus

Lichenoconium lichenicola is a species of lichenicolous fungus belonging to the class Dothideomycetes.
