= Reichlingia americana =

Scientific classification
- Kingdom: Fungi
- Division: Ascomycota
- Class: Arthoniomycetes
- Order: Arthoniales
- Family: Arthoniaceae
- Genus: Reichlingia
- Species: R. americana

Binomial name
- Reichlingia americana C.A.Morse & Ladd

Species of lichen

Reichlingia americana is a white crustose lichen that grows on rocks and was first observed in the United States in the Osage Wildlife Management Area of Oklahoma in 2018.

== Distribution ==
The species has only been collected from Oklahoma in the United States, and is the only member of the genus reported from the country. The genus was first described from Europe in 1996.

== Habitat ==
When it was first described, the species had only been collected three times, all from sheltered faces of non-calcareous sandstone cliffs, in areas with high light exposure.

== Identification ==
Reichlingia americana contains notable quantities of 2'-O-methylperlatolic acid, which has been observed in several other genera of Arthoniomycetes, but R. americana distinguishes itself from other Arthoniomycetes due to its unique white, cracked, thallus with immersed apothecia and unique spore morphology (spores are submuriform with a terminal cell bigger than the others). Those spores, and that chemistry, combined with the habitat preference and geographic distribution, distinguish it from other members of the Reichlingia genus.
