= Austroparmelina =

Scientific classification
- Domain: Eukaryota
- Kingdom: Fungi
- Division: Ascomycota
- Class: Lecanoromycetes
- Order: Lecanorales
- Family: Parmeliaceae
- Genus: Austroparmelina; A.Crespo, Divakar & Elix (2010)

Type species
- Austroparmelina endoleuca (Taylor) A.Crespo, Divakar & Elix (2009)

Genus of lichens

Austroparmelina is a genus of foliose lichens in the large family Parmeliaceae. It contains species formerly placed in the genera Parmelina and Canoparmelia. All species of Austroparmelina have an Australasian-South African distribution. These lichens form small, flat rosettes that grow tightly attached to tree bark and rocks in temperate regions. They are characterised by narrow, strap-shaped lobes and unusually large spores compared to their northern relatives.

== Description ==
Austral by name and appearance, Austroparmelina lichens spread as small, leaf-like rosettes that hug the bark or rock so tightly it can be hard to prise away a lobe. Each lobe is narrow and strap-shaped—usually less than 5 mm across—with gently rounded tips and only the odd simple cilium along the margin. The upper surface is a dull grey to grey-green film of tightly packed cells covered by a perforated protective skin (cortex); it bears no true pores (pseudocyphellae), though some species produce powdery soredia or tiny wart-like isidia for vegetative dispersal. Beneath this skin the loosely woven medulla is chalk-white, while the underside is flat, smooth and black to dark brown, turning paler near the growing edge and sprouting short, unbranched rhizines that secure the thallus. Microscopically the cortex, medulla and rhizines show no amyloid reactions, and the photobiont partner is a single-celled green alga.

Sexual reproduction takes place in dark-brown, cup-shaped apothecia (fruiting bodies) that sit on the thallus surface or perch on a very short stalk. Their lateral wall (the proper exciple) is built of densely packed hyphae with thickened cell walls but lacks the carbon-black stain seen in many related genera; towards the rim the tissue remains pale even in section. Each ascus follows the Lecanora pattern and contains eight unusually large spores—typically 10–17 μm long and 4–7 μm wide—that are smooth, colourless and single-celled. Immersed flask-shaped pycnidia supply a second, asexual route: they release thread-like conidia roughly 6–9 μm long. Thin-layer chromatography shows a blend of common lichen products (atranorin and chloroatranorin in the cortex) and a southern-hemisphere cocktail in the medulla, including lecanoric acid, long-chain aliphatic acids, scabrosin derivatives and yellow naphthopyrone pigments; these chemicals help distinguish the genus from its northern relative Parmelina.

== Habitat and distribution ==
Austroparmelina is confined to the Southern Hemisphere. Eleven of its thirteen recognised species are endemic to southern and eastern Australia, Tasmania and New Zealand, where they are common components of temperate lichen communities. The genus prospers across a broad climatic transect: it endures the hot, summer-dry Mediterranean weather of Western and South Australia, persists through the warm–temperate rainfall regime along the eastern seaboard, and reaches its optimum in the cool, moist forests of Victoria, Tasmania and New Zealand. Two species (A. labrosa and A. pseudorelicina) extend the genus westward to the Drakensberg and other montane sites in South Africa, but no member has yet been recorded north of the Equator.

Ecologically the lichens are low-growing pioneers of well-lit, mildly nutrient-poor surfaces. Most species colonise the acid bark of eucalypts and other hardwoods, anchoring themselves with short, simple rhizines; several also settle on siliceous rocks and stable boulders in open woodland, heath or coastal scrub. They favour sites that remain reasonably airy and sun-exposed yet still receive regular dew or mist, and they are absent from the wettest rain-forest interiors as well as from arid inland zones. Their tight, appressed thalli help them resist wind-borne desiccation, while the chemical arsenal of atranorin, chloroatranorin and medullary aliphatic acids appears to deter grazing and enhance tolerance of high ultraviolet flux in Australasian and South African highlands alike.

== Species ==
As of 2025, Species Fungorum (in the Catalogue of Life) accept 16 species of Austroparmelina:

- Austroparmelina chlorolecanorica (Elix) A.Crespo, Divakar & Elix (2010)
- Austroparmelina conlabrosa (Hale) A.Crespo, Divakar & Elix (2010)
- Austroparmelina corrugativa (Kurok. & Filson) Elix & Kantvilas (2020)
- Austroparmelina elixii (Argüello & A.Crespo) A.Crespo, Divakar & Elix (2010)
- Austroparmelina endoleuca (Taylor) A.Crespo, Divakar & Elix (2010)
- Austroparmelina euplectina (Kurok. ex Elix) A.Crespo, Divakar & Elix (2010)
- Austroparmelina johnstoniae (Elix) A.Crespo, Divakar & Elix (2010)
- Austroparmelina labrosa (Zahlbr.) A.Crespo, Divakar & Elix (2010)
- Austroparmelina macrospora (Elix & J.Johnst.) A.Crespo, Divakar & Elix (2010)
- Austroparmelina norpruinata (Elix & J.Johnst.) A.Crespo, Divakar & Elix (2010)
- Austroparmelina pallida (Elix & Kantvilas) Kantvilas & Divakar (2013)
- Austroparmelina pruinata (Müll.Arg.) A.Crespo, Divakar & Elix (2010)
- Austroparmelina pseudorelicina (Jatta) A.Crespo, Divakar & Elix (2010)
- Austroparmelina subarida (Elix) A.Crespo, Divakar & Elix (2010)
- Austroparmelina subtiliacea (Nyl.) A.Crespo, Divakar & Elix (2010)
- Austroparmelina whinrayi (Elix) Kantvilas & Divakar (2013)
