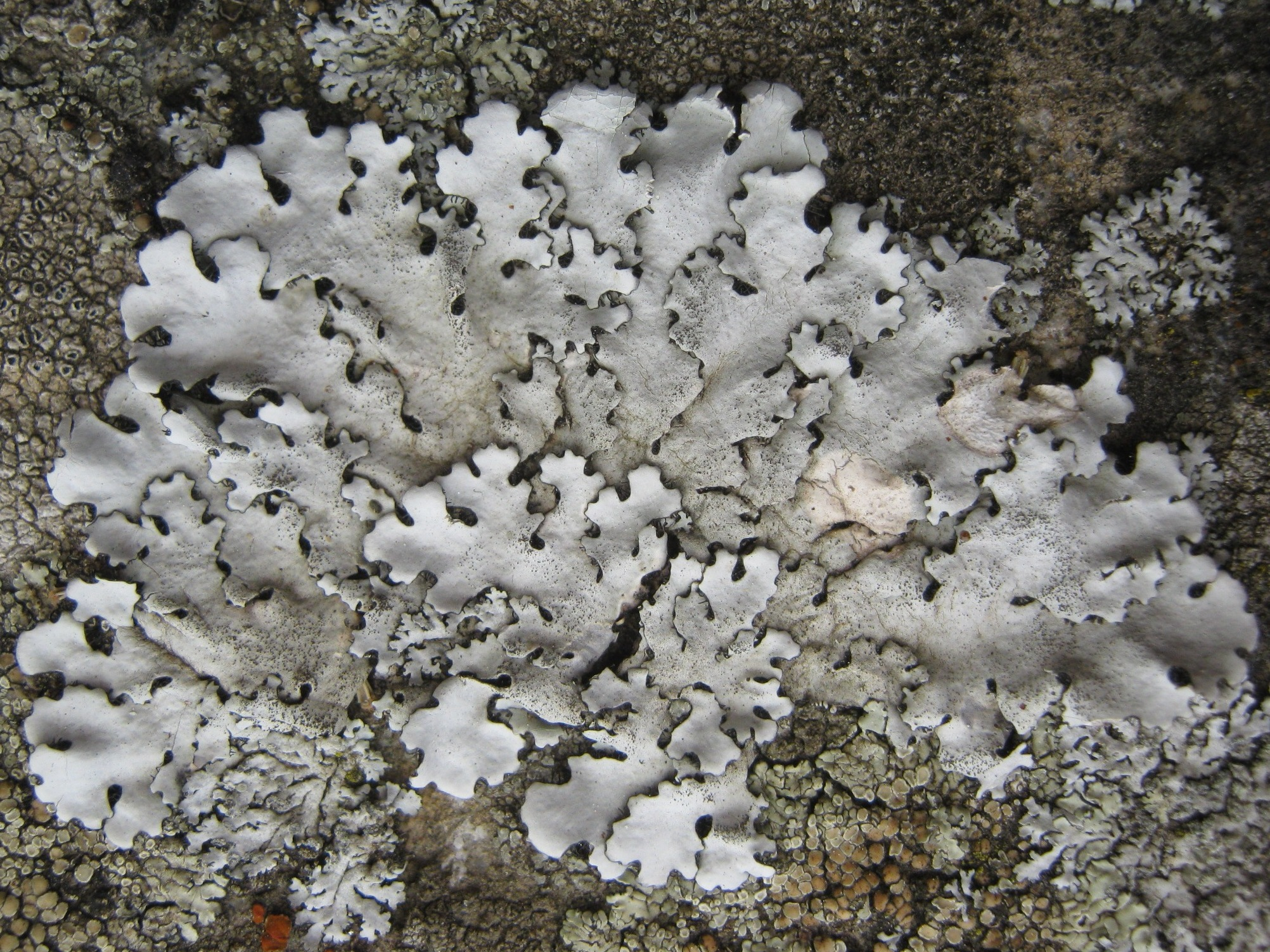

Scientific classification
- Kingdom: Fungi
- Division: Ascomycota
- Class: Lecanoromycetes
- Order: Lecanorales
- Family: Parmeliaceae
- Genus: Parmelina
- Species: P. pastillifera

Binomial name
- Parmelina pastillifera (Harm.) Hale (1976)

Synonyms
- Parmelia scortea var. pastillifera Harm. (1910); Parmelia tiliacea var. pastillifera (Harm.) Grummann (1963); Parmelia pastillifera (Harm.) R.Schub. & Klem. (1966)

= Parmelina pastillifera =

Species of lichen-forming fungus

Parmelina pastillifera is a species of foliose lichen in the family Parmeliaceae. The species forms greyish rosettes typically 4–8 cm across on nutrient-rich bark, particularly on ash and maple branches, as well as on rocks and tiles in exposed situations. It is readily identified by its characteristic button-like, blue-black outgrowths (isidia) that cover the lobes and often become dense in the centre of the thallus. The lichen occurs in Europe and Great Britain, where it is associated with well-lit habitats.

== Taxonomy ==
It was first scientifically described by the French lichenologist Julien Harmand in 1910, as a variety of Parmelia scortea. Rudolf Schubert and Oscar Klement raised it to species status in 1966. A decade later, Mason Hale reclassified it in Parmelina.

== Description ==
Parmelina pastillifera forms a closely attached, rosette-like thallus usually 4–8 cm across, occasionally reaching up to about 15 cm. The lobes are relatively narrow (about 3–7 mm wide), more or less linear and lie close together or slightly overlapping, often with a gently wavy appearance near the centre. Their margins are broadly rounded but irregularly indented, with short, hair-like cilia in the angles between adjacent lobes. The upper surface is mineral grey with a bluish tinge, faintly spotted and often dusted with a pale pruina towards the lobe tips. The underside is black, becoming brown near the lobe edges, and bears unbranched rhizines that extend right out to the margins.

The thallus is characteristically isidiate. The isidia are blue-black, laminal, and may be scattered across the lobes or form a dense covering in the centre. They begin as short, flat-topped outgrowths but their tips soon develop a raised rim, giving them a button-like appearance, and they can become knobbly, twisted and sometimes merge. Where apothecia are present they are reported to resemble those of Parmelina carporrhizans. In standard chemical spot tests, the cortex reacts K+ (yellow), while the medulla is C+ (carmine-red), KC+ (red), and negative with K and Pd and under UV light, indicating the presence of atranorin and lecanoric acid.

== Habitat and distribution ==
Parmelina pastillifera occurs in Europe and Great Britain. It grows on well-lit, nutrient-rich or nutrient-enriched bark, particularly on the branches of Fraxinus and Acer, and also grows on siliceous rocks, roof tiles and memorials in similarly exposed positions.
