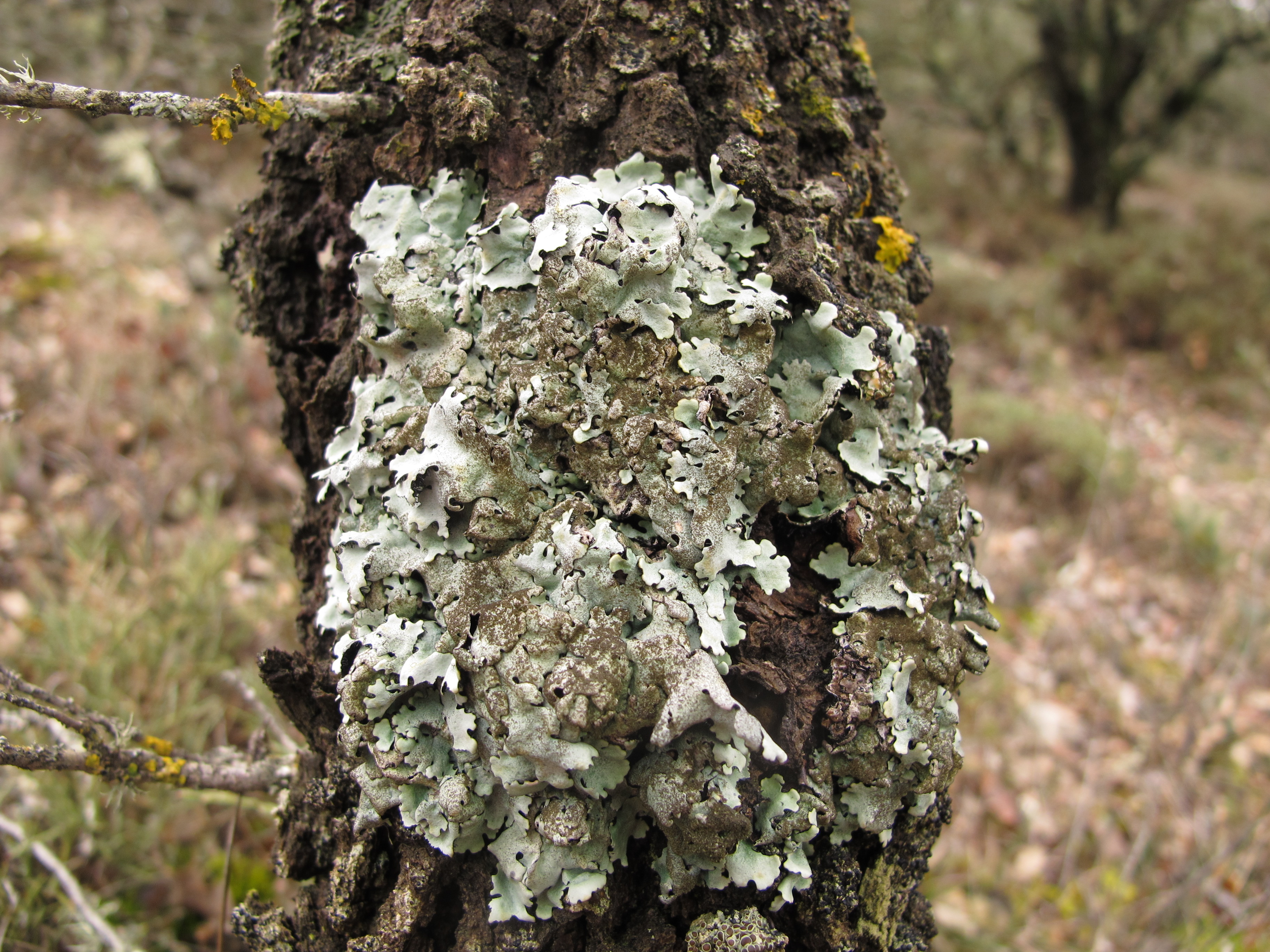

Scientific classification
- Kingdom: Fungi
- Division: Ascomycota
- Class: Lecanoromycetes
- Order: Lecanorales
- Family: Parmeliaceae
- Genus: Parmelina
- Species: P. tiliacea

Binomial name
- Parmelina tiliacea (Hoffm.) Hale (1974)

Synonyms
- Lichen tiliaceus Hoffm. (1784) (basionym)

= Parmelina tiliacea =

Species of lichen-forming fungus

Parmelina tiliacea is a species of lichen belonging to the family Parmeliaceae.

It has a cosmopolitan distribution. In Nepal, Parmelina tiliacea has been reported at 2,100 m elevation in a compilation of published records.
