= Rhopalophora clavispora =

Scientific classification
- Kingdom: Fungi
- Division: Ascomycota
- Class: Eurotiomycetes
- Order: Sclerococcales
- Family: Dactylosporaceae
- Genus: Rhopalophora; Réblová, Unter. & W.Gams, 2016
- Species: R. clavispora

Binomial name
- Rhopalophora clavispora (W.Gams) Réblová, Unter. & W. Gams, 2016

Synonyms
- Phialophora clavispora W.Gams, 1976

Species of lichen-like fungus

Rhopalophora (from Greek ῥόπαλον (rhópalon) 'club' and -φόρος (-phóros) 'bearing') is a genus of lichen-like fungus in the family Dactylosporaceae. It contains the sole species R. clavispora, previously belonging to the genus Phialophora but redescribed in 2016 to compose this monotypic genus.

== Description ==
Members of Rhopalophora are lignicolous fungi of mycelium made of hyaline or pigmented hyphae that are occasionally monilioid. They have no conidiomata. Their conidiophores are pale brown in color, unbranched, macronematous (i.e. morphologically different from vegetative hyphae), often reduced to phialides generated directly from undifferentiated hyphae, sometimes with percurrent regeneration. Phialides are light brown in color, paler towards the tip, integrated, subcylindrical and sometimes with sympodial proliferation, tapering toward the collarette. The conidia are hyaline, aseptate, clavate, truncate at the base, and arranged in chains or heads.

The sexual morph of this genus is unknown.

== Taxonomy ==
The genus Rhopalophora was described in 2016 by Martina Réblová, Wendy A. Untereiner & Walter Gams to accommodate the species R. clavispora, which was initially described in 1976 by the same Walter Gams as a member of Phialophora. The separation was due to a phylogenetic analysis revealing Phialophora clavispora to be more related to other fungal members of Sclerococcaceae than to Phialophora.
