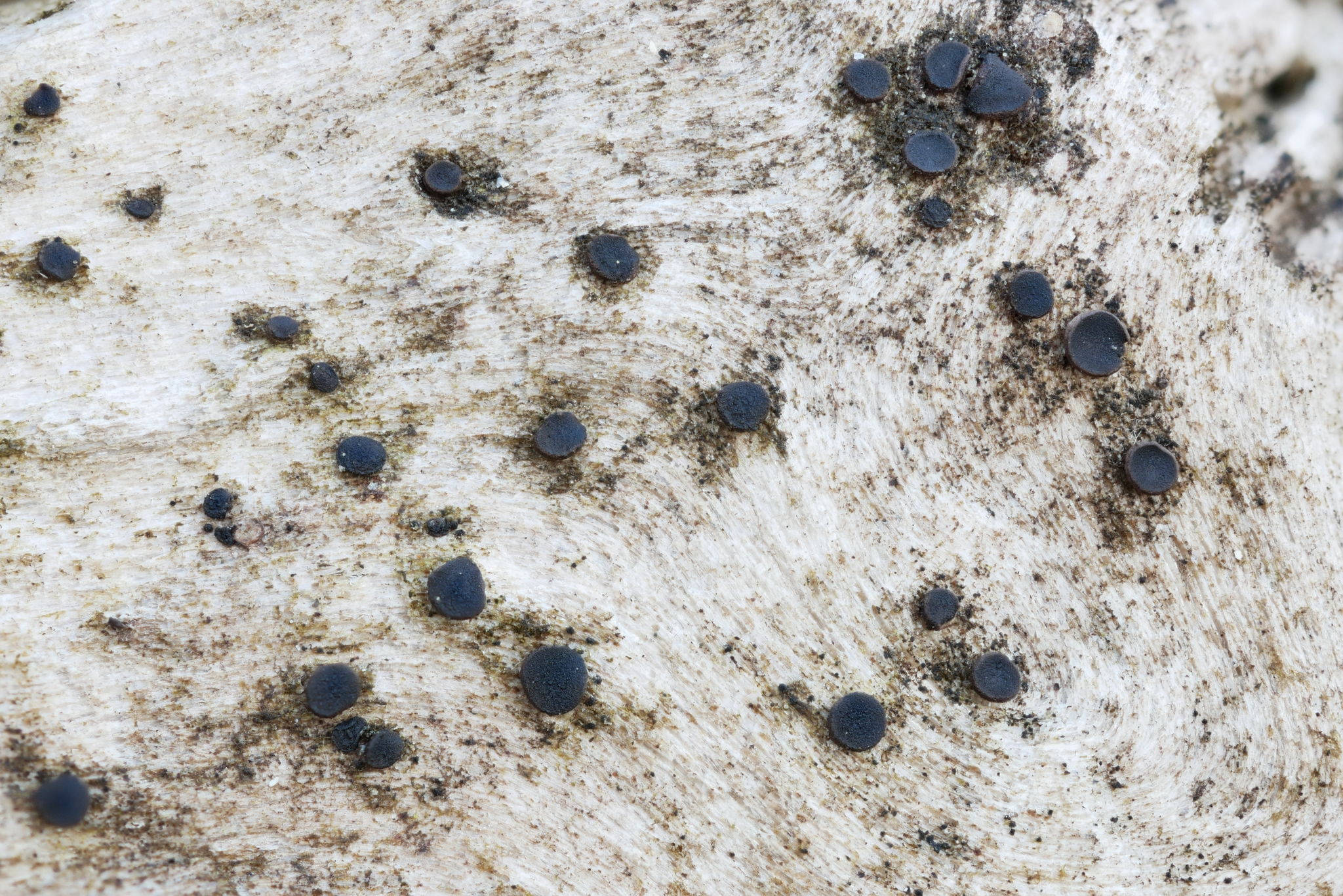
- Sclerococcum stygium

Scientific classification
- Kingdom: Fungi
- Division: Ascomycota
- Class: Eurotiomycetes
- Subclass: Sclerococcomycetidae; Réblová, Unter. & W.Gams (2016)
- Order: Sclerococcales; Réblová, Unter. & W.Gams (2016)
- Family: Dactylosporaceae; Bellem. & Hafellner (1982)

Type genus
- Dactylospora Körb. (1855)

Genera
- Cylindroconidiis; Fusichalara; Gamsomyces; Longimultiseptata; Pseudobactrodesmium; Rhopalophora; Sclerococcum

Synonyms
- Sclerococcaceae Réblová, Unter. & W.Gams (2016)

= Dactylosporaceae =

Family of lichen-forming fungi

The Dactylosporaceae or Sclerococcaceae are a family of lichen-forming fungi in the class Eurotiomycetes. It is the only family of the order Sclerococcales and subclass Sclerococcomycetidae.

== Taxonomy ==
There are currently seven genera in the family:

- Cylindroconidiis H.Zhang & X.D.Yu (2018) – 1 species
- Fusichalara S.Hughes & Nag Raj (1973) – 5 species
- Gamsomyces Hern.-Restr. & Réblová (2020) – 1 species
- Longimultiseptata H.Zhang & W.Dong (2019) – 2 species
- Pseudobactrodesmium H.Zhang, W.Dong & K.D.Hyde (2020) – 3 species
- Rhopalophora Réblová, Unter. & W.Gams (2016) – 1 species
- Sclerococcum Fr. (1825) (=Dactylospora Körb. (1855), the type genus) – around 100 species
