= Paul Diederich =

Luxembourgish mycologist and mathematics teacher (born 1959)

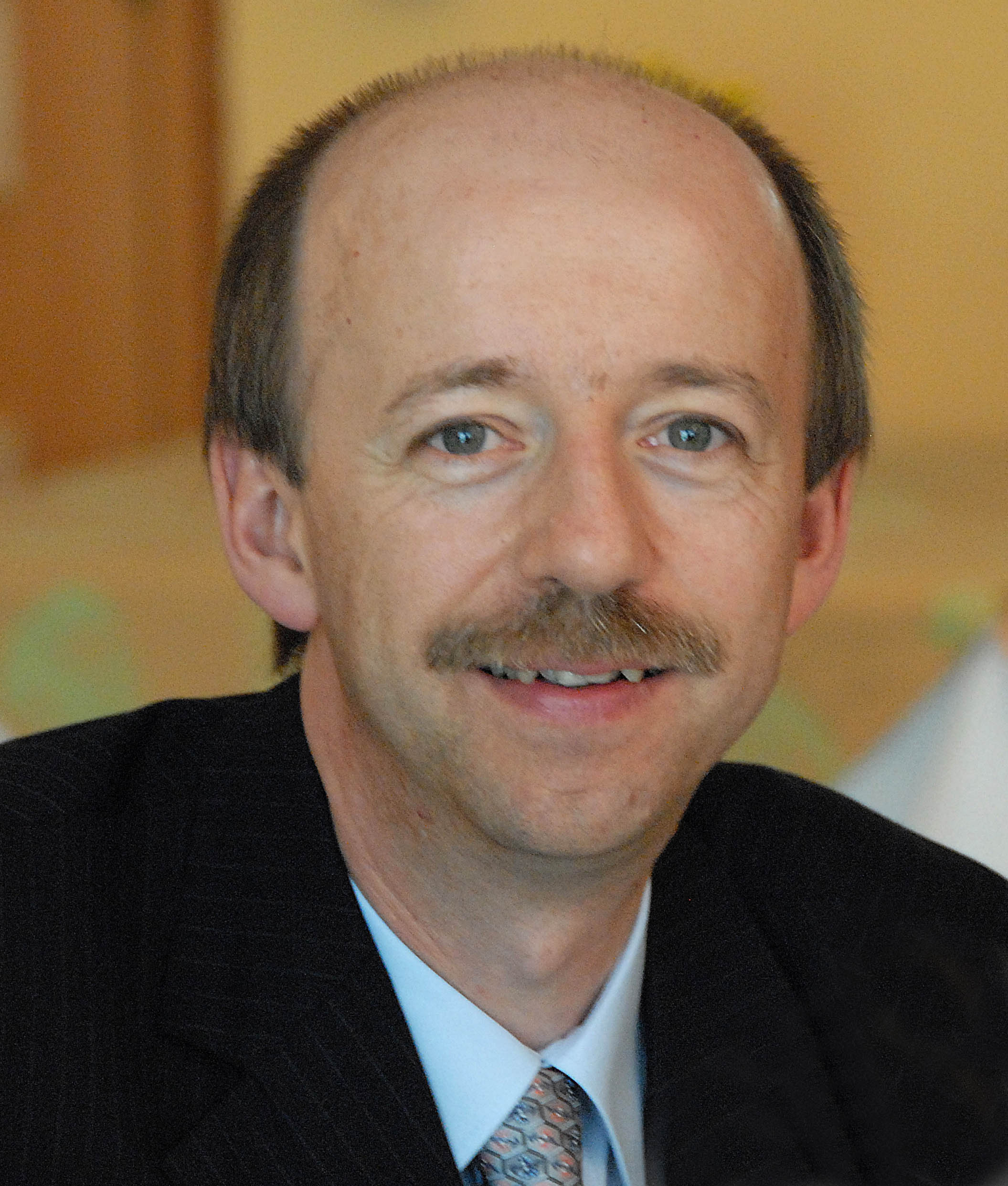
- Diederich in 2006
- Born: May 4, 1959 (age 67); Luxembourg City, Luxembourg
- Education: University of Louvain
- Scientific career
- Fields: Mycology
- Workplaces: National Museum of Natural History, Luxembourg; École de Commerce et de Gestion, Luxembourg
- Author abbrev. (botany): Diederich

Paul Diederich (born 4 May 1959) is a Luxembourgish mathematics teacher and mycologist who specialises in lichenicolous fungi (fungi that live on lichens). Since 1986 he has taught mathematics at the École de Commerce et de Gestion in Luxembourg, and from 1989 to 2008 he served as a research associate at the country's National Museum of Natural History. He has authored more than 190 publications, including major monographs and collaborative volumes, and his work has been recognised with awards such as the Van Rompaey Award (1991) and the Tuckerman Award (2004 and 2019).

== Career and research ==
Diederich studied mathematics at the Université libre de Bruxelles from 1979 to 1983, earning a licence en mathématiques. He then undertook teacher training (1983–1986), studied computer science at the University of Liège in 1986–1987, and completed a doctorate in botany in 1989 at the Université catholique de Louvain. His thesis treated the taxonomy, ecology and biogeography of Luxembourg's epiphytic lichens and their lichenicolous fungi (excluding macrolichens). Since 1986 he has taught mathematics at the École de Commerce et de Gestion in Luxembourg, and since 1989 he has collaborated with the National Museum of Natural History; he was a research associate there from 1989 to 2008. He has been active in the Société des naturalistes luxembourgeois since 1974, joined its committee in 1985, and has served on the editorial committee (including page layout) for the society's bulletin.

His research focuses on lichenicolous fungi. He has produced more than 190 publications, including a monograph on the lichenicolous heterobasidiomycetes (1996). His fieldwork spans Belgium, Luxembourg and northern France as well as Papua New Guinea, and he has described more than 200 new species, several new genera, and proposed two new orders, Lichenoconiales and Lichenostigmatales. He contributed editorially to volume 2 of Lichen Flora of the Greater Sonoran Desert Region (2004) and co-authored a checklist of the lichens and lichenicolous fungi of Belgium and Luxembourg (2000). He also co-created and maintains widely used online databases: the regional checklist "The lichens and lichenicolous fungi of Belgium, Luxembourg and northern France" (lichenology.info) and the global "Lichenicolous fungi – worldwide checklist" (lichenicolous.net).

== Honours and recognition ==
As a school student he won first prize in Luxembourg's Réalisations Jeunes scientifiques (1978) for a bioindicator-based air-pollution map, and the following year received a distinction at the 11th European Philips Contest for Young Scientists and Inventors in Oslo (1979); he later published the project in the SNL bulletin. He was awarded the Van Rompaey Award in 1991 for the best recent botanical publication in Belgium and Luxembourg, and has twice (2004 and 2019) received the Tuckerman Award for the best paper published in the academic journal The Bryologist.

Taxa named in his honour include the genera Diederichia, Diederimyces, and Diederichomyces, and several species: Strigula diederichiana Etayo, Cl.Roux & Sérus. (1993); Byssoloma diederichii Sérus. (1998); Taeniolella diederichiana Etayo & Calat. (2005); Zwackhiomyces diederichii D.Hawksw. & Iturr (2006); Relicina diederichii Elix (2007); Enterographa diederichiana Ertz (2009); Endohyalina diederichii Giralt, Van den Boom & Elix (2010); Tremella diederichiana Pérez-Ortega, Millanes, V.J.Rico & J.C.Zamora (2016); Capronia diederichiana Pinault & Cl.Roux (2020); and Abrothallus diederichii Suija & F.Berger (2024).

== Selected publications ==
His output includes regional monographs (e.g. Luxembourg epiphytic lichens and their lichenicolous fungi, 268 pp., 1989), a world monograph (The lichenicolous heterobasidiomycetes, 1996), major collaborative volumes (Sonoran Desert Lichen Flora vol. 2, 2004), and phylogenetic papers ranging to broad fungal lineages (including a six-gene phylogeny in Nature, 2006).

- Lawrey, James D.; Diederich, Paul (2003). "Lichenicolous fungi: interactions, evolution, and biodiversity". The Bryologist. 106 (1): 80–120. doi:10.1639/0007-2745(2003)106[0080:LFIEAB]2.0.CO;2.
- Diederich, Paul; Lawrey, James D.; Ertz, Damien (2018). "The 2018 classification and checklist of lichenicolous fungi, with 2000 non-lichenized, obligately lichenicolous taxa". The Bryologist. 121 (3): 340–425. doi:10.1639/0007-2745-121.3.340.
- Diederich, Paul; Millanes, Ana M.; Wedin, Mats; Lawrey, James D. (20 August 2022). Flora of Lichenicolous Fungi. Basidiomycota (PDF). Vol. 1. Luxembourg: National Museum of Natural History. pp. 1–351. ISBN 978-2-919877-26-3. Archived from the original (PDF) on 20 November 2024.

== See also ==
- Category:Taxa named by Paul Diederich
