= Outline of lichens =

Symbiosis of fungi with algae or cyanobacteria

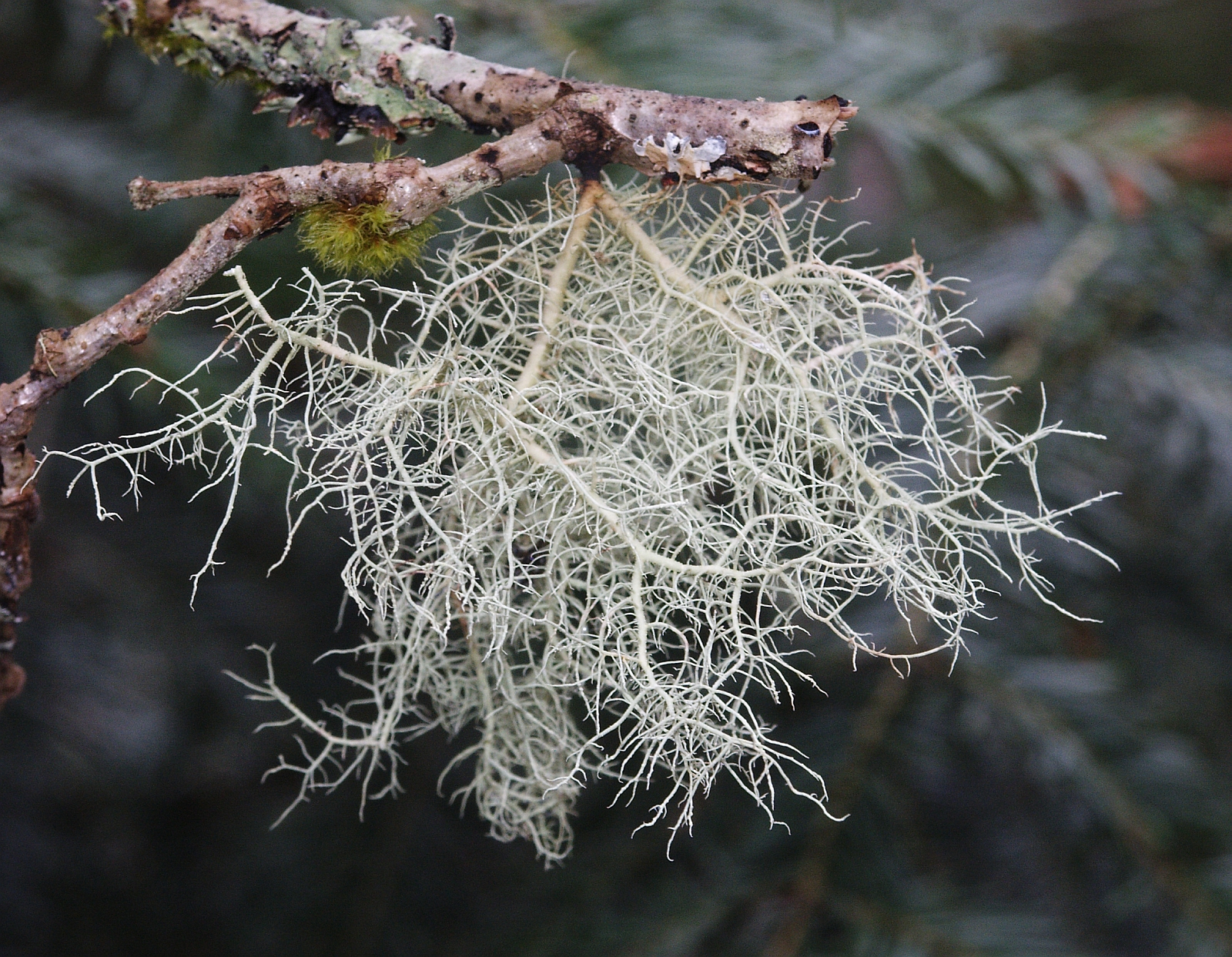
Usnea filipendula – one of about 20,000 described species of lichen

The following outline provides an overview of and topical guide to lichens.

Lichens are composite organisms made up of multiple species. They comprise a fungal partner, one or more photosynthetic partners, which can be either green algae or cyanobacteria, and, in at least 52 genera of lichens, a yeast. In American English, "lichen" is pronounced the same as the verb "liken" (/ˈlaɪkən/). In British English, both this pronunciation and one rhyming with "kitchen" (/ˈlɪtʃən/) are used.

== Descriptions of lichens ==
A lichen can be described as all of the following:

- Life form – an entity that is alive.

- Composite organism – a symbiotic life form composed of multiple partners from different biological domains, families and kingdoms, and from different phyla, classes and divisions within those domains and kingdoms. In the case of lichens, a fungal partner (the mycobiont) combines with one or more photosynthetic partner(s) (the photobiont) as well as (in some cases) a yeast.

- Eukaryote (domain) – organisms with a cell nucleus within a nuclear envelope; both the mycobiont and any algal partners fall into this domain.

- Fungi (kingdom) – the fungal partner and any yeast partner fall into this kingdom.

- Ascomycota (phylum) and/or Basidiomycota (phylum)

- For the biological classes and families these fungi belong to, see below.

- Chlorophyta (division) – if the photobiont is a green alga, it falls into this taxonomic division.

- Trebouxiophyceae (class)

- Trebouxiaceae (family)

- Ulvophyceae (class)

- Trentepohliaceae (family)

- Prokaryote (domain) – organisms without a cell nucleus; any cyanobacterial partner falls into this domain.

- Bacteria (domain)

- Cyanobacteria (phylum)

== Nature of lichens ==
Schematic cross section of foliose lichen: (a) The cortex is the outer layer of tightly woven fungal filaments (hyphae) (b) This photobiont layer has photosynthesizing green algae (c) Loosely packed hyphae in the medulla (d) A tightly woven lower cortex (e) Anchoring hyphae called rhizines, where the fungus attaches to the substrate

=== Morphology ===
- Lichen anatomy and physiology

- Apoplast – the symbiotic interface zone between the mycobiont and photobiont, outside the cell membranes or walls of both.
- Haustorium (pl. haustoria) – a root-like structure which allows the fungal partner to extract nutrients from its photosynthetic partner(s).

- Lichen morphology – a lichen's external appearance and structures are very different than those of its individual partners.

- Ascocarp – the fruiting body of a lichen, which contains the asci.

- Ascus (pl. asci) – a sexual, fungal spore-bearing structure, typically sac-like in shape.
- Ascospore – a fungal spore, the product of meiosis, produced in an ascus.

- Epispore – a transparent bag-like outer covering on some spores, which helps to determine spore shape.

- Cephalodium (pl. cephalodia) – a gall-like structure that contains cyanobacteria
- Hypha (pl. hyphae) – a long, branching, thread-like structure composed of one or more fungal cells, which typically makes up a large part of lichens; hyphae are densely compacted in the cortex and more loosely interwoven in the medulla.
- Pycnidium (pl. pycnidia) – a flask-shaped, asexual fruiting body possessed by some lichens.

- Conidium (pl. conidia) – an asexual fungal spore produced in pycnidia by some lichens.

- Rhizine – a root-like structure that anchors a lichen to the substrate on which it grows.
- Soralium (pl. soralia) – a localized region or structure, typically a crack or pore, containing soredium.

- Soredium (pl. soredia) – asexual reproductive propagules composed of loose clumps of fungal hyphae and photobiont cells, produced in soralia.

- Thallus (pl. thalli) – the vegetative body of a lichen, made up of both mycobiont and photobiont components.

- Cortex – the lichen's outer layer(s), made up of tightly woven fungal filaments.
- Isidium (pl. isidia) – outgrowths of the thallus which contain photobiont cells and provide means of vegetative reproduction for some lichens.
- Medulla – a loose layer of interwoven fungal hyphae within the thallus.
- Podetium (pl. podetia) – an upright secondary thallus, which supports the fruiting bodies of Cladonia species.

=== Ecology ===
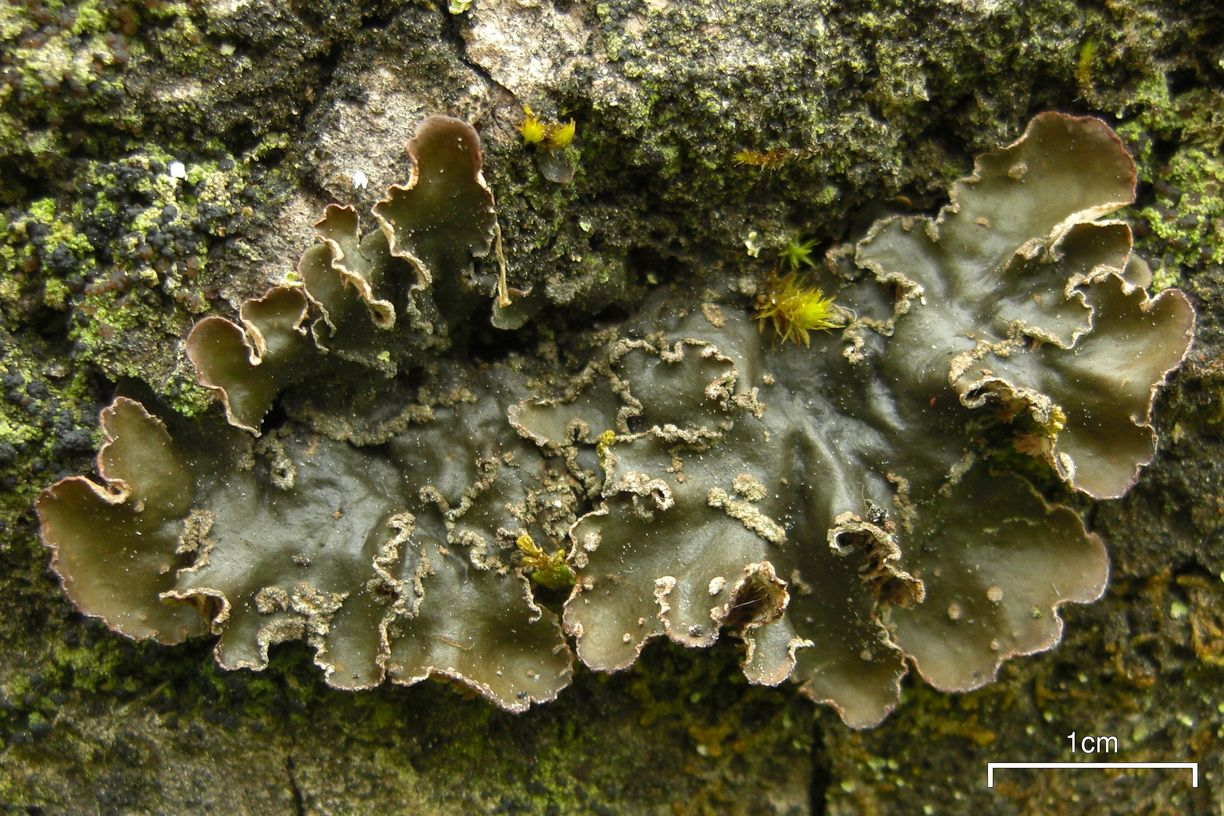
Lichens with a cyanobacteria as the photosynthetic partner, like this Peltigera collina, can fix nitrogen.

- Symbiosis in lichens – the relationship between the lichen partners can be complicated; while generally mutualistic, sometimes it is not. Recent research also shows other partners, including bacteria and "accessory" fungi, may be involved.
- Asexual reproduction in lichens – many lichens reproduce asexually, using one or more of various methods which allow the dispersal of bundles of both fungal hyphae and photobionts.
- Sexual reproduction in lichens – most lichens reproduce sexually using ascospores, which means they have to acquire their photobiont partners somehow after germinating.
- Lichens and nitrogen cycling – some lichens (in particular those with cyanobacteria as a photobiont) can fix nitrogen.
- Lichen biogeography – the study of the current distribution of extant lichens and the reasons for those distributions.
- Lichen resynthesis – lichens can be artificially "recreated" by combining partners in a lab.
- Lichens and pedogenesis – lichens contribute to the formation of soil by breaking down rock.
  - Biological soil crust – lichens are among the common dominant biota in biocrusts, one of the world's largest environmental community types in terms of area covered.
- Photosynthesis in lichens

== Types of lichens ==
=== Lichen taxonomical classifications ===
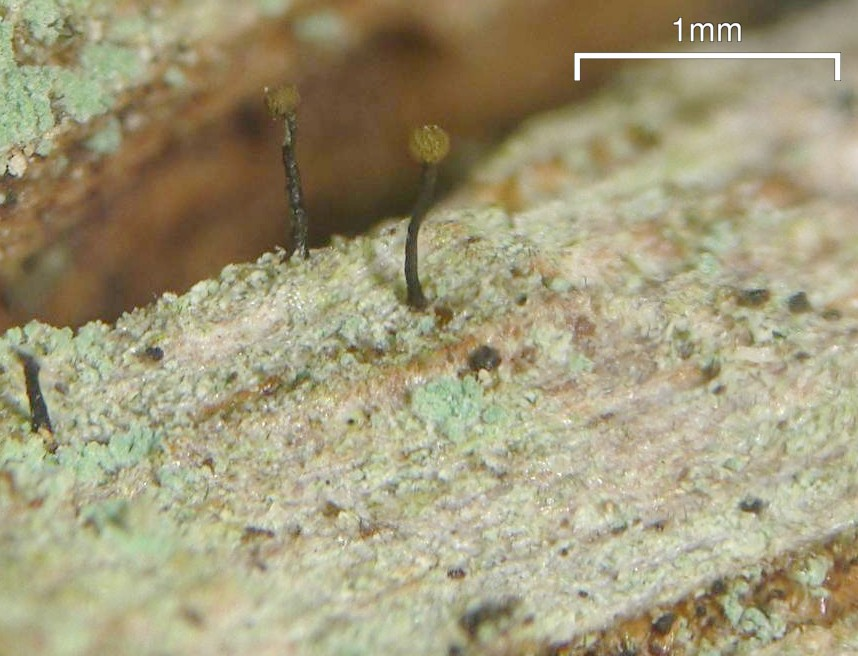
Chaenotheca brunneola falls into Coniocybomycetes, a small fungal class which contains only a handful of lichen species.

Lichen systematics – Although they are composite organisms, lichens have traditionally been classified on the basis of their fungal partner. These span eight different biological classes, 39 orders, 117 families, and around 1,000 genera.

- Ascolichen – a lichen whose fungal partner is a member of the Ascomycota, one of the two main fungal divisions.
- Basidiolichen – a lichen whose fungal partner is a member of the Basidiomycota, the other of the two main fungal divisions; these are far fewer in occurrence than ascolichens.

==== Classes ====
Lichens fall into eight fungal classes and several subclasses:

1. Agaricomycetes
  1. Agaricomycetidae
2. Arthoniomycetes
3. Coniocybomycetes
4. Dothideomycetes
  1. Dothideomycetidae
5. Eurotiomycetes
  1. Chaetothyriomycetidae
6. Lecanoromycetes
  1. Acarosporomycetidae
  2. Lecanoromycetidae
  3. Ostropomycetidae
7. Lichinomycetes
8. Sordariomycetes
  1. Sordariomycetidae

==== Orders ====
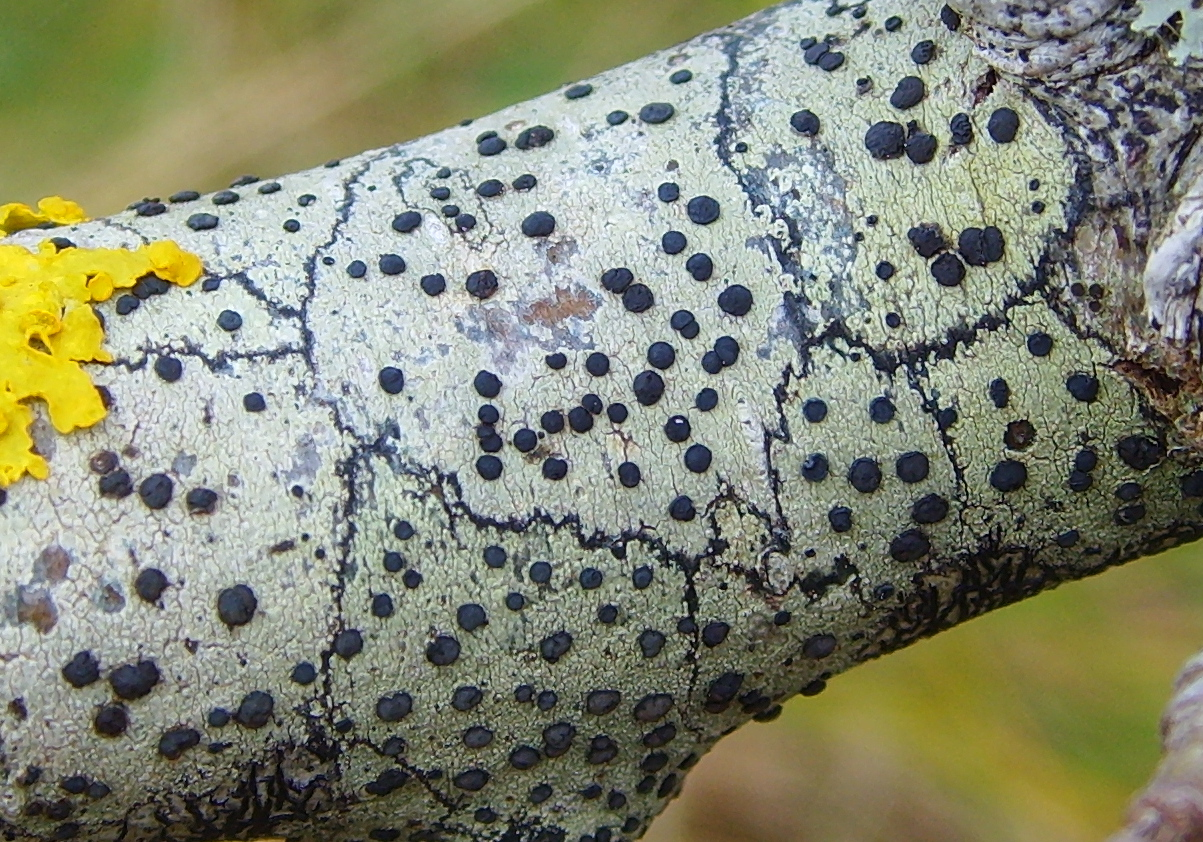
Lecidella elaeochroma is a member of Lecanorales, the fungal order which contains the greatest number of lichen species.

They are split across nearly 40 orders. Those which cannot be assigned to a particular order are assigned instead to "incertae sedis" within the appropriate class. These orders were listed in Lücking, Hodkinson and Leavitt's 2016 treatise on the classification of lichenized fungi, except where otherwise noted, with orders updated in 2021.

1. Acarosporales
2. Agaricales
3. Arthoniales
4. Atheliales
5. Baeomycetales
6. Caliciales
7. Candelariales
8. Cantharellales
9. Capnodiales
10. Chaetothyriales
11. Collemopsidiales
12. Coniocybales
13. Corticiales
14. Eremithallales
15. Lecanorales
16. Lecideales
17. Lepidostromatales
18. Leprocaulales
19. Lichinales
20. Monoblastiales
21. Odontotrematales
22. Ostropales
23. Peltigerales
24. Pertusariales
25. Phaeomoniellales
26. Pleosporales
27. Pyrenulales
28. Rhizocarpales
29. Sarrameanales
30. Schaereriales
31. Strigulales
32. Teloschistales
33. Thelenellales
34. Thelocarpales
35. Trypetheliales
36. Umbilicariales
37. Verrucariales
38. Vezdaeales
39. Xylariales

==== Families ====
They fall into 117 families. Those which cannot be assigned to a particular family are assigned instead to "incertae sedis" within the appropriate order. These were listed in Lücking, Hodkinson and Leavitt's 2016 treatise on the classification of lichenized fungi, except where otherwise noted; families were updated in 2021.

1. Acarosporaceae
2. Agyriaceae
3. Andreiomycetaceae
4. Aphanopsidaceae
5. Arctomiaceae
6. Arthoniaceae
7. Arthrorhaphidaceae
8. Atheliaceae
9. Baeomycetaceae
10. Biatorellaceae
11. Brigantiaeaceae
12. Caliciaceae
13. Cameroniaceae
14. Candelariaceae
15. Carbonicolaceae
16. Catillariaceae
17. Celotheliaceae
18. Chrysotrichaceae
19. Cladoniaceae
20. Clavulinaceae
21. Coccocarpiaceae
22. Coccotremataceae
23. Coenogoniaceae
24. Collemataceae
25. Coniocybaceae
26. Corticiaceae
27. Cystocoleaceae
28. Dacampiaceae
29. Dactylosporaceae
30. Ectolechiaceae
31. Elixiaceae
32. Fuscideaceae
33. Gloeoheppiaceae
34. Gomphillaceae
35. Graphidaceae
36. Gyalectaceae
37. Gypsoplacaceae
38. Haematommataceae
39. Harpidiaceae
40. Helocarpaceae
41. Hygrophoraceae
42. Hymeneliaceae
43. Icmadophilaceae
44. Koerberiaceae
45. Lecanographaceae
46. Lecanoraceae
47. Lecideaceae
48. Lepidostromataceae
49. Leprocaulaceae
50. Letrouitiaceae
51. Lichinaceae
52. Lopadiaceae
53. Lyrommataceae
54. Malmideaceae
55. Massalongiaceae
56. Megalariaceae
57. Megalosporaceae
58. Megasporaceae
59. Melaspileaceae
60. Microtheliopsidaceae
61. Monoblastiaceae
62. Mycoporaceae
63. Nephromataceae
64. Ochrolechiaceae
65. Opegraphaceae
66. Ophioparmaceae
67. Pachyascaceae
68. Pannariaceae
69. Parmeliaceae
70. Peltigeraceae
71. Peltulaceae
72. Pertusariaceae
73. Phaneromycetaceae
74. Phlyctidaceae
75. Physciaceae
76. Placynthiaceae
77. Porinaceae
78. Protothelenellaceae
79. Psilolechiaceae
80. Psoraceae
81. Pycnoraceae
82. Pyrenotrichaceae
83. Pyrenulaceae
84. Ramalinaceae
85. Ramboldiaceae
86. Redonographaceae
87. Requienellaceae
88. Rhizocarpaceae
89. Roccellaceae
90. Roccellographaceae
91. Ropalosporaceae
92. Sagiolechiaceae
93. Sarrameanaceae
94. Schaereriaceae
95. Scoliciosporaceae
96. Sphaerophoraceae
97. Sporastatiaceae
98. Stereocaulaceae
99. Stictidaceae
100. Strangosporaceae
101. Strigulaceae
102. Teloschistaceae
103. Tenuitholiascaceae
104. Tephromelataceae
105. Thelenellaceae
106. Thelocarpaceae
107. Trapeliaceae
108. Trichosphaeriaceae
109. Trypetheliaceae
110. Umbilicariaceae
111. Vahliellaceae
112. Varicellariaceae
113. Verrucariaceae
114. Vezdaeaceae
115. Xanthopyreniaceae
116. Xylographaceae

==== Genera ====
- List of common names of lichen genera

Extant lichens are found in more than 1000 genera. These were listed in Lücking, Hodkinson and Leavitt's 2016 treatise on the classification of lichenized fungi, except where otherwise noted.

1. Absconditella
2. Acantholichen
3. Acanthothecis
4. Acanthotrema
5. Acarospora
6. Aciculopsora
7. Acolium
8. Acrocordia
9. Acroscyphus
10. Actinoplaca
11. Adelolecia
12. Aderkomyces
13. Aggregatorygma
14. Agonimia
15. Ahtiana
16. Ainoa
17. Albemarlea
18. Alectoria
19. Allantoparmelia
20. Allocalicium
21. Allocetraria
22. Allographa
23. Allophoron
24. Alyxoria
25. Amandinea
26. Amazonomyces
27. Amazonotrema
28. Ameliella
29. Amphorothecium
30. Ampliotrema
31. Amundsenia
32. Amygdalaria
33. Amylora
34. Anamylopsora
35. Anaptychia
36. Ancistrosporella
37. Andreiomyces
38. Anema
39. Angiactis
40. Anisomeridium
41. Anomalographis
42. Anomomorpha
43. Antennulariella
44. Anthracocarpon
45. Anthracothecium
46. Anzia
47. Anzina
48. Apatoplaca
49. Aphanopsis
50. Aplanocalenia
51. Aptrootia
52. Aquacidia
53. Architrypethelium
54. Arctocetraria
55. Arctomia
56. Arctoparmelia
57. Argopsis
58. Aridoplaca
59. Arrhenia
60. Arthonia (list)
61. Arthopyrenia
62. Arthotheliopsis
63. Arthothelium
64. Arthrorhaphis
65. Asahinea
66. Aspicilia
67. Aspiciliella
68. Aspiciliopsis
69. Aspidothelium
70. Aspilidea
71. Asteristion
72. Asteroporum
73. Asterothyrium
74. Astrochapsa
75. Astrothelium
76. Athallia
77. Athelopsis
78. Atla
79. Atrophysma
80. Aulaxina
81. Auriculora
82. Australiaena
83. Australidea
84. Austrella
85. Austrographa
86. Austrolecia
87. Austromelanelixia
88. Austroparmeliella
89. Austroparmelina
90. Austropeltum
91. Austroplaca
92. Austroroccella
93. Austrotrema
94. Awasthia
95. Awasthiella
96. Bacidia
97. Bacidina
98. Bacidiopsora
99. Bactrospora
100. Baculifera
101. Badimia
102. Badimiella
103. Baeomyces
104. Baflavia
105. Bagliettoa
106. Bahianora
107. Baidera
108. Bapalmuia
109. Bartlettiella
110. Barubria
111. Bathelium
112. Bellemerea
113. Biatora
114. Biatorella
115. Biatoridium
116. Bibbya
117. Bilimbia
118. Blastenia
119. Blastodesmia
120. Blennothallia
121. Bogoriella
122. Boreoplaca
123. Borinquenotrema
124. Botryolepraria
125. Bouvetiella
126. Brasilicia
127. Brianaria
128. Brigantiaea
129. Brodoa
130. Brownliella
131. Bryobilimbia
132. Bryocaulon
133. Bryodina
134. Bryogomphus
135. Bryonora
136. Bryoplaca
137. Bryoria
138. Bryostigma
139. Buellia (list)
140. Buelliastrum
141. Bulbothrix
142. Bunodophoron
143. Burrowsia
144. Byssolecania
145. Byssoloma
146. Byssotrema
147. Caeruleum
148. Calathaspis
149. Calenia
150. Caleniopsis
151. Calicium
152. Callome
153. Calogaya
154. Calopadia
155. Calopadiopsis
156. Caloplaca (list)
157. Calotrichopsis
158. Calvitimela
159. Calycidium
160. Cameronia
161. Candelaria
162. Candelariella
163. Candelina
164. Canoparmelia
165. Caprettia
166. Carassea
167. Carbacanthographis
168. Carbonicola
169. Catapyrenium
170. Catarrhospora
171. Catarraphia
172. Catenarina
173. Catillaria
174. Catillochroma
175. Catinaria
176. Catolechia
177. Cecidonia
178. Celothelium
179. Cenozosia
180. Cephalophysis
181. Cerothallia
182. Cetradonia
183. Cetraria
184. Cetrariella
185. Cetrelia
186. Cetreliopsis
187. Chaenotheca
188. Chapsa
189. Charcotiana
190. Cheiromycina
191. Chiodecton
192. Chrismofulvea
193. Chromatochlamys
194. Chroodiscus
195. Chrysothrix
196. Cinnabaria
197. Ciposia
198. Circinaria
199. Cladia
200. Cladidium
201. Cladocetraria
202. Claurouxia
203. Cladonia (list)
204. Clandestinotrema
205. Clathroporina
206. Clauzadea
207. Clauzadeana
208. Clauzadella
209. Clavascidium
210. Cliostomum
211. Clypeopyrenis
212. Coccocarpia
213. Coccotrema
214. Coelopogon
215. Coenogonium
216. Collema
217. Collemopsidium
218. Combea
219. Compositrema
220. Compsocladium
221. Coniangium
222. Coniarthonia
223. Coniocarpon
224. Conotremopsis
225. Constrictolumina
226. Coppinsia
227. Coppinsidea
228. Cora
229. Corella
230. Coronoplectrum
231. Cornicularia
232. Corticorygma
233. Coscinocladium
234. Cratiria
235. Creographa
236. Crespoa
237. Cresponea
238. Cresporhaphis
239. Crocellina
240. Crocodia
241. Crocynia
242. Cruentotrema
243. Crustospathula
244. Crutarndina
245. Cryptodiscus
246. Crypthonia
247. Cryptophaea
248. Cryptothecia
249. Cryptothele
250. Culbersonia
251. Cyanoporina
252. Cyphelium
253. Cyphellostereum
254. Cystocoleus
255. Dacampia
256. Dactylina
257. Davidgallowaya
258. Degelia
259. Dendriscosticta
260. Dendrographa
261. Dermatiscum
262. Dermatocarpon
263. Dermiscellum
264. Diaphorographis
265. Dibaeis
266. Dichosporidium
267. Dictyocatenulata
268. Dictyographa
269. Dictyomeridium
270. Dictyonema
271. Digitothyrea
272. Dijigiella
273. Dimelaena
274. Dimidiographa
275. Diorygma
276. Diploicia
277. Diploschistella
278. Diploschistes
279. Diplotomma
280. Dirinaria
281. Dirina
282. Dirinastrum
283. Diromma
284. Distopyrenis
285. Dolichocarpus
286. Dolichousnea
287. Ducatina
288. Dufourea
289. Dyplolabia
290. Echidnocymbium
291. Echinoplaca
292. Edrudia
293. Edwardiella
294. Eiglera
295. Eilifdahlia
296. Elixia
297. Elixjohnia
298. Emmanuelia
299. Emodomelanelia
300. Encephalographa
301. Enchylium
302. Endocarpon
303. Endocena
304. Endohyalina
305. Enterodictyon
306. Enterographa
307. Epilichen
308. Enigmotrema
309. Eopyrenula
310. Ephebe
311. Eremastrella
312. Eremithallus
313. Eremothecella
314. Erinacellus
315. Erioderma
316. Ertzia
317. Erythrodecton
318. Eschatogonia
319. Esslingeriana
320. Eugeniella
321. Eumitria
322. Euopsis
323. Evernia
324. Everniopsis
325. Farnoldia
326. Fauriea
327. Feigeana
328. Felipes
329. Fellhanera
330. Fellhaneropsis
331. Ferraroa
332. Fibrillithecis
333. Filsoniana
334. Finkia
335. Fissurina
336. Flabelloporina
337. Flakea
338. Flavobathelium
339. Flavocetraria
340. Flavoparmelia
341. Flavoplaca
342. Flavopunctelia
343. Fluctua
344. Follmannia
345. Follmanniella
346. Fominiella
347. Fouragea
348. Franwilsia
349. Frigidopyrenia
350. Frutidella
351. Fulgidea
352. Fulvophyton
353. Fuscidea
354. Fuscoderma
355. Fuscopannaria
356. Gabura
357. Gassicurtia
358. Gibbosporina
359. Gintarasia
360. Gintarasiella
361. Glaucotrema
362. Gloeoheppia
363. Glomerilla
364. Glomerulophoron
365. Glyphis
366. Glypholecia
367. Glyphopeltis
368. Glyphopsis
369. Gomphillus
370. Gondwania
371. Gorgadesia
372. Gossypiothallon
373. Gowardia
374. Granulopyrenis
375. Graphidastra
376. Graphis
377. Gregorella
378. Gudelia
379. Gyalecta
380. Gyalectaria
381. Gyalectidium
382. Gyalidea
383. Gyalideopsis
384. Gyalolechia
385. Gymnoderma
386. Gymnographa
387. Gymnographopsis
388. Gyrocollema
389. Gyrographa
390. Gyronactis
391. Gyrotrema
392. Haematomma
393. Halecania
394. Halegrapha
395. Halographis
396. Haloplaca
397. Hanstrassia
398. Haplodina
399. Haploloma
400. Harpidium
401. Harusavskia
402. Heiomasia
403. Helicobolomyces
404. Helminthocarpon
405. Helocarpon
406. Hemithecium
407. Henrica
408. Heppia
409. Heppsora
410. Herpothallon
411. Hertella
412. Herteliana
413. Hertelidea
414. Heterocarpon
415. Heterocyphelium
416. Heterodermia
417. Heteromyces
418. Heteroplacidium
419. Himantormia
420. Hippocrepidea
421. Homothecium
422. Hormosphaeria
423. Hosseusia
424. Hosseusiella
425. Huea
426. Hueidea
427. Huneckia
428. Hydropunctaria
429. Hymenelia
430. Hyperphyscia
431. Hypocenomyce
432. Hypoflavia
433. Hypogymnia
434. Hypotrachyna
435. Icmadophila
436. Igneoplaca
437. Ikaeria
438. Immersaria
439. Imshaugia
440. Ingaderia
441. Ingvariella
442. Inoderma
443. Involucropyrenium
444. Ionaspis
445. Ioplaca
446. Isalonactis
447. Jamesiella
448. Japewia
449. Japewiella
450. Jarmania
451. Jasonhuria
452. Jenmania
453. Joergensenia
454. Josefpoeltia
455. Julella
456. Kaernefeltia
457. Kaernefia
458. Kalbiana
459. Kalbionora
460. Kalbographa
461. Kashiwadia
462. Kantvilasia
463. Klauskalbia
464. Knightiella
465. Koerberia
466. Koerberiella
467. Krogia
468. Kroswia
469. Kuettlingeria
470. Kurokawia
471. Lambiella
472. Lasallia
473. Lasioloma
474. Lathagrium
475. Lazarenkoella
476. Lecanactis
477. Lecania
478. Lecanographa
479. Lecanora (list)
480. Lecidea (list)
481. Lecidella
482. Lecidoma
483. Lecidopyrenopsis
484. Leciophysma
485. Leifidium
486. Leightoniella
487. Leimonis
488. Leioderma
489. Leiorreuma
490. Lemmopsis
491. Lempholemma
492. Lendemeriella
493. Lepidocollema
494. Lepidostroma
495. Lepra
496. Leprantha
497. Lepraria
498. Leprocaulon
499. Leprocollema
500. Leproplaca
501. Leptochidium
502. Leptogidium
503. Leptogium
504. Leptorhaphis
505. Leptotrema
506. Letharia
507. Lethariella
508. Letrouitia
509. Leucodecton
510. Leucodermia
511. Lichenomphalia
512. Lichina
513. Lichinella
514. Lichinodium
515. Lignoscripta
516. Lithoglypha
517. Lithographa
518. Lithogyalideopsis
519. Lithothelium
520. Llimonaea
521. Lobaria
522. Lobariella
523. Lobarina
524. Lobothallia
525. Loekoesia
526. Loflammia
527. Loflammiopsis
528. Logilvia
529. Lopacidia
530. Lopadium
531. Lopezaria
532. Loxospora
533. Loxosporopsis
534. Lueckingia
535. Lyromma
536. Magmopsis
537. Malcolmiella
538. Malmidea
539. Malmographina
540. Mangoldia
541. Marcelaria
542. Marchandiomphalina
543. Marchantiana
544. Marfloraea
545. Maronea
546. Maronella
547. Maronina
548. Masonhalea
549. Massalongia
550. Mastodia
551. Mawsonia
552. Mazaediothecium
553. Mazosia
554. Megalaria
555. Megaloblastenia
556. Megalospora
557. Megalotremis
558. Megaspora
559. Melanelia
560. Melanelixia
561. Melanohalea
562. Melanolecia
563. Melanophloea
564. Melanotopelia
565. Melanotrema
566. Melarthonis
567. Melaspilea
568. Menegazzia (list)
569. Meridianelia
570. Metamelanea
571. Metus
572. Micarea
573. Microtheliopsis
574. Milospium
575. Miltidea
576. Minksia
577. Miriquidica
578. Mischoblastia
579. Mobergia
580. Monerolechia
581. Monoblastia
582. Montanelia
583. Moriola
584. Multiclavula
585. Multisporidea
586. Mycobilimbia
587. Mycoblastus
588. Mycoporum
589. Myelochroa
590. Myeloconis
591. Myelorrhiza
592. Myriolecis
593. Myrionora
594. Myriospora
595. Myriostigma
596. Myochroidea
597. Nadvornikia
598. Nebularia
599. Neobrownliella
600. Neocatapyrenium
601. Neophyllis
602. Neopsoromopsis
603. Neosergipea
604. Nephroma
605. Nephromopsis
606. Nevesia
607. Niebla
608. Nigrovothelium
609. Nipponoparmelia
610. Nitidochapsa
611. Nodobryoria
612. Normandina
613. Notocladonia
614. Notoparmelia
615. Nyungwea
616. Obscuroplaca
617. Ocellomma
618. Ocellularia (list)
619. Ochrolechia
620. Oevstedalia
621. Olegblumia
622. Omphalodium
623. Omphalora
624. Opegrapha
625. Opeltia
626. Ophioparma
627. Orceolina
628. Orcularia
629. Orientophila
630. Oropogon
631. Orphniospora
632. Oxnerella
633. Pachnolepia
634. Pachyascus
635. Pachypeltis
636. Pachyphysis
637. Palicella
638. Pallidogramme
639. Pannaria
640. Pannoparmelia
641. Parabagliettoa
642. Paracollema
643. Paragyalideopsis
644. Parainoa
645. Paraporpidia
646. Paraschismatomma
647. Parasiphula
648. Paratopeliopsis
649. Paratricharia
650. Parmelia
651. Parmeliella
652. Parmelina
653. Parmelinella
654. Parmeliopsis
655. Parmostictina
656. Parmotrema (list)
657. Parmotremopsis
658. Parvoplaca
659. Paulia
660. Peccania
661. Pectenia
662. Peltigera
663. Peltula
664. Peltularia
665. Pentagenella
666. Pertusaria (list)
667. Petractis
668. Phaeographis
669. Phaeographopsis
670. Phaeophyscia
671. Phaeorrhiza
672. Phloeopeccania
673. Phlyctis
674. Phoebus
675. Phylliscidium
676. Phyllisciella
677. Phylliscidiopsis
678. Phylliscum
679. Phyllobaeis
680. Phyllobathelium
681. Phylloblastia
682. Phyllocratera
683. Phyllogyalidea
684. Phyllopsora
685. Physcia
686. Physcidia
687. Physciella
688. Physconia
689. Physma
690. Piccolia
691. Pilophorus
692. Placidiopsis
693. Placidium
694. Placocarpus
695. Placolecis
696. Placomaronea
697. Placopsis
698. Placopyrenium
699. Placothelium
700. Placynthiella
701. Placynthiopsis
702. Placynthium
703. Platismatia
704. Platygramme
705. Platythecium
706. Plectocarpon
707. Pleopsidium
708. Pleurosticta
709. Pliariona
710. Podostictina
711. Podotara
712. Poeltiaria
713. Poeltidea
714. Poeltinula
715. Polistroma
716. Polyblastia
717. Polyblastidium
718. Polycauliona
719. Polychidium
720. Polymeridium
721. Polypyrenula
722. Polysporina
723. Porina
724. Porocyphus
725. Porpidia
726. Porpidinia
727. Protoblastenia
728. Protomicarea
729. Protopannaria
730. Protoparmelia
731. Protoparmeliopsis
732. Protoroccella
733. Protothelenella
734. Protousnea
735. Psammina
736. Psathyrophlyctis
737. Pseudarctomia
738. Pseudephebe
739. Pseudevernia
740. Pseudobaeomyces
741. Pseudocalopadia
742. Pseudochapsa
743. Pseudocyphellaria
744. Pseudohepatica
745. Pseudoheppia
746. Pseudolecanactis
747. Pseudoleptogium
748. Pseudopannaria
749. Pseudoparmelia
750. Pseudopaulia
751. Pseudopeltula
752. Pseudopyrenula
753. Pseudoramonia
754. Pseudosagedia
755. Pseudoschismatomma
756. Pseudothelomma
757. Pseudotopeliopsis
758. Psilolechia
759. Psiloparmelia
760. Psora
761. Psorinia
762. Psoroglaena
763. Psoroma
764. Psoromella
765. Psoromidium
766. Psoronactis
767. Psorotheciopsis
768. Psorotichia
769. Psorula
770. Pterygiopsis
771. Ptychographa
772. Pulvinodecton
773. Pulvinora
774. Punctelia
775. Punctonora
776. Puttea
777. Pycnora
778. Pycnothelia
779. Pycnotrema
780. Pyrenocarpon
781. Pyrenocollema
782. Pyrenodesmia
783. Pyrenopsis
784. Pyrenothrix
785. Pyrenowilmsia
786. Pyrenula (list)
787. Pyrgillus
788. Pyrrhospora
789. Pyxine
790. Racodium
791. Racoleus
792. Ramalea
793. Ramalina
794. Ramalodium
795. Ramboldia
796. Ramonia
797. Redingeria
798. Redonia
799. Redonographa
800. Rehmanniella
801. Reichlingia
802. Reimnitzia
803. Relicina
804. Remototrachyna
805. Requienella
806. Rhabdodiscus
807. Rhabdopsora
808. Rhaphidicyrtis
809. Rhexophiale
810. Rhizocarpon
811. Rhizolecia
812. Rhizoplaca
813. Ricasolia
814. Rimularia
815. Rinodina (list)
816. Rinodinella
817. Robergea
818. Roccella
819. Roccellographa
820. Roccellina
821. Roccellinastrum
822. Rockefellera
823. Rolfidium
824. Rolueckia
825. Romjularia
826. Ropalospora
827. Rostania
828. Rubrotricha
829. Rufoplaca
830. Rusavskia
831. Sagedia
832. Sagema
833. Sagenidiopsis
834. Sagiolechia
835. Sanguinotrema
836. Santessonia
837. Sarcographa
838. Sarcographina
839. Sarcogyne
840. Sarcosagium
841. Sarea
842. Sarrameana
843. Savoronala
844. Schadonia
845. Schaereria
846. Schismatomma
847. Schistophoron
848. Schizodiscus
849. Schizopelte
850. Schizotrema
851. Schizoxylon
852. Sclerococcum
853. Sclerophora
854. Sclerophyton
855. Scleropyrenium
856. Scoliciosporum
857. Sculptolumina
858. Scutaria
859. Scytinium
860. Sedelnikovaea
861. Segestria
862. Seirophora
863. Semigyalecta
864. Semiomphalina
865. Septotrapelia
866. Servitia
867. Shackletonia
868. Sigridea
869. Simonyella
870. Sipmaniella
871. Siphula
872. Siphulastrum
873. Siphulella
874. Sipmania
875. Sirenophila
876. Snippocia
877. Solenopsora
878. Solitaria
879. Solorina
880. Solorinaria
881. Sparria
882. Speerschneidera
883. Sphaerophorus
884. Sphaerophoropsis
885. Spheconisca
886. Sphinctrinopsis
887. Spilonema
888. Sporastatia
889. Sporodictyon
890. Sporodophoron
891. Sporopodiopsis
892. Sporopodium
893. Sporostigma
894. Sprucidea
895. Squamarina
896. Squamella
897. Squamulea
898. Staurospora
899. Staurolemma
900. Staurothele
901. Stegobolus
902. Steinera
903. Steineropsis
904. Steinia
905. Stellarangia
906. Stenhammarella
907. Stephanocyclos
908. Stereocaulon
909. Sticta
910. Stictis
911. Stigmatochroma
912. Stigmidium
913. Strangospora
914. Streimannia
915. Stirtonia
916. Stirtoniella
917. Strigula
918. Stromatella
919. Sulcaria
920. Sulcopyrenula
921. Sulzbacheromyces
922. Synalissa
923. Synarthonia
924. Synarthothelium
925. Syncesia
926. Szczawinskia
927. Tania
928. Tapellaria
929. Tapellariopsis
930. Tarbertia
931. Tasmidella
932. Tassiloa
933. Tayloriellina
934. Teloschistes
935. Teloschistopsis
936. Tenuitholiascus
937. Tephromela
938. Tetramelas
939. Teuvoa
940. Texosporium
941. Thallinocarpon
942. Thalloloma
943. Thamnochrolechia
944. Thamnolecania
945. Thamnolia
946. Thecaria
947. Thecographa
948. Thelenella
949. Thelenidia
950. Thelidiopsis
951. Thelignya
952. Thelliana
953. Thelocarpon
954. Thelomma
955. Thelopsis
956. Thelotrema
957. Thermutis
958. Thermutopsis
959. Tholurna
960. Thrombium
961. Thyrea
962. Thysanothecium
963. Tibellia
964. Timdalia
965. Tingiopsidium
966. Toensbergia
967. Toninia
968. Toniniopsis
969. Topelia
970. Topeliopsis
971. Tornabea
972. Trapelia
973. Trapeliopsis
974. Traponora
975. Tremolecia
976. Tremotylium
977. Tricharia
978. Trichothelium
979. Trimmatothele
980. Trimmatothelopsis
981. Trinathotrema
982. Trizodia
983. Trypetheliopsis
984. Trypethelium
985. Tuckermanella
986. Tuckermanopsis
987. Tylophorella
988. Tylophoron
989. Tylophoropsis
990. Tylothallia
991. Umbilicaria
992. Upretia
993. Usnea
994. Usnocetraria
995. Usnochroma
996. Vahliella
997. Vainionora
998. Varicellaria
999. Variospora
1000. Verrucaria (list)
1001. Verruculopsis
1002. Verseghya
1003. Vezdaea
1004. Vigneronia
1005. Villophora
1006. Violella
1007. Viridothelium
1008. Vulpicida
1009. Wadeana
1010. Wahlenbergiella
1011. Watsoniomyces
1012. Wawea
1013. Waynea
1014. Wetmoreana
1015. Willeya
1016. Wirthiotrema
1017. Xalocoa
1018. Xanthocarpia
1019. Xanthomendoza
1020. Xanthoparmelia (list)
1021. Xanthopeltis
1022. Xanthopsorella
1023. Xanthoria
1024. Xenolecia
1025. Xenus
1026. Xyleborus
1027. Xylographa
1028. Xyloschistes
1029. Xylopsora
1030. Yarrumia
1031. Yoshimuria
1032. Yoshimuriella
1033. Zahlbrucknerella
1034. Zeroviella
1035. Zwackhia

==== Species ====
In 2009, taxonomists estimated that the total number of lichen species (including those yet undiscovered) might be as high as 28,000. By 2016, 19,387 species of lichens had been described and widely accepted.

=== Lichens, by growth form ===
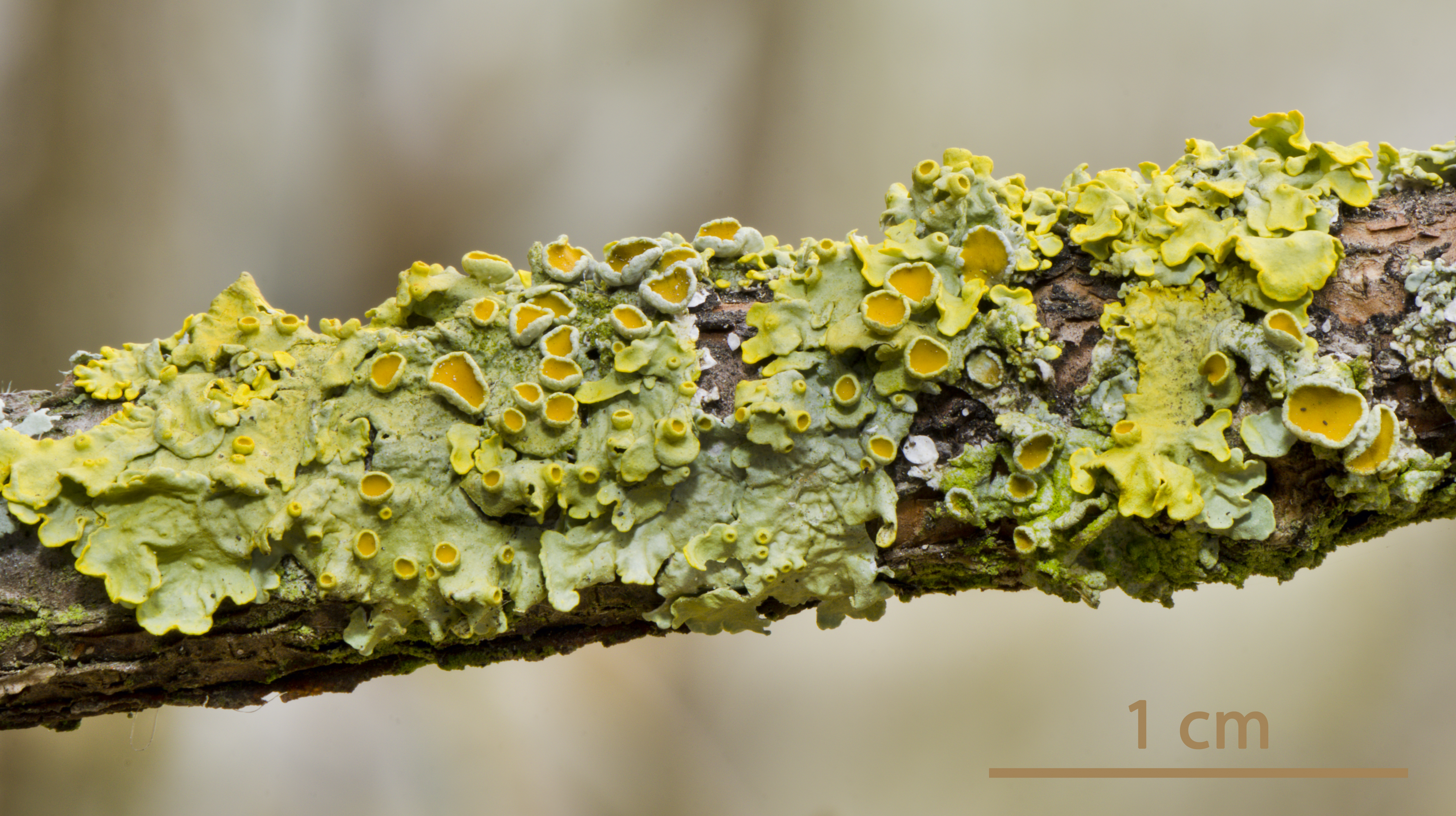
Xanthoria parietina has the leafy-looking growth of a foliose lichen.

Lichen growth forms – These vary depending on the species:

- Crustose – paint-like appearance that adheres tightly to the underlying substrate.
  - Areolate – crustose, but divided into rounded or polygonal pieces by means of cracks.
  - Leprose – powdery or granular appearance.
  - Calicioid – crustose growth with small fruiting bodies which resemble sewing pins.
  - Placodioid – crustose in the centre and lobed at the periphery.
- Foliose – flattened, leafy appearance.
- Fruticose – shrubby, bush-like or coral-like appearance.
  - Byssoid – wispy, with the appearance of teased wool.
  - Filamentous – thin, threadlike growth, often with a matted appearance.
- Gelatinous – jelly-like interior, due to presence of cyanobacteria.
- Squamulose – scaly, sometimes leafy appearance; can resemble a foliose lichen but usually has no outer cortex.
  - Cladoniform – squamulose, but with fruticose podetia.

=== Lichens, by substrate ===
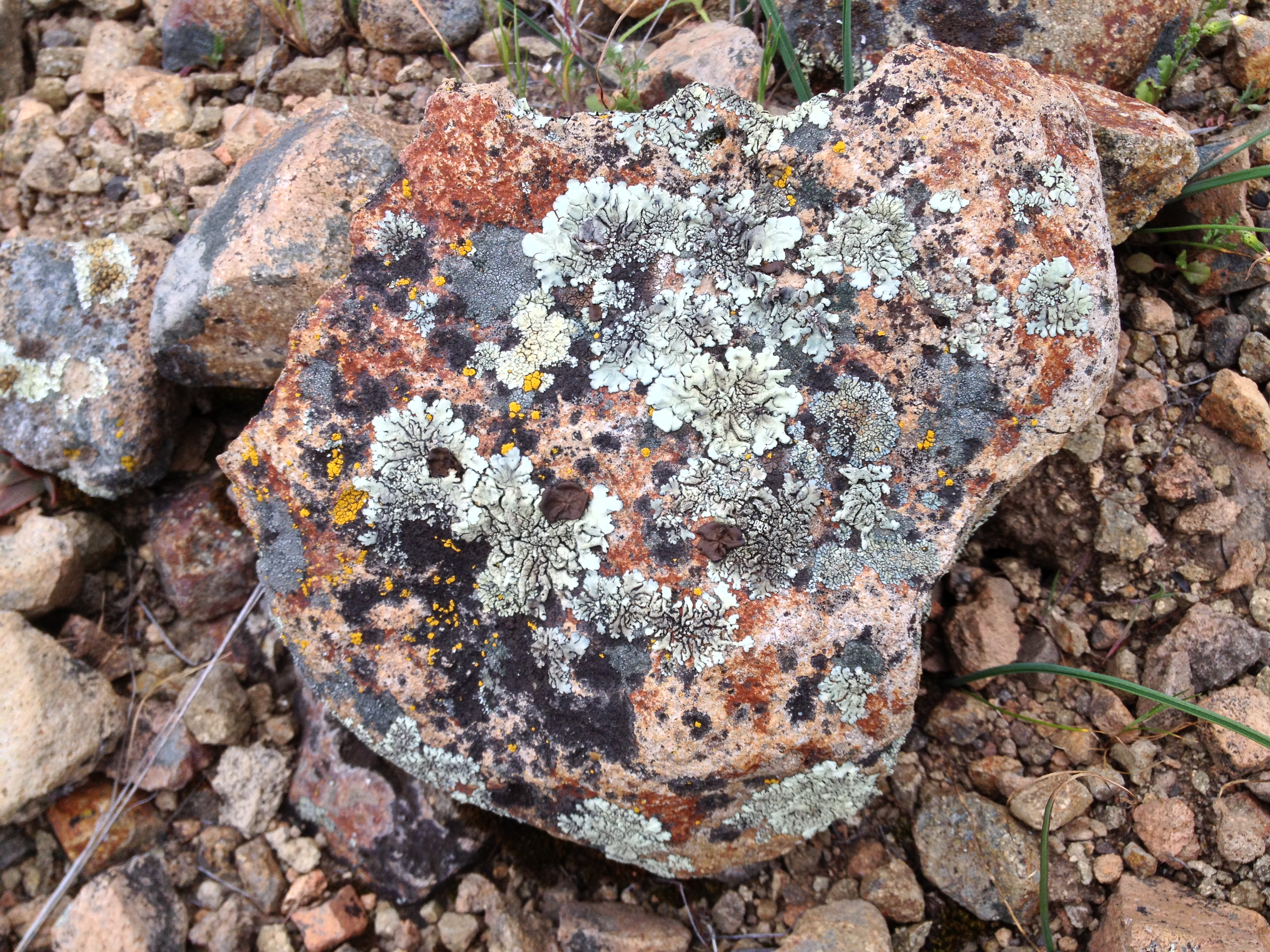
Saxicolous lichens are those which grow on stone.

Lichens can be classified by the substrate on which they grow:

- Bryophilous lichen – on mosses or liverworts.
  - Hepaticolous lichen – on liverworts.
  - Muscicolous lichen – on mosses.
- Corticolous lichen – on bark.
  - Ramicolous lichen – on twigs.
- Foliicolous lichen – on plant leaves.
  - Epiphyllous lichen – on the upper surface of a leaf.
  - Hypophyllous lichen – on the lower surface of a leaf.
- Lichenicolous lichen – on other lichens.
- Lignicolous lichen – on wood stripped of bark.
- Omnicolous lichen – on a variety of substrates.
- Plasticolous lichen – on plastic.
- Saxicolous lichen – on stone.
  - Endolithic lichen – within stone.
- Terricolous lichen – on soil.
- Vagrant lichen – loose, on no substrate.

=== Lichens, by region ===
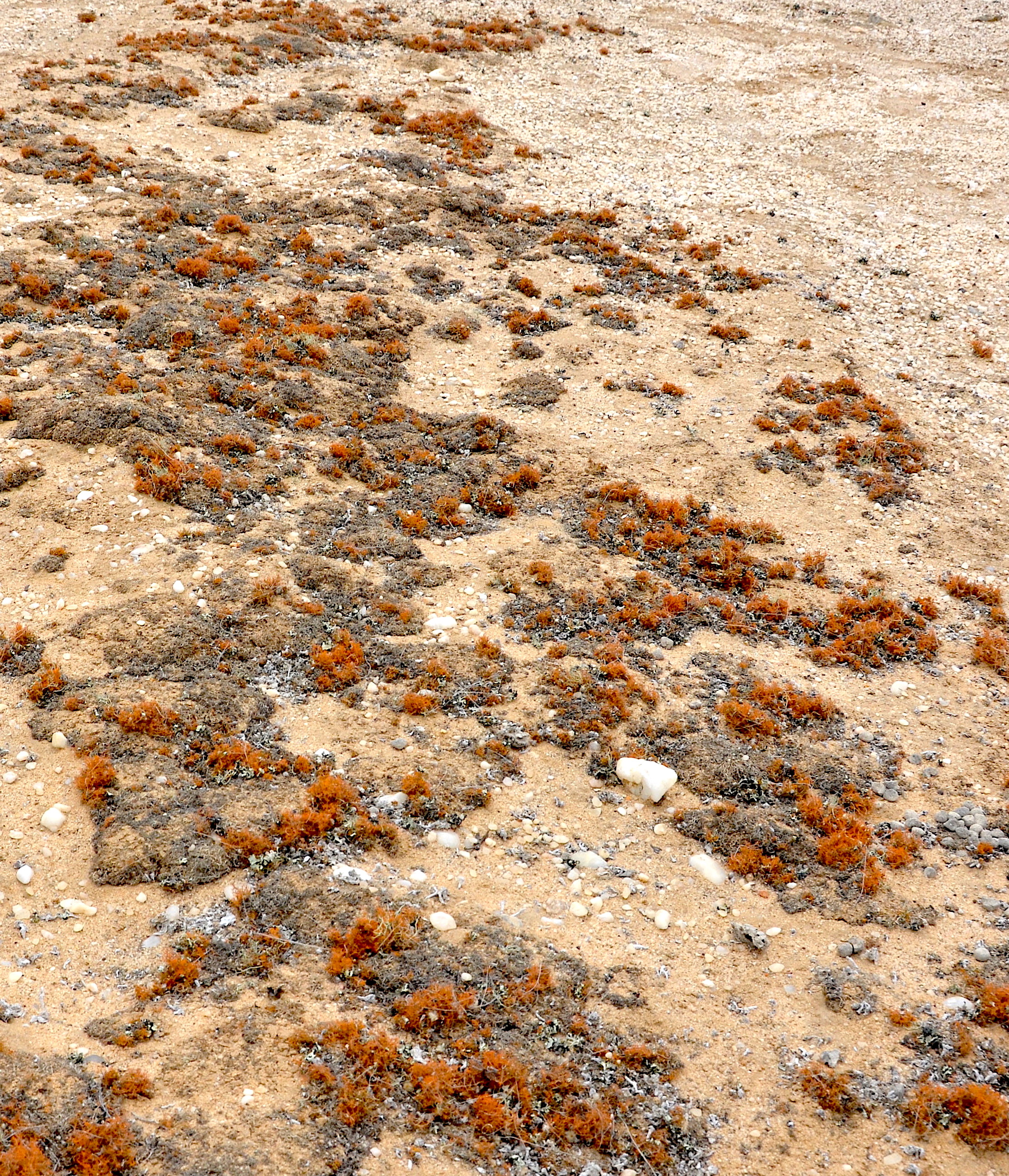
Namibia's vast deserts, which hold many species of lichen, remain largely unsurveyed.

==== Africa ====
- Lichens of Namibia
- List of lichens of Madagascar
- List of lichens of Rwanda

==== Asia ====
- List of lichens of Sri Lanka

==== Australia ====
- List of lichens of Western Australia

==== Europe ====
- List of lichens of Sweden

==== North America ====
- List of lichens of Maryland
  - List of lichens of Soldiers Delight – lichens of a nature reserve in Maryland
- List of lichen species of Montana
- Lichens of the Sierra Nevada

== Photobiont ==
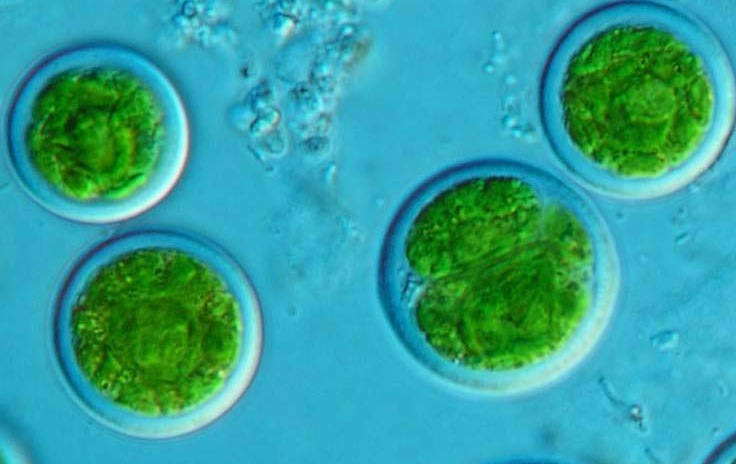
The photobiont in most lichens is a green alga, particularly those from the genus Trebouxia.

Photobiont – the photosynthetic partner in a lichen.

- Cyanolichen – a lichen with a cyanobacteria photobiont.
- List of lichen photobionts

== Lichen metabolites ==
Lichen product – organic products, known as secondary metabolites, produced by lichens; these provide a variety of protections for the lichen – from microbes, viruses, herbivores, radiation, oxidants and more.

- List of lichen products

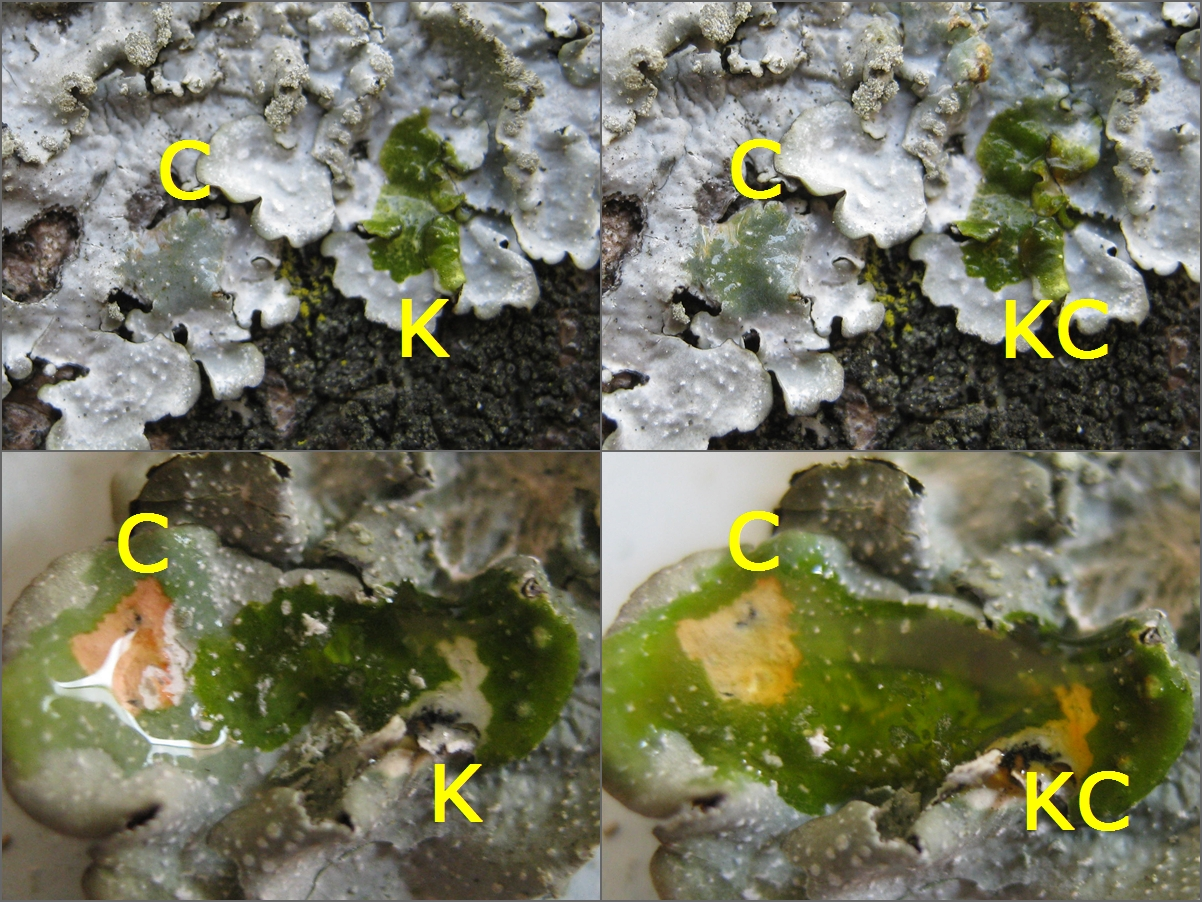
Chemical spot tests on the foliose lichen Punctelia borreri showing thallus (top) and medulla (bottom). The pinkish-red colour change of the medulla in the C and KC tests indicate the presence of gyrophoric acid, a chemical feature that helps to distinguish this lichen from similar species in the same genus.

== Study of lichens ==
Lichenology – the study of lichens.

- Acharius Medal – awarded for lifetime achievement in lichenology.
- Evolution of lichens – lichenization of fungi has occurred multiple times, and several pathways towards acquiring photobionts have arisen.
  - List of fossil lichens
- Exsiccata (plural exsiccatae) – a published set of preserved specimens, numbered and distributed with printed labels.
- History of lichenology
- Lichenometry – a process where measuring the growth of a lichen colony over time can be used to estimate the minimum age of the substrate on which it is growing.
- Spot test (lichen) – chemical tests used to aid in species identification.

== Threats ==
- Lichenicolous fungus – parasitic fungus that uses lichens as a host.

- List of lichenicolous fungi

- Lichens as bioindicators – lichens are sensitive to various pollutants and can be thus be used as bioindicators.

- Lichens and air pollution – many lichens are sensitive to various forms of air pollution.
- Lichens and climate change – the inability of algae to quickly evolve means that climate change may adversely impact lichens.

== Lichens in culture ==
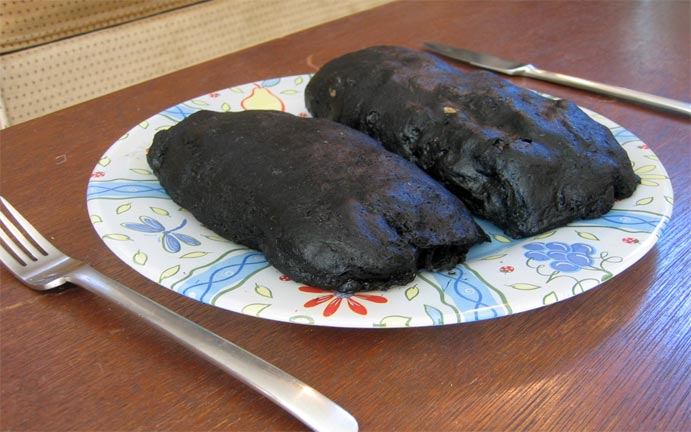
Two baked loaves of Bryoria fremontii, an important traditional food for some First Nations people

- Cultural depictions of lichens
- Trouble with Lichen – science fiction novel by John Wyndham in which lichens play a major role.
- Edible lichen – some lichens have traditionally been used as food.
- Ethnolichenology – a branch of ethnobotany that studies human usage of lichens.

=== Lichen organizations ===
- American Bryological and Lichenological Society (ABLS)

- The Bryologist – peer-reviewed journal published by ABLS.

- Australasian Lichen Society

- Australasian Lichenology – official publication of the Australasian Lichen Society.

- British Lichen Society (BLS)

- The Lichenologist – peer-reviewed journal published by the BLS.

- Bryological and Lichenological Association for Central Europe (BLAM)

- Herzogia – peer-reviewed journal published by BLAM.

- Bryological and Lichenological Working Group (Bryologische en Lichenologische Werkgroep, BLWG)

- Buxbaumiella – peer-reviewed journal published by BLWG.

- Dutch Bryological and Lichenological Society

- Lindbergia – peer-reviewed journal co-published by the Dutch Bryological and Lichenological Society and the Nordic Bryological Society.

- Indian Lichenological Society
- International Association for Lichenology (IAL)
- Nordic Bryological Society

==== Independent lichenological journals ====
- Asian Journal of Mycology – an international peer-reviewed journal published by Mae Fah Luang University in Thailand.
- Bibliotheca Lichenologica – scientific monographs on lichens and mosses.
- Hattoria – an international, peer-reviewed journal issued by Hattori Botanical Laboratory.
- International Journal of Mycology and Lichenology

== See also ==
- Glossary of lichen terms

== Citations ==
=== References ===
- Aptroot, A.; Sparrius, L.B.; Alvarado, P. (2018). "Aquacidia, a new genus to accommodate a group of skiophilous temperate Bacidia species that belong in the Pilocarpaceae (lichenized ascomycetes)". Gorteria. 40: 11–14. ISSN 2542-8578.
- "Awards". International Association for Lichenology. Archived from the original on 23 July 2011.
- Baron, George (1999). Understanding Lichens. Slough: Richmond Publishing. ISBN 978-0-85546-252-9.
- Bendre, Ashok M. (2010). A Text Book of Practical Botany. New Delhi: Rastogi Publications. ISBN 978-81-7133-923-5.
- Bowler, P. A.; Rundel, P. W. (June 1975). "Reproductive strategies in lichens". Botanical Journal of the Linnean Society. 70 (4): 325–340. doi:10.1111/j.1095-8339.1975.tb01653.x.
- Brodo, Irwin M.; Sharnoff, Sylvia Duran; Sharnoff, Stephen (2001). Lichens of North America. New Haven, CT: Yale University Press. ISBN 978-0-300-08249-4.
- Bungartz, F.; Søchting, U.; Arup, U. (December 2021). "Obscuroplaca gen. nov. – a replacement name for Phaeoplaca; Teloschistaceae (lichenized Ascomycota) from the Galapagos Islands". Plant and Fungal Systematics. 66 (2): 240–241. doi:10.35535/pfsyst-2021-0022. S2CID 245619926.
- Cáceres, Marcela Eugenia da Silva; Aptroot, André; Mendonça, Cléverton Oliveira; Santos, Lidiane Alves; Lücking, Robert (2017). "Sprucidea, a further new genus of rain forest lichens in the family Malmideaceae (Ascomycota)". Bryologist. 120 (2): 202–211. doi:10.1639/0007-2745-120.2.202. S2CID 90645323.
- Chen, Jie; Blume, Hans-Peter; Beyer, Lothar (March 2000). "Weathering of rocks induced by lichen colonization — a review". Catena. 39 (2): 121–146. Bibcode:2000Caten..39..121C. doi:10.1016/S0341-8162(99)00085-5.
- Chesnokov, Sergey V.; Davydov, Evgeny A.; Konoreva, Liudmila A.; Prokopiev, Ilya A.; Poryadina, Lena N.; Zheludeva, Elena V.; Shavarda, Alexey L. (2023). "The monotypic genus Flavocetraria and two new genera: Cladocetraria and Foveolaria, in the cetrarioid core". Plant Systematics and Evolution. 309 (4): e24. Bibcode:2023PSyEv.309...24C. doi:10.1007/s00606-023-01862-2.
- Davydov, Evgeny A.; Yakovchenko, Lidia S.; Hollinger, Jason; Bungartz, Frank; Parrinello, Christian; Printzen, Christian (2021). "The new genus Pulvinora (Lecanoraceae) for species of the 'Lecanora pringlei' group, including the new species Pulvinora stereothallina". The Bryologist. 124 (2): 242–256. doi:10.1639/0007-2745-124.2.242. S2CID 235188598.
- Ekman, Stefan; Wedin, Mats; Lindblom, Louise; Jørgensen, Per M. (2014). "Extended phylogeny and a revised generic classification of the Pannariaceae (Peltigerales, Ascomycota)" (PDF). The Lichenologist. 46 (5): 627–656. Bibcode:2014ThLic..46..627E. doi:10.1017/S002428291400019X.
- Díaz-Escandón, David; Hawksworth, David L.; Powell, Mark; Resl, Philipp; Spribille, Toby (February 2021). "The British chalk specialist Lecidea lichenicola auct. revealed as a new genus of Lichinomycetes". Fungal Biology. 125 (7): 495–504. Bibcode:2021FunB..125..495D. doi:10.1016/j.funbio.2021.01.007. PMID 34140146. S2CID 234008195.
- Diederich, Paul; Ertz, Damien (2020). "First checklist of lichens and lichenicolous fungi from Mauritius, with phylogenetic analyses and description of new taxa". Plant and Fungal Systematics. 65 (1): 13–75. doi:10.35535/pfsyst-2020-0003.
- Divakar, Pradeep K.; Crespo, Ana; Kraichak, Ekaphan; Leavitt, Steven D.; Singh, Garima; Schmitt, Imke; Lumbsch, H. Thorsten (2017). "Using a temporal phylogenetic method to harmonize family- and genus-level classification in the largest clade of lichen-forming fungi". Fungal Diversity. 84 (1): 101–117. Bibcode:2017FuDiv..84..101D. doi:10.1007/s13225-017-0379-z. S2CID 40674310.
- Dobson, Frank S. (2011). Lichens: An Illustrated Guide to the British and Irish Species. Slough, UK: Richmond Publishing Co. ISBN 978-0-85546-316-8.
- Ertz, Damien; Søchting, Ulrik; Gadea, Alice; Charrier, Maryvonne; Poulsen, Roar S. (2017). "Ducatina umbilicata gen. et sp. nov., a remarkable Trapeliaceae from the subantarctic islands in the Indian Ocean". The Lichenologist. 49 (2): 127–140. Bibcode:2017ThLic..49..127E. doi:10.1017/s0024282916000700. S2CID 90273663.
- Ertz, Damien; Sanderson, Neil; Łubek, Anna; Kukwa, Martin (March 2018). "Two new species of Arthoniaceae from old-growth European forests, Arthonia thoriana and Inoderma sorediatum, and a new genus for Schismatomma niveum". The Lichenologist. 50 (2): 161–172. Bibcode:2018ThLic..50..161E. doi:10.1017/S0024282917000688.
- Etayo, Javier (2017). Hongos liquenícolas de Ecuador (PDF). Opera Lilloana (in Spanish). San Miguel de Tucumán, Argentina: Fundación Miguel Lillo.
- Favor, Lesli J. (2005). Eukaryotic and Prokaryotic Cell Structures: Understanding Cells with and Without a Nucleus. New York: Rosen Publishing Group. ISBN 978-1-4042-0323-5.
- Field Museum (15 February 2022). "Lichens are in danger of losing the evolutionary race with climate change". Phys.org.
- Fryday, Alan M.; Medeiros, Ian D.; Siebert, Stefan J.; Pope, Nathaniel; Rajakaruna, Nishanta (2020). "Burrowsia, a new genus of lichenized fungi (Caliciaceae), plus the new species B. cataractae and Scoliciosporum fabisporum, from Mpumalanga, South Africa". South African Journal of Botany. 132: 471–481. Bibcode:2020SAJB..132..471F. doi:10.1016/j.sajb.2020.06.001.
- Galloway, D. J. (2012). "Lichen biogeography". In Nash III, Thomas H. (ed.). Lichen Biology. Cambridge UK: Cambridge University Press. pp. 315–335. ISBN 978-0-521-69216-8.
- Gamundí, Irma J.; Spinedi, H. A. (1985). "Phaneromyces Speg. & Hariot, a discomycetous genus of critical taxonomic position" (PDF). Sydowia. 38: 106–113.
- "Glossary of Terms". The British Lichen Society. 2022b.
- Goga, Michal; Elečko, Ján; Marcinčinová, Margaréta; Ručová, Dajana; Bačkorová, Miriam; Bačkor, Martin (2018). "Lichen Metabolites: An Overview of Some Secondary Metabolites and Their Biological Potential". In Merillon, J. M.; Ramawat, K. (eds.). Bioactive Molecules in Food. Reference Series in Phytochemistry. Springer, Cham. pp. 1–36. doi:10.1007/978-3-319-76887-8_57-1. ISBN 978-3-319-76887-8.
- Green, T. G. Allen; Pintado, Ana; Raggio, Jose; Sancho, Leopoldo Garcia (May 2018). "The lifestyle of lichens in soil crusts". The Lichenologist. 50 (3): 397–410. Bibcode:2018ThLic..50..397G. doi:10.1017/S0024282918000130. S2CID 90874682.
- Grube, M.; Matzer, M.; Hafellner, J. (January 1995). "A Preliminary Account of the Lichenicolous Arthonia Species with Reddish, K+ Reactive Pigments". The Lichenologist. 27 (1): 25–42. Bibcode:1995ThLic..27...25G. doi:10.1006/lich.1995.9999.
- Grube, Martin (October 2018). "Staurospora, a new genus for a unique species with spherical ascospores in Arthoniaceae". Herzogia. 31 (p1): 695–699. Bibcode:2018Herz...31..695.. doi:10.13158/heia.31.1.2018.695. S2CID 198159947.
- Hale, Mason E., ed. (1983). The Biology of Lichens (3rd ed.). London: Edward Arnold Ltd. ISBN 978-0-7131-2867-3.
- Hawksworth, David Leslie; Sutton, Brian Charles; Ainsworth, Geoffrey Clough, eds. (1983). Ainsworth & Bisby's dictionary of the fungi, including lichens (7th ed.). Kew, Surrey: Commonwealth Mycological Institute. ISBN 978-0-85198-515-2.
- Henriksson, Elisabet; Simu, Barbro (1971). "Nitrogen Fixation by Lichens". Oikos. 22 (1): 119–121. Bibcode:1971Oikos..22..119H. doi:10.2307/3543371. JSTOR 3543371.
- Honegger, Rosmarie (May 1998). "The Lichen Symbiosis – What is so Spectacular about it?" (PDF). The Lichenologist. 30 (3): 193–212. doi:10.1017/s002428299200015x.
- Ivanova, Diana; Ivanov, Dobri (2009). "Ethnobotanical use of lichens: lichens for food review". Scripta Scientifica Medica. 41 (1): 11–16. doi:10.14748/ssm.v41i1.456.
- Jiang, Shu Hua; Hawksworth, David L.; Lücking, Robert; Wei, Jiang Chun (2020). "A new genus and species of foliicolous lichen in a new family of Strigulales (Ascomycota: Dothideomycetes) reveals remarkable class-level homoplasy". IMA Fungus. 11 (1): 1–13. doi:10.1186/s43008-019-0026-2. PMC 7325298. PMID 32617253.
- Kalb, Klaus; Aptroot, André (2021). "New lichens from Africa" (PDF). Archive for Lichenology. 28: 1–12.
- Kantvilas, Gintaras (May 1996). "A new byssoid lichen genus from Tasmania" (PDF). The Lichenologist. 28 (3): 229–237. Bibcode:1996ThLic..28..229K. doi:10.1006/lich.1996.0020. S2CID 85573550. Archived from the original (PDF) on 28 October 2014.
- Kantvilas, Gintaras; Wedin, Mats; Svensson, Måns (September 2021). "Australidea (Malmideaceae, Lecanorales), a new genus of lecideoid lichens, with notes on the genus Malcolmiella". The Lichenologist. 53 (5): 395–407. Bibcode:2021ThLic..53..395K. doi:10.1017/s0024282921000311. S2CID 238638591.
- Kondratyuk, S.Y.; Kärnefelt, I.; Thell, A.; Elix, J.A.; Kim, J.; Kondratiuk, A. S.; Hur, J.-S. (2015). "Brownlielloideae, a new subfamily in the Teloschistaceae (Lecanoromycetes, Ascomycota)" (PDF). Acta Botanica Hungarica. 57 (3–4): 321–343. doi:10.1556/034.57.2015.3-4.6.
- Kondratyuk, S.Y.; Lőkös, L.; Halda, J.P.; Haji Moniri, M.; Farkas, E.; Park, J.S.; Lee, B.G.; Oh, S.O.; Hur, J.S. (2016). "New and noteworthy lichen-forming and lichenicolous fungi 4". Acta Botanica Hungarica. 58 (1–2): 75–136. doi:10.1556/034.58.2016.1-2.4.
- Kondratyuk, S.Y.; Lőkös, L.; Upreti, D. K.; Nayaka, S.; Mishra, G.K.; Ravera, S.; Jeong, M.-H.; Jang, S.-H.; Park, J.S.; Hur, J.-S. (2017). "New monophyletic branches of the Teloschistaceae (lichen-forming Ascomycota) proved by three gene phylogeny" (PDF). Acta Botanica Hungarica. 59 (1–2): 71–136. doi:10.1556/034.59.2017.1-2.6. hdl:10447/414429.
- Kondratyuk, S.Y.; Persson, P.-E.; Hansson, M.; Lőkös, L.; Liu, D.; Hur, J.-S.; Kärnefelt, I.; Thell, A. (2018). "Hosseusiella and Rehmanniella, two new genera in the Teloschistaceae" (PDF). Acta Botanica Hungarica. 60 (1–2): 89–113. doi:10.1556/034.60.2018.1-2.7.
- Kondratyuk, S.Y.; Persson, P.E.; Hansson, M.; Mishra, G.K.; Nayaka, S.; Liu, D.; Hur, J.S.; Thell, A. (2018). "Upretia, a new caloplacoid lichen genus (Teloschistaceae, lichen-forming Ascomycota) from India". Cryptogam Biodiversity and Assessment. S2018: 22–31. doi:10.21756/cab.v3i01.esp5 (inactive 12 July 2025).
- Kondratyuk, S. Y.; Lőkös, L.; Farkas, E.; Jang, S.-H.; Liu, D.; Halda, J.; Persson, P.-E.; Hansson, M.; Kärnefelt, I.; Thell, A.; Hur, J.-S. (2019). "Three new genera of the Ramalinaceae (lichen-forming Ascomycota) and the phenomenon of presence of 'extraneous mycobiont DNA' in lichen associations" (PDF). Acta Botanica Hungarica. 61 (3–4): 275–323. doi:10.1556/034.61.2019.3-4.5. S2CID 208580456.
- Kondratyuk, S.Y.; Lőkös, L.; Kärnefelt, I.; Thell, A.; Jeong, M.-H.; Oh, S.-O.; Kondratiuk, A.S.; Farkas, E.; Hur, J.-S. (2021). "Contributions to molecular phylogeny of lichen-forming fungi 2. Review of current monophyletic branches of the family Physciaceae" (PDF). Acta Botanica Hungarica. 63 (3–4): 351–390. doi:10.1556/034.63.2021.3-4.8. S2CID 239503884.
- Kraichak, E.; Huang, J.P.; Nelsen, M.; Leavitt, S.D.; Lumbsch, H.T. (2018). "A revised classification of orders and families in the two major subclasses of Lecanoromycetes (Ascomycota) based on a temporal approach". Botanical Journal of the Linnean Society. 20: 1–17. doi:10.1093/botlinnean/boy060/5091569 (inactive 12 July 2025). S2CID 92280920.
- Kraichak, E.; Huang, J.P.; Nelsen, M.; Leavitt, S.D.; Lumbsch, H.T. (12 September 2018). "Nomenclatural novelties" (PDF). Index Fungorum. 375: 1. ISSN 2049-2375.
- Kistenich, Sonja; Timdal, Einar; Bendiksby, Mika; Ekman, Stefan (2018). "Molecular systematics and character evolution in the lichen family Ramalinaceae (Ascomycota: Lecanorales)". Taxon. 67 (5): 871–904. Bibcode:2018Taxon..67..871K. doi:10.12705/675.1. hdl:10852/67955.
- Laundon, Jack R. (1986). Lichens. Shire Natural History series. Princes Risborough: Shire Publications. ISBN 978-0-85263-811-8.
- Lawrey, James D.; Diederich, Paul (Spring 2003). "Lichenicolous Fungi: Interactions, Evolution, and Biodiversity". The Bryologist. 106 (1): 80–120. doi:10.1639/0007-2745(2003)106[0080:LFIEAB]2.0.CO;2. JSTOR 3244800. S2CID 85790408.
- Lendemer, James; Harris, Richard C.; Ruiz, Ana Maria (March 2016). "A Review of the Lichens of the Dare Regional Biodiversity Hotspot in the Mid-Atlantic Coastal Plain of North Carolina, Eastern North America". Castanea. 81 (1): 1–77. Bibcode:2016Casta..81....1L. doi:10.2179/15-073R2.
- Lendemer, James C.; Buck, William R.; Harris, Richard C. (September 2016). "Two new host-specific hepaticolous species of Catinaria (Ramalinaceae)". The Lichenologist. 48 (5): 441–449. Bibcode:2016ThLic..48..441L. doi:10.1017/S0024282916000438. S2CID 89433929.
- Lendemer, James C.; Stone, Heather B.; Tripp, Erin A. (2017). "Taxonomic delimitation of the rare, eastern North American endemic lichen Santessoniella crossophylla (Pannariaceae)". The Journal of the Torrey Botanical Society. 144 (4): 459–468. doi:10.3159/torrey-d-16-00009.1. JSTOR 26305705. S2CID 90392751.
- Lepp, Heino (2014). "Basidiolichens". Australian Lichens. Australian National Herbarium and Australian National Botanic Gardens.
- Li, Xi; Hou, Zheng; Xu, Chenjie; Shi, Xuan; Yang, Lingxiao; Lewis, Louise A.; Zhong, Bojian (July 2021). "Large Phylogenomic Data sets Reveal Deep Relationships and Trait Evolution in Chlorophyte Green Algae". Genome Biology and Evolution. 13 (7): 329–332. doi:10.1093/gbe/evab101. PMC 8271138. PMID 8271138.
- "Lichen". Cambridge Dictionary.
- "Lichen Morphology". The British Lichen Society. 2022a.
- "Lichenology". Merriam-Webster.
- Lücking, Robert (May 1998). "'Plasticolous' Lichens in a Tropical Rain Forest at La Selva Biological Station, Costa Rica". The Lichenologist. 30 (3): 287–291. doi:10.1006/lich.1998.0124. S2CID 250348579.
- Lücking, Robert (2008). "Foliicolous Lichenized Fungi". Flora Neotropica. 103: 1–866. ISSN 0071-5794. JSTOR 25660968.
- Lücking, Robert; Hodkinson, Brendan P.; Leavitt, Steven D. (Winter 2016). "The 2016 classification of lichenized fungi in the Ascomycota and Basidiomycota–Approaching one thousand genera". The Bryologist. 119 (4): 361–416. doi:10.1639/0007-2745-119.4.361. JSTOR 44250015. S2CID 90258634.
- Lücking, Robert; Hodkinson, Brendan P.; Leavitt, Steven D. (2017). "Corrections and amendments to the 2016 classification of lichenized fungi in the Ascomycota and Basidiomycota". The Bryologist. 120 (1): 58–69. doi:10.1639/0007-2745-120.1.058. JSTOR 44820821. S2CID 90363578.
- Lücking, Robert; Kalb, Klause (2018). "Formal instatement of Allographa (Graphidaceae): how to deal with a hyperdiverse genus complex with cryptic differentiation and paucity of molecular data". Herzogia. 31 (p1): 535–561. Bibcode:2018Herz...31..535.. doi:10.13158/heia.31.1.2018.535. S2CID 217375498.
- Lücking, Robert; Rivas-Plata, E; Chavez, JL; Umaña, L; Sipman, HJM (2009). "How many tropical lichens are there… really?". Bibliotheca Lichenologica. 100: 399–418.
- Nimis, Pier Luigi; Scheidegger, Christoph; Wolseley, Patricia A., eds. (2002). Monitoring with Lichens - Monitoring Lichens. Vol. 7. Dordrecht: Springer Science+Business. ISBN 978-94-010-0423-7.
- Oliver, Mary (March 2011). "Canaries in a coal mine: using lichens to measure nitrogen pollution" (PDF). Science Findings. 131. USDA Forest Service, Pacific Northwest Research Station.
- Pfister, Donald H. (1985). "A bibliographic account of exsiccatae containing fungi". Mycotaxon. 23: 1–139. doi:10.5962/p.416989.
- Purvis, William (2000). Lichens. Life Series. London: The Natural History Museum. ISBN 978-0-565-09153-8.
- Rikkinen, Jouko (April 2015). "Cyanolichens". Biodiversity and Conservation. 24 (4): 973–993. Bibcode:2015BiCon..24..973R. doi:10.1007/s10531-015-0906-8. S2CID 254277998.
- Rosentreter, Roger (Autumn 1993). "Vagrant Lichens in North America". The Bryologist. 96 (3): 333–338. Bibcode:1993Bryol..96..333R. doi:10.2307/3243861. JSTOR 3243861.
- Sanders, William B. (December 2001). "Lichens: the interface between mycology and plant morphology". BioScience. 51 (12): 1025–1035. doi:10.1641/0006-3568(2001)051[1025:LTIBMA]2.0.CO;2. S2CID 52255499.
- Schultz, Matthias; Zedda, Luciana; Rambold, Gerhard (2009). "New records of lichen taxa from Namibia and South Africa Bibliotheca Lichenologica" (PDF). In Aptroot, André; Seaward, Mark R.D.; Sparrius, Laurens B. (eds.). Biodiversity and ecology of lichens – Liber Amicorum Harrie Sipman. Vol. 99. Berlin and Stuttgart: J. Cramer. pp. 315–334.
- Silverstein, Alvin; Silverstein, Virginia B.; Silverstein, Robert A. (1996). Fungi. New York: Twenty-First Century Books. ISBN 978-0-8050-3520-9.
- Simon, Antoine; Lücking, Robert; Moncada, Bibiana; Mercado-Díaz, Joel A.; Bungartz, Frank; da Silva Cáceres, Marcela Eugenia; Gumboski, Emerson Luiz; de Azevedo Martins, Suzana Maria; Spielmann, Adriano; Parker, Dinah; Goffinet, Bernard (2020). "Emmanuelia, a new genus of lobarioid lichen-forming fungi (Ascomycota: Peltigerales): phylogeny and synopsis of accepted species". Plant and Fungal Systematics. 65 (1): 76–94. doi:10.35535/pfsyst-2020-0004.
- Smith, C. W.; Aptroot, A.; Coppins, B. J.; Fletcher, A.; Gilbert, O. L.; James, P. W.; Wolseley, P. A., eds. (2009). The Lichens of Great Britain and Ireland. London: The British Lichen Society. ISBN 978-0-9540418-8-5.
- Smith, Hayden B.; Dal Grande, Francesco; Muggia, Lucia; Keuler, Rachel; Divakar, Pradeep K.; Grewe, Felix; Schmitt, Imke; Lumbsch, H. Thorsten; Leavitt, Steven D. (November 2020). "Metagenomic data reveal diverse fungal and algal communities associated with the lichen symbiosis". Symbiosis. 82 (1–2): 133–147. Bibcode:2020Symbi..82..133S. doi:10.1007/s13199-020-00699-4. hdl:11577/3440801. S2CID 214724803.
- Sobreira, Priscylla Nayara Bezerra; Cáceres, Marcela Eugenia Da Silva; Maia, Leonor Costa; Lücking, Robert (July 2018). "Flabelloporina, a new genus in the Porinaceae (Ascomycota, Ostropales), with the first record of F. squamulifera from Brazil". Phytotaxa. 538 (1): 67–75. Bibcode:2018Phytx.358...67S. doi:10.11646/phytotaxa.358.1.4. S2CID 89707839.
- Sodamuk, Mattika; Boonpragob, Kansri; Mongkolsuk, Pachara; Tehler, Andrs; Leavitt, Steven D.; Lumbsch, H. Thorsten (2017). "Kalbionora palaeotropica, a new genus and species from coastal forests in Southeast Asia and Australia (Malmideaceae, Ascomycota)". MycoKeys (22): 15–25. doi:10.3897/mycokeys.22.12528.
- Spribille, Toby; Fryday, Alan M.; Pérez-Ortega, Sergio; Svensson, Måns; Tønsberg, Tor; Ekman, Stefan; Holien, Håkon; Resl, Philipp; Schneider, Kevin; Stabentheiner, Edith; Thüs, Holger; Vondrák, Jan; Sharman, Lewis (March 2020). "Lichens and associated fungi from Glacier Bay National Park, Alaska". The Lichenologist. 52 (2): 61–181. Bibcode:2020ThLic..52...61S. doi:10.1017/S0024282920000079. hdl:10261/232567. PMC 7398404. PMID 32788812.
- Temu, Stella Gilbert; Tibell, Sanja; Tibuhwa, Donatha Damian; Tibell, Leif (October 2019). "Crustose calicioid lichens and fungi in mountain cloud forests of Tanzania". Microorganisms. 7 (11): 491. doi:10.3390/microorganisms7110491. PMC 6920850. PMID 31717781.
- Trouble with Lichen. Penguin Books. 7 August 2008.
- Truong, Camille; Clerc, Philippe (2003). "The Parmelia borreri group (lichenized ascomycetes) in Switzerland". Botanica Helvetica. 113 (1): 49–61.
- Turner, Nancy J. (October 1977). "Economic importance of black tree lichen (Bryoria fremontii) to the Indians of western North America". Economic Botany. 31 (4): 461–470. Bibcode:1977EcBot..31..461T. doi:10.1007/BF02912559. JSTOR 4253875. S2CID 29530274.
- Upreti, Dalip K.; Rai, Himanshu, eds. (2013). Terricolous Lichens in India. Vol. 1: Diversity Patterns and Distribution Ecology. New York: Springer. ISBN 978-1-4614-8736-4.
- Van Hoose, Natalie (21 July 2021). "Yeast emerges as hidden third partner in lichen symbiosis". Purdue University News. Purdue University.
- Vinayaka, K. S.; Krishnamurthy, Y. L. (2012). "Ethno-lichenological Studies of Shimoga and Mysore Districts, Karnataka, India". Advances in Plant Sciences. 25 (1): 265–267.
- Wijayawardene, N.N.; Hyde, K.D.; Dai, D.Q.; Sánchez-García, M.; Goto, B.T.; Saxena, R.K.; et al. (2022). "Outline of Fungi and fungus-like taxa – 2021". Mycosphere. 13 (1): 53–453. doi:10.5943/mycosphere/13/1/2. hdl:10481/76378. S2CID 249054641.
- Wilk, Karina; Pabijan, Maciej; Saługa, Marta; Gaya, Ester; Lücking, Robert (2021). "Phylogenetic revision of South American Teloschistaceae (lichenized Ascomycota, Teloschistales) reveals three new genera and species". Mycologia. 113 (2): 278–299. doi:10.1080/00275514.2020.1830672. PMID 33428561. S2CID 231586897.
- Zakeri, Zakieh; Divakar, Pradeep K.; Otte, Volker (2017). "Taxonomy and phylogeny of Aspiciliella, a resurrected genus of Megasporaceae, including the new species A. portosantana". Herzogia. 30 (1): 166–176. Bibcode:2017Herz...30..166Z. doi:10.13158/heia.30.1.2017.166.
- Zakeri, Zakieh; Junne, Stefan; Jäger, Fabian; Dostert, Marcel; Otte, Volker; Neubauer, Peter (May 2022). "Lichen cell factories: methods for the isolation of photobiont and mycobiont partners for defined pure and co-cultivation". Microbial Cell Factories. 21 (1): 80. doi:10.1186/s12934-022-01804-6. PMC 9082883. PMID 35534897.
