= Harusavskia =

Scientific classification
- Kingdom: Fungi
- Division: Ascomycota
- Class: Lecanoromycetes
- Order: Teloschistales
- Family: Teloschistaceae
- Genus: Harusavskia; S.Y.Kondr. (2017)
- Species: H. elenkinianoides

Binomial name
- Harusavskia elenkinianoides S.Y.Kondr., X.Yuan Wang, S.O.Oh & Hur (2017)
- Holotype site: Laguna del Maule, Chile

Species of lichen

Harusavskia is single-species fungal genus in the family Teloschistaceae. It contains the little-known species Harusavskia elenkinianoides, a saxicolous (rock-dwelling), crustose lichen. This species is known only from its original collection site near the Laguna del Maule in Chile.

== Taxonomy ==
Harusavskia elenkinianoides was formally described as a new species in 2017. The type specimen was collected from the Laguna del Maule in Chile at an elevation of 1,887 m (6,191 ft), where it was found growing on siliceous rock. The genus name derives its name from two key characteristics. Firstly, it references the distinctive "halo" around the ascospores, a key feature in its spore structure. Secondly, the name pays homage to its resemblance to Rusavskia elegans, to which this lichen was first included. The species epithet alludes to a resemblance with Elenkiniana gomerana, a lichen found in the Canary Islands. Phylogenetically, genus Harusavskia is in the Filsoniana clade of the subfamily Teloschistoideae in the family Teloschistaceae.

== Description ==
In the genus Harusavskia, the thallus is areolate at the centre, meaning it has a cracked, patchy appearance, and transitions to a lobate form at the edges with well-defined lobes. The colour of the thallus ranges from yellow-brownish orange to brownish yellow-orange. The outer, or peripheral, portions are either matt or slightly shiny, featuring relatively few pseudocyphellae – small, white, porous spots. In contrast, the central area has numerous pseudocyphellae, giving it an eroded appearance with a whitish-brownish yellow-orange hue. The thallus can grow to a diameter of several centimetres.

The apothecia (fruiting bodies) of Harusavskia are typically 0.4 to 1.3 mm in diameter and about 0.5 mm thick. They are lecanorine in form. This means they have a thalline exciple – a rim that is similar in composition to the thallus – coloured yellowish-brownish orange, and a disc that is usually flat and dark brownish brick-orange. The true exciple, the layer just outside the reproductive cells, has a complex or globular cellular structure with very thin cell walls. The thalline exciple's cortical layer is composed of densely packed cells. The subhymenium, the layer below the hymenium, contains numerous oil droplets. The asci (spore-bearing cells) typically contain eight spores. These spores are simple, with an undeveloped or only partially developed septum (a dividing wall), visible only in their early stages. They are surrounded by a distinct halo that is 1 to 1.2 (up to 1.5) μm wide when treated with a solution of potassium hydroxide.

Chemically, Harusavskia reacts distinctly to potassium hydroxide solution (i.e., the K spot test). The thallus turns purple, while the epihymenium(the top layer above the hymenium) and the cortical layer of the thalline exciple change to a bright crimson purple. The cortex of the thalline section reacts by turning bluish, violet, or ink-purple.

== Habitat and distribution ==
At the time of its original publication, Harusavskia elenkinianoides was known to occur only at its type locality in Chile, where it grows on siliceous rock.
