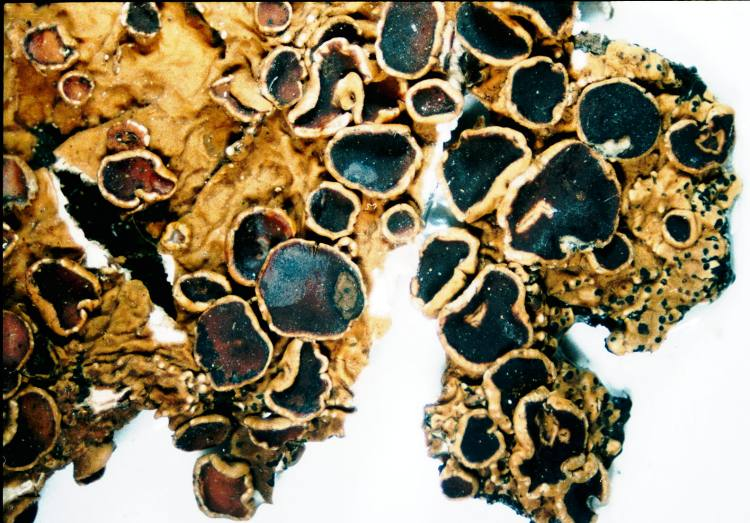
- Omphalora arizonica

Conservation status
- Critically Imperiled (NatureServe)

Scientific classification
- Kingdom: Fungi
- Division: Ascomycota
- Class: Lecanoromycetes
- Order: Lecanorales
- Family: Parmeliaceae
- Genus: Omphalora; T.H.Nash & Hafellner (1990)
- Species: O. arizonica

Binomial name
- Omphalora arizonica (Tuck. ex Willey) T.H.Nash & Hafellner (1990)

= Omphalora =

Lichen genus

Omphalora is a fungal genus in the family Parmeliaceae. The genus is monotypic, containing the single species Omphalora arizonica, a foliose lichen found in North America.

== Taxonomy ==
The genus Omphalora was established in 1990 by Thomas Hawkes Nash III and Josef Hafellner to accommodate Omphalodium arizonicum, which had previously been classified under various genera including Omphalodium, Parmelia, and Lecanora. The type species is Omphalora arizonica.

Omphalora is distinguished from related genera like Omphalodium, Rhizoplaca, and Xanthomaculina by several key characteristics:

- Morphology: The thallus has rounded ridges (less than 1 mm high) and small pseudocyphellae centered in papillae. The lower surface features irregular sharp-edged ridges and distinctive finger-like outgrowths.
- Anatomy: The upper cortex is prosoplectenchymatous, with strongly developed radial support tissue in the medulla. The genus shows Type III development of radial support tissue.
- Chemistry: The upper cortex contains usnic acid and lacks brown pigments, while the cell walls contain isolichenin. The medulla contains norstictic acid.
- Reproductive structures: The asci lack both outer and inner flaps during spore discharge, unlike related genera. The pycnidia have blue-green to green-black ostioles.

While originally suggested to belong in the Umbilicariaceae due to its umbilicate growth form, Omphalora is now placed in the Parmeliaceae based on its lecanorine apothecia and other developmental characters. It represents a geographically restricted genus found only in upper montane conifer forests of Arizona, Colorado, and New Mexico in North America.

The generic name combines elements suggesting its umbilicate growth form and relationship to other similar lichen genera.

== Habitat and distribution ==
Omphalora arizonica is endemic to the southwestern United States, where it is restricted to high-elevation areas in Arizona, Colorado, and New Mexico. Unlike its widespread relative Rhizoplaca, which can be found worldwide, O. arizonica occupies a comparatively small geographic range. The species occurs in upper montane environments within mixed conifer forest ecosystems. It grows on exposed rocky outcrops at elevations ranging from approximately 2,750 to 3,500 m (9,020 to 11,480 ft). Collection sites include the Santa Rita Mountains of Arizona, the Sandia Mountains and Sacramento Mountains of New Mexico, and areas near Creede, Colorado. The species has been documented growing on various rock substrates including volcanic rock and rhyolite.

This lichen's specific habitat requirements, which combine high elevation, exposed rock surfaces, and the particular environmental conditions of southwestern mountain ranges, make it a characteristic species of the American Southwest's montane environments. Its distribution pattern suggests an adaptation to the distinct climatic conditions found in these upper elevation mixed conifer forests.
