= Coelopogon =

Scientific classification
- Domain: Eukaryota
- Kingdom: Fungi
- Division: Ascomycota
- Class: Lecanoromycetes
- Order: Lecanorales
- Family: Parmeliaceae
- Genus: Coelopogon; Brusse & Kärnefelt (1991)

Type species
- Coelopogon abraxas Brusse (1991)

Species
- C. abraxas C. epiphorellus

Genus of lichen

Coelopogon is a genus of lichen-forming fungi in the family Parmeliaceae. The genus contains two species found in southern South America and South Africa.

== Taxonomy ==
Coelopogon was circumscribed in 1991 by lichenologists Franklin Andrej Brusse and Ingvar Kärnefelt, with C. abraxas assigned as the type species.

Coelopogon was originally a segregate of genus Cetraria, and was grouped with the so-called "cetrarioid" lichens (lichens that are erect foliose form and have marginal apothecia and pycnidia). Kärnefelt had in fact treated this genus under Coelocaulon, a genus that is now considered to be synonymous with Cetraria. DNA-based molecular phylogenetic analysis has shown, however, that there is no close relationship between the two genera. Coelopogon does not align with any of the distinct clades that have been identified in the Parmeliaceae, and is grouped with the "genera of uncertain affinities".

== Description ==
Coelopogon has an erect fruticose growth form, it has medullary bundles of periclinal hyphae (i.e, parallel to the surface), and it lacks pseudocyphellae. Coelopogon species produce the secondary compounds epiphorellic acids 1 and 2. C. abraxas makes isidiate soralia, while C. epiphorellus makes clustered coralloid isidia, and soredia are absent. Coelopogon abraxas also makes epiphorellic acid 3.

== Species ==
- Coelopogon abraxas Brusse (1991) – South Africa; South America (Chile)
- Coelopogon epiphorellus (Nyl.) Brusse & Kärnefelt (1991) – South Africa; South America (Argentina, Chile, Falkland Islands); Antarctica
