= Parmotremopsis =

Scientific classification
- Domain: Eukaryota
- Kingdom: Fungi
- Division: Ascomycota
- Class: Lecanoromycetes
- Order: Lecanorales
- Family: Parmeliaceae
- Genus: Parmotremopsis; Elix & Hale (1987)

Type species
- Parmotremopsis antillensis (Nyl.) Elix & Hale (1987)

Species
- P. antillensis P. phlyctina P. uruguayensis

Genus of lichens

Parmotremopsis is a genus of lichen-forming fungi in the family Parmeliaceae. The genus was circumscribed in 1987 by lichenologists John Elix and Mason Hale.

== Species ==
- Parmotremopsis antillensis (Nyl.) Elix & Hale (1987)
- Parmotremopsis phlyctina (Hale) Elix & Hale (1987)
- Parmotremopsis uruguayensis Kurok. & Osorio (2002)
