= Plasticolous lichen =

A plasticolous lichenized fungus is a lichen that grows on plastic surfaces. This behaviour was first observed in 1994 when foliicolous (leaf-dwelling) lichens were found growing on plastic tape but they have since been observed growing on artificial plastic leaves, plastic signs and nylon nets. The phenomenon of lichens growing on artificial substrates, including plastics, is part of a broader category sometimes referred to as "omnicolous" lichens – those capable of colonizing various manufactured materials including ropes, glass, leather, metals, concrete, and brick.

A study conducted in the Garhwal Himalaya region of India documented 19 species of lichens colonizing a 15-year-old nylon net house at an altitude of 2,700 m (8,900 ft). Of these, 12 species were reported for the first time as plasticolous lichen mycota from India, and 9 species were documented as plasticolous for the first time globally. The family Parmeliaceae dominated the findings with eight species, followed by Physciaceae with seven species. Other families represented included Candelariaceae, Chrysotrichaceae, Collemataceae, and Ramalinaceae. The genus Heterodermia was most prevalent, followed by Parmotrema and Phaeophyscia.
