= Pachyascus =

Scientific classification
- Domain: Eukaryota
- Kingdom: Fungi
- Division: Ascomycota
- Class: Lecanoromycetes
- Order: Lecanorales
- Family: Pachyascaceae; Poelt ex P.M.Kirk, P.F.Cannon & J.C.David (2001)
- Genus: Pachyascus; Poelt & Hertel (1968)
- Species: P. lapponicus

Binomial name
- Pachyascus lapponicus Poelt & Hertel (1968)

Species of lichen

Pachyascus is the sole genus in the family Pachyascaceae. It contains a single species, the lichen Pachyascus lapponicus. Both the genus and species were described as new to science in 1968 by lichenologists Josef Poelt and Hannes Hertel. P. lapponicus was originally collected from Lapland, a province in northern Sweden. The lichen has several unusual characteristics: it grows exclusively along with the rock moss Andreaea, it bears goniocyst-like parts (goniocysts are small aggregations of photobiont cells surrounded by fungal hyphae) and produces tiny apothecia that stand in the leaf axils of the moss, and it has thick asci.

Poelt and Hertel thought the species occupied a basal position in the order Lecanorales, and Poelt tentatively placed it in its own family, Pachyascaceae in a 1974 publication. This family was formally published in 2001. In 2020, it was classed within the Lecanoromycetidae but within uncertain order placement.

Another lichen, which bears a superficial resemblance in the ascomata, was once placed in Pachyascus as P. byssaceus (Vězda) Vězda (1970); it is now known as Vezdaea aestivalis.
