= Oevstedalia =

Scientific classification
- Kingdom: Fungi
- Division: Ascomycota
- Subdivision: Pezizomycotina
- Genus: Oevstedalia; Ertz & Diederich (2004)
- Species: O. antarctica

Binomial name
- Oevstedalia antarctica (C.W.Dodge) Ertz & Diederich (2004)

Synonyms
- Trimmatothelopsis antarctica C.W.Dodge (1968)

Single-species fungal genus

Oevstedalia is a genus of fungi of uncertain placement in the subphylum Pezizomycotina. This is a monotypic genus, containing the single lichen species Oevstedalia antarctica. The genus was created in 2004 to accommodate a unique Antarctic lichen that was previously misclassified, and it was named in honour of the Norwegian scientist Dag Olav Øvstedal who made key observations about the species. This lichen is distinctive for its jelly-like, translucent reddish-brown crust and its unusual method of reproduction, where spores are packaged in tiny mucilage balls within larger spore sacs—a reproductive strategy not found in any other lichen.

== Taxonomy ==
The monotypic genus Oevstedalia was introduced in 2004 by Damien Ertz and Paul Diederich during their revision of Trimmatothele and Trimmatothelopsis. They demonstrated that Trimmatothelopsis antarctica is unrelated to Verrucaria and therefore required generic separation, creating the new combination Oevstedalia antarctica, which they fixed as the type species. The name commemorates the Norwegian lichenologist Dag Olav Øvstedal, whose field observations of ascoconidia were pivotal to the discovery.

Ertz and Diederich diagnosed the genus by its gelatinous, translucent, homoiomerous thallus with a unicellular green photobiont; pale to medium reddish-brown perithecia lacking any carbonised (blackened) involucrellum; a perithecial wall of loosely interwoven hyphae; abundant, branched pseudoparaphyses; and sparse, hair-like interascal filaments. The exceedingly large, thin-walled asci turn blue in potassium iodide stain (K/I⁺) and, while still living, each encloses eight mucilage-bound "conidial balls" that disintegrate to release numerous oblong ascoconidia. This ascoconidial mode of asexual reproduction is unique among lichens and immediately separates Oevstedalia from superficially similar genera such as Verrucaria, Thelocarpon and members of the Acarospora complex.

Previously classified in the Dothideomycetes, Oevstedalia was moved to Pezizomycotina incertae sedis due to the lack of DNA data available for the genus.

== Description ==
Oevstedalia forms a thin, gelatinous crust that clings to wood, rock or even old whale bones. The surface is pale reddish-brown, translucent and slightly glossy, breaking into small irregular patches when it dries . Unlike many crustose lichens, its inner structure is homoiomerous—the green algal partners are mixed evenly with the fungal filaments rather than arranged in separate layers. Because there is no protective outer "skin" (cortex) or distinct internal medulla, the thallus looks almost glassy when viewed in section . The algal cells are single-celled spheres 6.5–14 micrometres (μm) across and usually sit in small groups inside a clear mucilage sheath, a feature that gives the whole crust its jelly-like consistency.

Reproductive bodies (perithecia) appear as tiny, shining dots that start buried within the crust and then push outward, becoming half-exposed at maturity. They are roughly spherical, 0.3–0.4 mm wide and share the thallus's reddish-brown colour rather than turning the deep black typical of many "wart lichens". Each perithecium is walled by a loose mesh of minute hyphae (termed textura intricata), and its interior is packed with slender, branched threads called pseudoparaphyses that keep the spore sacs apart. The asci themselves are unusually large—up to 250 μm long—but paper-thin, and they stain bright blue when treated with iodine after a brief alkaline soak. Sparse hair-fine filaments weave among the asci, yet they are so delicate that they are hard to see in dead material.

In living specimens, every ascus encloses eight tiny mucilage packets, each stuffed with dozens of colourless, oblong ascospores only 3.7–4.5 μm long; when the packets burst, the spores—technically called ascoconidia—are released in a cloud. This internal "spore-within-a-spore" strategy is unique among lichens and sets Oevstedalia apart from superficially similar genera such as Verrucaria or Thelocarpon, which lack ascoconidia and show darker, more carbonised fruiting walls.
