= Aridoplaca =

Scientific classification
- Kingdom: Fungi
- Division: Ascomycota
- Class: Lecanoromycetes
- Order: Teloschistales
- Family: Teloschistaceae
- Genus: Aridoplaca; Wilk, Pabijan & Lücking (2021)
- Species: A. peltata

Binomial name
- Aridoplaca peltata Wilk & Lücking (2021)

Species of lichen

Aridoplaca is a fungal genus in the family Teloschistaceae. It is a monotypic genus, containing the single saxicolous (rock-dwelling) squamulose lichen species Aridoplaca peltata, found in South America. This lichen forms vivid orange-red, scaly patches on rocks in the high-elevation deserts of the Andes mountains, where it endures extreme conditions including intense solar radiation and arid climates. It is recognized by its shield-like scales and abundant small, reddish fruiting bodies that give it a wart-like appearance.

== Taxonomy ==
The genus was circumscribed in 2021 by Karina Wilk, Maciej Pabijan, and Robert Lücking, following molecular phylogenetic analysis that showed the species occupies a distinct lineage in the subfamily Xanthorioideae of the Teloschistaceae The species epithet peltata refers to the squamulose and peltate thallus, while the genus name refers to the habitat of the lichen, which occurs in arid areas of Bolivia and Peru. It grows in well-lit areas on siliceous rocks at altitudes between 3,500 and 4,500 m (11,500 and 14,800 ft).

== Description ==
Aridoplaca forms a squamulose, or scaly, thallus that is made up of small, shield-like lobes known as peltate squamules. These squamules usually merge together into rounded patches 1.5–4 mm wide, with downturned and sometimes scalloped margins. The thallus is relatively thick, about 0.45–0.5 mm, and has a vivid orange-red coloration caused by anthraquinone pigments; under chemical spot tests (K), it reacts purple. Unlike some lichens, it lacks a prothallus (a distinct fungal border), vegetative propagules, and visible reproductive structures. Its outer layer, or cortex, is unusually thick and uneven, with small cone-like projections. Inside, the algal partner (a green alga with spherical (globose) cells 5–17 μm across) is not evenly distributed but occurs in clustered groups.

The reproductive structures (apothecia) are abundant and often crowded, giving the thallus a reddish, wart-like appearance. These fruiting bodies start out immersed within the thallus but later break through the surface. They are small, 0.2–0.8 mm across, with discs that are first concave and later flatten out, colored red to orange-red and reacting purple with potassium hydroxide. The margins are initially visible but become level with the disc as the apothecia mature. The internal tissues of the apothecia are made up of tightly packed fungal cells (paraplectenchyma) and contain the same orange pigments as the thallus. The spore-producing layer (hymenium) is about 95–100 μm thick, supported by a clear base (hypothecium) that may contain oil droplets. The paraphyses (sterile filaments between spore sacs) are simple to slightly branched at the tips. Each ascus bears eight ascospores.

The ascospores are hyaline (colorless), ellipsoid, and divided into two chambers by a thick central wall—a type known as polarilocular. They measure about 10–15 by 6–9 μm, with the septum 3–5 μm thick. In addition to sexual reproduction, the lichen also produces asexual structures called pycnidia, which are tiny, flask-shaped cavities embedded in the thallus. These release minute spores (conidia) that are rod-shaped or oval, measuring 2–4 by 1 μm.

== Habitat and distribution ==
Aridoplaca peltata is restricted to high-elevation, semiarid regions of the central Andes. It occurs in open, well-lit sites between about 3,500 and 4,100 meters elevation, where it grows directly on siliceous rock surfaces. The species has been recorded from southern Peru, in the Arequipa Department, and from neighboring parts of Bolivia, particularly in Potosí Department near volcanic and rocky desert landscapes. Field collections have been made in semidesert valleys and on exposed slopes, often in areas with sparse vegetation cover and intense solar radiation.
