= Thermutopsis =

Scientific classification
- Kingdom: Fungi
- Division: Ascomycota
- Class: Lichinomycetes
- Order: Lichinales
- Family: Lichinaceae
- Genus: Thermutopsis; Henssen (1990)
- Species: T. jamesii

Binomial name
- Thermutopsis jamesii Henssen (1990)

Single-species fungal genus

Thermutopsis is a fungal genus in the family Lichinaceae. It is a monospecific genus, containing the single species Thermutopsis jamesii, a little-known lichen. The lichen was discovered in 1990 on shaded limestone rocks in Antigua and forms blackish, thread-like structures with globe-shaped fruiting bodies. Molecular studies suggest this unusual lichen may not belong in its current family and could represent an entirely different evolutionary lineage.

== Taxonomy ==
The genus Thermutopsis was circumscribed in 1990 by the German lichenologist Aino Henssen to accommodate a single, morphologically distinctive species, Thermutopsis jamesii. The holotype specimen, collected by Peter Wilfred James on shaded calcareous rock at Soldier Point, Half Moon Bay (Antigua), is housed in the Natural History Museum, London (BM), with an isotype (duplicate) in the Marburg herbarium (MB). Henssen coined the generic name to signal its superficial resemblance to Thermutis while emphasising its separate lineage within the family Lichinaceae. Her diagnosis rested on the combination of a blackish, filamentous thallus inhabited by Tolypothrix (Nostocales) cyanobacteria, thallinocarpous ascocarps that originate inside the gelatinous algal sheath, and prototunicate, non-amyloid, eight-spored asci.

In erecting the new genus, Henssen distinguished Thermutopsis from Thermutis (and other lichinaceous genera) by the way its reproductive structures develop. In T. jamesii the algal filament twists around a compact hyphal strand that swells into a globe-shaped ascocarp with protruding algal branch tips, whereas Thermutis produces pycnoascocarps with a well-defined excipulum and thin paraphyses. The unusual, thick-walled paraphyses and the iodine-positive hymenial gel further support generic separation. Although Henssen viewed the partnership between the fungus and its cyanobiont as an early or developing form of lichenisation, she concluded—on account of its ascus type, pycnidial morphology, and overall anatomy—that the taxon is best placed in Lichinaceae as a monotypic genus, a position retained in subsequent classifications.

Recent molecular phylogenetics work has cast doubt on whether Thermutopsis truly belongs in the Lichinomycetes at all. A wide-ranging phylogenetic reassessment of the class published in 2024 could not include T. jamesii because no suitable DNA could be obtained, so the genus was left out of the resulting tree. Nevertheless, the authors examined Henssen's anatomical notes and concluded that the supposed "thallinocarps" of Thermutopsis share little with those of Lichinella or Gonotichia. They also pointed to the unusual, sharply pointed paraphyses—which resemble those of the unrelated cyanolichen family Coccocarpiaceae (Peltigerales, Lecanoromycetes)—as further evidence that the genus may sit outside the Lichinomycetes.

Because firm molecular data are still lacking, Thermutopsis was provisionally retained in the Lichinaceae "mostly because of the filamentous cyanobionts", but the study urged that its placement be revisited once fresh collections allow sequencing. Until such material is obtained, the genus remains an enigmatic outlier—recognised for its distinctive morphology yet acknowledged as taxonomically uncertain within the current family framework.
