= Melanophloea =

Scientific classification
- Kingdom: Fungi
- Division: Ascomycota
- Class: incertae sedis
- Order: incertae sedis
- Family: incertae sedis
- Genus: Melanophloea
- Species: M. pacifica

Binomial name
- Melanophloea pacifica P. James & Vezda

Genus of lichen

Melanophloea is a genus of lichenized fungi in the division Ascomycota. As of November 2022, it had not been placed into a specific family, class or class, and its relationship to other Ascomycota genera remains uncertain. It is a monotypic genus, containing the single species Melanophloea pacifica. Other species formerly assigned to this genus have been reassigned elsewhere.
