= Follmannia =

Scientific classification
- Domain: Eukaryota
- Kingdom: Fungi
- Division: Ascomycota
- Class: Lecanoromycetes
- Order: Teloschistales
- Family: Teloschistaceae
- Genus: Follmannia; C.W.Dodge (1967)

Type species
- Follmannia rufa C.W.Dodge (1967)

Species
- F. orthoclada F. rufa F. suborthoclada

Genus of lichens

Follmannia is a genus of lichen-forming fungi in the family Teloschistaceae. It has three species. All three species are crustose lichens, and all occur in South America.

== Taxonomy ==
The genus was circumscribed in 1967 by Carroll William Dodge, with the Chilean Follmannia rufa assigned as the type species. Follmannia is in the subfamily Teloschistoideae of the family Teloschistaceae.

== Description ==
The thallus of Follmannia has a crustose growth form characterized by well-developed, elongated, predominantly narrow, and slightly raised lobes. These lobes often have a subtle shine. The cortex, the outer layer of the lichen's body, is complex, composed of intricately arranged prosoplectenchymatous cells, and is accompanied by a thick epicortex. The medulla, the innermost part of the thallus, is densely packed.

The reproductive structures, known as apothecia, have a distinctive appearance. They are zeorine in form and feature intricately arranged prosoplectenchymatous tissue in the form of a thick excipulum. Within these apothecia, spores are present, characterized as ellipsoid in shape and having a polaridiblastic structure. These spores are relatively small and contain short to medium septa, or partitions. Pycnidia, which are specialized structures responsible for asexual reproduction, are not commonly found in this lichen. When present, they are slightly protruding from the thallus. Within these pycnidia, bacilliform conidia, or elongated rod-shaped spore-like structures, are present.

Fragilin is the only lichen product known to occur in the genus.

== Species ==
As of September 2023, Species Fungorum (in the Catalogue of Life) accepts three species of Follmania:

- Follmannia orthoclada (Zahlbr.) Frödén, Arup & Søchting (2013) – Chile
- Follmannia rufa C.W.Dodge (1967) – Chile
- Follmannia suborthoclada S.Y.Kondr. & Hur (2020) - Chile

Arup and colleagues suggest that Follmannia rufa is a taxonomic synonym of F. orthoclada.
