= Rehmanniella =

Scientific classification
- Domain: Eukaryota
- Kingdom: Fungi
- Division: Ascomycota
- Class: Lecanoromycetes
- Order: Teloschistales
- Family: Teloschistaceae
- Genus: Rehmanniella; S.Y.Kondr. & Hur (2018)

Type species
- Rehmanniella wirthii S.Y.Kondr. (2018)

Species
- R. leucoxantha R. poeltiana R. subgyalectoides R. syvashica R. wirthii

Genus of lichens

Rehmanniella is a genus of lichen-forming fungi in the family Teloschistaceae. It contains five species of saxicolous (rock-dwelling) crustose lichens. The genus was circumscribed by lichenologists Sergey Kondratyuk and Jae-Seoun Hur in 2018. The genus name honours Polish geographer, geomorphologist, botanist and explorer Anton Rehmann (1840–1917), who collected bryophytes and vascular plants in South Africa. The genus was originally circumscribed with Rehmanniella wirthii assigned as the type and only species. Four additional species were added to the genus in 2020.

== Description ==
The thallus of Rehmanniella is a crust-like structure that can be either continuous or areolate, starting off as thin and becoming more prominent over time. It has a grey or yellowish-grey hue and often blends seamlessly with its underlying surface. The lichen has a plethora of reddish-orange reproductive structures known as biatorine apothecia. These apothecia range between 0.2 and 0.7 mm in diameter, transitioning from being embedded to standing out on the surface. Their edges have shades ranging from a muted orange to a dark reddish hue, often with a white powdery coating (pruina). The core of the apothecia has a layered structure with a crystalline section and a foundational part resembling the Blastenia-type. These reproductive structures do not have an algal layer. Within, the thread-like structures, called paraphyses, show a dense branching pattern towards their top. The underneath layer appears clear and is dotted with oil droplets. The structures responsible for spore production, asci, typically contain eight spores, which are elongated and infrequently seen in their mature state.

== Species ==
As of October 2023, Species Fungorum (in the Catalogue of Life) accepts five species of Rehmanniella:

- Rehmanniella leucoxantha (Müll.Arg.) S.Y.Kondr. (2020)
- Rehmanniella poeltiana S.Y.Kondr. & Hur (2020) – Chile
- Rehmanniella subgyalectoides (S.Y.Kondr. & Kärnefelt) S.Y.Kondr. (2020)
- Rehmanniella syvashica (Khodos., Vondrák & Šoun) S.Y.Kondr. (2020)
- Rehmanniella wirthii S.Y.Kondr. (2018) – South Africa
