= Gymnographa =

Scientific classification
- Domain: Eukaryota
- Kingdom: Fungi
- Division: Ascomycota
- Class: Lecanoromycetes
- Order: Graphidales
- Family: Graphidaceae
- Genus: Gymnographa; Müll.Arg. (1887)

Type species
- Gymnographa medusulina Müll.Arg. (1887)

Species
- G. eludens G. medusulina

Genus of lichen-forming fungi

Gymnographa is a genus of lichen-forming fungi in the family Graphidaceae. It contains two species.

== Species ==
- Gymnographa eludens (Stirt.) Staiger (2002)
- Gymnographa medusulina Müll.Arg. (1887)
