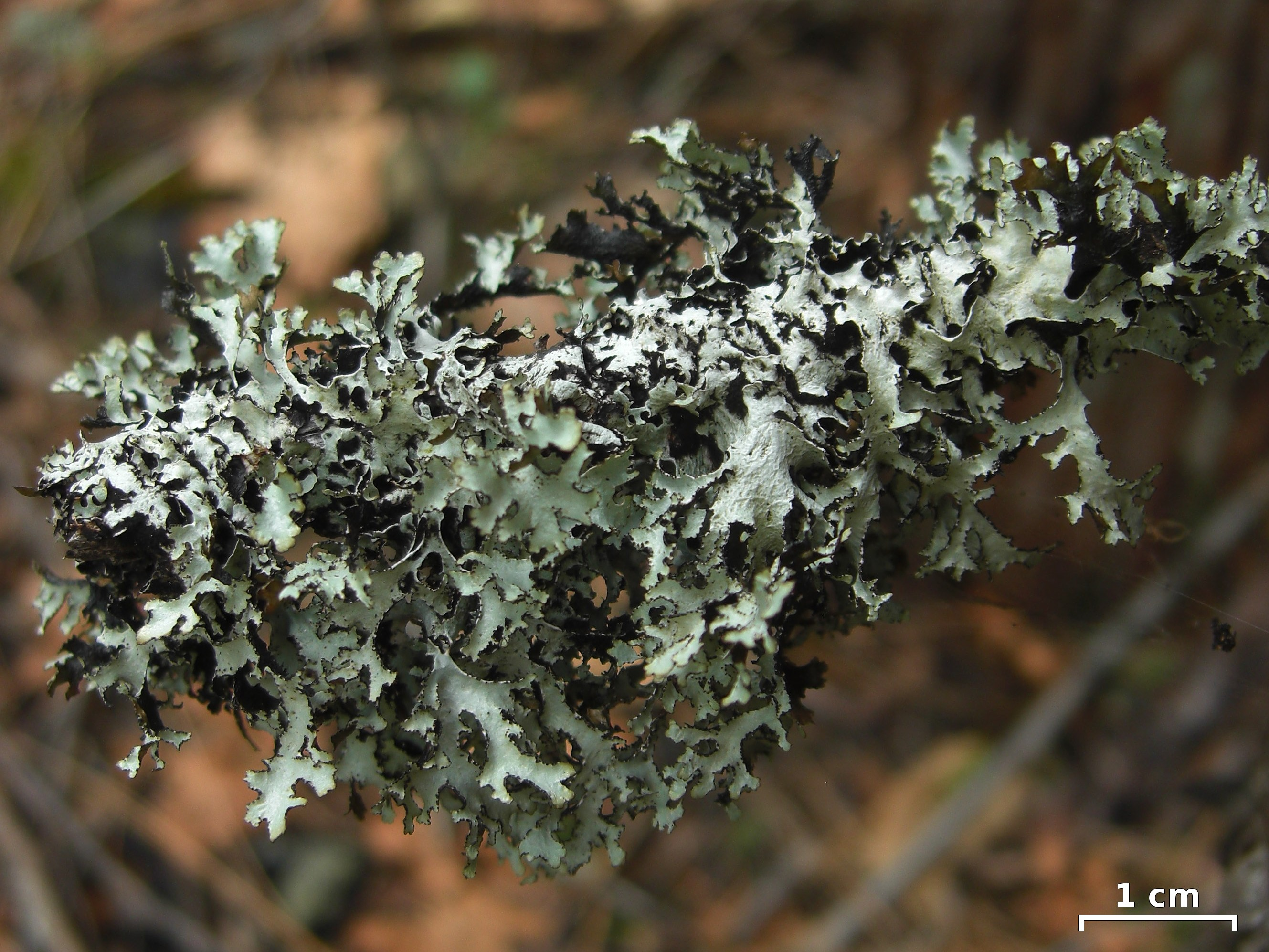
- E. idahoensis in Castle Crags, California

Conservation status
- Secure (NatureServe)

Scientific classification
- Kingdom: Fungi
- Division: Ascomycota
- Class: Lecanoromycetes
- Order: Lecanorales
- Family: Parmeliaceae
- Genus: Esslingeriana; Hale & M.J.Lai (1980)
- Species: E. idahoensis

Binomial name
- Esslingeriana idahoensis (Essl.) Hale & M.J.Lai (1980)

= Esslingeriana =

Single-species genus of lichen

Esslingeriana is a fungal genus in the family Parmeliaceae. The genus is monotypic, containing the single foliose lichen species Esslingeriana idahoensis, commonly known as the tinted rag lichen. It is found in northwestern North America.

== Systematics ==
Esslingeriana idahoensis was originally described by Theodore Esslinger in 1971 as a member of genus Cetraria. He collected the type specimen from Mount Spokane State Park (Spokane County, Washington). Widely distributed in northwestern North America, E. idahoensis is named for its abundance in the douglas fir forests of the northern Idaho.

Genus Esslingeriana was circumscribed in 1980 by lichenologists Mason Hale and Ming-Jou Lai. Molecular phylogenetic studies have shown that Esslingeriana is in the cetrarioid clade of the Parmeliaceae. Cetrarioid lichens are those that are erect, foliose (leafy), and with apothecia and pycnidia (sexual and asexual reproductive structures, respectively) that are largely restricted to the margins of the lobes. Esslingeriana, along with the genera Dactylina and Melanelia, are the earliest-diverging members of the cetrarioid clade.

== Description ==
Esslingeriana idahoensis is a pale gray (sometimes with a yellowish tint), foliose (leafy) lichen that is loosely attached to its substrate. The thallus comprises individual elongated lobes measuring 1.5–5 mm (0.06–0.20 in) wide. The thallus surface lacks isidia, soredia, and pseudocyphellae. The lower thallus surface is black and wrinkled, with sparse and scattered, unbranched rhizines that function as holdfasts to attach the thallus to the substrate. Ascomata are in the form of large brown apothecia, typically located at the tips of the lobes.

The expected results of standard chemical spot tests in the cortex are PD+ (pale yellow), K+ (yellow), KC−, and C−; in the medulla they are PD−, K+ (purplish pink), KC−, and C−. Esslingeriana idahoensis contains the secondary chemicals atranorin and endocrocin.
