= Pachypeltis =

Scientific classification
- Kingdom: Fungi
- Division: Ascomycota
- Class: Lecanoromycetes
- Order: Teloschistales
- Family: Teloschistaceae
- Genus: Pachypeltis; Søchting, Arup & Frödén (2013)

Type species
- Pachypeltis castellana (Räsänen) Søchting, Frödén & Arup (2013)

Species
- P. castellana P. cladodes P. insularis P. intrudens P. pachythallina P. phoenicopta

Genus of lichens

Pachypeltis is a genus of lichen-forming fungi in the family Teloschistaceae. It comprises six species.

== Taxonomy ==
The genus was circumscribed in 2013 by the lichenologists Ulrik Søchting, Patrik Frödén, and Ulf Arup, with P. castellana assigned as the type species. The genus name means "thick shield".

== Description ==
Genus Pachypeltis includes lichens with growth forms ranging from crust-like (crustose) and cracked into distinct segments (areolate) to slightly bushy (subfruticose). These lichens are often thick and may grow on other lichens (lichenicolous), particularly those found on rocks (saxicolous lichens). However, most species in this genus are adapted to dry, continental steppe climates, where they grow on soil or soil-covered rocks, forming tightly attached, small, crusty patches called areoles.

The outer layer of the lichen, called the cortex, consists of densely packed cells (paraplectenchymatous) or possibly a specialised type of cortex (phenocortex). Their fruiting bodies, known as apothecia, are typically cup-shaped (zeorine) and contain anthraquinone compounds, which often give the disc of the apothecia a darker colouration. The spores are two-celled (polaridiblastic), with a dividing wall (septum) that is short to moderately long. Structures called pycnidia, which produce asexual spores, have not been observed in this genus.

== Species ==
- Pachypeltis castellana (Räsänen) Søchting, Frödén & Arup (2013)
- Pachypeltis cladodes (Tuck.) Søchting, Frödén & Arup (2013)
- Pachypeltis insularis (Poelt) Vondrák & I.V.Frolov (2019)
- Pachypeltis intrudens (H.Magn.) Søchting, Frödén & Arup (2013)
- Pachypeltis pachythallina (Poelt & Hinter.) Vondrák (2019)
- Pachypeltis phoenicopta (Poelt & Hinter.) Vondrák (2019)

Pachypeltis invadens Søchting, Frödén & Arup (2013) is a species that was proposed but was not validly published because it was based on Caloplaca invadens Lynge (1928), which itself was never validly published due to missing required details. As a result, the name does not meet the formal rules for naming under the International Code of Nomenclature.
