= Paratopeliopsis =

Scientific classification
- Domain: Eukaryota
- Kingdom: Fungi
- Division: Ascomycota
- Class: Lecanoromycetes
- Order: Graphidales
- Family: Graphidaceae
- Genus: Paratopeliopsis; Merc.-Díaz, Lücking & Parnmen (2014)
- Species: P. caraibica

Binomial name
- Paratopeliopsis caraibica Merc.-Díaz, Lücking & Parnmen (2014)

Species of lichen

Paratopeliopsis is a single-species fungal genus in the family Graphidaceae. It contains the species Paratopeliopsis caraibica, a corticolous (bark-dwelling), leprose lichen found in Puerto Rico's forests, where it cohabits with mosses on tree trunks. This lichen sets itself apart from other species in the tribe Thelotremateae, particularly those within the genus Topeliopsis, primarily due to its flour-like (farinose) thallus and its comparatively small, brown spores.

== Taxonomy ==
The genus Paratopeliopsis was circumscribed in 2014 by lichenologists Joel Mercado-Díaz, Robert Lücking, and Sittiporn Parnmen. The genus name alludes to its similarity to the ascomata of the genus Topeliopsis, despite the two being only distantly related. The species epithet caraibica makes reference to an expected distribution throughout the Caribbean. The type specimen was found in Naguabo, Puerto Rico, specifically in the Barrio Río Blanco, on the trunk of a Cyrilla racemiflora tree. Molecular data suggested a distinct place for Paratopeliopsis caraibica within the tribe Thelotremateae, as it does not align closely with any of the currently accepted genera.

Despite the initial confusion of the authors, Paratopeliopsis caraibica is not closely related to the genus Topeliopsis. Its ascomata may appear similar to Topeliopsis, but molecular data suggests a significant genetic divergence. Further research is necessary to fully understand the boundaries of the genus and its relationship with other lichen species.

== Description ==
The thallus of Paratopeliopsis caraibica is corticolous, growing on the bark of trees and over adjacent mosses. Its continuous, flour-like surface exhibits a light greyish-green colour with a bluish tinge and can reach up to 5 cm (2 in) in diameter. The photobiont, Trentepohlia, consists of densely packed, olive-green cells that are rounded to irregular in shape. The ascomata are small, rounded, and crowded, with flesh-coloured to grey-brown discs. The ascospores are grey-brown, elliptical, three-septate, and have a length 2–3 times their width, with dimensions of 10–12 by 4–5 μm.

== Similar species ==
Paratopeliopsis caraibica was initially identified as Thelotrema byssoideum, a species native to Borneo and commonly found in tropical Southeast Asia and Australia. Both species share characteristics like a leprose thallus, small crowded ascomata, and grey-brown, three-septate ascospores. However, Thelotrema byssoideum differs in its felty thallus, larger, ornamented ascospores, and the presence of psoromic acid as a secondary compound. These differences, along with molecular data, indicate that while both species may appear similar, they belong to different tribes.

== Habitat and distribution ==
This lichen species inhabits the shady understory of the palo colorado forest within El Yunque National Forest in Puerto Rico. It has been observed growing amidst mosses on the trunk of a Cyrilla racemiflora tree, suggesting a preference for such environments.
