= Biatorellaceae =

Scientific classification
- Kingdom: Fungi
- Division: Ascomycota
- Class: Lecanoromycetes
- Family: Biatorellaceae; M.Choisy ex Hafellner & Casares (1992)

Type genus
- Biatorella De Not. (1846)

Type species
- Biatorella rousselii (Durieu & Mont.) De Not. (1846)

Family of lichens

Biatorellaceae is a family of lichen-forming fungi in the subclass Lecanoromycetidae. The family is monotypic, and contains the single genus Biatorella, which contains eight species.

Species in the genus have a cosmopolitan distribution, they are also found in northern temperate regions, especially in Europe. but also in tropical Central America, Africa and Asia (such as India). As well as Australia.

== Systematics ==
The family is classified as incertae sedis with respect to ordinal placement in the Lecanoromycetidae, as there is no reliable molecular data available to establish phylogenetic relationships with similar taxa.

Genus Biatorella was circumscribed by Italian botanist Giuseppe De Notaris in 1846, with Biatorella rousselii assigned as the type species. The family Biatorellaceae was originally proposed by French lichenologist Maurice Choisy in 1949, but he did not publish the name validly. Josef Hafellner and Manuel Casares published the name validly in 1992.

== Description ==
Biatorellaceae species are crustose lichens with a chlorococcoid photobiont partner (i.e., green algae of the genus Chlorococcum). The lichens have ascomata in the form of biatorine apothecia, which often have a reduced margin around the edge. Ascospores are ellipsoid to roughly spherical in shape, hyaline, and non-amyloid. Biatorella lichens grow on soil or bark.

== Species ==
As of November 2021, Species Fungorum accepts eight species of Biatorella:

- Biatorella australica Räsänen (1949)
- Biatorella consanguinea (Stirt.) Zahlbr. (1927)
- Biatorella desmaspora (C.Knight) Hellb. (1896)
- Biatorella epiphysa (Stirt.) Hellb. (1896)
- Biatorella fossarum (Dufour) Th.Fr. (1874)
- Biatorella hemisphaerica Anzi (1860)
- Biatorella rousselii De Not. (1846)
- Biatorella saxicola Aptroot & Sipman (2001) – Hong Kong
