= Laguna del Maule =

Lake in Maule Region, Chile

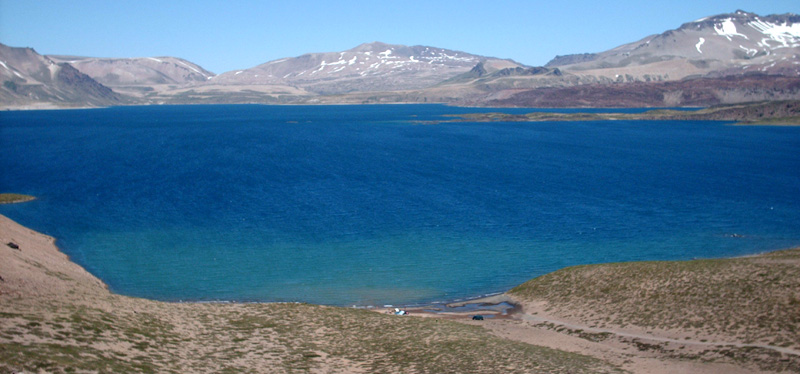
- Maule Lagoon

- Location within Chile
- Location: Maule Region
- Coordinates: 36°03′18″S 70°30′00″W
- Primary outflows: Maule River
- Basin countries: Chile
- Surface area: 68 km^{2} (26 sq mi)

Laguna del Maule (Spanish pronunciation: [laˈɣuna ðel ˈmawle]) is a lake located in the Andes of Central Chile. The lake is natural in origin, but its water level was raised by a dam inaugurated in 1957. It is located at 2,165 metres above sea level. It has a capacity of 1,420 million m^{3}.

== See also ==
- Laguna del Maule (volcano)
