= Lichens of Namibia =

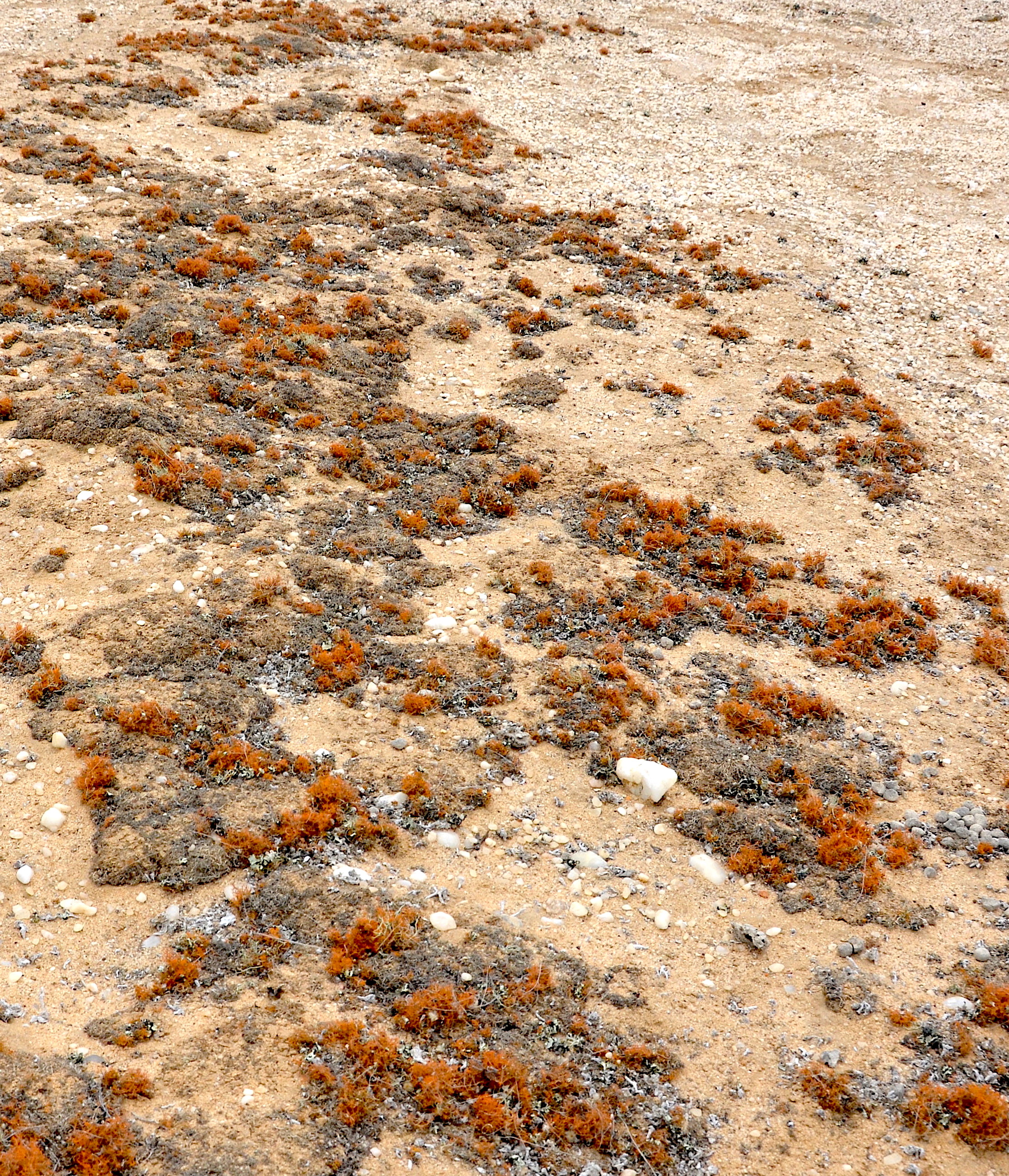
Lichens near Wlotzkasbaken

Lichens are a composite organism consisting of fungi and algae living in symbiotic relationship. They are well adapted to survive in harsh conditions. One of the many places they can be found is the Namib, the desert that gave Namibia its name. Fog in the coastal parts of the desert provides the necessary moisture for the organisms' survival. In the Namib they grow on shrubs, rocks and pebbles of the gravel plains. These small organisms can densely cover large areas, forming lichen fields.

The desert hosts 120 lichen species. Most of them are rare and a significant number of them occur only there. "Many are endemic to this region and others show affinities between the Namib lichen biota and other fog deserts of the world, such as the Atacama in South America and Baja California in Mexico and California".

Besides the Namib Desert, lichens also occur in suitable places elsewhere in Namibia, with at least 232 species recorded from the country as a whole.

== Ecological functions ==
- Soil stabilizers
- Plant succession
- Bioaccumulators that contribute to nutrient cycling in the forestry of Waterberg biosphere
- Food and habitat for other organisms

== Threats ==
Lichen vegetation is very vulnerable to pollution and mechanical damage. Lichen fields in the Namib are at risk from off-road driving and mining.

However, the Wlotzkasbaken lichen field north of Swakopmund was considered for protection after an Environmental Impact Assessment was done before the development of a desalination plant serving Trekopje uranium mine. Fourteen kilometers of fencing was erected around the northeastern side of the field to protect them from damage caused by vehicles taking shortcuts through the desert. Signs were set up by the Ministry of Environment and Tourism to announce the site location and vulnerability, including several colorful information boards on lichens. The mine also put up an information stand.
