= Apatoplaca =

Scientific classification
- Domain: Eukaryota
- Kingdom: Fungi
- Division: Ascomycota
- Class: Lecanoromycetes
- Order: Teloschistales
- Family: Teloschistaceae
- Genus: Apatoplaca; Poelt & Hafellner (1980)
- Species: A. oblongula

Binomial name
- Apatoplaca oblongula (H.Magn.) Poelt & Hafellner (1980)

Synonyms
- Caloplaca oblongula (H.Magn.) Wetmore (1995); Lecidea oblongula H.Magn. (1952)

Single-species genus of lichen

Apatoplaca is a fungal genus in the family Teloschistaceae. It is monotypic, containing a single species, the rare crustose lichen Apatoplaca oblongula, found in the United States.

== Taxonomy ==
Apatoplaca oblongula was first formally described as new to science in 1952 by Adolf Hugo Magnusson as Lecidea oblongula. In 1980, Josef Poelt and Josef Hafellner described Apatoplaca based on this species, suggesting that the lack of septa in the spores was a difference great enough to warrant a new genus. Clifford Wetmore noted in a mid-1990s publication that he had found specimens that had spores with septa, so the main character of the new genus was invalidated and he proposed that it be considered synonymous with Caloplaca. However, recent summaries of fungal and lichen classification have accepted the genus, and Apatoplaca is accepted by Species Fungorum as of October 2023.

== Description ==
Apatoplaca oblongula has a white, crust-like thallus that is embedded within the upper surface of its rock substrate. Although it lacks a cortex and a prothallus, apothecia are numerous. They are black and flat, measuring 0.3–0.7 mm (0.012–0.028 in) in diameter. Its ascospores measure 15.5–21 by 5.5–8.5 μm, and they have either a simple septum or no septa at all.

== Habitat and distribution ==
A rare species, Apatoplaca oblongula has been recorded from Utah and Colorado, where it grows on calcareous rocks.
