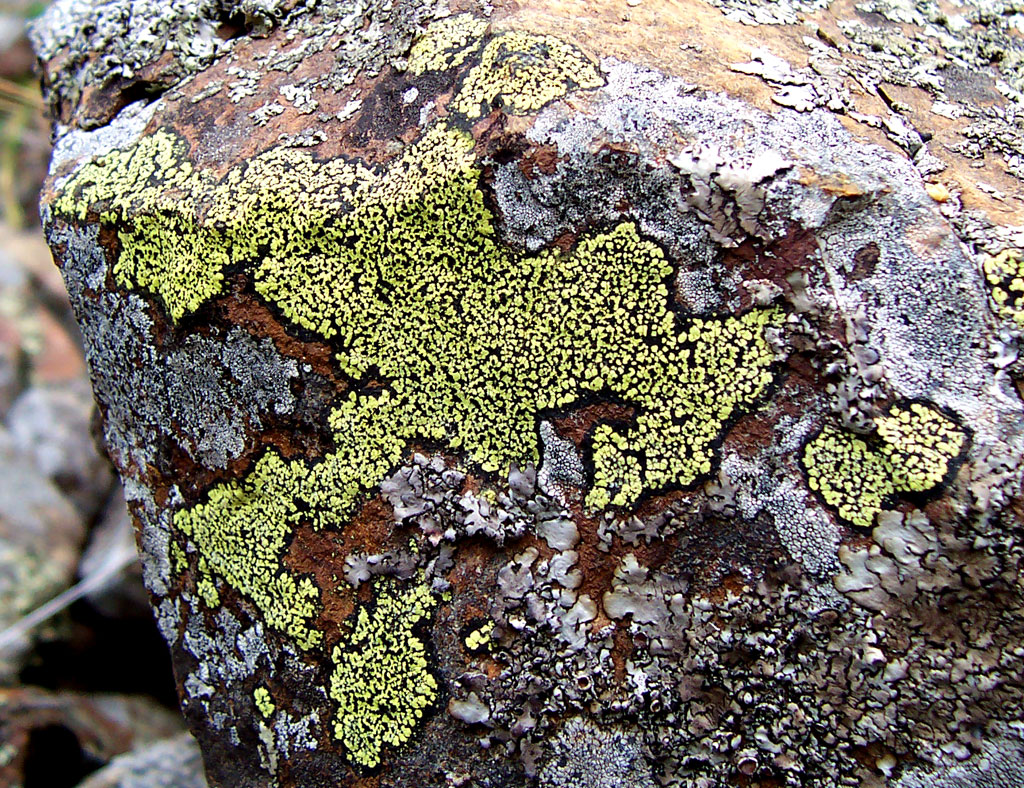
- Rhizocarpon geographicum

Scientific classification
- Kingdom: Fungi
- Division: Ascomycota
- Class: Lecanoromycetes
- Subclass: Lecanoromycetidae; P.M.Kirk, P.F.Cannon, J.C.David & Stalpers ex Miadl., Lutzoni & Lumbsch (2007)

Orders
- Caliciales; Lecanorales; Lecideales; Leprocaulales; Peltigerales; Rhizocarpales; Teloschistales; Vezdaeales; Families incertae sedis Helocarpaceae

= Lecanoromycetidae =

Subclass of fungi

The Lecanoromycetidae are a subclass of fungi in the class Lecanoromycetes. This subclass contains seven orders.

== Description ==
The Lecanoromycetidae encompass a diverse array of lichen-forming fungi whose vegetative body (thallus) can assume many forms, from crust-like films to leafy or shrubby growths. Their sexual fruiting bodies are almost always apothecia—disc- to cup-shaped structures that sit on the thallus surface. In many genera the apothecium bears its own rim of thallus tissue (a thalline margin), while in others the margin is formed solely by the fruit-body wall. A few exceptional taxa develop mazaedia, powdery piles of loose spores, but this is rare in the subclass.

Inside the apothecium the spore sacs (asci) are interwoven with slender sterile filaments called paraphyses. These paraphyses usually branch and swell at their tips, and their outermost layer (the epithecium) often contains brownish pigments or gives a blue reaction when treated with iodine stain (abbreviated "J+"). Each ascus shows a single transparent wall under the light microscope, yet that wall is thickened, especially at the tip, where a cap-like apparatus with intricate channels helps discharge the spores; in a few lineages the wall is thin and soon disappears. The ascospores themselves vary widely in size, shape and internal partitioning. Most members of the subclass are mutualistic lichens paired with simple, spherical green algae (protococcoid photobionts). A minority live on other lichens (lichenicolous) or decompose dead wood in dry, sun-exposed habitats, acting as saprobes rather than forming lichens.

== Classification ==
According to 2024 Outline of Fungi, the Lecanoromycetidae consists of the following orders and families:

- Caliciales Bessey (1907)

- Caliciaceae
- Physciaceae

- Lecanorales Nannf. (1932)

- Biatorellaceae
- Bruceomycetaceae
- Catillariaceae
- Cladoniaceae
- Gypsoplacaceae
- Haematommataceae
- Lecanoraceae
- Malmideaceae
- Megalariaceae
- Pachyascaceae
- Parmeliaceae
- Ectolechiaceae
- Psilolechiaceae
- Psoraceae
- Ramalinaceae
- Ramboldiaceae
- Scoliciosporaceae
- Sphaerophoraceae
- Tephromelataceae

- Lecideales Vain (1934)

- Lecideaceae
- Lopadiaceae

- Leprocaulales Lendemer & B.P.Hodk. (2013)

- Leprocaulaceae

- Peltigerales W.Watson (1929)

- Coccocarpiaceae
- Collemataceae
- Koerberiaceae
- Massalongiaceae
- Pannariaceae
- Peltigeraceae
- Placynthiacee
- Vahliellaceae

- Rhizocarpales Miądl. & Lutzoni ex Miądl. & Lutzoni (2016)

- Rhizocarpaceae
- Sporastatiaceae

- Teloschistales D.Hawksw. & O.E.Erikss (1986)

- Brigantiaeaceae
- Megalosporaceae
- Teloschistaceae

The family Helocarpaceae is of uncertain ordinal placement in the Lecanoromycetidae.
