= Omphalodium =

Scientific classification
- Domain: Eukaryota
- Kingdom: Fungi
- Division: Ascomycota
- Class: Lecanoromycetes
- Order: Lecanorales
- Family: Parmeliaceae
- Genus: Omphalodium; Meyen & Flot.

Type species
- Omphalodium pisacomense Meyen & Flot.

Genus of fungi

Omphalodium is a genus of lichenized fungi within the Parmeliaceae family. The genus contains about four species found in North and South America.
