= Squamella =

Scientific classification
- Kingdom: Fungi
- Division: Ascomycota
- Class: Lecanoromycetes
- Order: Lecanorales
- Family: Cladoniaceae
- Genus: Squamella; S.Hammer (2001)
- Species: S. spumosa

Binomial name
- Squamella spumosa S.Hammer (2001)

Single-species fungal genus

Squamella is a fungal genus in the family Cladoniaceae. The genus is monotypic, containing the single species Squamella spumosa, a squamulose lichen found in Australia. The genus was established in 2001 for a lichen collected in the McIlwraith Range of far-northern Queensland, distinguished by its flattened, leaf-like scales that develop foam-like masses of tiny lobules at their tips. It lacks the stalked structures typical of related genera and grows on bark in seasonal monsoon forests. Its precise evolutionary relationships remain uncertain due to the absence of DNA sequence data.

== Taxonomy ==
Squamella is a genus erected by Samuel Hammer in 2001 to accommodate a distinctive Australian taxon lacking podetia (the stalked structures typical of Cladonia). He described a single species, Squamella spumosa, from far-northern Queensland; the holotype was collected in the McIlwraith Range (Old Leo Creek Mine track) and deposited at the Australian National Herbarium (CANB). The species epithet refers to the "foam-like" mass of minute lobules that accumulate towards the tips of the squamules; Hammer documented these features with scanning electron microscope images and line drawings.

Hammer diagnosed Squamella by several key features. The lichen forms persistent, flattened to upright scales that are deeply divided into lobes and segments. Near their tips, these scales become branch-like and densely covered with small lobes. The scales have distinct upper and lower surfaces (a dorsiventral construction), lack root-like attachments (rhizines), and partner with a Trebouxia-type green alga. Chemically it contains stictic acid, with no podetiate structures reported. He noted thick, longitudinally striated cortical tissue and vein-like thickenings on the upper surface, and the development in older thalli of a distinct lower fungal layer; these features suggested morphological affinity to several southern-hemisphere Cladonia-like segregates (e.g. Cladia, Ramalea, Thysanothecium) and, in the position of occasional fertile structures, to Calathaspis and the Australian endemic Myelorrhiza. As circumscribed in the protologue, Squamella is monospecific, comprising only S. spumosa.

Although the genus has generally been placed in the Cladoniaceae since Hammer proposed this classification in 2001, some sources have noted the absence of fresh material for DNA sequencing, and thus consider its true phylogenetic placement to be uncertain.

== Description ==
The genus is defined by a persistent primary thallus made of small, leaf-like scales (squamules) that are flattened to erect and become increasingly divided into narrow lobes; toward the tips these lobes carry masses of tiny, froth-like lobules. The thallus is clearly dorsiventral (with an upper and a lower surface): the upper side is greenish and matt and can develop a waxy film with pale, vein-like ridges, while the underside is whitish. It lacks rhizines (root-like anchoring threads) and the podetia (stalks) typical of many members of the family are absent. The photobiont is a green alga of the Trebouxia type. Lobules arise at the tips and then along the sides of the flattened branches; they are minute but have a distinct upper and lower side and their own fungal and algal layers.

A thin, pale prothallus (a sparse felt of fungal hyphae) anchors the thallus and may radiate a short distance through the surface layer of the substrate. In young thalli the thallus comprises an upper, tightly packed fungal layer above a looser layer where fungal threads weave among algal cells; in older thalli a three-layered construction is developed, with a dense, exclusively fungal upper cortex, a middle layer packed with algal cells and hyphae, and a lower, purely fungal layer. The upper side often shows longitudinal striations and vein-like thickenings.

Fruiting bodies (apothecia) were not seen on most material; one damaged specimen bore minute apothecia on the lower surface. The few spores examined were brown and divided by several cross-walls (septa), features unusual for the Cladoniaceae, so the author treated these observations cautiously and did not include them in the formal diagnosis pending better material. Chemically, standard spot tests give K+ (yellow) and P+ (orange), UV negative, and the only lichen substance detected was stictic acid.

== Habitat and distribution ==
Squamella is known only from the wet–dry tropics of far-northern Queensland, Australia. The type collection was made in monsoon forest on a moderate slope beside a seasonal stream, at the semi-shaded base of a tree in the McIlwraith Range (about 28 km north-east of Coen) at roughly 430 m elevation.

The lichen grows on organic surfaces rather than rock, especially on bark lacking its outer corky layer. A thin prothallus sits in the surface of the substrate and anchors the thallus. Hammer notes that the species has so far only been found on organic substrates in strongly seasonal, wet–dry tropical habitats in far-northern Queensland, and that both the thalli and their substrate take up water within seconds when moistened.
