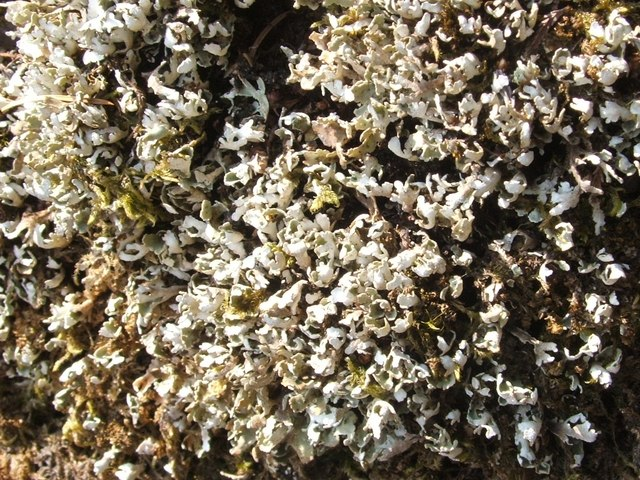

Scientific classification
- Kingdom: Fungi
- Division: Ascomycota
- Class: Lecanoromycetes
- Order: Lecanorales
- Family: Cladoniaceae
- Genus: Cladonia
- Species: C. subcervicornis

Binomial name
- Cladonia subcervicornis (Vain.) Kernst. (1900)

Synonyms
- Cladonia verticillata var. subcervicornis Vain. (1894)

= Cladonia subcervicornis =

Species of lichen

Cladonia subcervicornis is a species of fruticose lichen in the family Cladoniaceae. It is found primarily in oceanic regions of northern and western Europe. First described in 1894, it is distinguished by its cushion-like growth habit and a prominent primary thallus made up of large, erect, greyish-green squamules with darkened undersides. The species typically grows on thin layers of humus in rock crevices along coastal areas, particularly in heath environments, where it can become locally abundant. While it produces both sexual and asexual reproductive structures frequently, genetic studies suggest it has limited dispersal capabilities, with populations even a few kilometres apart showing significant genetic differences. The species has been recorded across Western Europe and the Macaronesian Islands, with rare occurrences in Eastern Europe, though historical reports of its presence in North America have been determined to be incorrect.

== Taxonomy ==
The Finnish lichenologist Edvard August Vainio first described in 1894, initially classifying it as a variety of Cladonia verticillata. In his description, he provided a diagnosis distinguishing it by its primary thallus having medium to large squamules that turn yellow when treated with potassium hydroxide solution (K). He noted that the podetia (upright stalks) bear scyphi (cup-like structures) and are either simple or proliferate with a few tiers, also showing a yellow reaction with K. Vainio cited earlier reports of the lichen from several European locations, including sites in Sweden, Norway, Britain, and Germany, though he indicated that its complete distribution was still imperfectly known at the time. He also discussed specimens from Austria, Greenland, and Tasmania, suggesting a wider global range. The species was previously included within the concept of Cladonia cervicornis, as Vainio indicated that some specimens that Erik Acharius had determined as Cenomyce cervicornis (now known as C. cervicornis) represented this taxon in part. Ernst Kernstock promoted the taxon from varietal to full species status in his 1900 work on European Cladonia species.

Cladonia subcervicornis is in the subclade Firmae of the genus Cladonia. The other species in the clade, C. firma, is also frequent in the Mediterranean region.

== Description ==
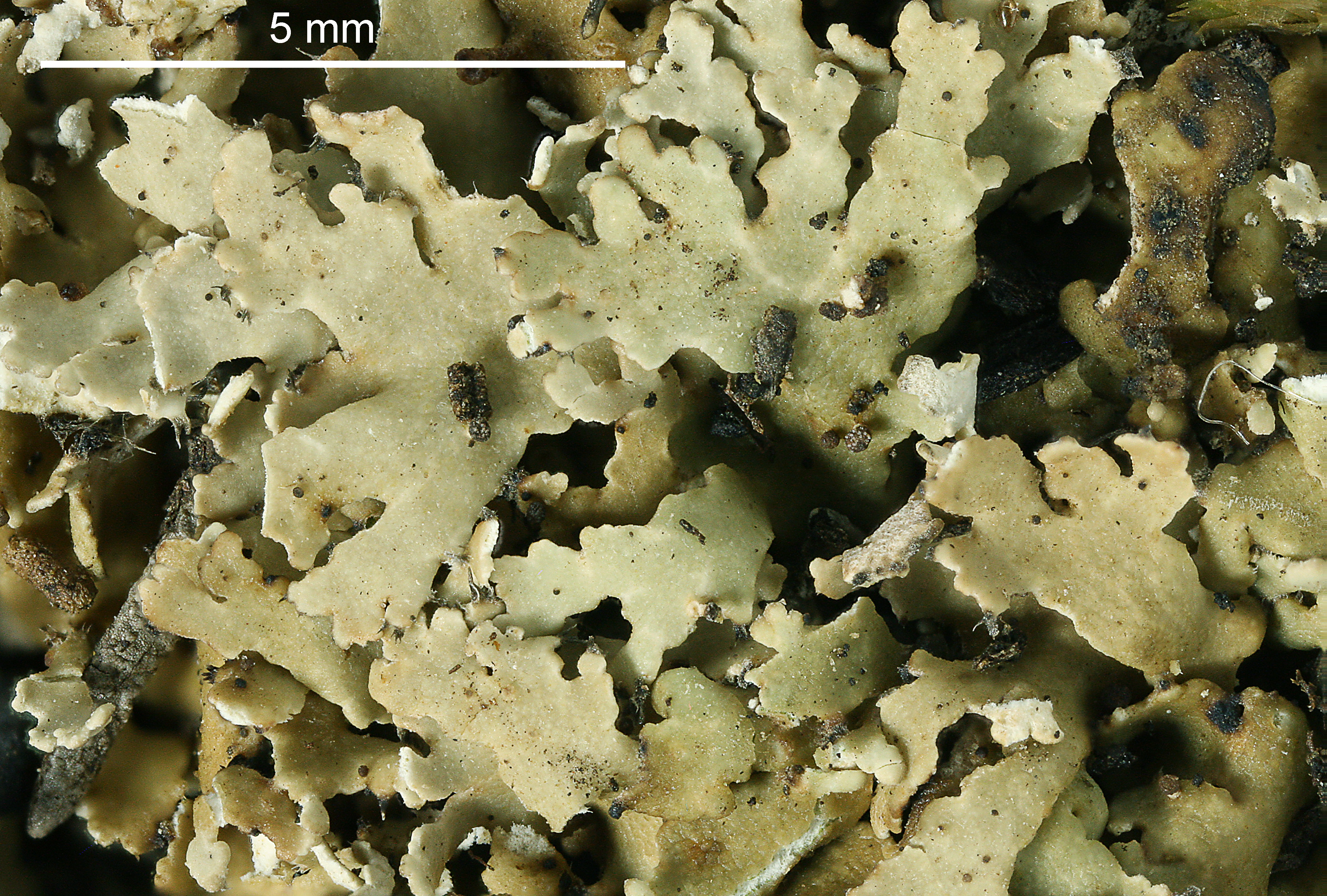
Close-up of the primary thallus showing the characteristic erect, deeply lobed squamules with greyish-green colouration. Specimen from laurel forest in the Canary Islands, at 1,015 m elevation. Scale bar = 5 mm.

Cladonia subcervicornis is characterised by both a primary and secondary thallus (podetia), with the primary thallus being dominant and considerably well-developed. The persistent primary thallus is squamulose, consisting of small, scale-like structures. The squamules, which measure 6–10 mm by 2–5 mm, grow erectly and coalesce into cushion-like formations. Their margins are divided into finger-like lobes and have a greyish-green to bluish colouration on their upper surface, contrasting with a white underside. The base of the squamules is blackened, sometimes extending almost to their middle, and their surface has a very fine, cobweb-like texture.

Podetia, the secondary, upright structures, occur infrequently. When present, they are scyphose (cup-shaped), typically measuring 5–6 mm by 1–2 mm. They have an irregular shape, gradually opening and sometimes proliferating from the margins or centres. They display a greyish-green to olive-green colouration. The surface is corticate (having an outer layer) and varies from smooth to areolate or slightly warty, with a bright appearance and occasional squamules on the scyphal margins.

The species frequently produces both sexual and asexual reproductive structures. Dark brown apothecia (fruiting bodies) commonly occur at the margins of the scyphi, sometimes forming groups. Pycnidia (asexual reproductive structures) are also frequent along the scyphal margins, appearing either sessile or prominent, and produce a hyaline (translucent) slime. Standard chemical spot tests yield characteristic reactions: Pd+ (red), K+ (yellow), KC−, C−, UV−. Its main secondary metabolites are fumarprotocetraric acid complex and atranorin.

=== Similar species ===
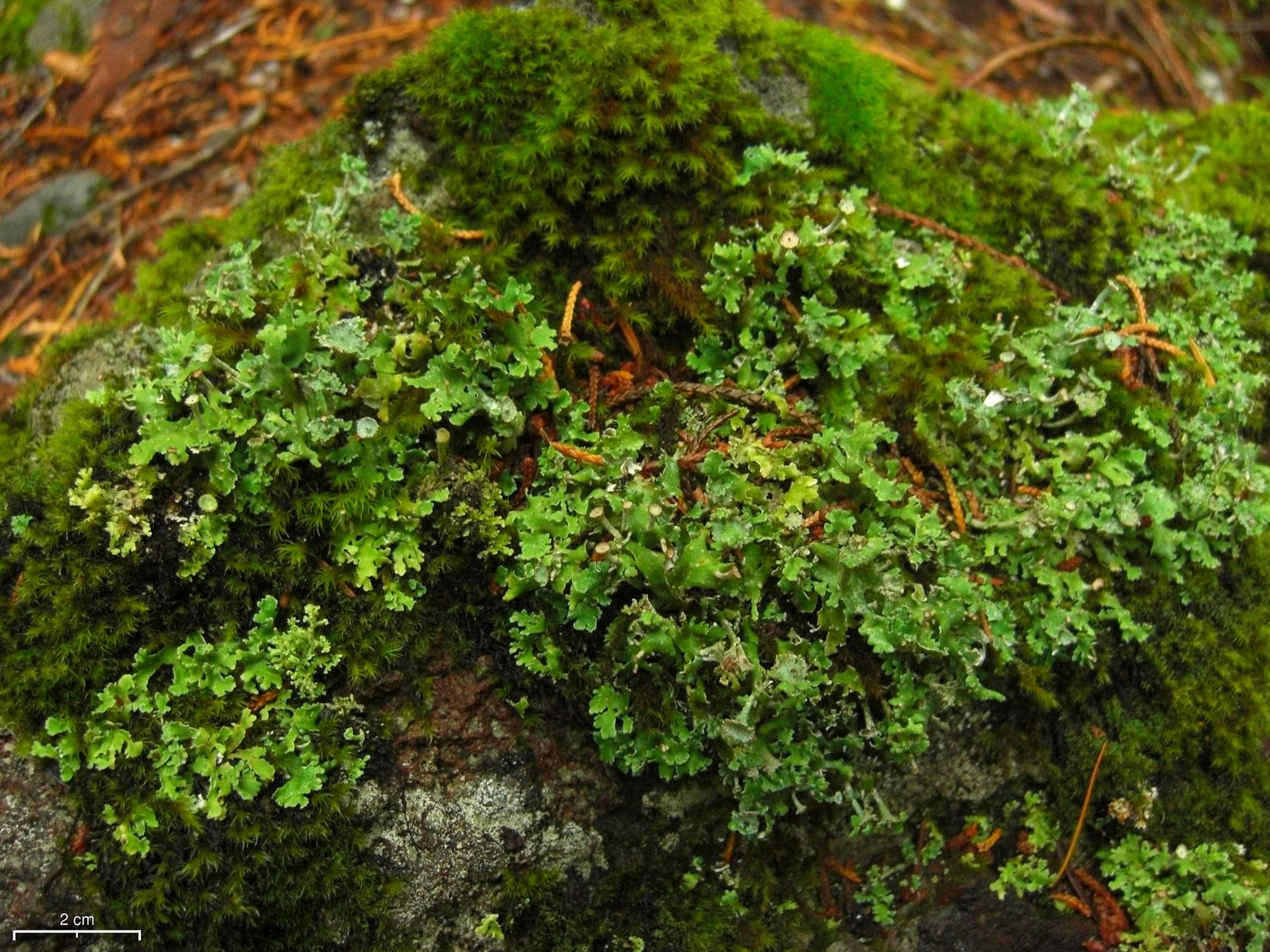
Cladonia macrophyllodes is a potential lookalike

Several other Cladonia species that possess large, squamulose primary thalli may be confused with C. subcervicornis, particularly C. cervicornis, C. macrophylla, C. macrophyllodes, and C. microphylla. However, C. subcervicornis can be distinguished by its distinctively elongated squamules with deeply blackened bases on their undersides. The erect growth habit of its primary thallus squamules is also characteristic. Phylogenetic studies have shown that C. subcervicornis is most closely related to C. firma, with both species containing atranorin and sharing similar distribution patterns.

== Development ==
Development begins with a roughly spheroid fungal meristem that gives rise to the nascent podetium. Its apex flattens and widens to form a concave, ring-shaped (toroid) structure. As growth continues, the meristem ring thins and becomes increasingly annular, eventually deforming into an irregular shape. The thickest portion of the meristem tissue is typically found closest to the apex of the podetium.

Later, as the annular (or cuneate) meristem enlarges and thickens unevenly, the meristem ring splits, and radial divisions begin to appear. This process is accompanied by the appearance of radial divisions at various parts of the structure. The divisions are not simultaneous, and different stages of division completion can be observed within the same meristem structure. After splitting, the resulting segments may continue to develop in various ways, with some segments taking on spheroid shapes with developing concave centres, while others form irregular curvilinear segments.

The developmental pattern in C. subcervicornis is considerably fluid and non-linear, with multiple developmental stages often visible simultaneously on a single structure. While mature podetia may reach 2–3 centimetres in height, all developmental stages can be observed on much smaller structures, including those only a few millimetres tall. Cup-like structures and branch-like proliferations, which characterise mature podetia, can be found on very young specimens. This developmental variability in young specimens makes the interpretation of form in mature podetia particularly challenging.

== Habitat and distribution ==
Cladonia subcervicornis occurs in oceanic parts of northern and western Europe—from the British Isles to northern Norway. It typically inhabits coastal heath environments, forming compact cushions over thin humus layers in rock crevices. The species shows a particular affinity for exposed rock surfaces in these coastal areas, where it can become locally abundant and may even dominate the vegetation of suitable habitats. In Norway, it is frequently found between 400 and 600 metres elevation in areas close to the coast.

The species has a strongly Atlantic distribution pattern, being especially abundant in the colline and montane belts of Western European countries. While historical records suggested a broader range, all North American reports of the species have been determined to be incorrect. While primarily distributed throughout Western Europe and the Macaronesian Islands, it occurs very rarely in Eastern European countries, extending from temperate to boreal zones. In Macaronesia, it is present across all three main archipelagos, occurring at elevations from around 300 to over 900 metres. It has also been recorded from Mediterranean countries including France, Italy, Portugal, Spain and Turkey. A notable inland population exists in Bohemian Switzerland (Czechia), which represents an isolated occurrence far from the species' main Atlantic distribution range. Beyond rock surfaces, it can also be found growing on humus, plant debris, mossy rocks, and occasionally on bare soil, generally preferring acidic substrates.

Although it frequently produces apothecia and abundant spores, effective dispersal is limited. Genetic studies in western Norway reveal marked differentiation between populations only kilometres apart, indicating that long-distance colonisation is uncommon—even in windswept coastal habitats where spore dispersal might be expected to thrive.

Some lichenicolous fungi are known to parasitise Cladonia subcervicornis. Infection by Arthonia digitatae causes the podetia to become bleached and moribund, while heavy infections of Lichenostigma alpinum result in bleaching of the host tissue.

== See also ==
- List of Cladonia species
