= Heteromyces =

Scientific classification
- Kingdom: Fungi
- Division: Ascomycota
- Class: Lecanoromycetes
- Order: Lecanorales
- Family: Cladoniaceae
- Genus: Heteromyces; Müll.Arg. (1889)
- Species: H. rubescens

Binomial name
- Heteromyces rubescens Müll.Arg. (1889)

Single-species fungal genus

Heteromyces is a fungal genus in the family Cladoniaceae. It is a monotypic genus, containing the single species Heteromyces rubescens, a crustose lichen. This little-known rock-dwelling lichen occurs near Rio de Janeiro Brazil. As of 2025, it had not been recorded from any additional localities in Brazil.

== Taxonomy ==
Both the genus and species were described by the Swiss lichenologist Johannes Müller Argoviensis in 1889. The name Heteromyces was also used for a genus circumscribed by Lindsay S. Olive in 1957; this usage is illegitimate because of the prior usage of this name by Müller. Olive's concept of Heteromyces was renamed Oliveonia by Marinus Anton Donk in 1958.

In his Latin protologue, Müller characterised Heteromyces as a foliose lichen with small, lobe-like squamules: the upper surface bears a cortex, while the underside is a cottony medulla lacking both cyphellae and rhizines (root-like holdfasts). He reported spherical green algal cells as the photobiont, apothecia scattered on the upper surface, and colourless ascospores divided by transverse septa. Müller considered the genus close to Knightiella but differing in the nature of its algal partner, and he likened it to a Baeomyces with a foliose thallus and transversely divided spores. The type and only species, Heteromyces rubescens, was based on material collected by Ernst Ule on rock walls near Rio de Janeiro, Brazil.

Jahns suggested that it should be included in the family Cladoniaceae in 1970. Doug Verdon and John Elix noted its developmental similarities to Calathaspis. Teuvo Ahti pointed out that the filiform (threadlike) spores and the ascus structure resemble the genus Physcidia in the Biatoraceae.
