= Cladonia wainioi =

Conservation status
- Secure (NatureServe)

Scientific classification
- Kingdom: Fungi
- Division: Ascomycota
- Class: Lecanoromycetes
- Order: Lecanorales
- Family: Cladoniaceae
- Genus: Cladonia
- Species: C. wainioi

Binomial name
- Cladonia wainioi Savicz (1914)

Species of lichen

Cladonia wainioi or the Wainio's cup lichen is a species of cup lichen found in boreal and arctic regions of the Russian Far East and northern North America.

== Taxonomy ==
Cladonia wainioi was described as a new species by Russian lichenologist Vsevolod Savich (1885–1972) in 1914. The first scientific specimens were collected in the Kamchatka Peninsula. The specific epithet honours Finnish lichenologist Edvard August Wainio. In early molecular phylogenetic analysis of genus Cladonia, Cladonia wainioi was positioned as basal to the rest of the Cladoniae. Stenroos and colleagues proposed placing it in subdivision I of Cladonia, a deviation from the placement in Cladonia section Ascyphiferae proposed by Teuvo Ahti a couple of years before. They suggested that C. wainioi is "rather distinct in its cladinioid branching and its production of merochlorophaeic acid".

== Description ==
Cladonia wainioi has greenish to brownish mineral-grey podetia that are covered with small scales (squamulate). The axils (the inner junction of a branchlet with a branch or with another branchlet) are open. Pycnidia are common, while apothecia are rare. Cladonia wainioi is highly branched, and similar in form to the common species Cladonia multiformis and Cladonia furcata. The latter two species, however, have a lichen spot test of PD+ red, while C. wainioi is PD−.

== Habitat and distribution ==
Cladonia wainioi grows in boreal bogs and rocks in arctic regions of eastern Asia and northern North America. Its Asian range extends south to Japan, while the North American distribution extends from Alaska to Newfoundland south to mountains in New England.

== See also ==
- List of Cladonia species
