= Sphaerophoropsis =

Scientific classification
- Domain: Eukaryota
- Kingdom: Fungi
- Division: Ascomycota
- Class: Lecanoromycetes
- Order: Lecanorales
- Family: Cladoniaceae
- Genus: Sphaerophoropsis; Vain. (1890)

Type species
- Sphaerophoropsis stereocauloides Vain. (1890)

Lichen genus in the family Cladoniaceae

Sphaerophoropsis is a genus of lichenized fungi in the family Cladoniaceae. A monotypic genus, Sphaerophoropsis contains the single species Sphaerophoropsis stereocauloides. Both the genus and species were described as new to science in 1890 by Finnish lichenologist Edvard August Vainio, from collections made in Brazil.
