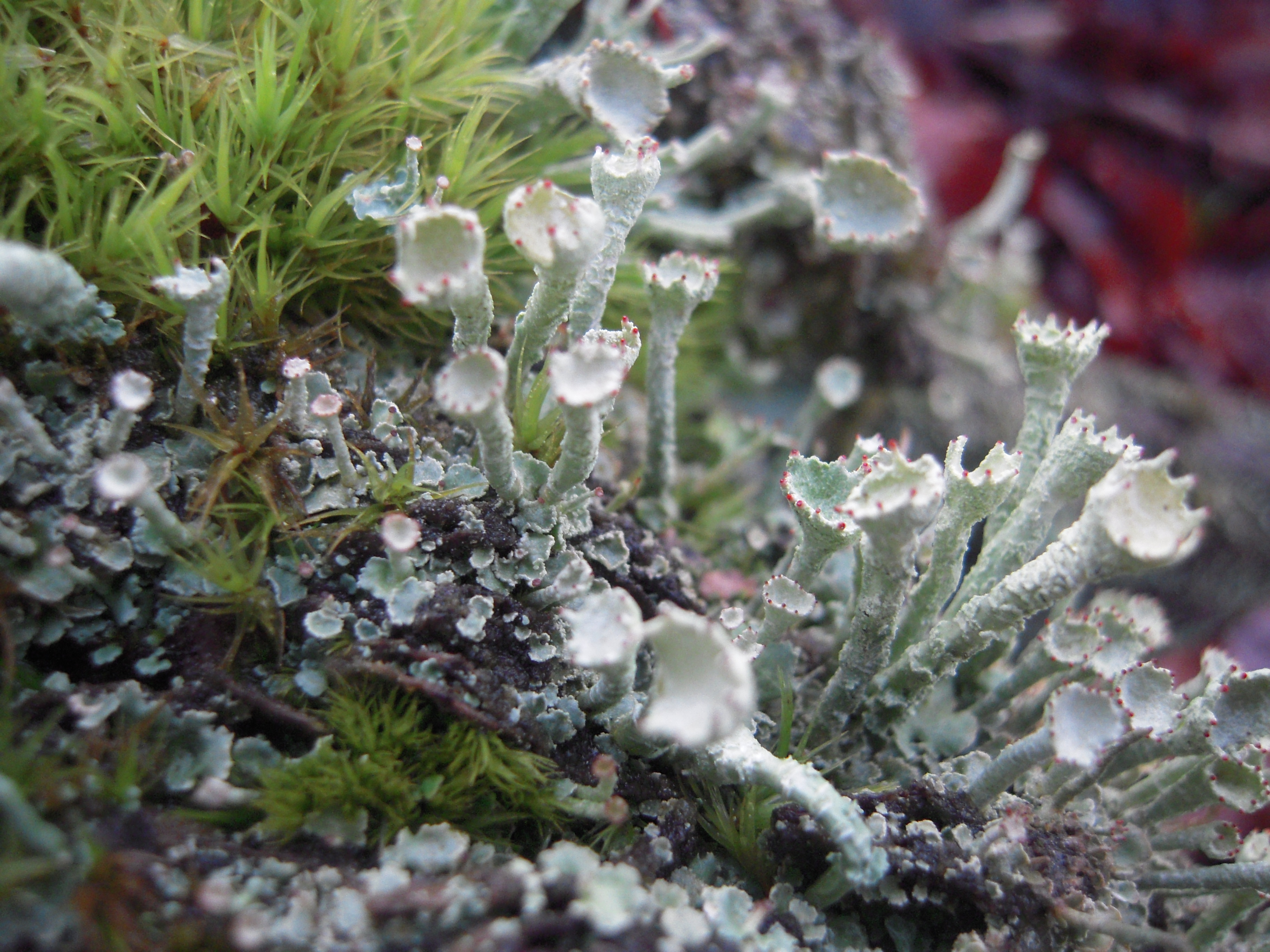

Conservation status
- Secure (NatureServe)

Scientific classification
- Kingdom: Fungi
- Division: Ascomycota
- Class: Lecanoromycetes
- Order: Lecanorales
- Family: Cladoniaceae
- Genus: Cladonia
- Species: C. digitata

Binomial name
- Cladonia digitata (L.) Hoffm. (1796)

= Cladonia digitata =

Species of lichen

Cladonia digitata, commonly known as the finger cup lichen, is a cup lichen species in the family Cladoniaceae.

== Description ==
Cladonia digitata is a fruticose lichen found mainly in northern Eurasia and North America. It grows mainly on rotten wood, but also grows in rich soils or living plants.

The primary thallus is composed of large or medium-sized squamules, 2–15 mm. long, involute or somewhat flat and sometimes sorediate at the margin or below. The podetia arise from the surface of the primary thallus, around 10-15mm. long. The lower part is .5–4 mm. in diameter and cylindrical or often incrassate below the cups. Its proliferation is either simple or repeated; The upper part and especially the cups are sorediate and the cavity corticate. The lower part or sometimes the entire podetium is covered with a continuous cortex, without squamules. The cups are medium-sized, 10–15 mm. in diameter and 2–5 mm. high. The margin is commonly somewhat incurved, sub-entire, dentate radiate or proliferate. The ascoma are apothecial, apothecioid or hymenial. The apothecium, reddish in color, is usually medium-sized, or rarely small, .5-5mm. in diameter. They are located at the apices of the branches or rarely on the margin of the cups, are either simple or clustered and either convex or immarginate. The paraphyses are simple or rarely branched, and are somewhat enlarged toward the apex. The asci are cylindrico-clavate The asci are lecanoralean, with a thickened tholus. There are normally 8 ascospores.

== Biochemistry ==
Among the secondary metabolites are bellidiflorin, thamnolic acid (which has shown use as an antimicrobial agent), decarboxythamnolic acid and the red pigment rhodocladonic acid.

== See also ==
- List of lichens named by Carl Linnaeus

== Links to photos ==
- Stephen Sharnoff's Lichen Photos - Cladonia digitata
- The Lichen Herbarium, Natural History Museum, University of Oslo, Norway (Photo Gallery) - Cladonia digitata
- Flechtenbilder (Lichen Images) by Ulrich Kirschbaum -Cladonia digitata
- British Lichens (photo by M. Sutcliffe) Cladonia digitata
