= Muhria =

Scientific classification
- Kingdom: Fungi
- Division: Ascomycota
- Class: Lecanoromycetes
- Order: Lecanorales
- Family: Cladoniaceae
- Genus: Muhria; P.M.Jørg. (1987)
- Species: M. urceolata

Binomial name
- Muhria urceolata P.M.Jørg. (1987)

Synonyms
- Stereocaulon urceolatum (P.M.Jørg.) Högnabba (2006)

Genus of lichen-forming fungi

Muhria is a fungal genus containing a single crustose lichen species, Muhria urceolata. Its family placement is disputed. Broad fungal databases currently accept it in Cladoniaceae, whereas some Nordic and specialist lichen sources place it in Stereocaulon as Stereocaulon urceolatum, usually in the family Stereocaulaceae. The lichen forms a small crust on rock and thin soil, typically among patches of free-living cyanobacteria, and is distinctive for its urn-shaped apothecia that split open by star-shaped slits.

== Taxonomy ==
The genus was circumscribed in 1987 by Norwegian lichenologist Per Magnus Jørgensen, who also described its type species, M. urceolata. He established the new genus because the combination of external appearance and, in particular, the mode of apothecial development could not be accommodated satisfactorily in any existing genus. The generic name honours Lars-Erik Muhr of Karlskoga, whose collections made the study possible, while the species epithet urceolata ('urn-shaped') refers to the form of the developing fruiting bodies.

In discussing relationships, the authors noted strong superficial similarities to Stereocaulon (Stereocaulaceae), to the extent that inclusion in that genus was considered. However, they rejected this option because Muhria has a different, hemiangiocarpic mode of apothecial development. In this mode, the fruiting bodies form beneath a roof of fungal tissue that later splits open. They placed the taxon within the Lecanorales and also compared it with trapelioid lichens, concluding that the developmental pathway of the apothecia, rather than gross form, warrants recognition as a separate genus. Scanning electron micrographs show the star-shaped slit clearly, demonstrating this developmental pattern.

An early (2002) SSU rDNA phylogeny of cladoniiform lichens recognized Stereocaulaceae as a single evolutionary group (monophyletic) and sister to Cladoniaceae, but Muhria was not sampled owing to lack of suitable material. The authors therefore kept it only provisionally in Stereocaulaceae, explicitly listing it as "not analysed", and noted that its family placement remained unresolved pending sequence data. A broader molecular study of Stereocaulon (ITS rDNA + β-tubulin) finally sampled Muhria urceolata and found it nested among the crustose Stereocaulon lineages; on that basis the author formally sank the genus and made the new combination Stereocaulon urceolatum. Högnabba also argued that apothecial development cannot serve as a generic boundary here, because hemiangiocarpic development (partially enclosed) occurs within several Stereocaulon species, so Muhria is best treated inside Stereocaulon.

== Description ==
The thallus is crustose, forming a cracked mosaic of small, angular areoles that are pale grey-green and contain the green-algal partner just beneath the surface. Between these areoles are dark tufts of free-living cyanobacteria, mainly Stigonema, over and among which the fungal filaments may grow. This mixture of green areoles and blackish, hair-like cyanobacterial cushions gives the lichen a distinctive speckled appearance. The species has also been cited as one of the few lichens in which green algae and cyanobacteria occur together in a common photobiont layer.

Fruiting bodies (apothecia) arise beneath a continuous outer layer and then break open through that roof; early stages are urn-like, and mature cups open by several radiating slits so the disc looks star-cut from above. Internally the apothecia show a typical lecanorine structure with eight-spored asci and a colourless, septate spore type; asexual propagules are also present—pycnidia produce conidia—and powdery soredia commonly form around young apothecia. No lichen substances were detected in the material examined by Jørgensen and Jahns, although later British material has been reported to contain atranorin and lobaric acid.

== Habitat and distribution ==
Muhria urceolata grows on open, nutrient-poor, often sun-exposed mineral surfaces where cyanobacterial films or cushions are already established, places such as weathered rock and thin gritty soils with intermittent moisture. The lichenised areoles sit within and around these cyanobacterial patches, and early apothecial stages are frequently seen developing among the cyanobacteria; soredia can be trapped there as well.

The species is known from scattered localities in Sweden and Norway, likely to be overlooked because of its small size and unusual growth form. They suggested that similar habitats with cyanobacterial crusts elsewhere might also harbour the lichen, so the apparent Scandinavian restriction could reflect under-collecting rather than a genuinely narrow range. The species was originally described from scattered localities in Sweden and Norway, and later specialist treatments also reported it from Scotland. It grows on open rock or thin soil among cyanobacterial mats; British material has been described from moist siliceous rock faces and other sheltered humid habitats.
