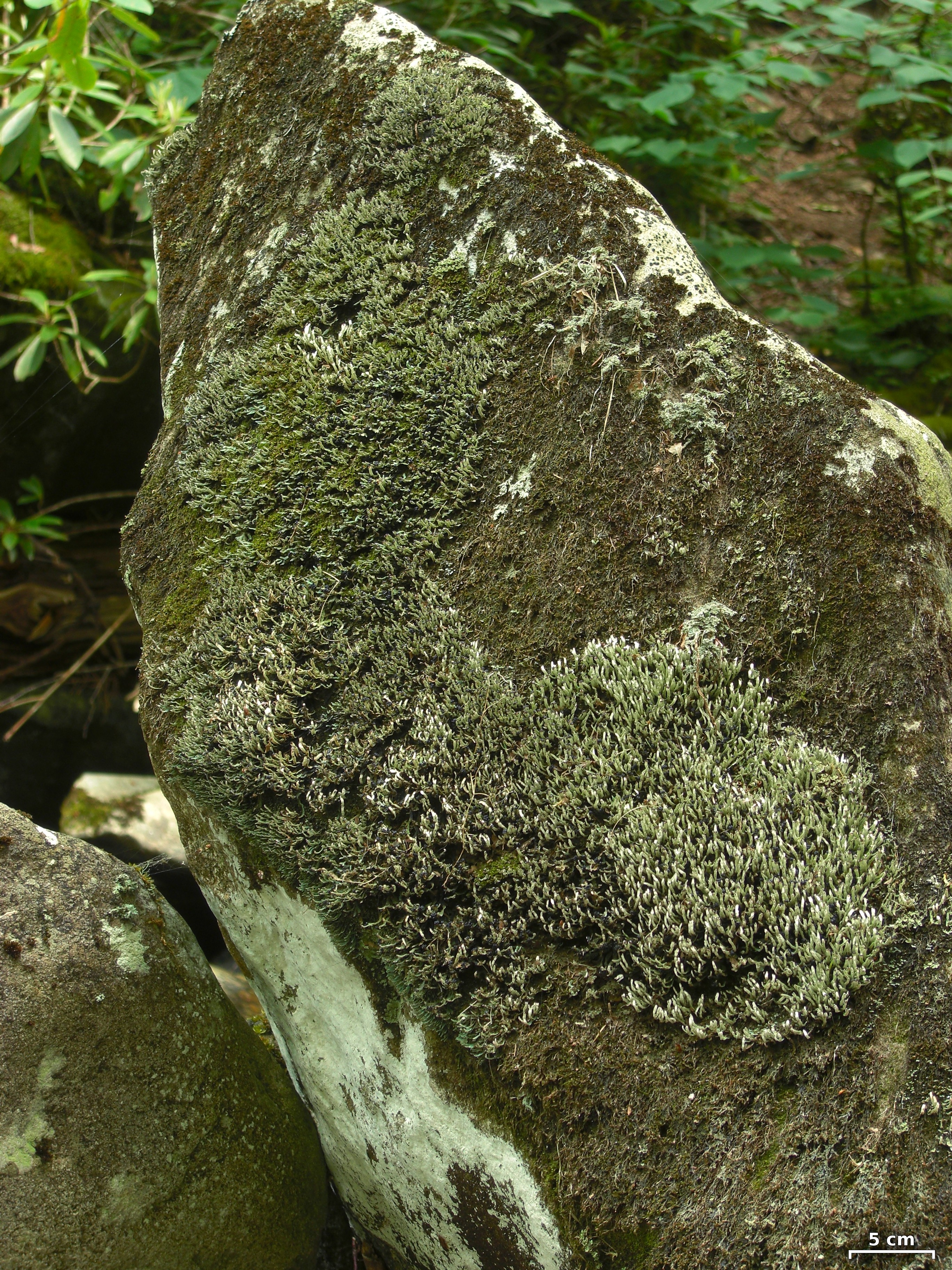
- Cetradonia linearis

Conservation status
- Vulnerable (IUCN 3.1)

- Vulnerable (NatureServe)

Scientific classification
- Kingdom: Fungi
- Division: Ascomycota
- Class: Lecanoromycetes
- Order: Lecanorales
- Family: Cladoniaceae
- Genus: Cetradonia; J.C.Wei & Ahti (2002)
- Species: C. linearis

Binomial name
- Cetradonia linearis (A.Evans) J.C.Wei & Ahti (2002)

Synonyms
- Cladonia linearis A.Evans (1947); Gymnoderma lineare (A.Evans) Yoshim. & Sharp (1968)

= Cetradonia =

Single-species fungal genus

Cetradonia is a lichen genus in the family Cladoniaceae. A monotypic genus, Cetradonia contains the single species Cetradonia linearis (formerly known as Cladonia linearis and as Gymnoderma lineare). The genus was circumscribed in 2002 by Jiang-Chun Wei and Teuvo Ahti. The genus was once placed in the family Cetradoniaceae (created in 2002) until that family was subsumed into the Cladoniaceae in 2006.

Cetradonia linearis, commonly known as the rock gnome lichen, is a squamulose lichen found in the higher elevations of the southern Appalachian Mountains. Populations are only known to exist in Georgia, North Carolina, South Carolina and Tennessee. The lichen occurs only in frequent fog, or in deep river gorges. Because of its specialized habitat requirements and heavy collection for scientific purposes, the lichen has been listed as an endangered species since January 18, 1995. It is only one of two lichens on the endangered species list, the other being the Florida perforate cladonia.

== Description ==
Genus Cetradonia features a thallus that is enduring and well-formed, typically aggregating into clumps. These thalli are characterized by their almost cylindrical base stalks that evolve into linear, flattened, and strap-like lobes. These lobes are somewhat upright, ranging from unbranched to minimally branched, and have a cartilaginous texture. They measure between 5 and 25 mm (0.2 and 1.0 in) in length and 0.5 to 1 mm in width, often connecting at the base through horizontal structures known as rhizomorphs. The upper surface of the thallus is densely covered by a cortex, with colors from greyish green to pale yellowish brown or olive-green, enclosing a cartilaginous core. In contrast, the lower surface has a thinner cortex, lacks veins, though it may show transverse wrinkling towards the lower end and has furrows and pits near the tips, transitioning in color from white or cream at the tip to black towards the base.

Podetia, which are small stalked structures, emerge predominantly from the upper section of the thallus's lower surface, often near the tip, and have a dirty white hue. These structures can range from 0.3 to 2 mm in height, are covered by a cortex, solid in form, and may or may not contain algae. The reproductive structures, known as ascomata, host clusters of hymenial discs that can expand up to 2 mm across, with individual discs varying from 0.1 to 1 mm in diameter. These discs are flat to spherical in shape and dark brown to black in color, occasionally stacking atop one another in a manner similar to Cladia aggregata. The asci, or spore-bearing structures, are slender, with stalks that can extend up to 2 mm; conidia (asexual spores) have not been observed to occur in this species.

In terms of chemical composition, Cetradonia contains atranorin and lichesterinic acids.

== Habitat and distribution ==
Cetradonia linearis is endemic to the southern Appalachian Mountains, where it grows chiefly on bare, shaded rock faces in cool, humid habitats. Most occurrences are on vertical rock faces above 1,500 m (4,900 ft), although the species also occurs at lower elevations in deep river gorges. As of 2025, 67 populations were known across Georgia, North Carolina, South Carolina, Tennessee, and Virginia, with the center of the range in North Carolina.

Most known populations occur on protected lands. The total recognized in the 2026 review is slightly lower than the 68 populations reported in the previous review, but the report attributed that difference mainly to revised population delineation rather than to biological loss. Even so, long-term monitoring remains limited, making it difficult to assess population trends confidently across the species' range, and the recovery criteria set out in the 1997 recovery plan had still not been met.

== Conservation ==
A 2026 U.S. Fish and Wildlife Service five-year review concluded that the rock gnome lichen should remain listed as an endangered species. The report found that some earlier threats, such as acid rain, have lessened, but that the species remains vulnerable to warming temperatures, reduced humidity, drying of its microhabitats, and canopy loss caused by adelgid damage to eastern hemlock and Fraser fir. Local disturbance from trampling and rock climbing also remains a concern, and sedimentation in streams may alter occupied rock surfaces in ways that make them less suitable for the lichen.

The review also summarized work suggesting that populations differ in both the lichen's own genetic makeup and the microbial communities associated with it. Because of that geographic structuring, the loss of a single population could also mean the loss of distinctive local genetic diversity and site-specific microbial partners.

== See also ==
- List of fungi by conservation status
