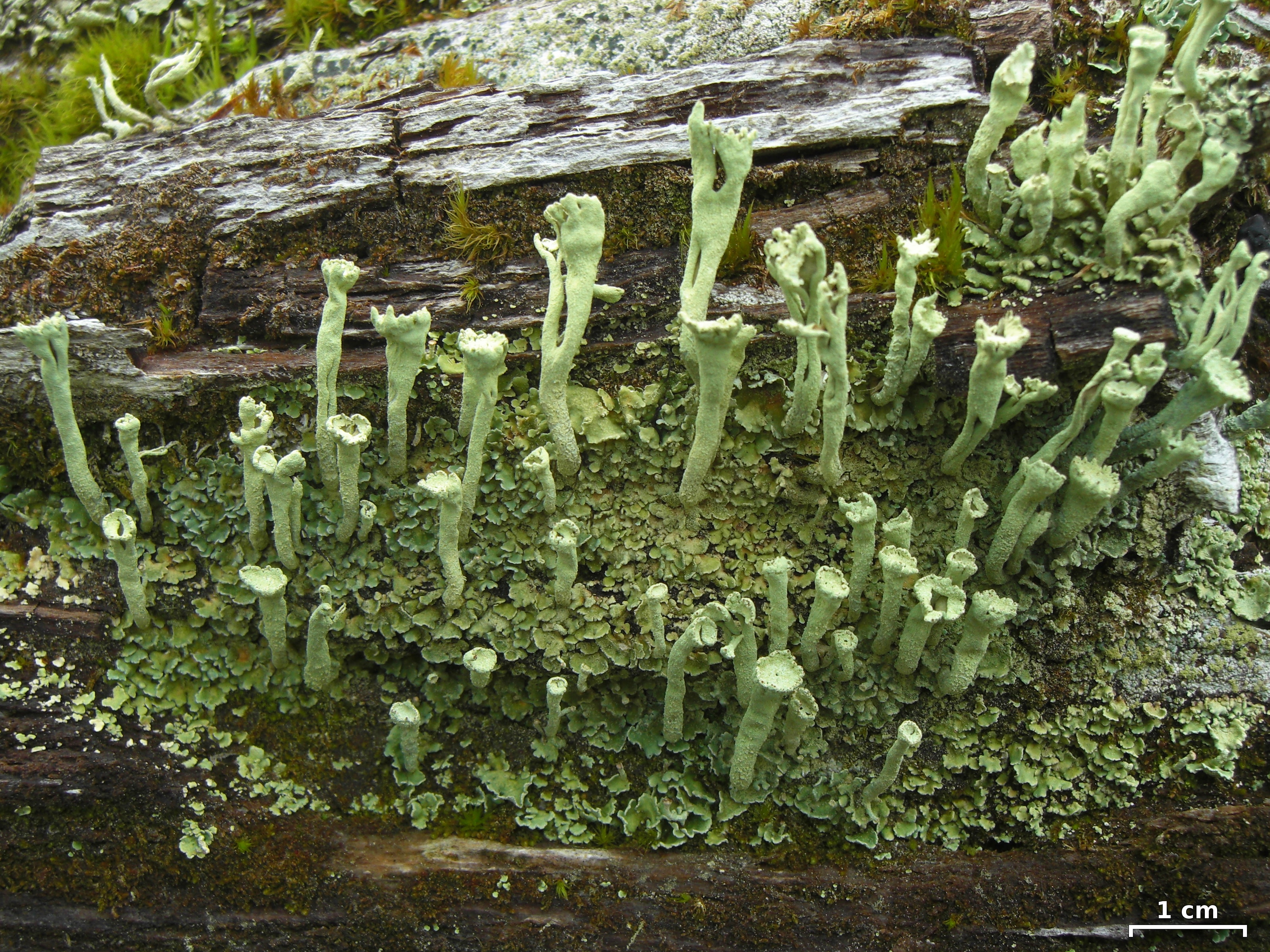

Conservation status
- Secure (NatureServe)

Scientific classification
- Kingdom: Fungi
- Division: Ascomycota
- Class: Lecanoromycetes
- Order: Lecanorales
- Family: Cladoniaceae
- Genus: Cladonia
- Species: C. sulphurina

Binomial name
- Cladonia sulphurina (Michx.) Fr. (1831)

Synonyms
- Cladonia gonochea; Scyphophorus sulphurinus

= Cladonia sulphurina =

Species of lichenised fungus in the family Cladoniaceae

Cladonia sulphurina is a species of cup lichen belonging to the family Cladoniaceae.

As of July 2021, its conservation status has not been estimated by the IUCN. In Iceland, it is classified as an endangered species (EN).

== See also ==
- List of Cladonia species
