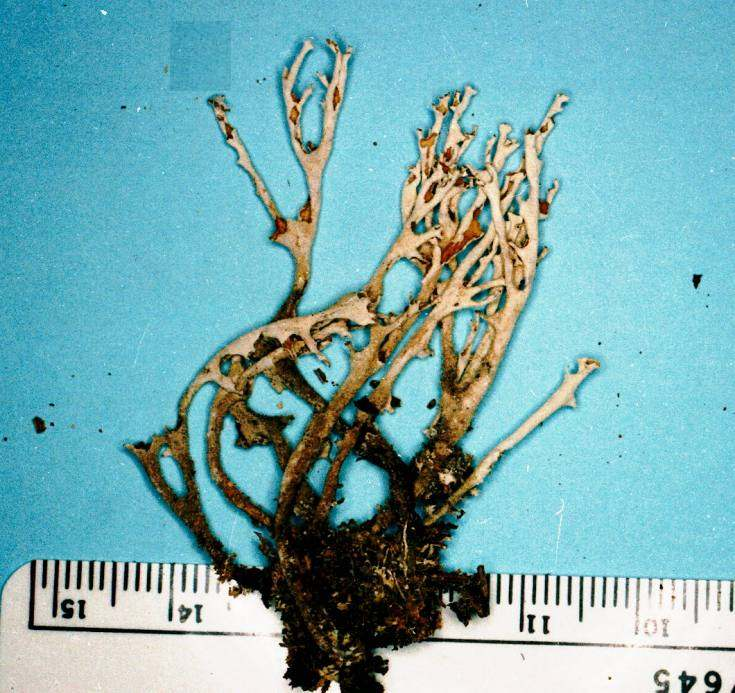
- Specimen collected in Fundy National Park, New Brunswick, Canada

Conservation status
- Secure (NatureServe)

Scientific classification
- Kingdom: Fungi
- Division: Ascomycota
- Class: Lecanoromycetes
- Order: Lecanorales
- Family: Cladoniaceae
- Genus: Cladonia
- Species: C. cenotea

Binomial name
- Cladonia cenotea (Ach.) Schaer.

= Cladonia cenotea =

Species of cup lichen

Cladonia cenotea or the powdered cup lichen is a species of cup lichen in the family Cladoniaceae. It was first described by Erik Acharius in 1823.

It grows on the north side of rotting wood or stumps in shaded areas.
