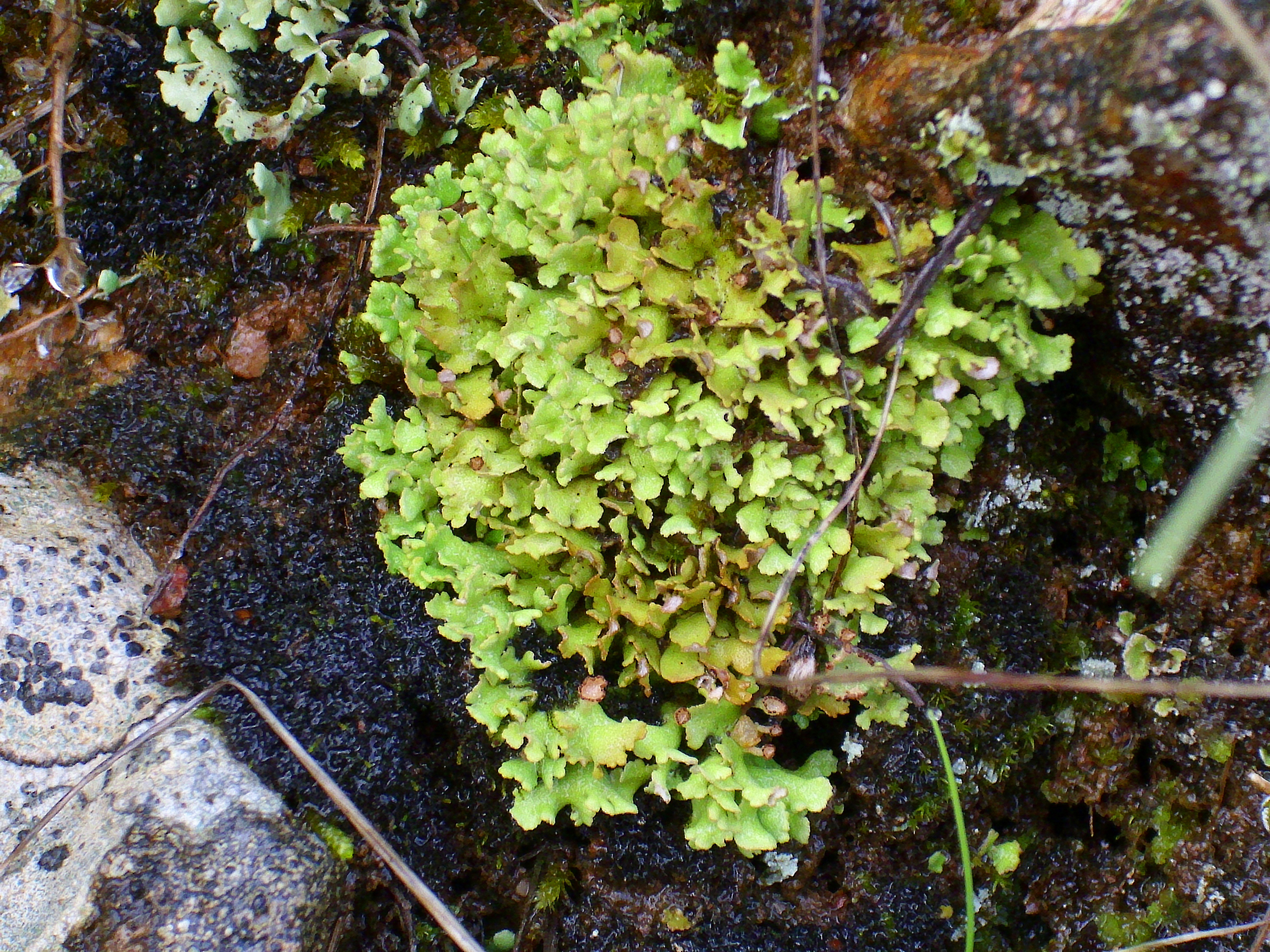

Scientific classification
- Domain: Eukaryota
- Kingdom: Fungi
- Division: Ascomycota
- Class: Lecanoromycetes
- Order: Lecanorales
- Family: Cladoniaceae
- Genus: Cladonia
- Species: C. foliacea

Binomial name
- Cladonia foliacea (Huds.) Willd. (1787)

Synonyms
- Lichen foliaceus Huds. (1762)

= Cladonia foliacea =

Species of lichen

Cladonia foliacea is a species of lichen belonging to the family Cladoniaceae.

It has a cosmopolitan distribution.
