= Cladonia minisaxicola =

Scientific classification
- Domain: Eukaryota
- Kingdom: Fungi
- Division: Ascomycota
- Class: Lecanoromycetes
- Order: Lecanorales
- Family: Cladoniaceae
- Genus: Cladonia
- Species: C. minisaxicola

Binomial name
- Cladonia minisaxicola Aptroot & Cáceres (2018)

Species of lichen

Cladonia minisaxicola is a rare species of saxicolous (rock-dwelling) lichen in the family Cladoniaceae. Found in Bahia, Brazil, it was formally described as a new species in 2018 by lichenologists André Aptroot and Marcela Eugenia da Silva Cáceres. The type specimen was collected by the authors from the Serrano along Rio de Lençóis at an altitude between 450 and 500 m (1,480 and 1,640 ft); here the lichen was found growing on siliceous sandstone rock in a transitional forest. Cladonia minisaxicola is only known to occur at the type locality (part of the Chapada Diamantina mountains), and is only known from the type specimen. The lichen has a crustose thallus that consists of lobe-like nodes that collectively form an irregular crust measuring up to 4 cm (1.6 in) in diameter. Although it differs from all other species of Cladonia in the form of its non-squamulose primary thallus, its position in that genus has been confirmed with molecular phylogenetic analysis. The specific epithet minisaxicola acknowledges its small size and saxicolous growth.

== See also ==
- List of Cladonia species
