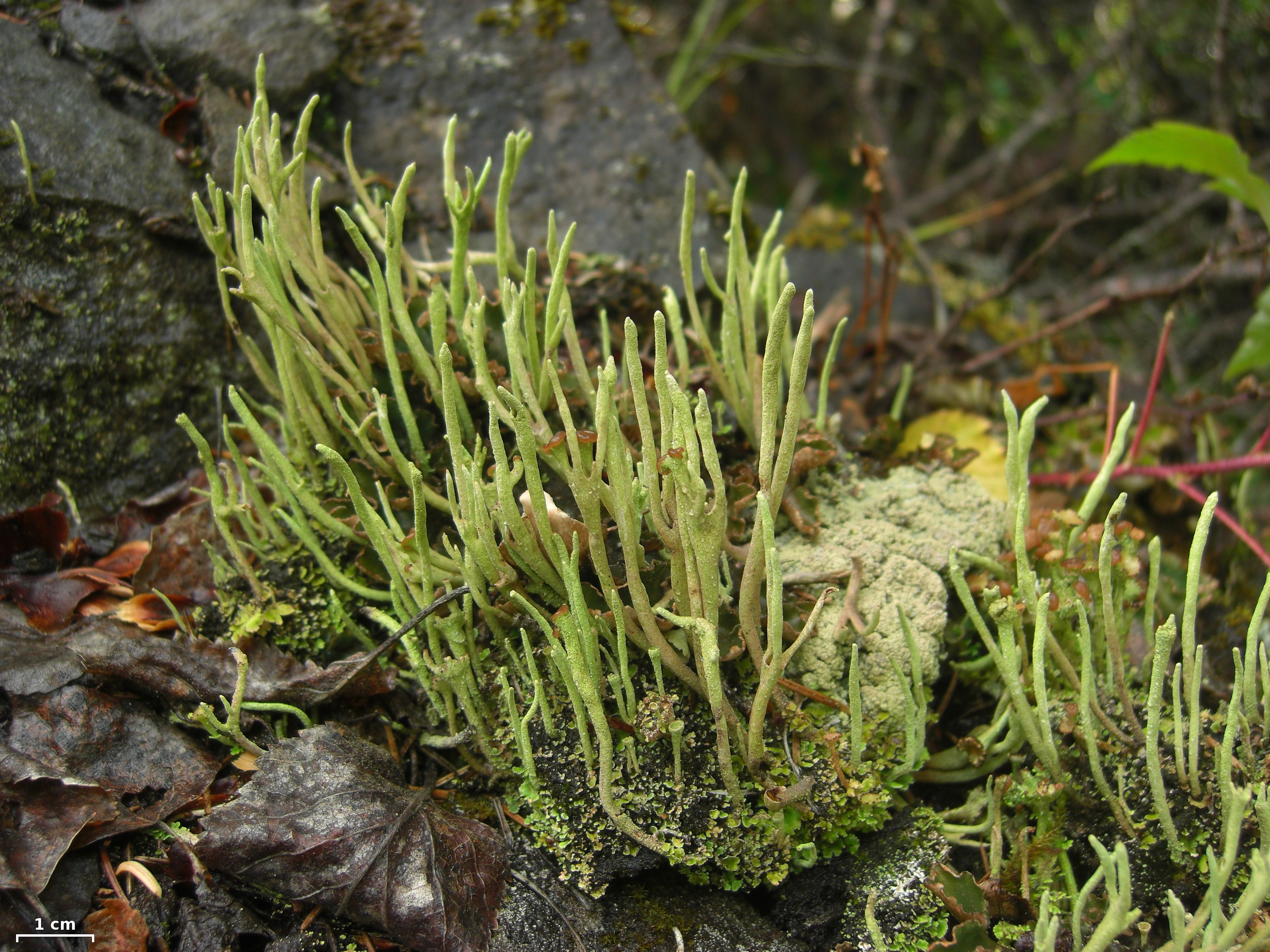
- Cladonia subulata is the type species of the type genus of the family Cladoniaceae

Scientific classification
- Kingdom: Fungi
- Division: Ascomycota
- Class: Lecanoromycetes
- Order: Lecanorales
- Family: Cladoniaceae; Zenker (1827)

Type genus
- Cladonia P.Browne (1756)

Synonyms
- Cetradoniaceae J.C.Wei & Ahti (2002); Squamarinaceae Hafellner (1984)

= Cladoniaceae =

Family of lichen-forming fungi

The Cladoniaceae are a family of lichen-forming fungi in the order Lecanorales, comprising about 560 species distributed amongst 18 genera. This family is one of the largest among lichen-forming fungi and is globally distributed, from Arctic tundra to tropical rainforests, favouring humid environments while being intolerant of arid conditions. Molecular phylogenetics has substantially advanced the understanding of their complex taxonomic history, revealing intricate evolutionary relationships and leading to a refined classification. Notable members include reindeer moss and cup lichens of the genus Cladonia, which consist of about 500 species and forms a major part of the diet for large mammals in taiga and tundra ecosystems.

A distinctive feature of many Cladoniaceae species is their dimorphic thallus: a scaly or crust-like primary form and a fruticose (shrub-like) secondary form known as a podetium or pseudopodetium. These lichens typically grow on soil, decaying wood, or tree trunks, with a few species found on rocks. They form symbiotic associations with green algae, usually from the genus Asterochloris. The family is known for its diverse secondary metabolites—over 70 have been identified—which play roles in species identification and ecological functions such as protection against UV radiation and herbivore deterrence. Genomic studies have uncovered considerable variation in mitochondrial DNA among Cladoniaceae species, and this variation has helped clarify relationships within the family.

Some Cladoniaceae species have economic value, particularly in decorative uses such as floral arrangements and model-making due to their unique structures. Six species are included in the International Union for Conservation of Nature's Red List of Threatened Species, facing threats from habitat loss, climate change, and human activities. Conservation efforts are ongoing to protect these vulnerable species.

== Systematics ==
=== Historical taxonomy ===
Before the term 'lichen' was widely adopted, one of the earliest classification systems for these organisms was developed by the German botanist Johann Jacob Dillenius. In his 1741 system, Cladonia species were placed within the genus Coralloides. In his Species Plantarum, Carl Linnaeus formally described several species that are now classified within the Cladoniaceae. Although he initially placed them in the eponymously named genus Lichen, a dozen of these species are recognised as belonging to the genus Cladonia. Among these was Cladonia pyxidata, a representative of the "pixie cup" or "trumpet" lichens—so named for their distinctive shape, as well as some well-known and widespread Cladonia species: C. coccifera, C. cornuta, C. deformis, C. digitata, C. fimbriata, C. gracilis, C. portentosa, C. rangiferina, C. stellaris, C. subulata, and C. uncialis. These 12 species represent about 14% of the 80 Lichen species Linnaeus described in his seminal 1753 work.

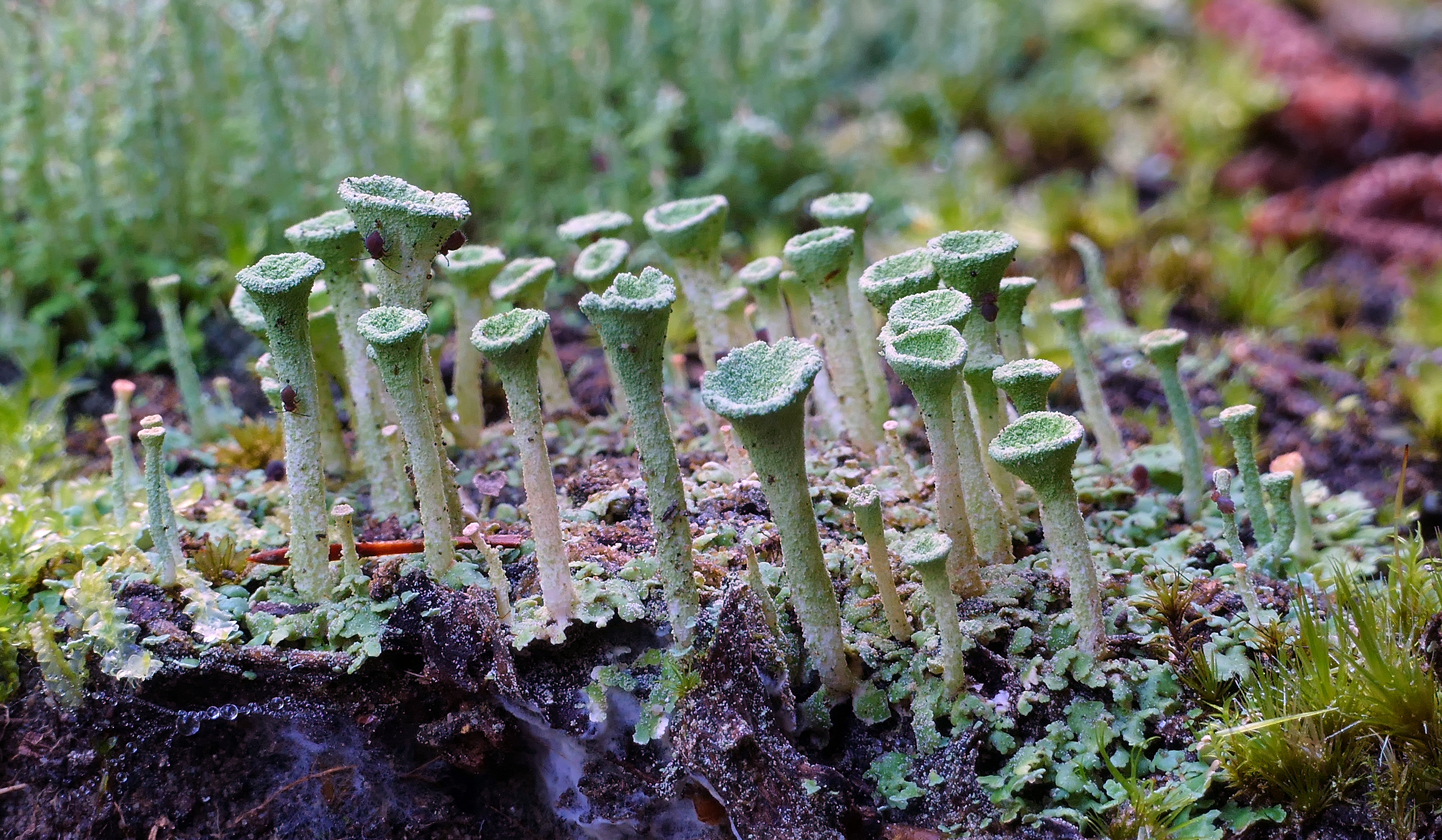
The pixie cup, Cladonia pyxidata, was one of the first lichens to be scientifically described.

The German naturalist Jonathan Carl Zenker formally introduced the Cladoniaceae to science in 1827, with his work appearing in a publication edited by Karl Goebel. Zenker's initial concept of the family included genera such as Baeomyces, Icmadophila, and Stereocaulon, which have since been reclassified into separate families due to advances in taxonomic understanding. William Nylander included 53 Cladonia species worldwide in his 1860 work Synopsis lichenum. When Edvard August Vainio published his three-volume monograph on the Cladoniaceae (Monographia Cladoniarum universalis, 1887, 1894, and 1897), he included 134 species and subspecies. In his circumscription of the family, the genera Pycnothelia, Cladia, and Cladina were included in the genus Cladonia. In recent history, Teuvo Ahti's extensive research, including comprehensive monographs and revisions, has considerably advanced the understanding of Cladoniaceae taxonomy and biogeography.

Cladoniaceae is now one of the largest families of lichen-forming fungi, with about 560 species distributed amongst 18 genera. The type genus is Cladonia, circumscribed by the Irish physician and botanist Patrick Browne in 1756. He included eight species in his new genus. Of their occurrence, he wrote: "All these species are found in great abundance in the mountains of Liguanea: they grow mostly on the ground, among other sorts of moss, but a few ... species chiefly are found upon the decaying trunks of trees."

=== Etymology and naming ===
As is standard practice in botanical nomenclature, the name Cladoniaceae is based on the name of the type genus, Cladonia, with the ending -aceae indicating the rank of family. The genus name comprises the Greek word: κλάδος (klādos), meaning "branch", "bud", or "shoot"; and the Latin -ia, a suffix commonly used in Latin to form nouns, particularly in taxonomy to denote genera.

It is well known that reindeer feed on lichens, which has led to the widespread but misleading name "reindeer moss". This common name, along with "reindeer lichen" and "caribou lichen", is typically applied to the ground-dwelling, mat-forming species that were previously classified in the genus Cladina. Cladonia species with cup-shaped structures borne at the tips of vertical stalks (podetia) are often known as "pixie cups". Examples include the "boreal pixie cup" (C. borealis), the "finger pixie cup" (C. digitata), and the "red-fruited pixie cup" (C. pleurota) Additional names alluding to these characteristic structures include the "powdered funnel lichen" (C. cenotea), and the "trumpet lichen" (C. fimbriata). Some names reference the reddish hue of their fruiting structures, such as "British soldiers" (C. cristatella), the "jester lichen" (C. leporina), and the "lipstick powderhorn" (C. macilenta).

=== Phylogenetics ===
- Cladoniaceae
  - - - - - - - - Cladonia foliacea
                - Cladonia firma
                - Cladonia subcervicornis
              - Cladonia gracilis
            - - Cladonia sulphurina
              - Cladonia bellidiflora
            - Cladonia cervicornis
          - Cladonia wainioi
        - - - Pycnothalia papillaria
            - Carassea connexa
          - - Gymnoderma coccocarpum
            - Cetradonia linearis
      - Metus conglomeratus
    - Thysanothecium scutellatum
  - - - - Cladia gorgonea
        - Cladia retipora
      - Cladia coralliazon
    - Cladia aggregata
    - Cladia sullivanii
  - - Pilophorus acicularis
    - Pilophorus cereolus
  - Cladia muelleri
  - Pilophorus strumaticus
  - Cladia beaugleholei
  - Notocladonia cochleata

Cladogram depicting phylogenetic relationships among selected Cladoniaceae taxa, based on Stenroos and colleagues' 2019 analysis.

Molecular phylogenetics studies have greatly advanced the scientific understanding of relationships within the Cladoniaceae, particularly in the large and diverse genus Cladonia. Early studies in the early 2000s began to reveal the complexity of relationships within the family, challenging traditional morphology-based classifications. More recent comprehensive analyses have identified 13 major clades within Cladonia, providing a framework for understanding the genus's evolution and diversity. These clades, while generally well-supported by molecular data, often lack clear morphological synapomorphies (shared physical characteristics inherited from a common ancestor), highlighting the challenges in Cladonia taxonomy. Some clades, such as clade Erythrocarpae (characterised by red apothecia) and clade Ochroleucae (with pale ochraceous apothecia), do share distinctive features. However, most clades encompass a wide range of morphological and chemical variation.

Within these clades, several species complexes have been identified, such as the Cladonia gracilis group and the Cladonia humilis group. These complexes often include morphologically similar species that are difficult to distinguish based on traditional taxonomic characters. Molecular studies have revealed that many of these complexes contain cryptic diversity, with genetically distinct lineages that are not easily recognisable morphologically.

Focused molecular studies have further refined the understanding of specific groups within Cladoniaceae. For instance, detailed analyses of the Cladonia furcata complex have revealed high levels of homoplasy (the occurrence of similar traits due to convergent evolution rather than shared ancestry) in the morphological characters traditionally used for species delimitation. Similarly, studies on the Cladonia cariosa group and the Cladonia pyxidata group have uncovered previously unrecognised diversity and highlighted the need for integrative approaches combining molecular, morphological, and chemical data in species delimitation. These phylogenetic studies have also shed light on biogeographic patterns within Cladoniaceae. For example, some clades show distinct geographic distributions, such as a group of predominantly African species within clade Perviae, while others have more cosmopolitan distributions. Morphologically distinct genera like Carassea, Pycnothelia, and Metus form a sister clade to Cladonia. These genera share some morphological and chemical traits, such as dimorphic thalli and the production of atranorin. However, their geographic distributions vary, with Carassea being endemic to Brazil, while Pycnothelia has a bipolar distribution (i.e., found in the high latitudes of both hemispheres) and Metus is found primarily in Australasia.

A 2026 multilocus study provided the first time-calibrated phylogeny focused on the Cladoniaceae. It suggested that the family originated in the Late Cretaceous (roughly 70–80 million years ago), while Cladonia itself began diversifying in the Early Eocene (around 50 million years ago). Although the inferred ages varied somewhat between datasets and some deeper nodes remained uncertain, most of the major clades within Cladonia were estimated to have diversified during the Miocene (roughly 5–23 million years ago), linking the family's radiation to major Cenozoic climatic changes.

=== Genomics ===
Genomic studies have revealed extensive variation in the size and structure of mitochondrial DNA in Cladoniaceae, uncovering considerable diversity in genome size and structure. Within the genus Cladonia, mitochondrial genomes span from approximately 45,000 to 66,000 base pairs, consistently containing respiratory genes and ribosomal RNA regions across all examined species. Crustose lichens tend to have smaller mitochondrial genomes compared to their fruticose and foliose counterparts. The genomes often harbour homing endonuclease genes, which may influence genomic evolution. Notably, substantial intraspecific variation has been observed, particularly in widespread species such as C. rangiferina and C. submitis. Unlike some other symbiotic organisms, Cladoniaceae do not exhibit mitochondrial genome reduction, suggesting complex evolutionary dynamics.

=== Synonymy ===
Several phylogenetic studies have shown that Cladoniaceae is a member of the order Lecanorales, and is closely related to the family Stereocaulaceae. The family Cetradoniaceae, which was created in 2002 to contain the endangered species Cetradonia linearis, was folded into the Cladoniaceae in 2006.

In 2018, Ekaphan Kraichak and colleagues used a technique called temporal banding to reorganise the Lecanoromycetes, proposing a revised system of classification based on correlating taxonomic rank with geological (evolutionary) age. They synonymised the families Squamarinaceae and Stereocaulaceae with the Cladoniaceae, resulting in a large increase in the number of genera and species. The Squamarinaceae had already been included in the Cladoniaceae by previous authors. Although this reorganisation has been used in some later publications, the folding of the Stereocaulaceae into the Cladoniaceae was not accepted in a recent analysis. Robert Lücking highlighted that merging the two families under the name Cladoniaceae is not permissible without a formal conservation proposal because Stereocaulaceae, established in 1826, predates Cladoniaceae, which was established in 1827. According to the rules of botanical nomenclature, the earliest validly published name has priority and must be used when two families are combined unless an exception is granted. This means that if the families were merged without a conservation proposal, the combined family would have to be named Stereocaulaceae due to its earlier establishment. In a 2021 treatment of the British and Irish Cladoniaceae, the authors also keep these families separate, noting "both families are monophyletic and easily distinguishable on both morphological and molecular terms".

== Description ==
Cladonia coccifera has a two-part (dimorphic) growth structure

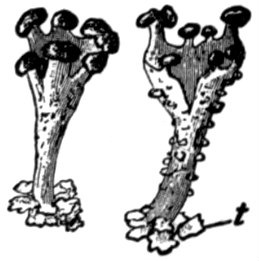
The t points to the leaf-like scales (squamules) of the ground-hugging primary thallus.

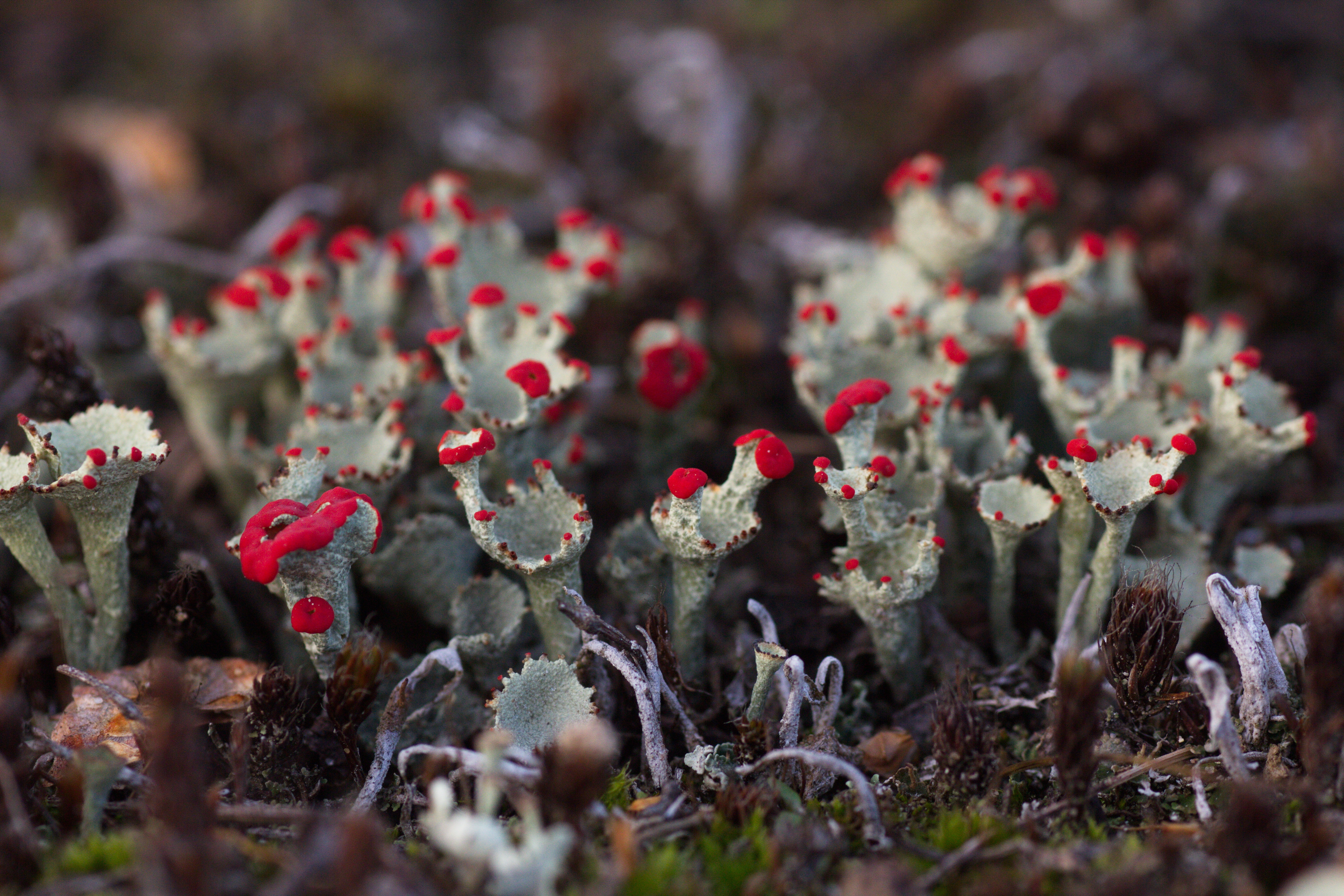
The upright secondary thallus, with stalks (podetia) topped by cup-shaped structures (apothecia). The red slime on the cup rims contains asexual reproductive spores (conidia).

The thallus (body) of Cladoniaceae lichens often have a unique structure known as cladoniiform growth, where two distinct forms develop simultaneously within the same organism. The primary thallus, which can be short-lived (evanescent) or long-lasting, grows close to the surface and may appear crusty, leafy, or scaly. From this base, a secondary thallus typically grows upright, bearing the reproductive structures (ascomata). This secondary growth can range from a few millimetres to over 25 centimetres (10 inches) in height. Due to this dual structure, the overall appearance of these lichens can be either fruticose (bushy) or foliose (leafy). However, some species in this family do not develop either the primary thallus or the upright structures, showing variations within the group. As for vegetative propagules, isidia occur rarely in this family, whereas soredia are common.

The ascomata are in the form of an apothecium, and are biatorine, meaning they are of the lecideine type – light in colour and soft in consistency. They often have a reduced margin. Their colour is typically dark brown (sometimes pale brown), red, ochraceous, or black. The hamathecium (referring to all hyphae between the asci in the hymenium) consists of sparsely branched paraphyses, and is amyloid, indicating that stains blue to blue-black with iodine-based reagents. The asci (spore-bearing cells) are somewhat fissitunicate, meaning they have two layers that separate during ascus dehiscence. The ascus structure consists of an apical dome and a tube (both of which are amyloid), which is cylindrical to clavate (club-shaped). Ascospores number eight per ascus, and they are usually non-septate (lacking internal partitions), ellipsoid to more or less spherical in shape, hyaline (translucent), and non-amyloid. Except for a few genera that produce septate ascospores (Calathaspis, Pycnothelia and Pilophorus), the hymenium does not generally have characters that are useful in taxonomy. The conidiomata (asexual fruiting bodies) are in the form of pycnidia; the conidia (asexual spores) are non-septate, usually filiform (thread-like), and hyaline.

=== Chemistry ===
In the Cladoniaceae, over 70 different secondary metabolites (lichen products), primarily polyphenols, have been identified. These substances crucial roles in species identification and have ecological functions such as protection against UV radiation and deterrence of herbivores. To observe the fluorescence of certain depsides and depsidones, ultraviolet light is directly applied to the specimens. Traditional colour spot tests with reagents like KOH can be ineffective at low concentrations. Consequently, thin-layer chromatography, a laboratory technique used to separate chemical compounds, is essential for detecting and identifying lichen substances that are present in low concentrations. Chemotaxonomy is an important aspect in the identification of Gray's pixie cup (Cladonia grayi): when lit by a UV light, it produces a light blue fluorescence.

=== Photobionts ===
The symbiotic algal partner (photobiont) of most Cladoniaceae taxa are unicellular green algae, usually in the genus Asterochloris, but occasionally in the genus Chlorella; both of these genera are in the class Trebouxiophyceae. Eleven species of Asterochloris have found to be associated with genus Cladonia; the algal genus – one of the most common lichen symbionts – occurs in the thalli of more than 20 lichen genera. The most common photobionts in this genus that associate with Cladonia are A. glomerata, A. italiana, and A. mediterranea, with some lineages showing dominance in one or several climatic regions. In contrast, Myrmecia was shown to be the main photobiont for the Mediterranean species Cladonia subturgida. The algal genus Trebouxia, a common lichen photobiont, has not been recorded associating with the Cladoniaceae. Some Pilophorus species form tripartite associations, involving the fungus, green algae, and cyanobacteria within gall-like structures called cephalodia. The cyanobacterial genera Nostoc and Stigonema are involved in these tripartite associations. In a study of several Cladonia lichens collected from Southern Finland, the associated microbial community, which was found to be consistent amongst the different species, consisted largely of Alphaproteobacteria and Acidobacteriota.

== Development ==
The development of several Cladoniaceae genera have been studied in detail, although the interpretation of results has sometimes been controversial. For example, two 1970 studies by Hans Jahns explored the development of fruiting bodies in Cladonia, important for understanding the taxonomy and phylogeny within the Cladoniaceae. This work revealed two distinct ontogenetic types based on the formation of generative tissue and its role in developing the characteristic podetium of Cladonia species. This generative tissue, originating in the thallus horizontalis and growing vertically, is crucial for forming the podetium. The study identified variability within species, showing that different species can have more than one ontogenetic type, challenging previous assumptions about the uniformity of development patterns within the genus. This demonstrated variability had implications for the taxonomy and phylogenetic relationships within Cladoniaceae, suggesting a complex evolution of reproductive structures that did not strictly align with previously conceived taxonomic groupings.

Cladoniaceae species begin development with the formation of a prothallus – a fungal layer upon which an alga-containing thallus will develop. It comprises the hyphae from the germination of an ascospore. After the protothallus contacts the alga, lichenisation begins with the development of small squamules (scale-like thallus segments) that make up the primary thallus, which is squamulose (scaly) or crustose (crustose-like). The secondary thallus consists of vertical structures that are shrubby and hollow, although they can be solid in rare cases. If these structures are made of generative tissue, they are called podetia; when they are made of vegetative tissue, they are called pseudopodetia. The morphology of these structures determines to a large part the taxonomy of the Cladoniaceae, which can range from simple to complex branching patterns. Cladonia minisaxicola, found in the mountains of Bahia (Brazil) is the only species in that large genus that is completely crustose and does not develop podetia.

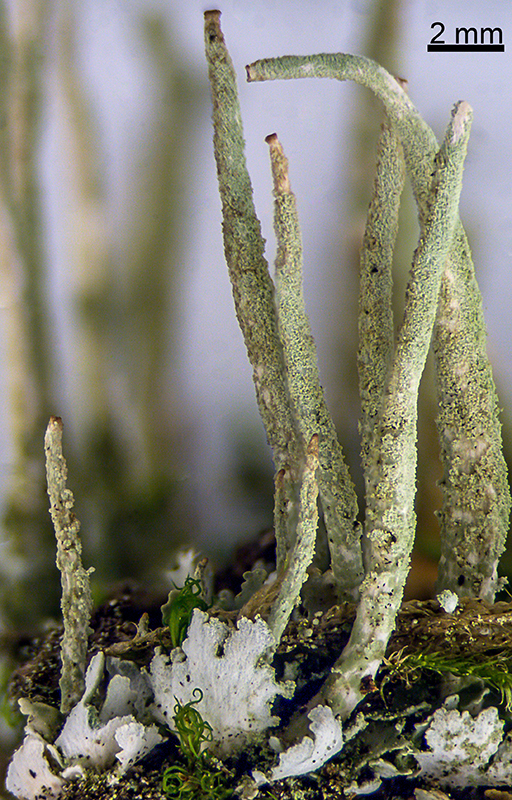
"common powderhorn"

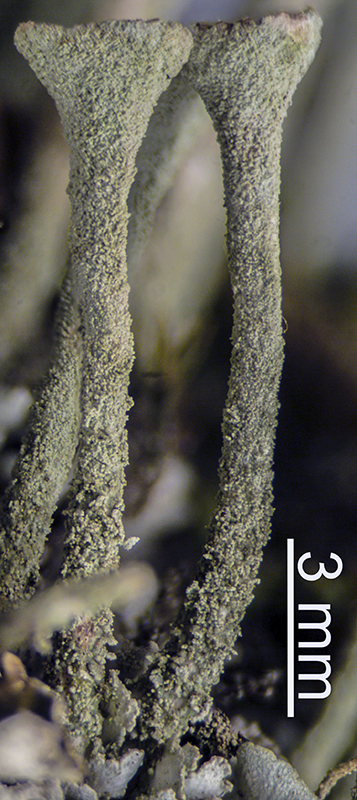
"trumpet lichen"

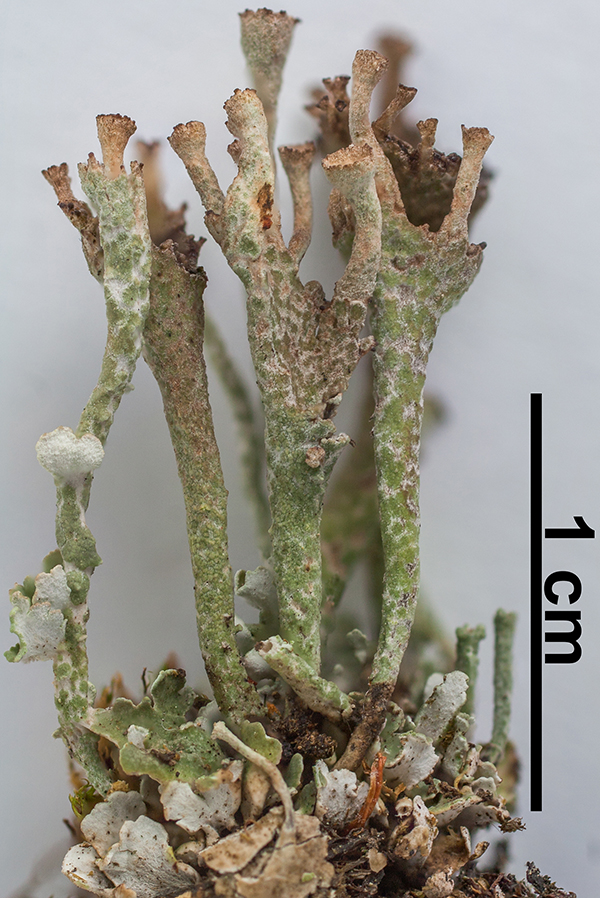
"ladder lichen"

Cladonia coniocraea (left) has subulate podetia, C. fimbriata (middle) features cup-shaped scyphi, commonly called "pixie cups", and C. cervicornis (right) has a more complex branching pattern.

The tips of the podetia have a wide range of morphology in the Cladoniaceae. They can be straight, tapering from a wide base to a point (called subulate), or flaring on cup-shaped scyphi. The scyphi are sometimes closed, or have a central perforation, forming structures called funnels. The podetia are slow-growing, with an annual growth rate generally ranging from 1 to 15 mm.

Branching in the Cladoniaceae occurs on the podetium, driven by the growth patterns of fungal meristem tissue at its tip. There are two main branching patterns: in one, branches emerge later from a large meristem that changes shape, while in the other, smaller meristems split early but keep their shape. These growth patterns help scientists understand the evolutionary relationships within Cladoniaceae. A shift from isotropous growth (uniform in all directions) to anisotropous growth (different in various directions) allows for more flexibility in development. This transition, from symmetrical to more irregular growth, may signal evolutionary adaptations. Despite these changes, the branching processes remain highly consistent even among species in the family that are not closely related.

== Genera ==
After more than a century of discovery and research, including recent advances in understanding revealed by molecular phylogenetics studies, the Cladoniaceae encompass 18 genera and more than 500 species. In terms of species diversity, the Cladoniaceae stood as the tenth-largest lichen-forming fungal family by 2017. This is a list of the genera contained within the Cladoniaceae, based on the Catalogue of Life; this includes taxa formerly classified in the Squamarinaceae, but does not include the Stereocaulaceae. Following the genus name is the taxonomic authority, year of publication, and the number of species:

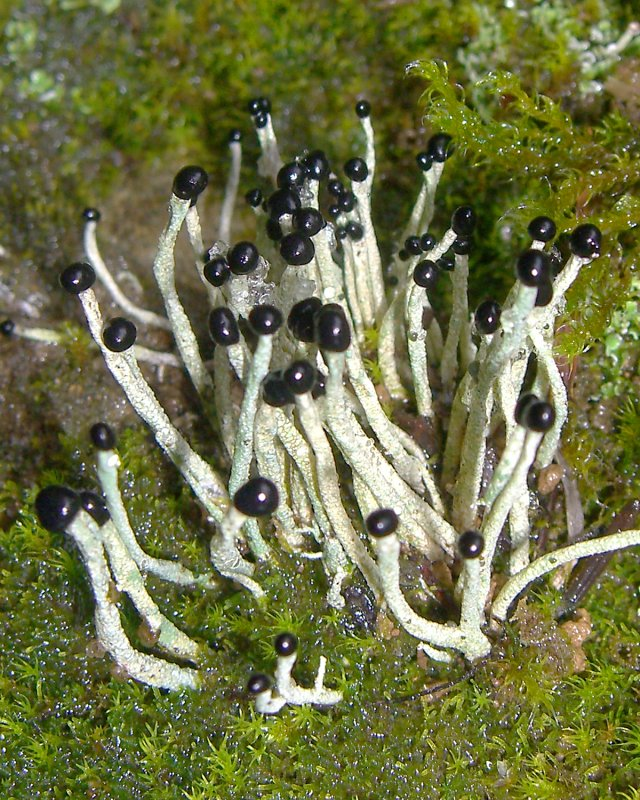
Pilophorus acicularis

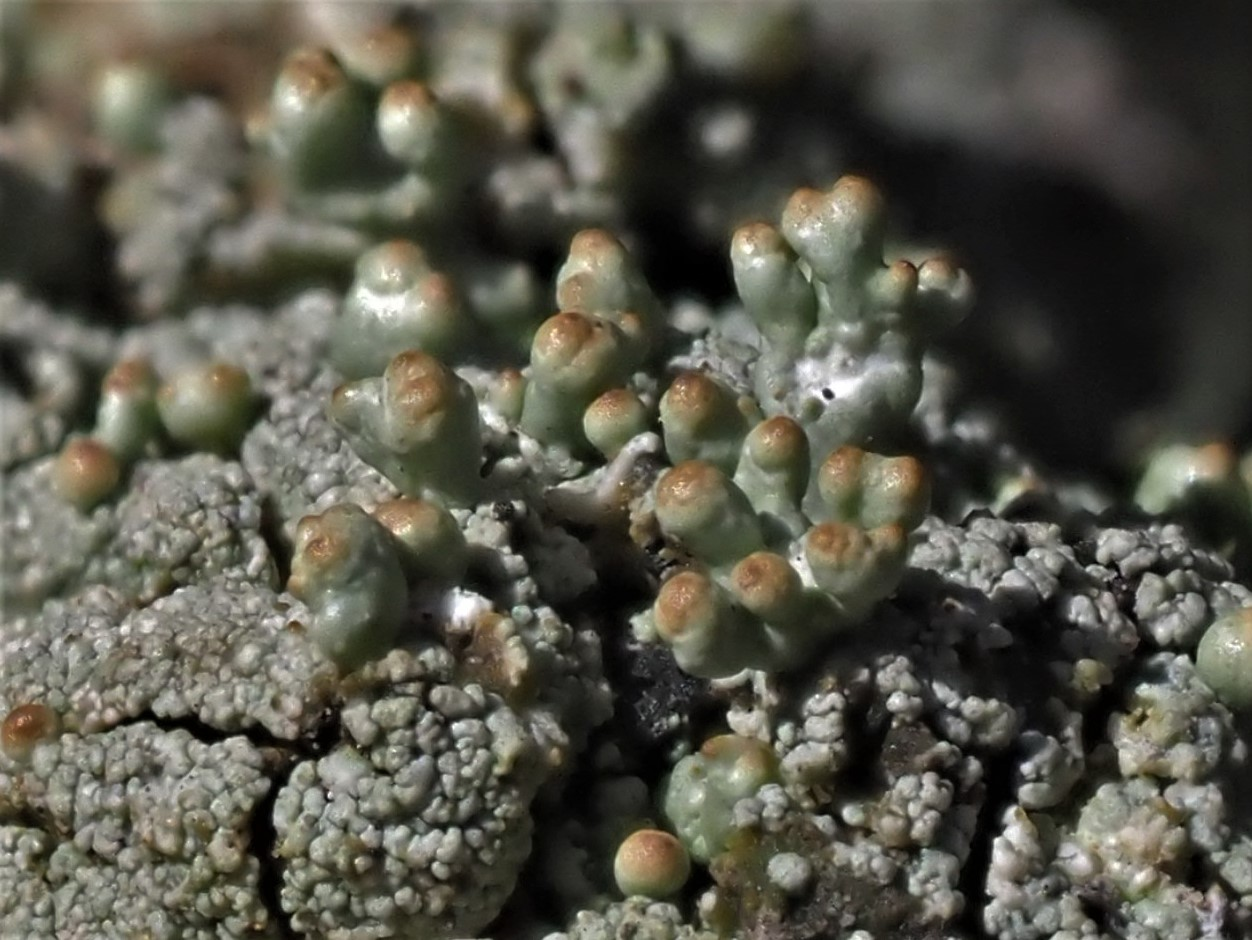
Pycnothelia papillaria

- Calathaspis I.M.Lamb & W.A.Weber (1972) – 1 sp.
- Carassea S.Stenroos (2002) – 1 sp.
- Cetradonia J.C.Wei & Ahti (2002) – 1 sp.
- Cladia Nyl. (1870) – ca. 27 spp.
- Cladonia Hill ex P.Browne (1756) – ca. 500 spp.
- Gymnoderma Nyl. (1860) – 3 spp.
- Heteromyces Müll.Arg. (1889) – 1 sp.
- Metus D.J.Galloway & P.James (1987) – 3 spp.
- Muhria P.M.Jørg. (1987) – 1 sp.
- Notocladonia S.Hammer (2003) – 2 spp.
- Paralecia Brackel, Greiner, Peršoh & Rambold (2015) – 1 sp.
- Pilophorus Th.Fr. (1857) – 17 spp.
- Pulchrocladia S.Stenroos, Pino-Bodas, Lumbsch & Ahti (2018) – 3 spp.
- Pycnothelia Dufour (1821) – 2 spp.
- Rexiella S.Stenroos, Pino-Bodas & Ahti (2019) – 1 sp.
- Sphaerophoropsis Vain. (1890) – 2 spp.
- Squamella S.Hammer (2001) – 1 sp.
- Thysanothecium Mont. & Berk. (1846) – 3 spp.

Myelorrhiza was transferred from the Cladoniaceae to the Ramalinaceae by Sonja Kistenich and colleagues in 2018. Neophyllis, originally classified in the Cladoniaceae, was transferred to Sphaerophoraceae in 1999.

== Habitat and distribution ==
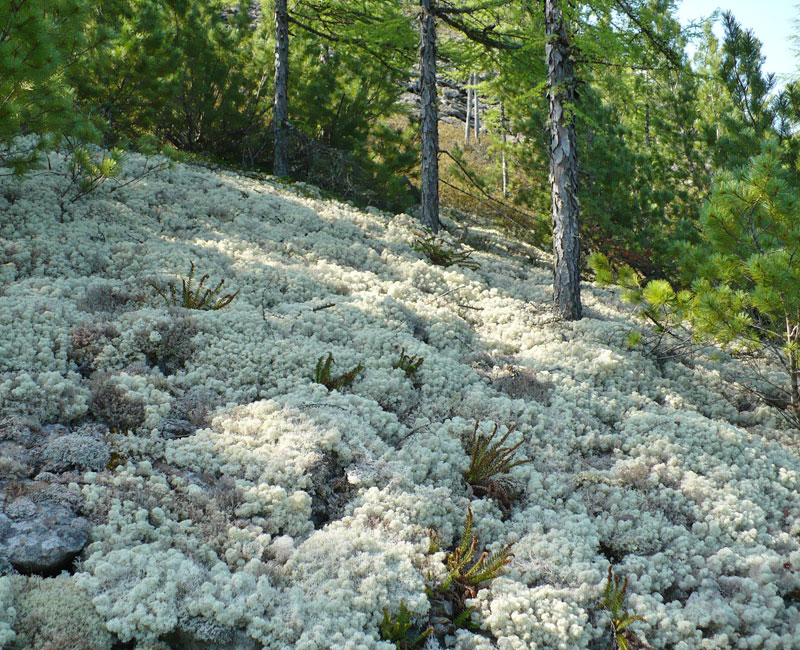
Reindeer moss as a ground cover in Russia

Cladoniaceae species have been recorded growing in many habitats and on a diversity of substrates, including soil, tree trunks, and rotten wood. In a few cases, Cladoniaceae can grow on rocks, such as Cladonia salmonea which grows on the rock faces of vertical cliffs, or Cladonia pyxidata, which can grow on thin soil on rocks. Cladoniaceae species are generally absent from arid environments due to their preference for humid conditions. The range of their habitats includes boreal forests, bogs, temperate forests, the tundra of the Arctic and Antarctic, man-made habitats (e.g. roadsides), tropical highlands, and the sandy tropical lowlands of the Amazon rainforest.

In his 2000 monograph on the Cladoniaceae of the Neotropical realm, Ahti included 184 species in 4 genera, and showed that South America is a hotspot of biodiversity for genus Clanodia. Bioclimatic variables strongly influence the distribution of Cladoniaceae species richness in the Neotropics, particularly under conditions of low precipitation and temperature, and high climatic variability. Areas with stable climates and higher temperatures and precipitation tend to support greater species richness. Twenty-six Cladoniaceae species (25 Cladonia and 1 Cladia) are known to occur in the Galápagos Islands. There, some species form mats on lava flows that have developed little soil. A 2013 monograph of Northern European Cladoniaceae treated 100 species (95 Cladonia, 4 Pilophorus, and the monotypic genus Pycnothelia). In the 2021 key to lichen species in Italy, 86 Cladoniaceae are included. In Bulgaria, 55 species in two genera were reported in 2022. In a study of the lichen biodiversity in Kazakhstan's Burabay National Park, the Cladoniaceae made up about 30 percent of the species diversity.

In western North America, the Coast Mountains of British Columbia act as a key phytogeographic barrier. This results in distinct oceanic and continental taxa groupings on either side. The research also suggests that the southern boundaries of certain species may be determined more by historical rather than purely ecological factors, indicating possible range expansions. The highest diversity of Cladonia species is found in British Columbia between 52°N and 56°N, an area that was covered by glaciers until about 10,000 to 13,000 years ago. The Cladoniaceae biodiversity in this region represents the richest assemblage of the family in western North America. Species diversity declines sharply south of 52°N, with a loss of three to five taxa for each degree of latitude.

The glacial history of the region has played a crucial role in shaping the current distribution of Cladoniaceae. During the Pleistocene, most species likely survived in areas south of the Cordilleran ice sheet, with some persisting in nunataks, arctic regions, or small coastal refugia. This glacial legacy is still evident in the family's current distribution patterns. Cladoniaceae show a preference for specific habitats, with greater floristic and chemical diversity observed in humid areas and lower forested elevations compared to arid regions and alpine zones. This suggests that many species in the family are adapted to environments with relatively short periods of desiccation. The post-glacial period has seen major changes in the distribution of Cladoniaceae. Many species that likely existed in Washington, Oregon, and California during the Pleistocene are now absent from these areas. This change is thought to be a result of climate shifts since deglaciation, particularly an increase in summer moisture deficits. While most Cladoniaceae species have reached a stable distribution, some are still in flux. Species like Cladina stellaris and C. trassii appear to be continuing their southward expansion from northern glacial refugia.

Biogeographic analyses published in 2026 suggested that the present distribution of Cladonia was shaped by a mixture of land-based dispersal and long-distance movement. The study found support for exchanges between the Palearctic and Nearctic regions through Beringian connections, movement from the Palearctic into Oceania by Miocene stepping-stone routes, and transoceanic dispersal between South America, Africa, and Australasia. The authors did not recover strong support for an ancient Gondwanan origin of Cladonia; instead, the Palearctic, especially eastern Asia, received somewhat better support as an ancestral area, though with considerable uncertainty.

== Conservation ==
Each of the six Cladoniaceae species that have been assessed by the International Union for Conservation of Nature for the global IUCN Red List face a variety of threats impacting their survival. Cetradonia linearis (vulnerable, 2015) is endangered by ecosystem changes in spruce–fir forests, specifically the balsam woolly adelgid's impact on Fraser fir, and changes in humidity regimes and cloud immersion. The species is also vulnerable to threats from logging, mining, and road building if its legal protection status is removed.

Cladonia appalachiensis (endangered, 2020) growing on high-elevation Anakeesta Knob rock, faces threats from visitor disruption and changes in cloud cover and humidity. The species is particularly vulnerable due to its restricted range and specific habitat requirements. The main threats to Cladonia perforata (endangered, 2003) include habitat loss, hurricanes, and improper fire management, with a single natural event potentially causing substantial subpopulation reduction.

IUCN-listed Cladoniaceae species
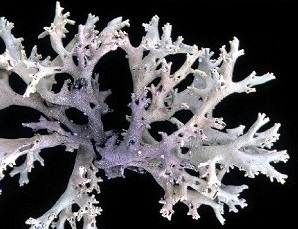
Cladonia perforata, endangered species since 2003

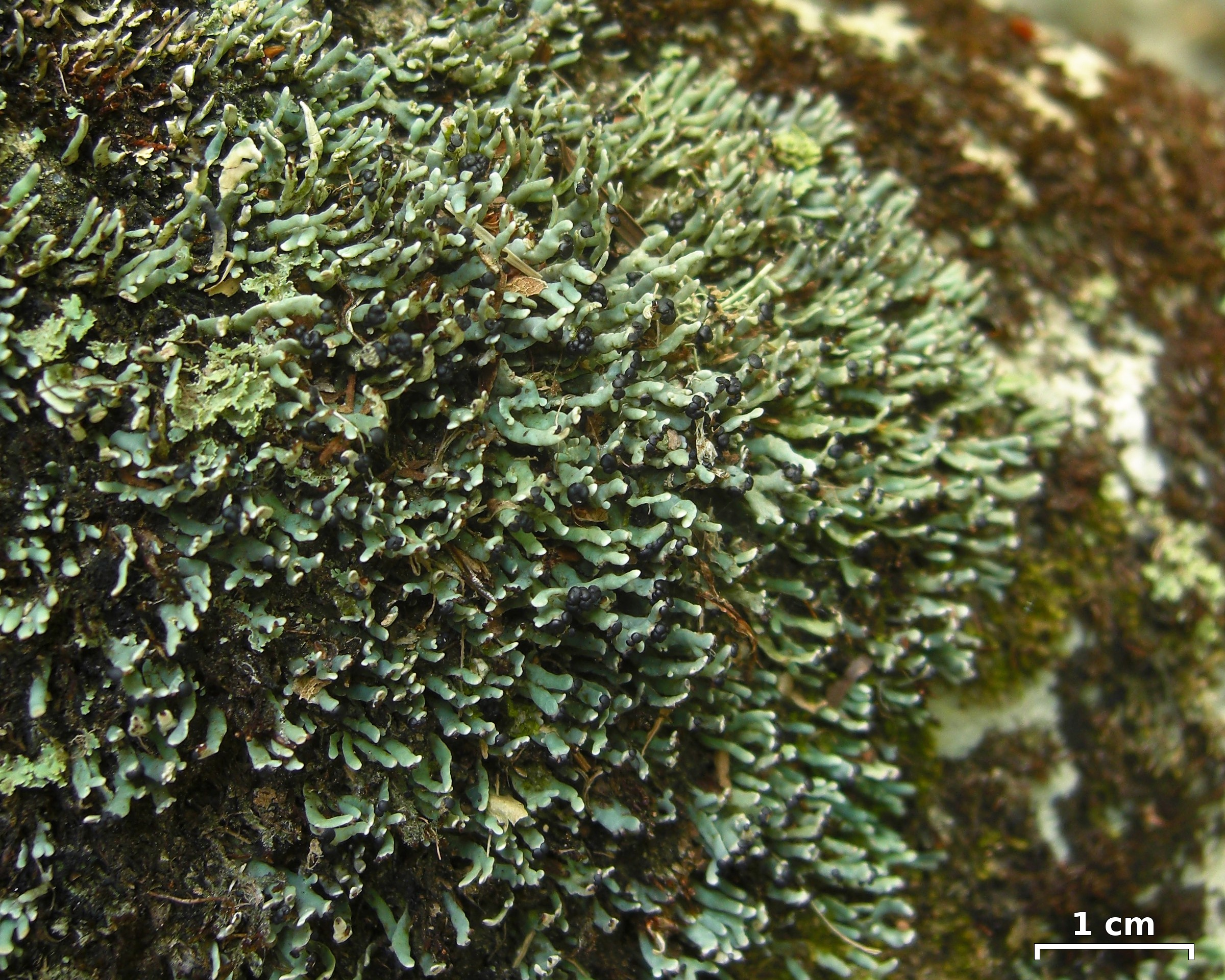
Cetradonia linearis

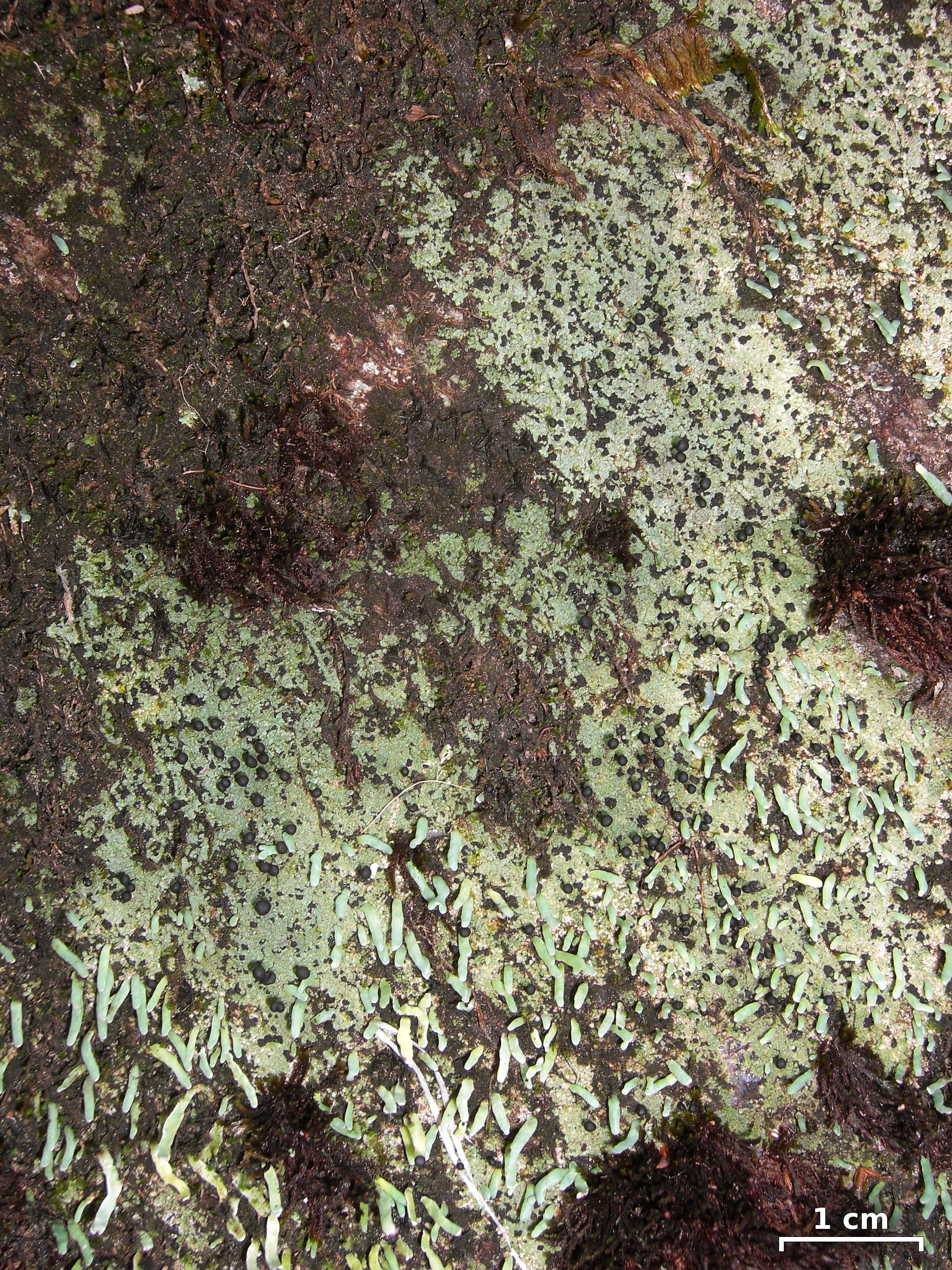
Two rare species of Cladoniaceae together in the Great Smoky Mountains: Pilophorus fibula and C. linearis

Cladonia submitis (endangered, 2020) is primarily threatened by habitat loss and degradation due to land development, particularly around metropolitan areas. Climate change also poses risks through altered fire regimes and sea level rise, affecting its pine barren and sand dune habitats. The species' limited distribution and specific habitat requirements make it particularly susceptible to these threats. Pilophorus fibula (endangered, 2020) is threatened by habitat loss, alteration of hydrological regimes, recreational damage, and declining water quality. The species is found in a limited number of locations, making it vulnerable to local extinctions.

Gymnoderma insulare (endangered, 2014), primarily found in old-growth forests in Japan and Taiwan, faces threats from natural hazards like typhoons and is affected by the decline of its tree hosts, Cryptomeria japonica and Chamaecyparis obtusa. The species' dependence on specific host trees and old-growth forest conditions makes it particularly vulnerable to forest degradation and climate change impacts.

On the red list of China's macrofungi, Cladonia delavayi (vulnerable), Cladonia pseudoevansii (critically endangered), Gymnoderma coccocarpum (endangered), and Gymnoderma insulare (endangered) are the representatives of the Cladoniaceae.

== Human interactions and uses ==
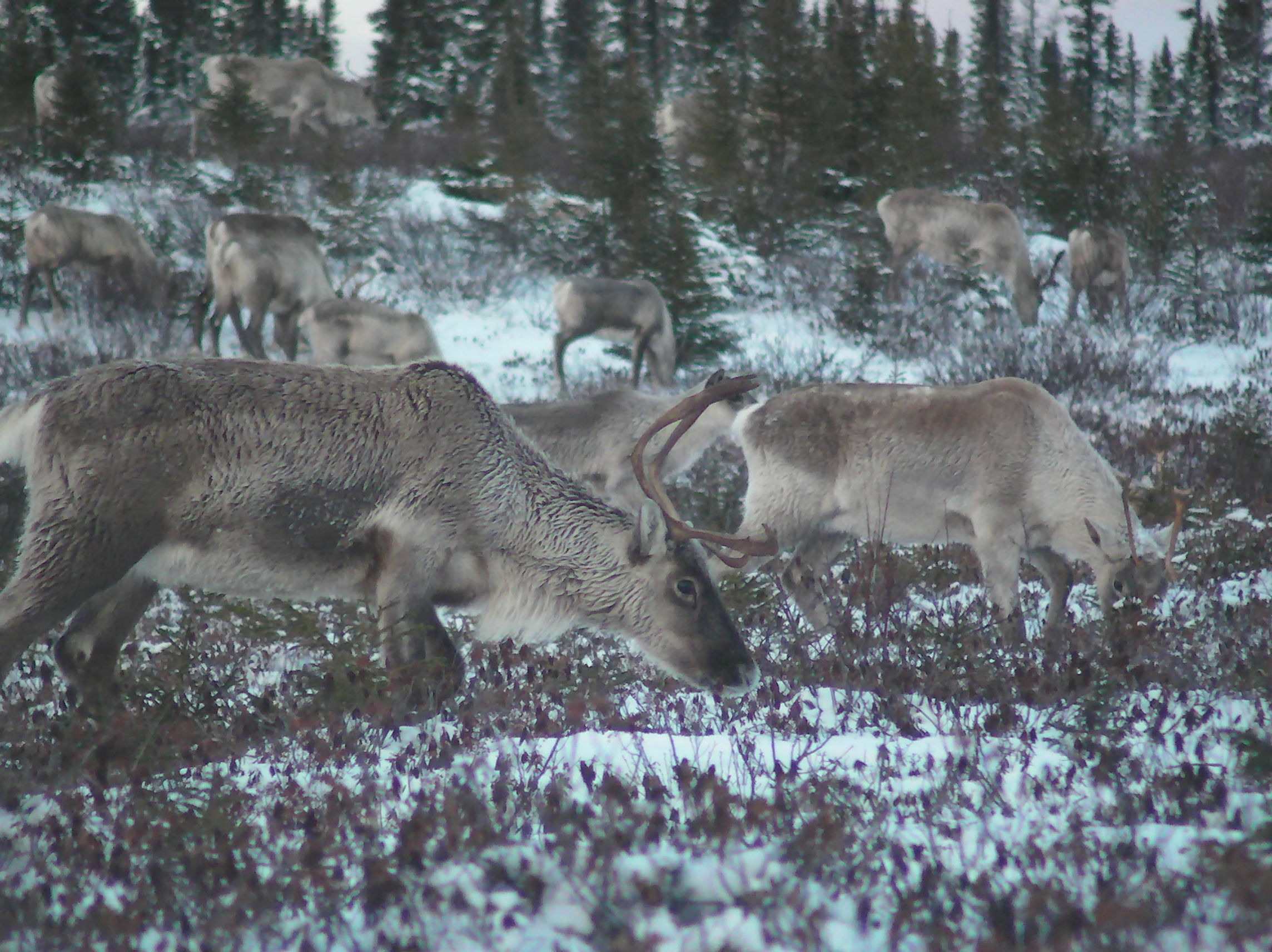
Caribou grazing for Cladonia

Cladonia lichens, particularly the "reindeer lichens" such as C. stellaris, C. rangiferina, and C. arbuscula, are a critical winter food source for reindeer (caribou) in northern boreal and arctic regions. In some areas, these lichens can constitute up to 80% of reindeer winter diet. The average annual linear growth rate of these reindeer lichens is about 5 mm per year, accounting for their slow recovery rate after grazing or disturbance. Satellite-based studies have shown a marked decline in caribou lichen cover across large areas of Eastern Canada over the past three decades, likely due to factors such as climate change-induced shrub encroachment, increased wildfire frequency, and grazing pressure, which could have serious implications for caribou populations and ecosystem dynamics. The abundance of lichen-rich forests has important economic implications for reindeer husbandry, particularly for indigenous Sámi people in Fennoscandia. However, lichen-dominated forests have declined considerably in recent decades due to factors such as intensive forestry practices, overgrazing, and fire suppression. This decline has prompted efforts to restore lichen habitats, including experimental transplantation of lichen fragments to accelerate recovery after disturbances like forest fires.

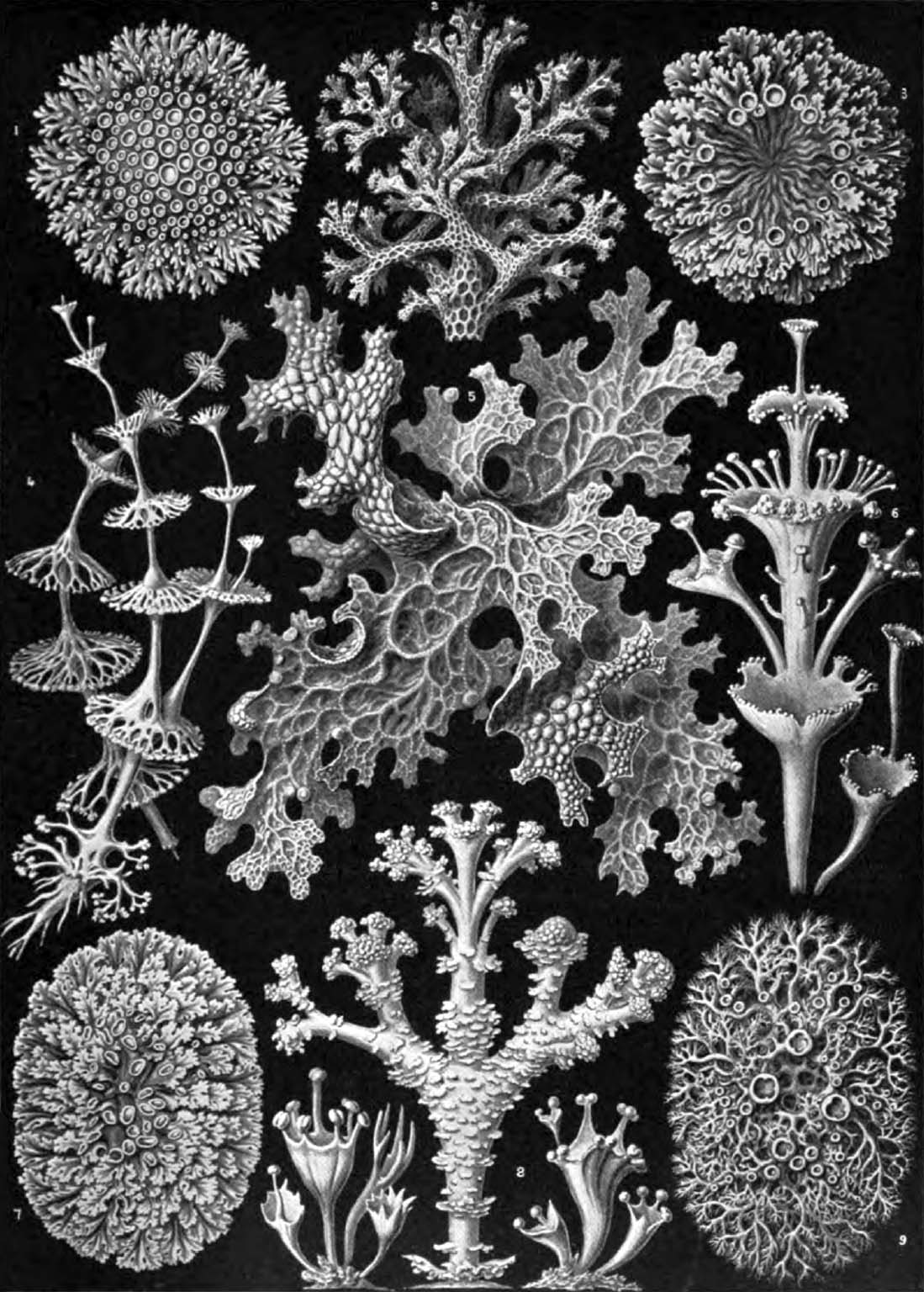
Five Cladoniaceae species are depicted in Haeckel's 1904 lichen lithograph.

Some Cladoniaceae species are exploited in a profitable export business for decorative uses, with demand reaching thousands of kilograms. In Europe, Cladonia stellaris is used ornamentally in wreaths, floral decorations and architectural models. From 1970–1975, an average of nearly 3000 metric tonnes were exported each year from Finland, Norway and Sweden; most of these exports (about 80%) went to West Germany. Fruticose Cladonia species, often dyed green and glycerol-treated for flexibility, are common in model train displays as miniature trees and shrubs. The product commercially sold as "ball moss" or "Icelandic moss" in hobby and craft stores is often Cladonia stellaris and other similar species, often dyed in various colours. In Sweden, Cladonia lichens were used historically as a partial insulation for storm windows.

The complex net-like structures of the Australasian lichen Pulchrocladia retipora have been described as "of considerable beauty resembling lace or coral", and have been utilised in floral and architectural design. This species' branches, characterised by its numerous small holes, exemplify nature's efficient use of latticework structures. This design, widely used in construction for structures such as transmission towers or bridges, allows the organism to maintain structural integrity while minimising the amount of biological material used in its construction. The unique lichen architectures of five Cladoniaceae species are depicted in Ernst Haeckel's well-known and widely reproduced lichen-themed lithograph in his 1904 work Kunstformen der Nature (The art forms of nature). According to the lichenologists Robert Lücking and Toby Spribille, "the Cladonia growth form continues to be one of the most widely recognized lichen architectures, with their basal scales and erect, often trumpet-shaped podetia".
