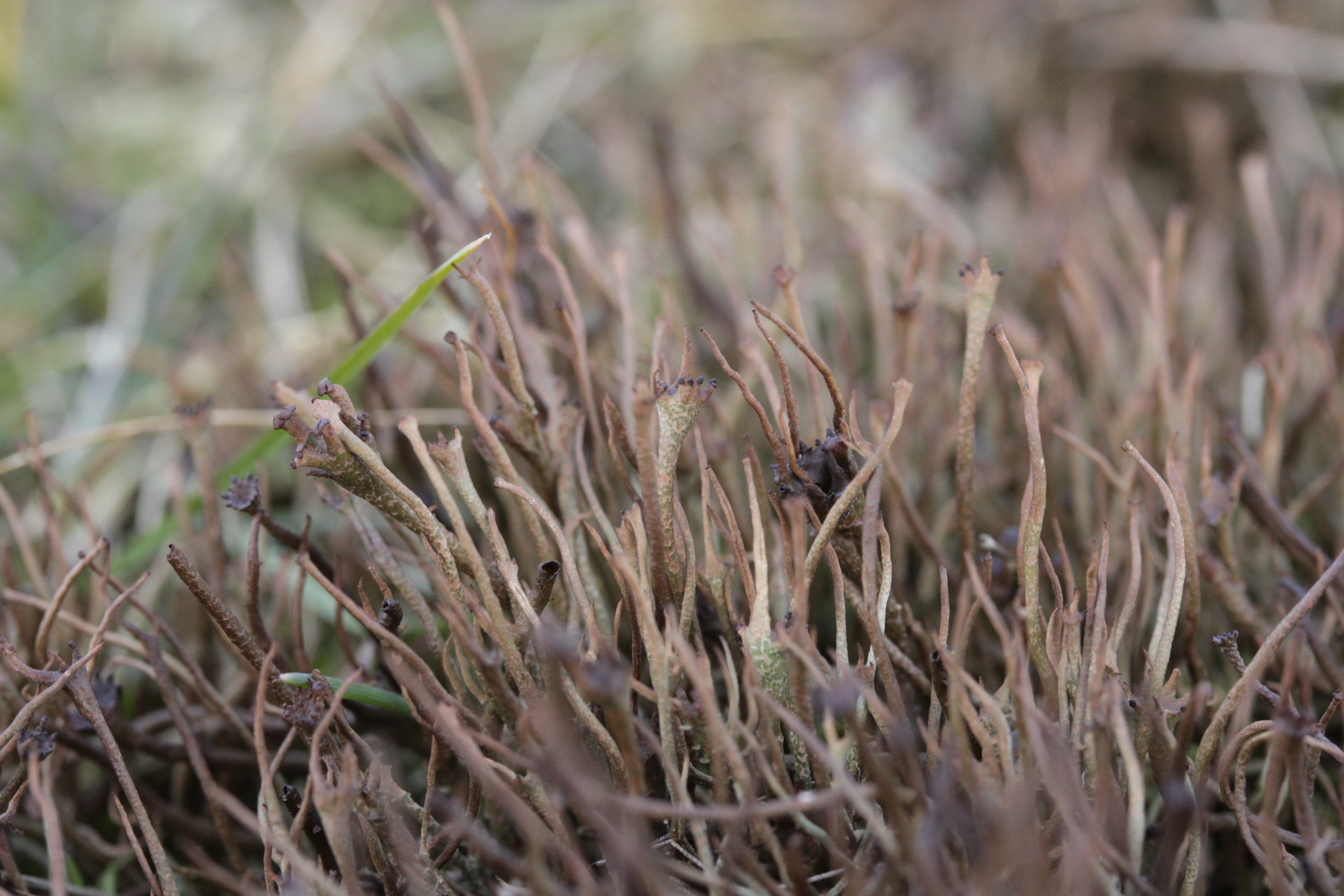

Conservation status
- Secure (NatureServe)

Scientific classification
- Kingdom: Fungi
- Division: Ascomycota
- Class: Lecanoromycetes
- Order: Lecanorales
- Family: Cladoniaceae
- Genus: Cladonia
- Species: C. gracilis

Binomial name
- Cladonia gracilis (L.) Willd. (1787)

Synonyms
- Lichen gracilis L. (1753); Lichen pyxidatus var. gracilis (L.) Weiss (1770); Baeomyces gracilis (L.) Ach. (1803); Capitularia gracilis (L.) Flörke (1810); Cenomyce ecmocyna var. gracilis (L.) Ach. (1810); Cenomyce ecmocyna f. gracilis (L.) Ach. (1814); Cenomyce gracilis (L.) Dufour (1817); Scyphophorus cornutus var. gracilis (L.) Mérat (1821); Scyphophorus ecmocynus var. gracilis (L.) Gray (1821)

= Cladonia gracilis =

Species of lichen-forming fungus

Cladonia gracilis or the smooth cup lichen is a species of fruticose, cup lichen in the family Cladoniaceae. It was first described as a new species by Carl Linnaeus in his 1753 work Species Plantarum. German botanist Carl Ludwig Willdenow transferred it to the genus Cladonia in 1787. In North America, it is known colloquially as the "smooth Cladonia".

The Cladonia gracilis group is a monophyletic group of species that all are morphologically similar to C. gracilis. In this group, the delimitations of species is difficult due to the morphological similarity between taxa, and the fact that many of the characters used to classify species are influenced by environmental factors such as light exposure, temperature or humidity.

== See also ==
- List of Cladonia species
- List of lichens named by Carl Linnaeus
