= Paralecia =

Scientific classification
- Domain: Eukaryota
- Kingdom: Fungi
- Division: Ascomycota
- Class: Lecanoromycetes
- Order: Lecanorales
- Family: Cladoniaceae
- Genus: Paralecia; Brackel, Greiner, Peršoh & Rambold (2015)
- Species: P. pratorum

Binomial name
- Paralecia pratorum Brackel, Greiner, Peršoh & Rambold (2015)

Genus of fungi

Paralecia is a monotypic fungal genus in the family Cladoniaceae. It contains a single species, the lichenicolous fungus Paralecia pratorum, found in Europe.

== Taxonomy ==
Both the species and the genus were described as new to science in 2015 by Wolfgang von Brackel, Katrin Greiner, Derek Peršoh, and Gerhard Rambold. The type specimen was collected in Tuscany, Italy, in Prati di Logarghena above the city of Pontremoli. Here it was found growing on the lichen Protoparmeliopsis muralis, which itself was growing on schistose rock outcrops in a meadow, at an altitude of 845 m (2,772 ft). The genus name Paralecia combines para- (meaning "along with, beside") and lecia, which refers to the lecideine apothecia produced by the fungus. The specific epithet pratorum, which is derived from the Latin pratum (meaning "meadow"), alludes to the type locality – the meadows of Logarghena.

Initially, the genus was tentatively placed in the family Squamarinaceae, because DNA analysis suggested a close relationship to genus Squamarina. In 2018, Kraichak and colleagues revised the Lecanoromycetes to use temporal-based classification, and placed the Squamarinaceae in synonymy with the Cladoniaceae.

== Description ==
Paralecia pratorum is endothallic, meaning it grows within the tissue of its host. Its apothecia eventually break through the cortex of its host; these structures are black, more or less round with a flattened to convex top, and measure 0.2–0.45 in diameter. The apothecia produce ascospores that are hyaline (translucent), ellipsoid in shape, and typical have dimensions of 11.8–13.7 by 4.7–5.6 μm. The fungus does not appear to harm its host, but causes the formation of new lobes, and somewhat inhibits the formation of host apothecia.

== Distribution ==
In addition to its initial report from Italy, the fungus has subsequently been recorded from Montenegro and Sweden.
