= Ernst Kernstock =

Ernst Kernstock (5 August 1852 in Graz – 14 April 1900 in Klagenfurt) was a schoolteacher and lichenologist from Austria-Hungary.

While a student, he worked as an assistant in the botanical laboratory at the University of Graz. After receiving his qualification as a teacher of natural history, mathematics and physics in 1877, he worked for many years as an instructor in Bolzano (1877–1895). From 1895 onward, he taught classes at the Realschule in Klagenfurt. His herbarium was obtained by the Natural History Museum in Vienna.

== Selected published works ==
- Die Flechten der Koralpe und ihres Gebietes in Steiermark, in: Jahresber. des akad. naturwiss. Ver. in Graz 2, 1876, S. 43–86. (The lichens of Koralpe and its areas in Styria).
- Die Flechten von Bozen und Umgebung, in: Jahresber. der k.k. Staats-Unterrealschule in Bozen 8, 1882/83, S. 3–35, Sonderdruck, 1883. (The lichens of Bolzano and surrounding areas).
- Die europäischen Cladonien, in: Jahresber. der Staats-Oberrealschule zu Klagenfurt 43, 1900, S. 3–36. (European Cladoniaceae).
