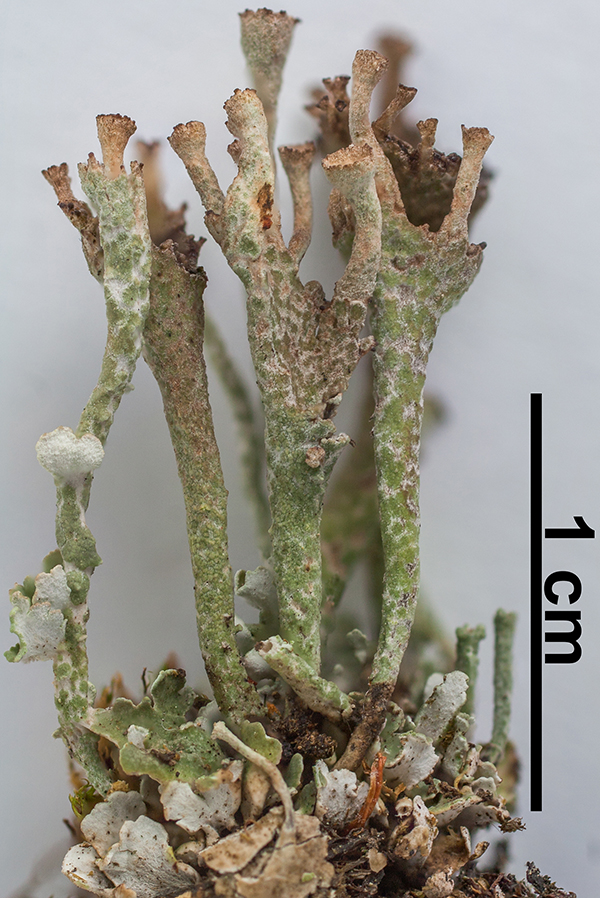

Conservation status
- Secure (NatureServe)

Scientific classification
- Kingdom: Fungi
- Division: Ascomycota
- Class: Lecanoromycetes
- Order: Lecanorales
- Family: Cladoniaceae
- Genus: Cladonia
- Species: C. cervicornis

Binomial name
- Cladonia cervicornis (Ach.) Flot. (1849)

Synonyms
- Lichen cervicornis Ach. (1799)

= Cladonia cervicornis =

Species of lichen

Cladonia cervicornis is a species of cup lichen in the family Cladoniaceae. It was first described by Swedish lichenologist Erik Acharius in 1799 as Lichen cervicornis. Julius von Flotow transferred it to the genus Cladonia in 1849. In North America, it is colloquially known as the ladder lichen or elk's-horn cup lichen.

== See also ==
- List of Cladonia species
