= Karl Christian Traugott Friedemann Goebel =

German pharmacist (1794–1851)

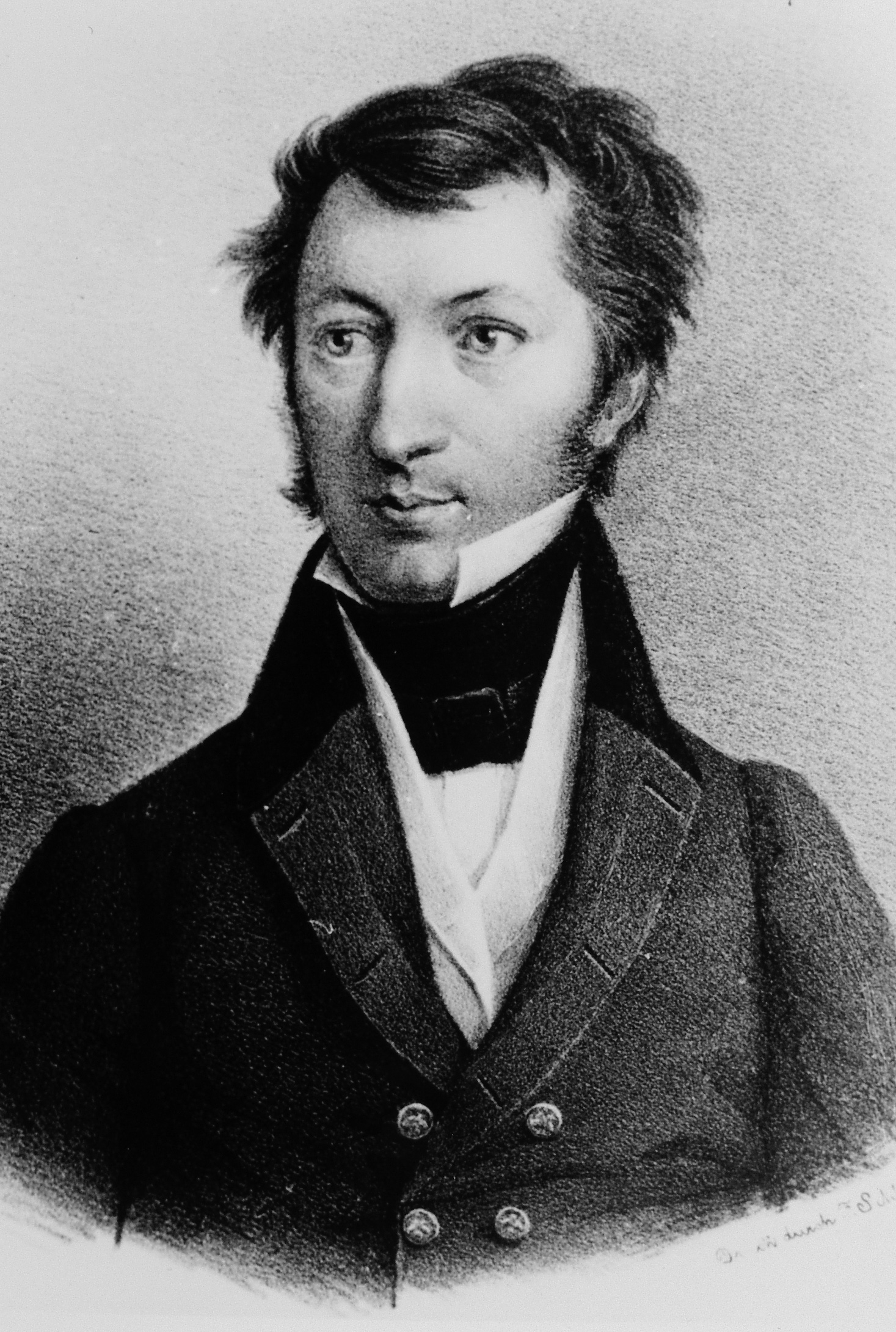
Carl Christoph Göbel (1794–1851)

Karl Christian Traugott Friedemann Goebel (21 February 1794, Niederroßla – 26 May 1851, Dorpat) was a German pharmacist and chemist.

Following training under an apothecary in Eisenach, he studied pharmacy at the University of Jena from 1813. In 1821 he was appointed head of the university pharmacy. In 1824 he became a professor at Jena, followed by a professorship of chemistry and physics at the Imperial University of Dorpat in 1828.

The botanical genus Goebelia Bunge ex Boiss. 1872 (family Leguminosae) commemorates his name.

== Written works ==
- Grundlinien der pharmaceutischen Chemie und Stöchiometrie, 1821, third edition 1840 – Fundamentals of pharmaceutical chemistry and stoichiometry.
- Arzneimittel-Prüfungslehre, oder Anleitung zur Prüfe, 1824, second edition 1833 – Drug testing doctrine, etc.
- Pharmaceutische Waarenkunde mit illuminierten Kupfern, (with Gustav Kunze, Ernst Schenk), 1827–34, two volumes.
- Reise in die Steppen des südlichen Rußlands : unternommen von Goebel in Begleitung C. Claus u. A. Bergmann, 1838, two volumes. – Journey to the steppes of southern Russia; undertaken by Goebel in accompaniment with Karl Ernst Claus and A. Bergmann.
- Das Seebad bei Pernau an der Ostsee, 1845 – The seaside resort at Pärnu on the Baltic Sea.
- Die Grundlehren der Pharmacie, 1843–47, four volumes. – Basic instruction of pharmacy.
- Agriculturchemie für Vorträge auf Universitaten und landwirtschaftlichen Lehranstalten, 1850. – Agricultural chemistry for lectures at universities and agricultural colleges.
