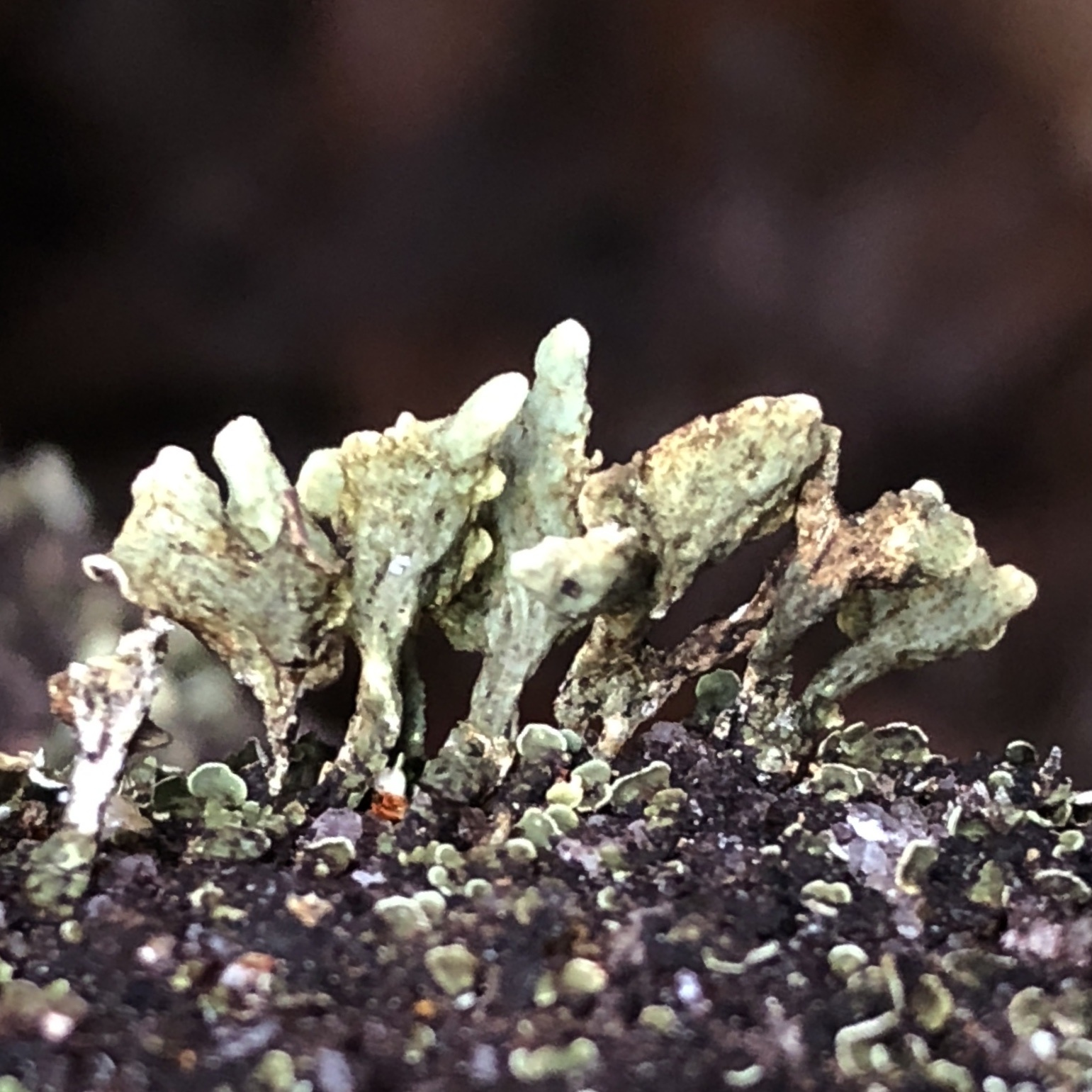
- Thysanothecium hookeri

Scientific classification
- Domain: Eukaryota
- Kingdom: Fungi
- Division: Ascomycota
- Class: Lecanoromycetes
- Order: Lecanorales
- Family: Cladoniaceae
- Genus: Thysanothecium; Mont. & Berk. (1846)

Type species
- Thysanothecium hookeri Mont. & Berk. (1846)

Species
- T. hookeri; T. scutellatum; T. sorediatum

= Thysanothecium =

Genus of fungi

Thysanothecium is a genus of three species of lichenized fungi in the family Cladoniaceae. The genus was circumscribed by Camille Montagne and Miles Joseph Berkeley in 1846. The original specimens of the type species, T. hookeri, were collected from the area of Swan River (Australia) by James Drummond, who sent them for to William Jackson Hooker for further analysis.
