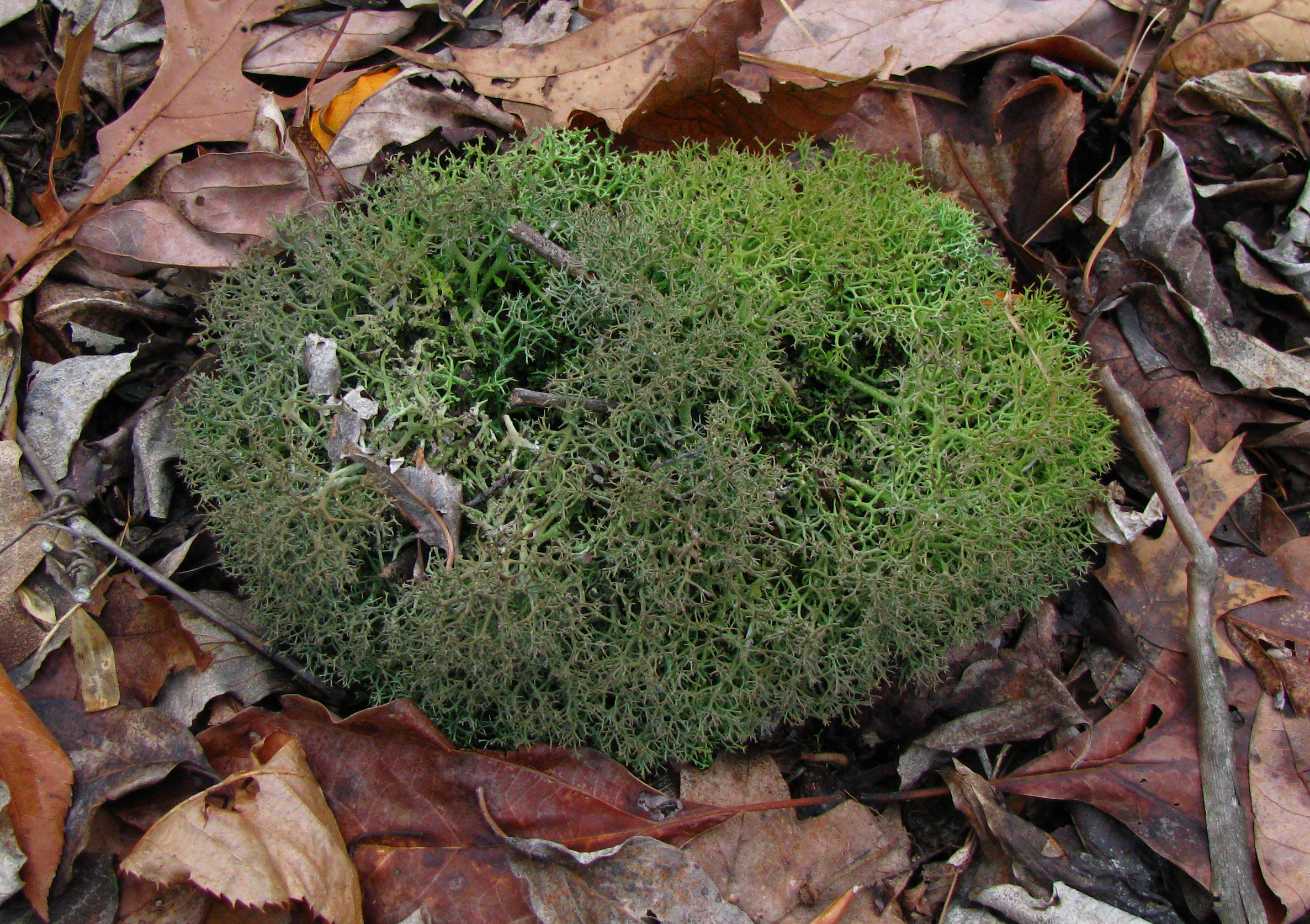

Conservation status
- Secure (NatureServe)

Scientific classification
- Kingdom: Fungi
- Division: Ascomycota
- Class: Lecanoromycetes
- Order: Lecanorales
- Family: Cladoniaceae
- Genus: Cladonia
- Species: C. furcata

Binomial name
- Cladonia furcata (Huds.) Baumg. (1790)

Synonyms
- Lichen furcatus Huds. (1762) (basionym)

= Cladonia furcata =

Species of lichen-forming fungus

Cladonia furcata or the many-forked cup lichen is a species of cup lichen in the family Cladoniaceae. It has an intermediate to tolerant air pollution sensitivity. Extracts of this species have been shown to kill leukemia cells in vitro, and may have possible value in the treatment of cancer.

== Description ==
Like most other lichens in the genus Cladonia, the fruiting body of C. furcata is made of a flattened primary thallus and a secondary upright stalk that forms the secondary thallus. The secondary thallus – the podetium – is extensively branched, and may reach up to 10 centimetres (4 in) tall. The podetia ranges in color from grayish or pale green to brown. The axil, the inner junction of a branchlet with a branch or with another branchlet, is open, with inrolled branches, and frequently with a longitudinal groove that extends down the podetium from the axil. The fertile (reproductive) branches of this lichen are more or less flattened, and often grooved. C. furcata does not have the vegetative reproductive structures soredia and isidia, but instead has apothecia—cup-like ascocarps that contain asci on which ascospores are borne. The apothecia are brown, small, and borne at the end of the branches.

== Habitat and distribution ==
Cladonia furcata is most commonly found in forests near coastlines, at low to mid elevations. It may be found growing on moss, humus, and soil, more rarely on rotten wood or at the base of trees. In Nepal, Cladonia furcata has been reported from 1,700 to 3,900 m elevation in a compilation of published records. In North America, it is found from Alaska to California, and is very common in the west Cascade Range.

== Sensitivity to agrochemicals ==
A field experiment on the effects of various common agrochemicals (mineral fertilizer, lime and calcium cyanamide) as well as organic fertilizer (manure) on C. furcata revealed that mineral fertilizer had no direct effect on lichen growth, manure promoted the length of the podetia, and calcium cyanamide proved to be lethal to C. furcata. Another study showed that application of fertilizers containing either a combination of nitrogen, phosphorus and potassium, or solely potassium had a significant stimulatory effect on the growth of C. furcata.

== Bioactive compounds ==
Polysaccharides isolated from C. furcata were shown to induce cell death (apoptosis) in human leukemia K562 cells. Furthermore, C. furcata polysaccharides decreased the activity of telomerase, an enzyme that helps some cancer cells avoid death; this activity suggests possible therapeutic potential in the treatment of cancer.

== See also ==
- List of Cladonia species
