= Calathaspis =

Scientific classification
- Kingdom: Fungi
- Division: Ascomycota
- Class: Lecanoromycetes
- Order: Lecanorales
- Family: Cladoniaceae
- Genus: Calathaspis; I.M.Lamb & W.A.Weber (1972)
- Species: C. devexa

Binomial name
- Calathaspis devexa I.M.Lamb & W.A.Weber (1972)

Single-species lichen genus

Calathaspis is a fungal genus in the family Cladoniaceae. A monotypic genus, Calathaspis contains the single species Calathaspis devexa, which is found in Papua New Guinea in middle- and high-elevation forests at altitudes ranging from 2,000–4,000 metres (6,600–13,100 ft).

== Taxonomy ==
The genus was introduced as new by I. M. Lamb (later Elke Mackenzie) and William Alfred Weber with C. devexa as the type and only known species. The genus name, which combines the Greek κάλαθος ('vase-shaped vessel') and ἀσπίς ('shield'), refers to the shape of the apothecia. The species epithet devexa, from the Latin devexus ("sloping downward"), refers to the arrangement of the thalline laciniae. The authors argued for inclusion in the family Cladoniaceae after studying how the fruiting bodies develop: the reproductive (generative) tissues are formed first, then briefly sheathed by vegetative tissues, and the mature apothecium and its short stalk are composed largely of generative tissue. In practical terms, that makes the stalk a true podetium (a podetium is a tiny stalk that supports the spore-bearing disc). This method of development, together with overall form, aligns Calathaspis most closely with Gymnoderma, although Calathaspis has more complex, transversely multiseptate spores rather than simple, non-septate ones.

== Description ==
The lichen body (thallus) forms dense, minute cushions of crowded, scale-like lobes (squamules). Individual lobes are 2–5 mm long and 0.3–0.6 (rarely up to 0.8) mm wide, mostly prostrate to slightly spreading, divided sub-dichotomously or fan-like, and attached by their bases without any root-like rhizines. The upper surface is matt and glaucous-green when moist; the lower surface is whitish, smooth and without veins. No cephalodia, isidia or soredia are present. The green algal partner is trebouxioid and occurs in a continuous layer beneath a hyaline, gelatinised upper cortex 20–75 μm thick; the medulla is almost transparent and made of loosely interwoven fungal hyphae. The lower cortex is thinner and less distinct.

Fruiting bodies (apothecia) arise from the underside of the squamules and look like small dark discs on short stalks. They are round, scutelliform and distinctly pedicellate, 0.8–1.2 mm in diameter, with a blackish, matt disc that is plane to slightly concave and a thin, persistent margin. Internally the margin is a thick-walled, pseudoparenchymatous tissue lacking algae; the hypothecium is yellow-brown above; the hymenium is 110–150 μm high with a yellow-brown epithecium. Paraphyses are slender and filamentous with slightly knobbed tips; asci are clavate, mostly 8-spored, 120–135 × 20–28 μm. Spores are colourless, strongly refractive, naviculoid-fusiform, bluntly tapered at both ends and transversely multiseptate with 7–9 thin septa, measuring 45–50 × 11–13 μm. Standard spot tests are K− and C−; PD is positive rose-red on the pale underside; the medulla is iodine-negative, but the ascus wall and hymenial gel are iodine-positive with a persistent blue reaction.

== Habitat and distribution ==
Calathaspis devexa is known from the Eastern Highlands of New Guinea, where it has been collected around Mount Wilhelm (near Lake Aunde, about 3,500 m elevation) and Daulo Pass (roughly 2,500 m). Based on the sites and local forest belts, the authors suggested it likely occurs more widely in mid- to high-elevation forests between roughly 2,000 and 4,000 m. Substrates recorded include saplings of rhododendron and Olearia in subalpine forest mosaics and in regenerating "mossy forest".

The species is usually on water-soaked, often declining branches of small trees (about 2–10 cm diameter), mingling with liverworts such as Frullania, Radula and Metzgeria or with loose moss tufts. It appears limited by both extremes: thick bryophyte cover (light competition) and clean, healthy bark (too dry). Thalli tend to grow downwards from the point of attachment; when dry, the small lobes curl up and out to expose the white underside and frame the black discs, but in the predominantly wet conditions of these forests the plant is easily overlooked. Occasional co-occurrence with the lichen Compsocladium archboldianum was noted on Mount Wilhelm.
