= List of common names of lichen genera =

This is a list of common names of lichen genera. When a common name for a lichen genus is the same as the scientific name for that genus, it is not included in the following list. This list only includes genera common names that are widely used, as indicated by the common name either appearing in a peer reviewed scientific publication or in a scientifically reliable reference source.

A common name for a lichen genus will often uniquely refer to that genus, but not always. Sometimes the same common name may refer to several different genera, which may not be related by sharing common ancestry. An example is that "wart lichen" refers to at least five different genera in four different families. Sometimes the same genus may have more than one widely used common name. For example, members of the genus Staurothele are commonly called "wart lichens", and also "rock pimples". Lichen genus common names may come from the shape, color, or other feature of some members of a genus. Other members may not share that trait, but are still referred to by the common name for the genus. For example, Caloplaca albovariegata is an orange lichen, but it is not orange in color.

Lichen species common names are often the same as the common name of the genus they are in, or are a modification of that common name by adding an adjective. But sometimes the parts of a lichen species common name are common names of other lichen genera. For example, Psilolechia lucida, in the genus Psilolechia, is commonly called "sulphur dust lichen". But "sulphur lichen" refers to the genus Fulgensia, and "dust lichen" refers either to the genus Chrysothrix or the genus Lepraria.

== B ==
- Ball lichen - Sphaerophorus
- Barnacle lichen - Thelotrema
- Beard lichen - Usnea
- Birchbark dot lichen - Leptorhaphis
- Blackcurly lichen - Pseudephebe
- Blackthread lichen - Placynthium
- Blemished lichen - Phlyctis
- Blistered navel lichen - Lasallia
- Blood lichen - Mycoblastus
- Bloodstain lichen - Haematomma
- Bowl lichen - Psoroma
- Bran lichen - Parmeliopsis
- Brittle lichen - Cornicularia
- Bullseye lichen - Placopsis
- Bruised lichen - Toninia
- Button lichen - Buellia

== C ==
- Cap lichen - Baeomyces
- Cartilage lichen - Ramalina
- Chocolate chip lichen - Solorina
- Clam lichen - Normandina
- Club lichen - Multiclavula
- Cobblestone lichen - Acarospora
- Cockleshell lichen - Hypocenomyce
- Comma lichen - Arthonia
- Chalice lichen - Endocarpon
- Coral lichen - Sphaerophorus
- Crabseye lichen - Ochrolechia
- Cracked lichen - Acarospora
- Crater lichen - Diploschistes
- Cup lichen - Cladonia

== D ==
- Dimple lichen - Gyalecta
- Disc lichen - Buellia, Tremolecia
- Disk lichen - Lecidea, Trapelia
- Dot lichen - Arthonia, Micarea
- Dotted lichen - Bacidia
- Dust lichen - Chrysothrix, Lepraria

== E ==
- Earth lichen - Catapyrenium
- Eggyolk lichen - Candelariella

== F ==
- Felt lichen - Peltigera
- Firedot lichen - Caloplaca
- Fishscale lichen - Psora
- Fringed lichen - Anaptychia
- Frosted lichen - Physconia

== G ==
- Giant shield lichen - Cetrelia
- Gold lichen - Caloplaca
- Gold dust lichen - Chrysothrix
- Goldspeck lichen - Candelariella
- Granular lichen - Lopadium

== H ==
- Honeycombed lichen - Menegazzia
- Horsehair lichen - Bryoria

== J ==
- Jelly lichen - Collema
- Jewel lichen - Caloplaca

== K ==
- Kidney lichen - Nephroma

== L ==
- Lead lichen - Parmeliella
- Light and dark lichen - Pseudevernia
- Lung lichen - Lobaria

== M ==
- Map lichen - Rhizocarpon
- Matted lichen - Pannaria
- Mealy lichen - Leprocaulon
- Moonglow lichen - Dimelaena
- Mountain lichen - Dimelaena

== N ==
- Nail lichen - Pilophorus
- Navel lichen - Umbilicaria
- Needle lichen - Chaenotheca

== O ==
- Orange lichen - Caloplaca, Xanthomendoza, Xanthoria
- Orange wall lichen - Xanthoria
- Old wood rimmed lichen - Lecanactis

== P ==
- Peppermint drop lichen - Icmadophila
- Pin lichen - Calicium, Chaenotheca
- Pore lichen - Pertusaria
- Puffed sunken disk lichen - Lobothallia

== R ==
- Ragged lichen - Platismatia
- Reindeer lichen - Cladina
- Rim lichen - Lecanora, Squamarina
- Rimmed lichen - Aspicilia
- Rimmed navel lichen - Rhizoplaca
- Ring lichen - Evernia
- Rock-olive lichen - Peltula
- Rock pimples - Staurothele
- Rock-posy lichen - Rhizoplaca
- Rock-shield lichen - Xanthoparmelia
- Rock tripe - Umbilicaria
- Rosette lichen - Physcia
- Ruffle lichen - Parmotrema

== S ==
- Scatter-rug lichen - Parmotrema
- Scribble lichen - Opegrapha
- Script lichen - Graphis
- Seaweed lichen - Lichina
- Shell lichen - Arthopyrenia
- Shield lichen - Heterodermia, Parmelia
- Silverskin lichen - Dermatocarpon
- Skin lichen - Leptogium
- Snow lichen - Stereocaulon
- Socket lichen - Solorina
- Soot lichen - Cyphelium
- Spike lichen - Calicium
- Spotted felt lichen - Sticta
- Stippleback lichen - Dermatocarpon
- Stipplescale lichen - Placidium
- Strap lichen - Ramalina
- Stubble lichen - Calicium
- Sulphur lichen - Fulgensia
- Sunburst lichen - Xanthomendoza, Xanthoria
- Sunken disk lichen - Aspicilia

== T ==
- Thread lichen - Ephebe
- Tile lichen - Lecidea
- Tube lichen - Hypogymnia

== U ==
- Urn lichen - Tholurna

== V ==
- Velvet lichen - Cystocoleus

== W ==
- Wart lichen - Porina, Pyrenula, Staurothele, Verrucaria Pertusaria
- Whitefingers lichen - Siphula
- Whiteworm lichen - Thamnolia
- Witch's hair lichen - Alectoria
- Wolf lichen - Letharia
- Wreath lichen - Phaeophyscia
