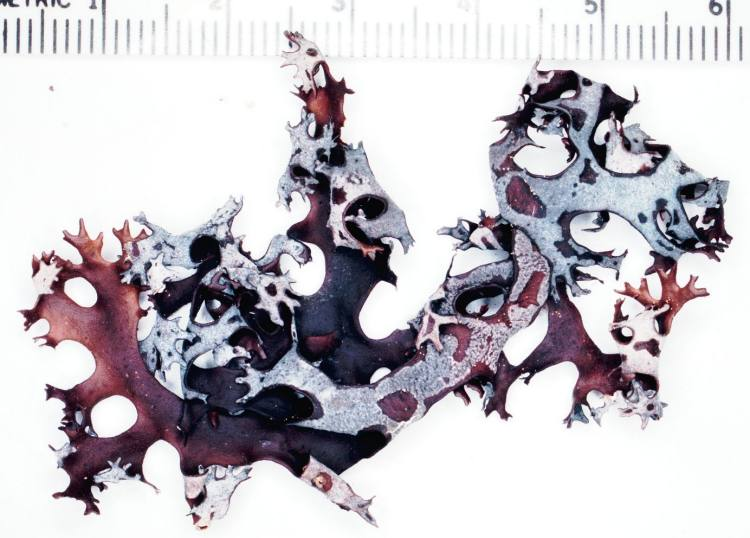
- Masonhalea richardsonii

Scientific classification
- Domain: Eukaryota
- Kingdom: Fungi
- Division: Ascomycota
- Class: Lecanoromycetes
- Order: Lecanorales
- Family: Parmeliaceae
- Genus: Masonhalea; Kärnefelt (1977)

Type species
- Masonhalea richardsonii (Hook.) Kärnefelt (1977)

Species
- M. inermis M. richardsonii

= Masonhalea =

Genus of fungi

Masonhalea is a genus of two species of lichenized fungi in the family Parmeliaceae.

== Taxonomy ==
The genus was circumscribed by Swedish lichenologist Ingvar Kärnefelt in 1977, with Masonhalea richardsonii as the type, and at that time, only species. The genus name honours American lichenologist Mason Hale. The unusual morphology of this species – a vagrant lichen – attracted interest from several lichenologists, resulting in its placement in several genera, including Cornicularia, Evernia, Everniopsis, Platysma and Parmelia. Masonhalea inermis (formerly Cetraria crispa f. inermis) was added to the genus in 2011; a close genetic relationship between these two species was confirmed with molecular phylogenetics.

In 2017, Divakar and colleagues used a recently developed "temporal phylogenetic" approach to identify temporal bands for specific taxonomic ranks in the family Parmeliaceae, suggesting that groups of species that diverged within the time window of 29.45–32.55 million years ago represent genera. They proposed to synonymize Masonhalea with Nephromopsis, along with several other Parmelioid genera, so that all the genera within the Parmeliaceae are about the same age. Although some of their proposed taxonomic changes were accepted, the synonymization of the Parmelioid genera with Nephromopsis was not accepted in a recent analysis.

== Description ==
Both Masonhalea species feature lateral apothecia, pycnidia on the thallus margin, a layer of cortical tissue beneath the wall of the pycnidia, and bacillariform (short cylindrical) conidia.

== Species ==
- Masonhalea inermis (Nyl.) Lumbsch, Nelsen & A.Thell (2011)
- Masonhalea richardsonii (Hook.) Kärnefelt (1977)
