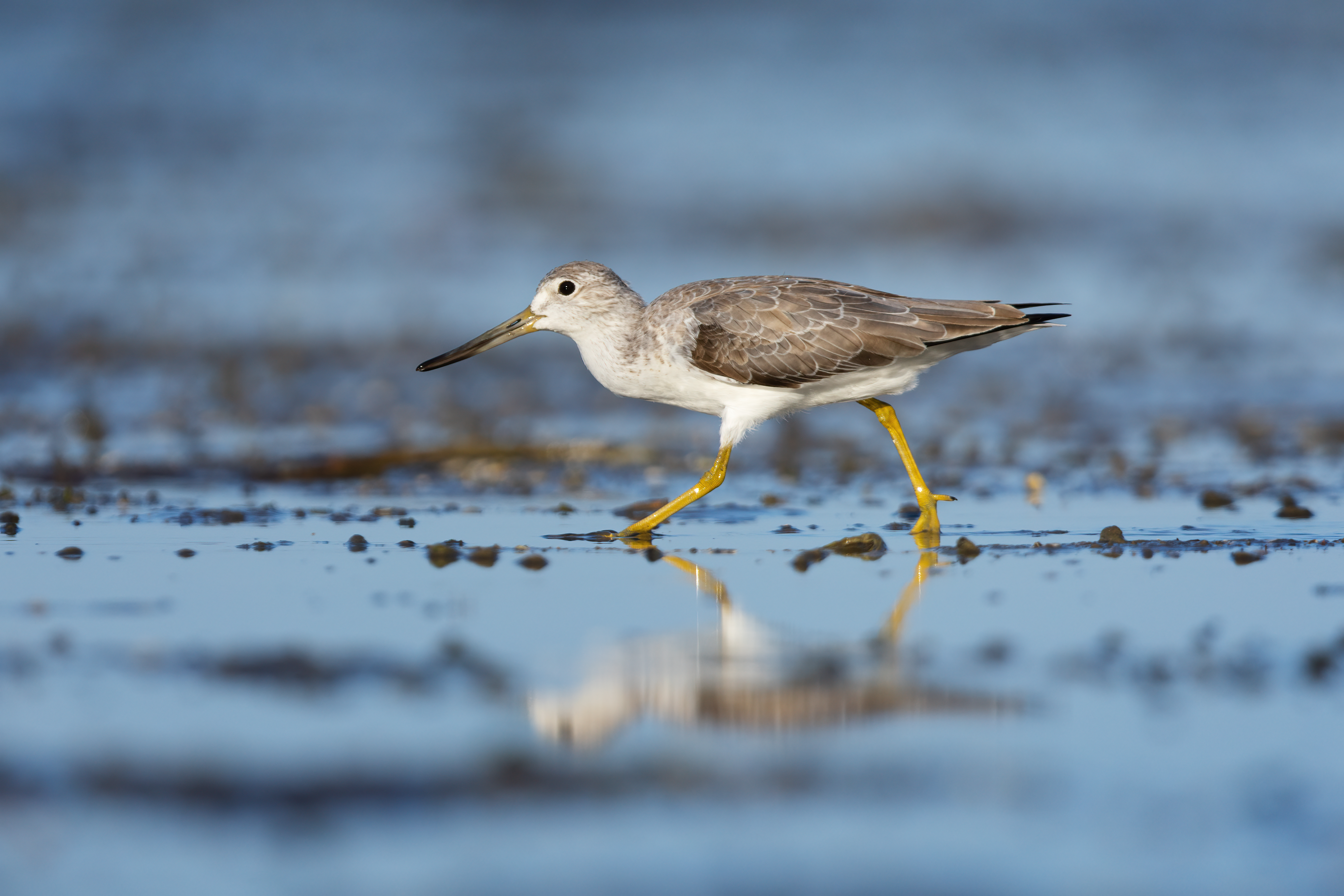
- Non-breeding plumage

Conservation status
- Endangered (IUCN 3.1)
- CITES Appendix I

Scientific classification
- Kingdom: Animalia
- Phylum: Chordata
- Class: Aves
- Order: Charadriiformes
- Family: Scolopacidae
- Genus: Tringa
- Species: T. guttifer

Binomial name
- Tringa guttifer (Nordmann, 1835)

Synonyms
- Pseudototanus guttifer

= Nordmann's greenshank =

Species of bird

Nordmann's greenshank (Tringa guttifer) or the spotted greenshank is a wader in the large family Scolopacidae, the typical waders. They are considered endangered by the International Union for Conservation of Nature (IUCN) Red List and are typically found within the East Asian-Australasian Flyway.

== Description ==
Nordmann's greenshank is a medium-sized sandpiper, at 29–32 cm (11–13 in) long, with a slightly upturned, bicoloured bill, and relatively short yellow legs. Breeding adults have darker plumage than their non-breeding counterparts. These adults often appear boldly marked, with dark brown spangling on their back, chest, and head and a white underbelly.They have a heavily streaked head and upper neck; broad, blackish, crescentic spots on lower neck and breast; and darker lores. Breeding adult bills are darker and less obviously bicolored as well. Non-breeding adults have a lighter brown to gray plumage along their back and minimal spotting along their neck and chest. Their bills are light nearest the head and dark as it extends to the tip. Chicks are light brown with mottled black and dark brown stripes across their back and head. Similar to the North American Blue jay, the Nordmann's greenshank eggs are a pale blue-green with darker gray to brown speckling that condenses near the widest end of the egg.

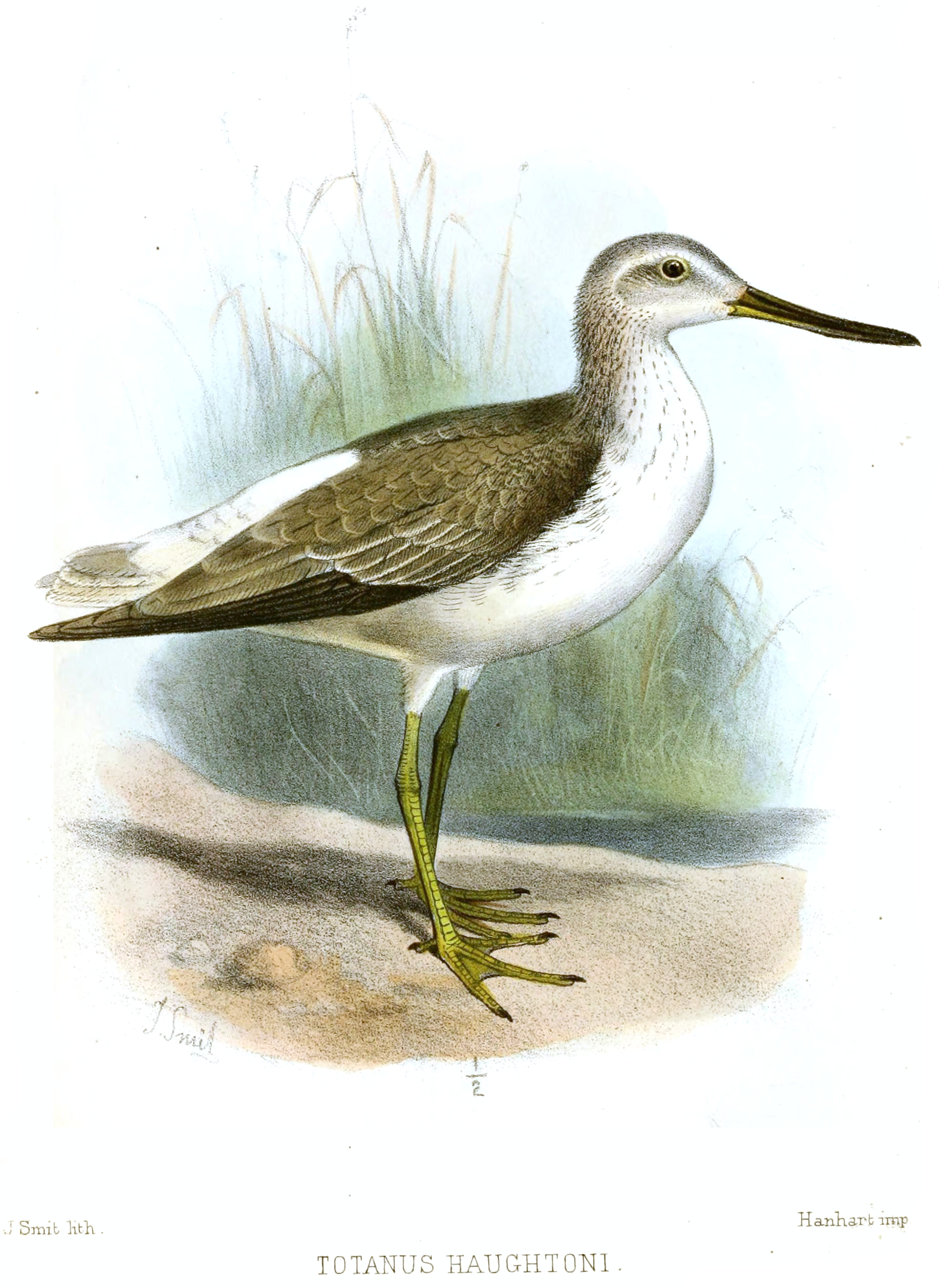

== Distribution ==
Nordmann's greenshank is found primarily within the East Asian-Australasian Flyway and as of 2023, the wild population ranges from 1500 to 2000 individuals. Breeding populations are found in eastern Russia along the south-western and northern coasts of the Sea of Okhotsk and on Sakhalin Island. Their non-breeding range is not fully defined, but significant numbers have been recorded in South Korea, mainland China, Hong Kong, Taiwan during the migratory season. During winter, these birds can be found in Bangladesh, Thailand, Cambodia, Vietnam and Peninsular Malaysia. They have also been recorded on passage or during winter in Japan, North Korea, India, Sri Lanka, Myanmar, Singapore, the Philippines and Indonesia. There are unconfirmed records from Nepal and Guam (to the U.S.).. They have been recorded several times on Eighty Mile Beach in Western Australia. Recently, an individual was discovered on Cairns Esplanade in Queensland, Australia. This individual was known to have over-wintered there from December 2020 to May 2021. In mid-December 2021 what is thought to be the same individual bird, returned to Cairns Esplanade. It has now returned for four straight seasons, being regularly seen in 2022 and 2023.

== Nesting ==
Nordmann's Greenshank has been shown to have a nesting preference towards partially dried boglands containing stands of larch trees. Their nests are found in three primary locations among these habitats: 1) arboreal nests on larch branches, 2) ground nests at the base of sapling larch trees, and 3) ground nests at the base of mature larch trees. Nests are constructed with small twigs from these larches and lined with lichens and other soft foliage. Such composition includes dwarf Siberian pine (Pinus pumila) needles, speckled horsehair (Bryoria fuscescens), melanelia (Melanohalea olivacea), rim (Lecanora symmicta), ring (Evernia mesomorpha), tube (Hypogymnia sachalinensis), Bering reindeer (Cladonia cf. arbuscula), and bearded (Usnea sp.). Ring, tube, and Bering reindeer lichens are light in color, behaviorally used to camouflage their eggs. Clutches typically contain 3-4 eggs.

== Molting Patterns ==
Molting season for the Nordmann's greenshank occurs in late summer and early fall during the months of July through October. Molting occurs during their migration south during the non-breeding season. Molting behavior lasts on average 65 days and the birds typically halt migration while molting.

== Roosting Behavior ==
During the non-breeding season in the Inner Gulf of Thailand, the Nordmann's greenshank has been shown to have roost preferences determined by tide cycles. Birds will choose artificial roosting areas such as saltpans and aquaculture farms during oceanic high tides, but tend to prefer mudflats along the coastline. Roost sites are chosen based on the characteristics: 1) depth of water in selected sites, 2) travel distance for foraging sites, 3) human disturbance risk, and 4) competition with other shorebirds.

== Taxonomy ==
Before being classified as the genus Tringa, the Nordmann's greenshank was formerly placed in the monotypic genus Pseudototanus. A full mitochondrial DNA reference genome was published in 2019. This DNA places these birds firmly within the Tringa genus, with the closest phylogenetic relative being the willet (Tringa semipalmata).

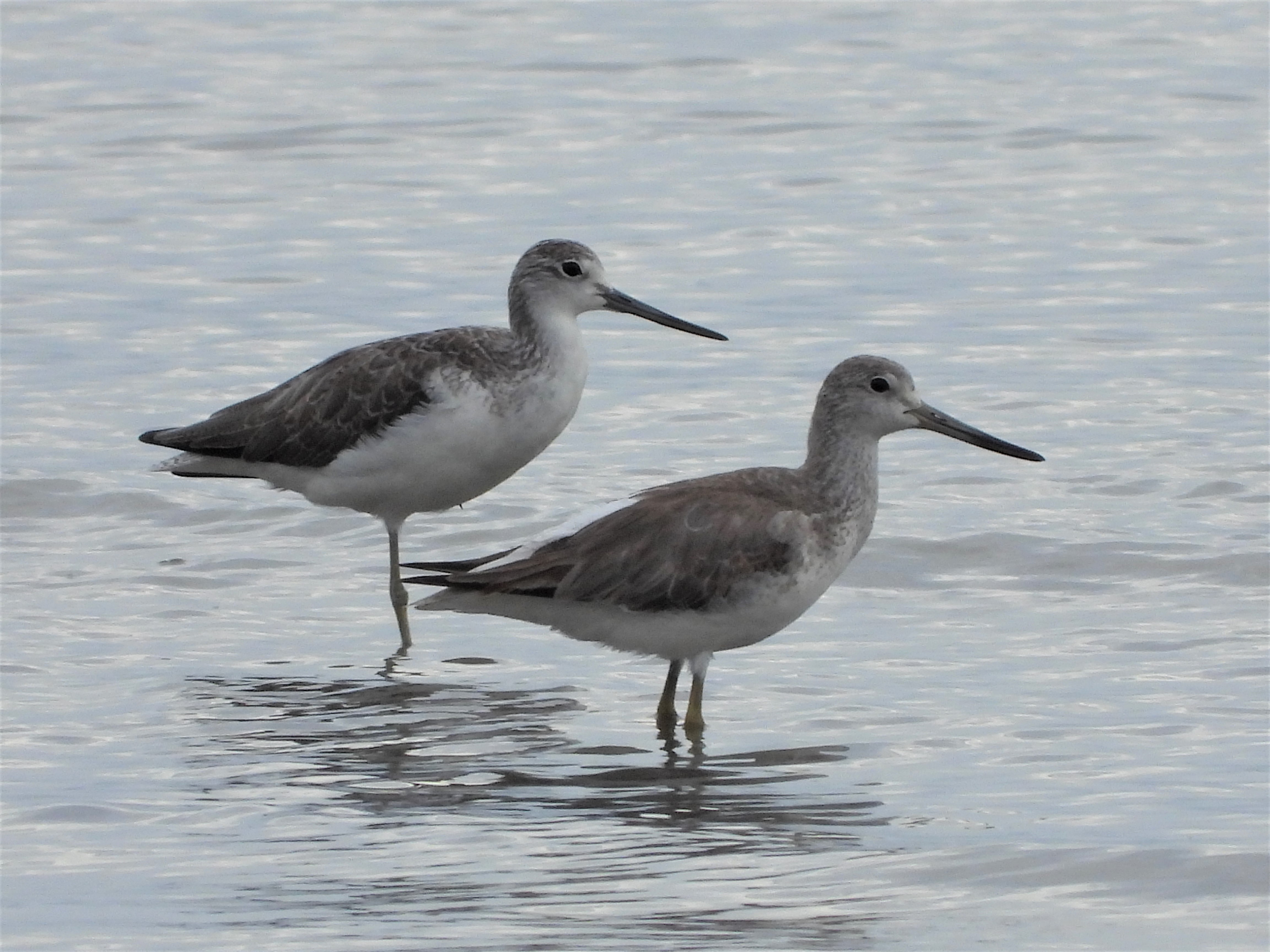
Common greenshank and Nordmann's greenshank, Cairns, Australia

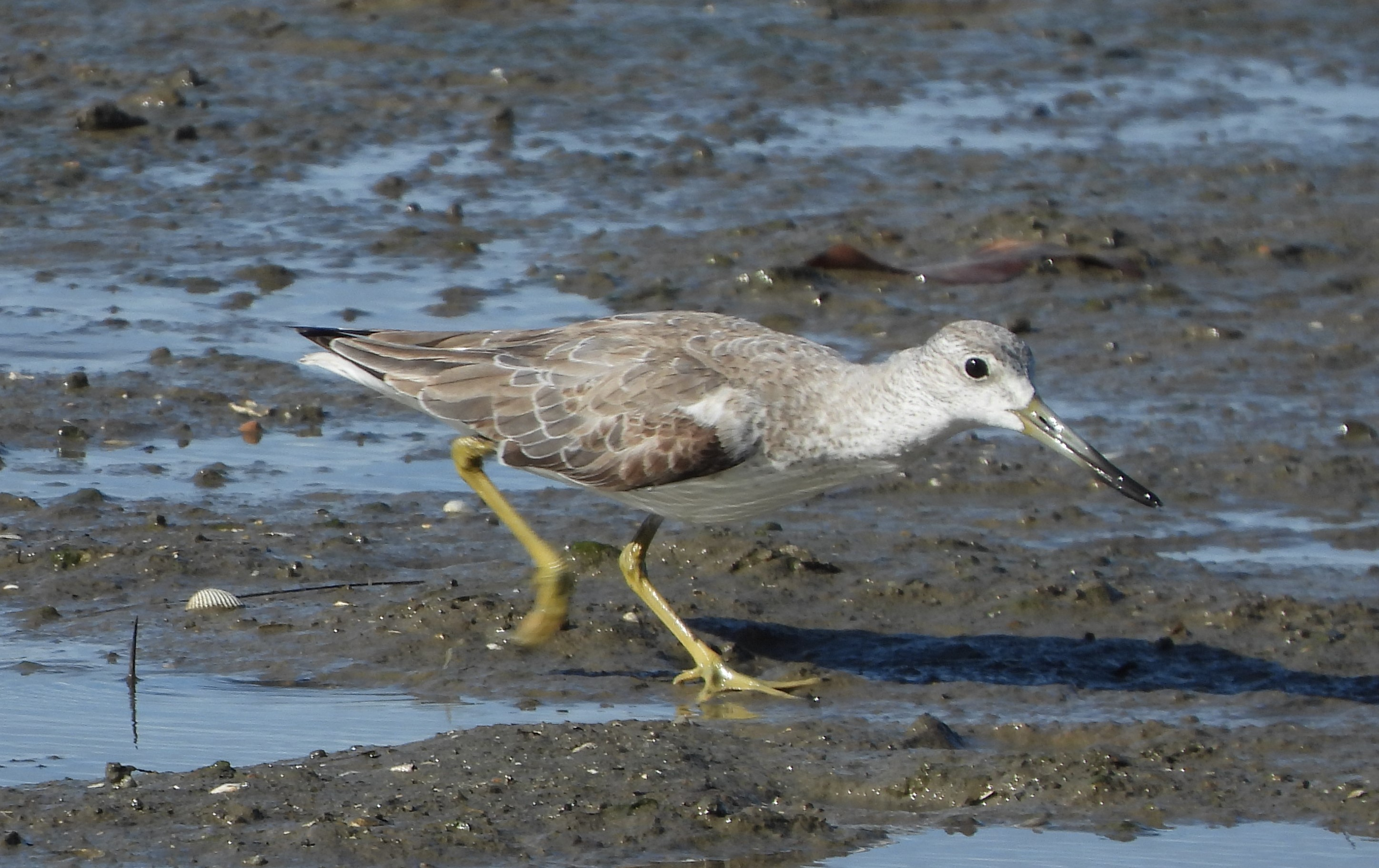
Nordmann's greenshank, Cairns, Australia

== Conservation ==
Tringa guttifer was placed on the IUCN Red List in 1988 as a "Threatened" species, and was moved to the "Endangered" category in 1994. This classification remains into 2026.

Currently, there is no official conservation strategy being used for this species. The primary threats to T. guttifer are habitat loss, disturbance, and illegal netting by humans.
