= Evernia illyrica =

Scientific classification
- Domain: Eukaryota
- Kingdom: Fungi
- Division: Ascomycota
- Class: Lecanoromycetes
- Order: Lecanorales
- Family: Parmeliaceae
- Genus: Evernia
- Species: E. illyrica

Binomial name
- Evernia illyrica (Zahlbr.) Du Rietz (1926)

Synonyms
- Evernia divaricata subsp. illyrica Zahlbr. (1904)

Species of lichen

Evernia illyrica is a rare species of fruticose lichen in the family Parmeliaceae. It is native to Europe and North Africa. It grows in a hanging manner, reaching lengths of up to 30 cm, and attaches to its base by a single point. The lichen's main body (thallus) is uniformly grey to whitish-grey with no distinct upper or lower surfaces, featuring rich but irregular branching patterns with branches that grow parallel to each other. Though reproductive structures (apothecia) are rare, when present they appear as disc-like formations up to 4 mm across with a brown centre surrounded by a thin rim. The species is extremely rare and endangered in Italy, and has been documented in well-preserved forests across Spain (particularly the Pyrenees), Albania, Turkey, and Morocco, where it typically grows on large trees in undisturbed habitats.

== Taxonomy ==
Evernia illyrica was first formally described as a new species in 1904 by the German lichenologist Alexander Zahlbruckner, who classified it as a subspecies of Evernia divaricata. Gustaf Einar Du Rietz elevated it to species status in 1926.

== Description ==
Evernia illyrica is a fruticose (shrub-like) lichen that attaches to its substrate via a basal holdfast. It grows in a pendulous manner, reaching lengths of up to 30 cm. The thallus (main body of the lichen) is not dorsiventral (having distinct upper and lower surfaces), instead displaying a uniform grey to whitish-grey colouration on all sides with a matt finish. It has rich but irregular branching patterns with mostly obtuse angles at branch junctions (axils). The main branches generally grow parallel to each other, though they may become entangled, and are somewhat terete (nearly cylindrical) to angular in cross-section with a soft texture. These branches typically measure 0.5–1.5 mm (more rarely up to 3.5 mm) in width and feature smooth surfaces or shallow longitudinal grooves. Scattered side branches appear throughout, with tips that sometimes darken and taper to a point (subulate) or abruptly narrow (acuminate).

The cortex (outer protective layer) of E. illyrica is thin and composed of anticlinally arranged (perpendicular to the surface), small-celled fungal filaments (hyphae). This cortex often degenerates in certain areas and frequently develops transverse cracks in older specimens, exposing the underlying medulla. The medulla (inner layer) is loosely structured, somewhat spider web-like (arachnoid) in appearance, but often forms a very soft central strand that provides cohesion.

Reproductive structures (apothecia) are rare in this species. When present, they are lecanorine in form (disc-like with a rim derived from the thallus), sessile (attached directly to the thallus without a stalk), and positioned laterally on the main branches. These apothecia measure up to 4 mm across, featuring a brown, flat disc surrounded by a thin thalline margin. The internal structure includes a colourless proper exciple (inner rim), a brownish epithecium (upper layer), and a colourless hymenium (spore-producing layer). The paraphyses (sterile filaments among reproductive cells) are mostly simple, thick, and septate (divided by cross-walls), while the hypothecium (layer beneath the hymenium) is colourless.

The asci (spore-producing structures) contain eight spores each and are clavate (club-shaped). Their tholus (apical thickening) turns blue when treated with potassium iodide (K/I+) and is penetrated by a faintly amyloid apical cushion with parallel or diverging flanks. The wall is K/I− but is surrounded by a K/I+ blue outer layer, characteristic of the Lecanora-type. The ascospores are single-celled, hyaline (colourless and transparent), ellipsoidal, measuring approximately 7 by 4 μm, and are often poorly developed. The pycnidia (asexual reproductive structures) appear terminally on short side branches. The photobiont (algal partner) is chlorococcoid. When subjected to chemical spot tests, the cortex is K+ (bright yellow), C−, KC−, and P−. Chemical analysis reveals the presence of atranorin in the cortex and divaricatic acid in the medulla.

== Habitat and distribution ==
Evernia illyrica has been documented in several locations across Europe and North Africa. It is listed on the Italian Regional Red List as extremely rare and endangered and has been recorded in an old-growth forest in northern Spain. In the Pyrenees specifically, it has only been observed growing on large trees in well-preserved forests. The species has also been found in Albania, Turkey, and Morocco.
