= Pilophorus fruticosus =

Scientific classification
- Kingdom: Fungi
- Division: Ascomycota
- Class: Lecanoromycetes
- Order: Lecanorales
- Family: Cladoniaceae
- Genus: Pilophorus
- Species: P. fruticosus

Binomial name
- Pilophorus fruticosus Li S.Wang & Xin Y.Wang (2011)

Species of lichen

Pilophorus fruticosus is a little-known species of rock-dwelling fruticose lichen in the family Cladoniaceae. It was described in 2011 by Chinese scientists from specimens collected in Yunnan Province, southwestern China. The lichen forms a small greyish crust on rock surfaces from which arise branching, shrub-like stalks that repeatedly fork and end in single black, spherical fruiting bodies. It is known only from two closely spaced locations in the Cang Mountain range, where it grows on exposed ridges at around 3,500 metres elevation among open conifer-rhododendron woodland.

== Taxonomy ==
Pilophorus fruticosus was described in 2011 by Xin-Yu Wang, Li-Song Wang and co-workers after material collected in 2006 on Cang Mountain in Yunnan Province, south-western China, was shown to represent an undescribed species rather than the superficially similar P. robustus. The new species was diagnosed by its densely and evenly dichotomous pseudopodetia, each branch terminating in a single, spherical black apothecium (fruiting body), together with partly cortex-lacking stalks that reveal a dark pigmented medulla.

Comparative morphology separates it from P. robustus, which has stouter, umbellately branched stalks, a well-developed internal columella and lacks the dark boundary layer that marks the junction between sterile and fertile tissues in P. fruticosus. Occasional forked branches in P. acicularis and P. awasthianus may cause confusion, but those species differ in taller or aggregated stalks, larger spores and the absence of the distinguishing boundary texture.

== Description ==
The lichen forms a persistent primary thallus that is tightly appressed to siliceous rock, composed of minute grey-to-whitish granules (roughly 0.1–0.2 mm) which often coalesce into small squamules about 1 mm across. From this crust arise fruticose pseudopodetia 0.5–1 cm tall and less than 1 mm wide; they branch dichotomously from base to apex and are clothed in granules the same colour as the primary thallus. Parts of the cortex flake away, exposing a brown to dark-brown inner layer and a solid, gelatinised core of pigmented hyphae.

Green algae make up the main photobiont, while brown, warted cephalodia (1–2 mm) containing Nostoc cyanobacteria are frequent on the primary crust and occasionally on the lower stalks. Each mature branch tip bears a solitary spherical apothecium about 1 mm in diameter; internally the epihymenium is bluish-green and about 5 μm tall, the hymenium is clear, 80–100 μm high, and a pigmented boundary layer surrounds the fertile tissue, but no columella is present. Eight spindle-shaped ascospores (18–22.5 × 5–7.5 μm) are produced per ascus. Pycnidia occur in small clusters at the tips of the stalk and release sickle-shaped conidia (4–5 × 1 μm).

Spot tests on the thallus give K+ (yellow), C− and P− reactions; thin-layer chromatography detects atranorin and zeorin as the only secondary metabolites.

== Habitat and distribution ==
Pilophorus fruticosus is an alpine species restricted to siliceous rocks in the Cang Mountain range of Yunnan. It grows among other lichens such as Cladonia and Stereocaulon on exposed ridges at around 3,500 m elevation, within open conifer–rhododendron woodland dominated by Abies georgei. It is known from only two closely spaced localities in Dali County. It is (as of 2011) one of six species of Pilophorus that have been documented from China.
