= Placynthium glaciale =

Scientific classification
- Kingdom: Fungi
- Division: Ascomycota
- Class: Lecanoromycetes
- Order: Peltigerales
- Family: Placynthiaceae
- Genus: Placynthium
- Species: P. glaciale

Binomial name
- Placynthium glaciale Fryday & T.Sprib. (2020)

Species of lichen

Placynthium glaciale is a species of saxicolous (rock-dwelling) crustose lichen in the family Placynthiaceae. It is found in various locations in Alaska. Identification of this species rests on the distinctive mosaic of tiny lobes, the persistent glossy black apothecial margin, and the unusually blocky, multi-partitioned ascospores.

== Taxonomy ==
The species was described as new to science in 2020 by the lichenologists Alan Fryday and Toby Spribille. The type specimen was collected in the Hoonah–Angoon Census Area of Glacier Bay National Park and Preserve, on the upper end of Muir Inlet. Here the lichen was found growing on an argillite-like boulder as well as exposed cobbles in post-glacial soil. The specific epithet glaciale alludes to its association with glacial forelands.

== Description ==
Placynthium glaciale forms a thin, crust-like thallus that clings tightly to its substrate and breaks along fine cracks (rimose). A single patch is rarely wider than about 3.5 cm and averages 0.2 mm thick. The surface is olive-brown and densely studded with minute, cactus-like lobes—technically described as opuntioid or dactyloid—that are only 30–150 micrometers (μm) across. Each lobe rises from the crust as a tiny round or finger-shaped projection, giving the lichen a roughened texture under a hand lens. In vertical section the outer skin (cortex) is a continuous mosaic (paraplectenchyma) of rounded cells 4–6 μm wide. A bluish marginal growth zone (hypothallus) may be present; it turns mauve in potassium hydroxide solution (KOH) but does not extend beyond the thallus edge. The photosynthetic partner is an unidentified cyanobacterium whose 6–7 μm cells sometimes link into short chains and can be easily dislodged when the thallus is sectioned.

The spore-bearing bodies (apothecia) are scattered over the surface as round disks 0.3–0.8 mm in diameter. Their centers are dark brown to jet black, flat to slightly sunken, and entirely dull. A shiny black rim persists as the apothecia age and may curve inward enough to shade part of the disc. Microscopic sections show a wall (excipulum) about 50 μm thick at the sides and up to 90 μm at the base; its inner layers are purplish, grading to blue-black toward the edge, and consist of radiating fungal threads whose end cells can reach 10 μm wide. The spore layer (hymenium) is 65–90 μm tall and carries streaks of deep blue-black pigment that intensify toward the top; it stains blue in iodine before any alkali treatment. Supporting filaments (paraphyses) are 1.8–2.0 μm thick in mid-section, branch sparingly, and swell to about 3 μm in potassium hydroxide. Below them lies a two-part base (hypothecium): a clear to pale-brown subhymenium 50–60 μm thick and, beneath that, a loose tangle of slightly pigmented hyphae extending to a total depth of around 230 μm and turning blue after alkali-iodine treatment. Club-shaped asci measure 53–60 × 11–16 μm but typically mature only five to seven spores instead of the usual eight. The ascospores, which develop from simple to somewhat muriform (divided by both a lengthwise and one or more cross walls), are often nearly square in outline, averaging 8.4–10.8 × 6.4–7.1 μm.

No asexual reproductive structures have been observed, and standard spot tests yield no color reactions; thin-layer chromatography likewise fails to detect secondary metabolites.

== Habitat and distribution ==
Placynthium glaciale is only known to occur in Alaska, where it has been documented from Glacier Bay National Park, Petersburg Borough, Patterson Glacier, and Muir Glacier. It is one of ten Placynthium species that is found in Alaska.
