= Pilophorus =

Pilophorus may refer to:

- Pilophorus (bug)
- Pilophorus (fungus)
