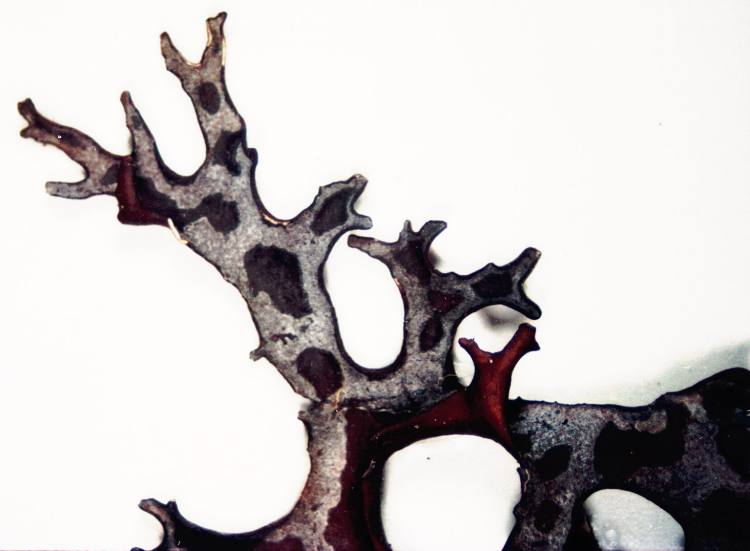
- Characteristic netted pattern of M. richardsonii

Conservation status
- Secure (NatureServe)

Scientific classification
- Kingdom: Fungi
- Division: Ascomycota
- Class: Lecanoromycetes
- Order: Lecanorales
- Family: Parmeliaceae
- Genus: Masonhalea
- Species: M. richardsonii

Binomial name
- Masonhalea richardsonii (Hook.) Kärnefelt, 1977

= Masonhalea richardsonii =

Species of fruticose lichen

Masonhalea richardsonii, known as Richardson's masonhalea lichen or the arctic tumbleweed, is a fruticose lichen found mainly in Northern ecosystems. It is known as the arctic tumbleweed because when dry, it curls up and is spread by wind across the open tundra. It has a unique brown colouration with white netting patterns.
