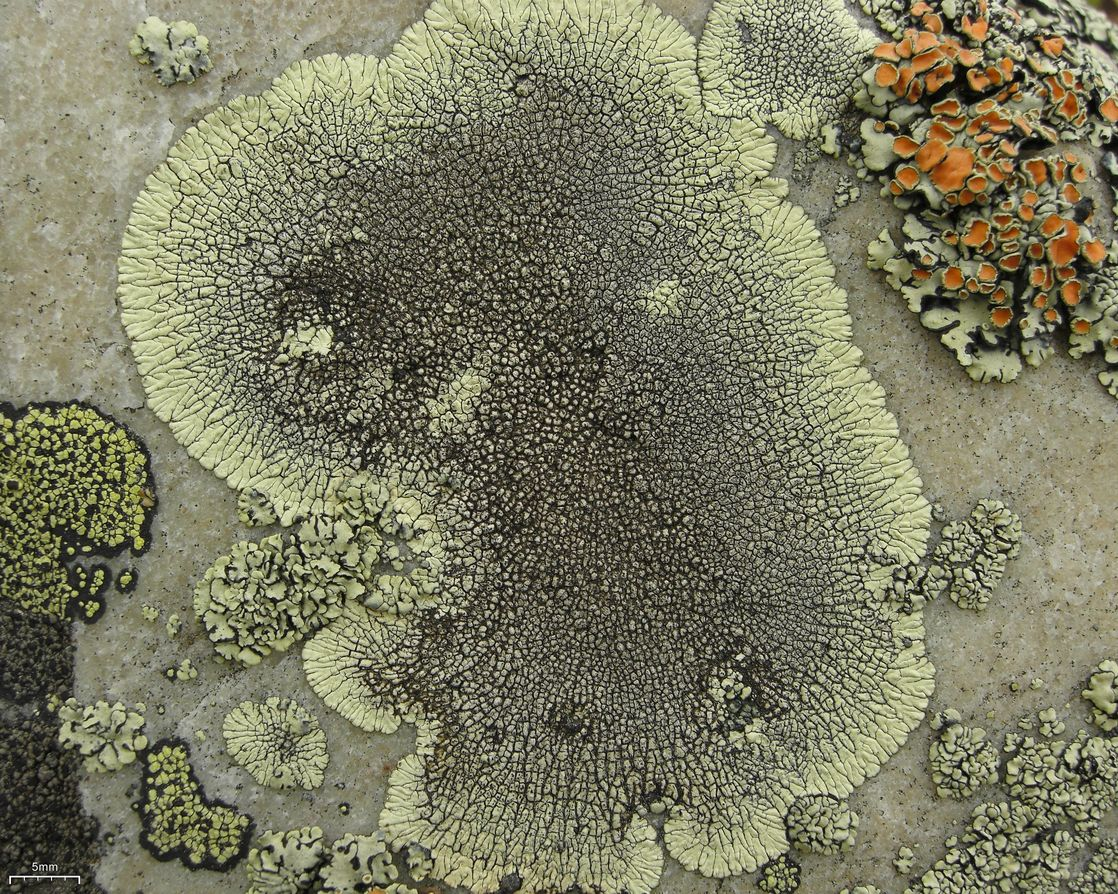
- Dimelaena oreina

Scientific classification
- Domain: Eukaryota
- Kingdom: Fungi
- Division: Ascomycota
- Class: Lecanoromycetes
- Order: Caliciales
- Family: Caliciaceae
- Genus: Dimelaena; Norman (1852)

Type species
- Dimelaena oreina (Ach.) Norman (1853)

Synonyms
- Dimelaena sect. Dimelaena Norman (1852); Beltraminia Trevis. (1857)

= Dimelaena =

Genus of lichens

Dimelaena is a genus of lichenized fungi in the family Caliciaceae. Members of the genus are commonly called mountain lichens, or moonglow lichens. They are placodioid crustose lichens, ranging in form from rimose to areolate. The genus has a widespread distribution and contains eight species.

== Species ==
- Dimelaena australiensis H.Mayrhofer & Sheard (1984)
- Dimelaena elevata Elix, Kalb & Wippel (1996)
- Dimelaena ewersii Elix (2017)
- Dimelaena lichenicola K.Knudsen, Sheard, Kocourk. & H.Mayrhofer (2013)
- Dimelaena mayrhoferiana Aptroot & M.Cáceres (2018)
- Dimelaena oreina (Ach.) Norman (1852)
- Dimelaena radiata (Tuck.) Müll.Arg. (1884
- Dimelaena subsquamulosa Giralt, H.Mayrhofer, van den Boom & Elix (2014)
- Dimelaena tenuis (Müll.Arg.) H.Mayrhofer & Wippel (1996)
- Dimelaena triseptata Aptroot (2008)
