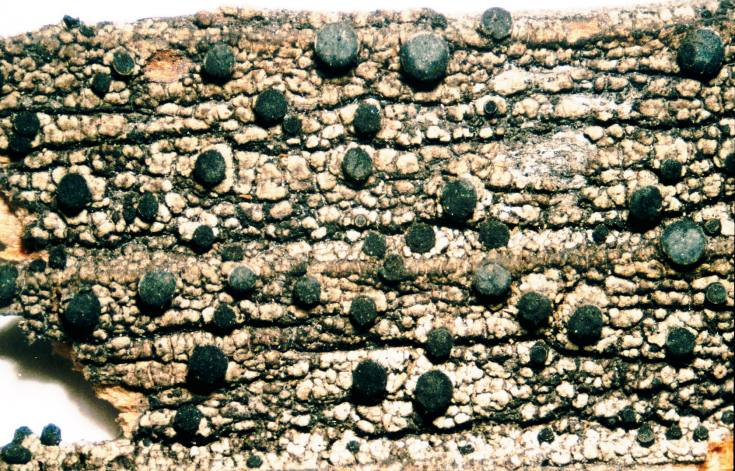
- Cyphelium inquinans

Scientific classification
- Kingdom: Fungi
- Division: Ascomycota
- Class: Lecanoromycetes
- Order: Caliciales
- Family: Caliciaceae
- Genus: Cyphelium; Ach. (1815)

Type species
- Cyphelium tigillare (Ach.) Ach. (1815)

= Cyphelium =

Genus of lichens

Cyphelium is a genus of crustose areolate lichens with cup-like apothecia filled with sooty black spores. The genus is in the family Caliciaceae . The genus has a widespread distribution, especially in north and south temperate regions, and contains about 12 species. Members of the genus are commonly called soot lichens.

== Species ==
- Cyphelium brachysporum
- Cyphelium brunneum
- Cyphelium chloroconium
- Cyphelium inquinans
- Cyphelium karelicum
- Cyphelium lecideinum
- Cyphelium lucidum
- Cyphelium marcianum
- Cyphelium notarisii
- Cyphelium pinicola
- Cyphelium sessile
- Cyphelium tigillare
- Cyphelium trachylioides

== Gallery ==
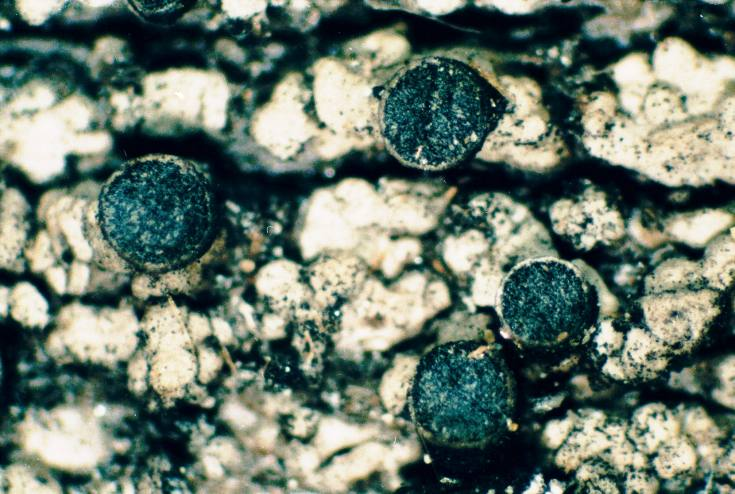
Cyphelium inquinans

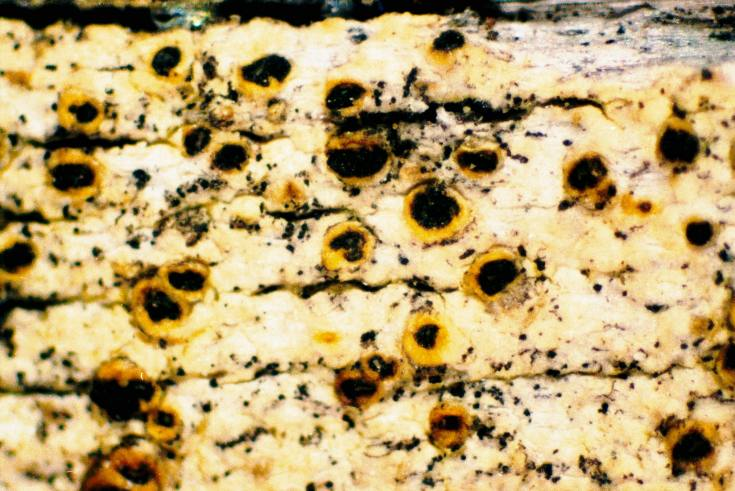
Cyphelium tigillare
