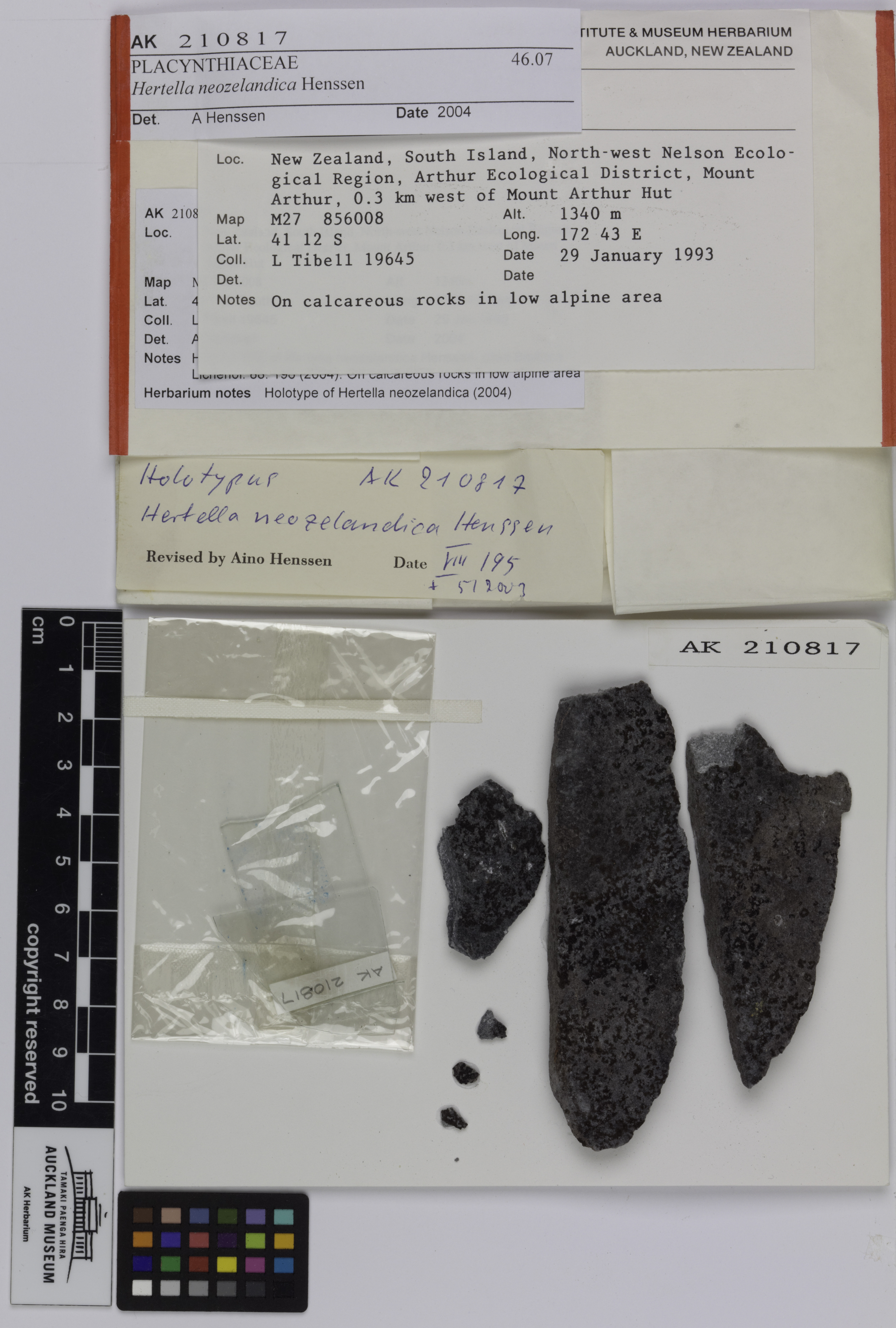

Scientific classification
- Domain: Eukaryota
- Kingdom: Fungi
- Division: Ascomycota
- Class: Lecanoromycetes
- Order: Peltigerales
- Family: Placynthiaceae
- Genus: Hertella; Henssen

Type species
- Hertella subantarctica Henssen

= Hertella =

Genus of fungi

Hertella is a lichenized genus of fungi within the Placynthiaceae family.

The genus name of Hertella is in honour of Hannes Hertel (b.1939), a German botanist (Mycology, Lichenology and Bryology), Taxonomist, Curator of Lichenes/Bryophytes and former Director of the Botanische Staatssammlung München.

The genus was circumscribed by Aino Marjatta Henssen in Mycotaxon vol.22 on page 381 in 1985.

Accepted species by GBIF;

- Hertella chilensis Henssen
- Hertella neozelandica Henssen
- Hertella subantarctica Henssen
