= Sunburst lichen =

Sunburst lichen is the common name of generally orange fioliose lichens that are members of the genus Xanthoparmelia or genus Xanthoria. "Xantho" means "yellow".
