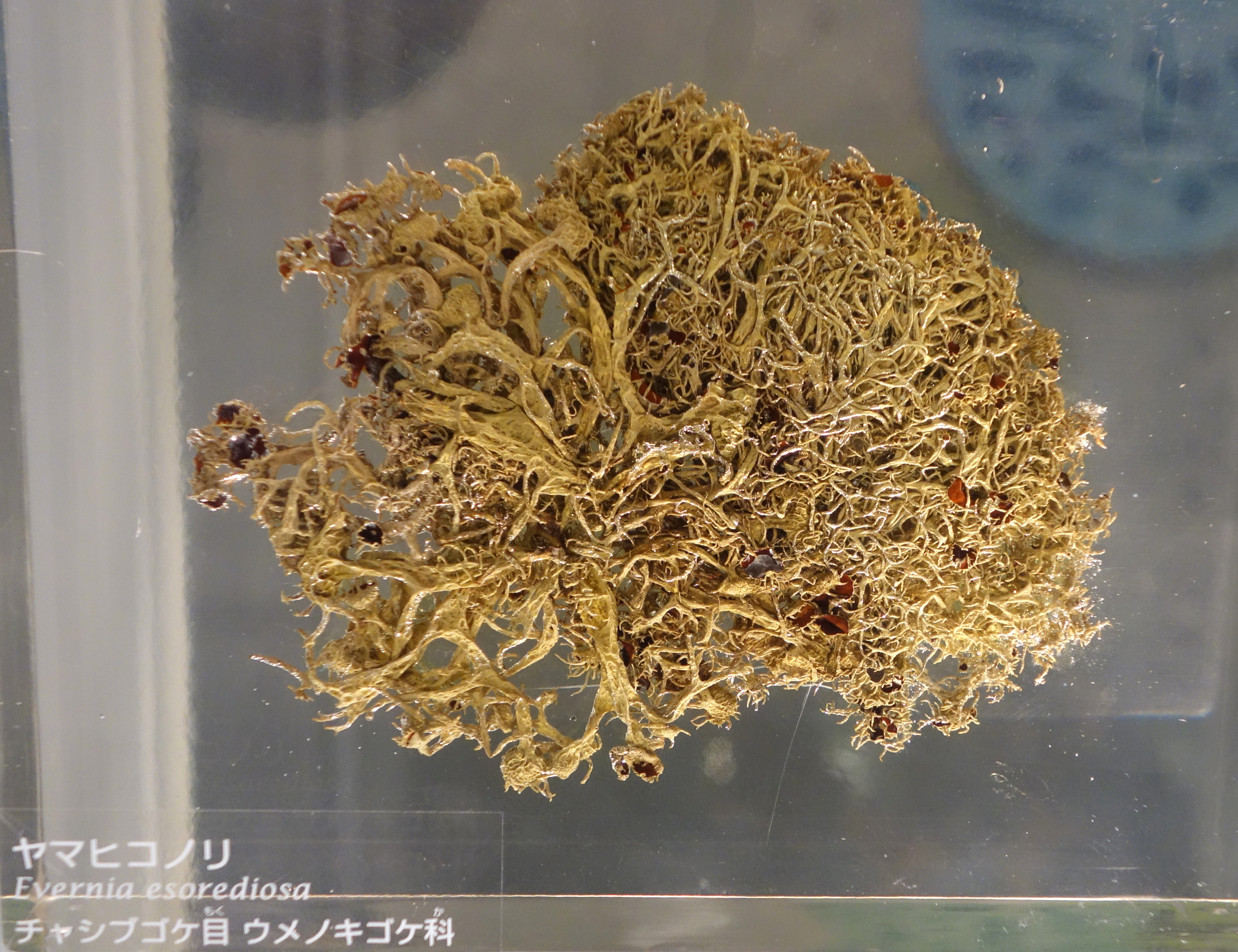
- Exhibit in the National Museum of Nature and Science, Tokyo, Japan

Scientific classification
- Kingdom: Fungi
- Division: Ascomycota
- Class: Lecanoromycetes
- Order: Lecanorales
- Family: Parmeliaceae
- Genus: Evernia
- Species: E. esorediosa

Binomial name
- Evernia esorediosa (Müll.Arg.) Du Rietz

Synonyms
- Evernia mesomorpha f. esorediosa Müll.Arg. (1891)

= Evernia esorediosa =

Species of lichen

Evernia esorediosa is a species of lichen in the family Parmeliaceae. It has no soralia, but many ascocarps.

In a study it has been found that its mycobiont contains hypostrepsilic acid, a dibenzofuran. It made up 3.2% of the dry weight. In its lichenized condition divaricatic acid, an orcinol depside, made up 1.9% of Evernia esorediosa's dry weight. Furthermore it contains usnic acid.

== Distribution ==
Specimens have been found in Japan, Russia, the United States of America, Canada and Mongolia. It is common in larch forests in the cryolithozone.

== Ecology ==
E. esorediosa favours to inhabit conifers. It is an epiphyte of the Dahurian larch. Usnic acid is found in the needles, bark, cambium and roots of Dahurian larchs affected by E. esorediosa. This has an allelopathic effect in the form of slower growth by disturbing the metabolic processes in the needles of the tree.
