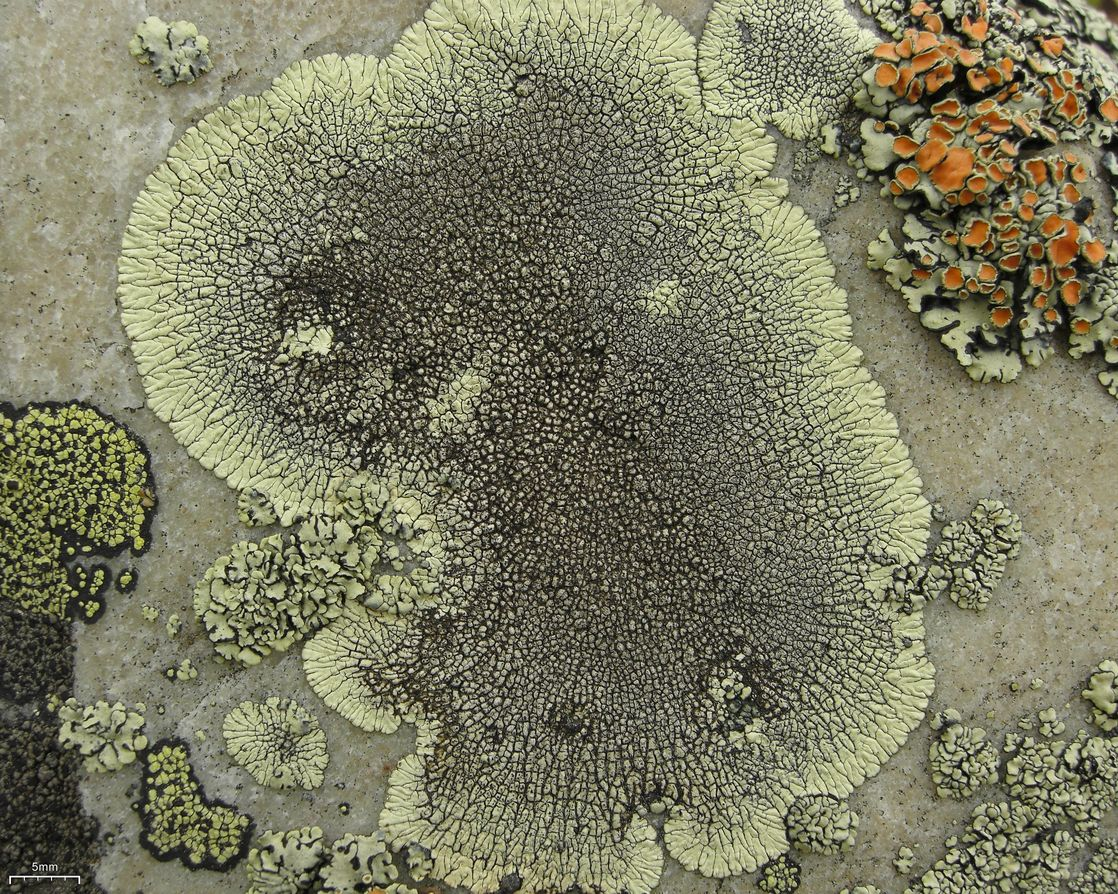

Conservation status
- Secure (NatureServe)

Scientific classification
- Kingdom: Fungi
- Division: Ascomycota
- Class: Lecanoromycetes
- Order: Caliciales
- Family: Caliciaceae
- Genus: Dimelaena
- Species: D. oreina

Binomial name
- Dimelaena oreina (Ach.) Norman (1853)

Synonyms
- Lecanora straminea var. oreina Ach. (1810)

= Dimelaena oreina =

Species of lichen-forming fungus

Dimelaena oreina, the golden moonglow lichen, is a greenish yellow placodioid lichen. The color of the greenish yellow thallus is derived from usnic acid in the cortex.

== Habitat and range ==
The lichen grows on steep surfaces of hard siliceous rock from 400 to 2,800 metres (1,300 to 9,200 ft). It has a worldwide distribution outside the tropics, Australasia, and Antarctica. It is common in the Sonoran Desert of Arizona, California, Baja California, Baja California Sur, Sonora, Mexico, and Chihuahua, Mexico.

In Nepal, Dimelaena oreina has been reported from 3,200 to 4,884 m elevation in a compilation of published records; this reported range extends above the tree line used in the study.
