= Cyphelium notarisii =

Scientific classification
- Domain: Eukaryota
- Kingdom: Fungi
- Division: Ascomycota
- Class: Lecanoromycetes
- Order: Caliciales
- Family: Caliciaceae
- Genus: Cyphelium
- Species: C. notarisii

Binomial name
- Cyphelium notarisii (Tul.) Blomb. & Forssell (1880)

Synonyms
- Acolium notarisii Tul. (1852); Trachylia notarisii (Tul.) Nyl. (1855); Cyphelium tigillare subsp. notarisii (Tul.) W.A.Weber (1967)

Species of lichen

Cyphelium notarisii or soot lichen is a species of lichenised fungus in the family Caliciaceae. Found in Europe and North America, it grows on wood, often in coastal areas. The species was first described as Acolium notarisii by Edmond Tulasne in 1852.
