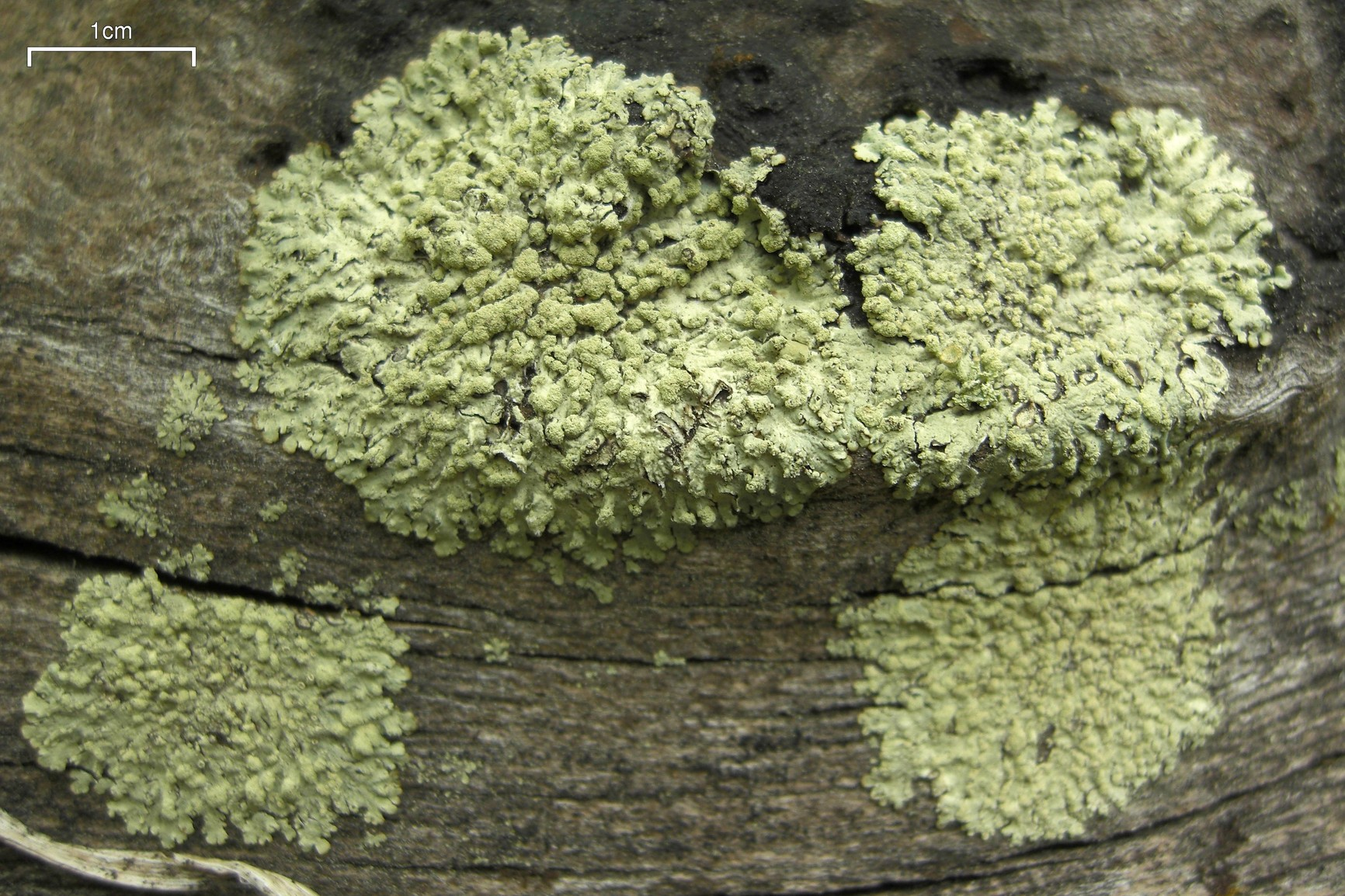
- Parmeliopsis ambigua

Scientific classification
- Domain: Eukaryota
- Kingdom: Fungi
- Division: Ascomycota
- Class: Lecanoromycetes
- Order: Lecanorales
- Family: Parmeliaceae
- Genus: Parmeliopsis (Nyl. ex Stizenb.) Nyl. (1866)

Type species
- Parmeliopsis ambigua (Wulfen) Nyl. (1863)

Species
- P. ambigua P. hyperopta

= Parmeliopsis =

Genus of lichens

Parmeliopsis is a genus of lichens in the family Parmeliaceae. The genus contains two species. Members of this genus are commonly called bran lichens.
