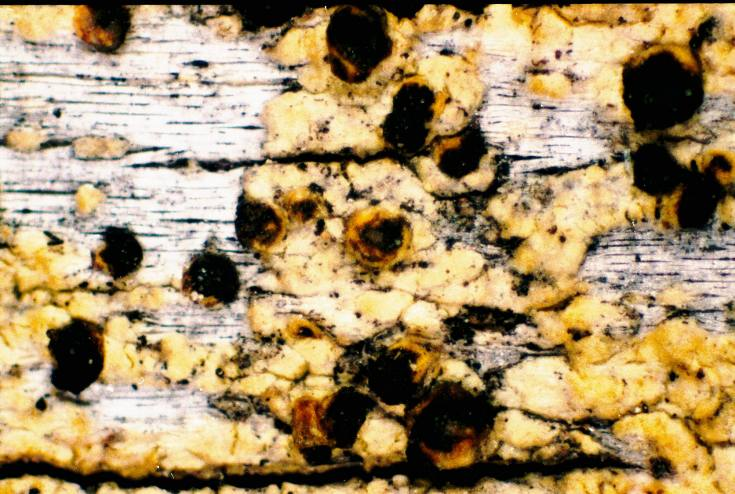

Scientific classification
- Domain: Eukaryota
- Kingdom: Fungi
- Division: Ascomycota
- Class: Lecanoromycetes
- Order: Caliciales
- Family: Caliciaceae
- Genus: Cyphelium
- Species: C. tigillare

Binomial name
- Cyphelium tigillare (Ach.) Ach. (1815)

Synonyms
- Lichen tigillaris Ach. (1798); Calicium tigillare (Ach.) Turner & Borrer; Lecidea tigillaris (Ach.) Ach. (1803); Patellaria tigillaris (Ach.) DC. (1815); Acolium tigillare (Ach.) Gray (1821); Trachylia tigillaris (Ach.) Fr. (1835)

= Cyphelium tigillare =

Species of lichen

Cyphelium tigillare is a species of lignicolous (wood-dwelling) lichen in the family Caliciaceae, and the type species of the genus Cyphelium. Widespread in North America, it commonly grows on fenceposts.
