= Placynthiopsis =

Scientific classification
- Domain: Eukaryota
- Kingdom: Fungi
- Division: Ascomycota
- Class: Lecanoromycetes
- Order: Peltigerales
- Family: Placynthiaceae
- Genus: Placynthiopsis
- Species: P. africana

Binomial name
- Placynthiopsis africana Zahlbr.

Genus of fungi

Placynthiopsis is a genus of lichenized fungi within the Placynthiaceae family. It is monotypic, containing only the species Placynthiopsis africana.
