= Dot lichen =

Dot lichen is a common name for lichens in the genus Arthonia or genus Micarea. "Dotted lichens" are lichens in the genus Bacidia.
