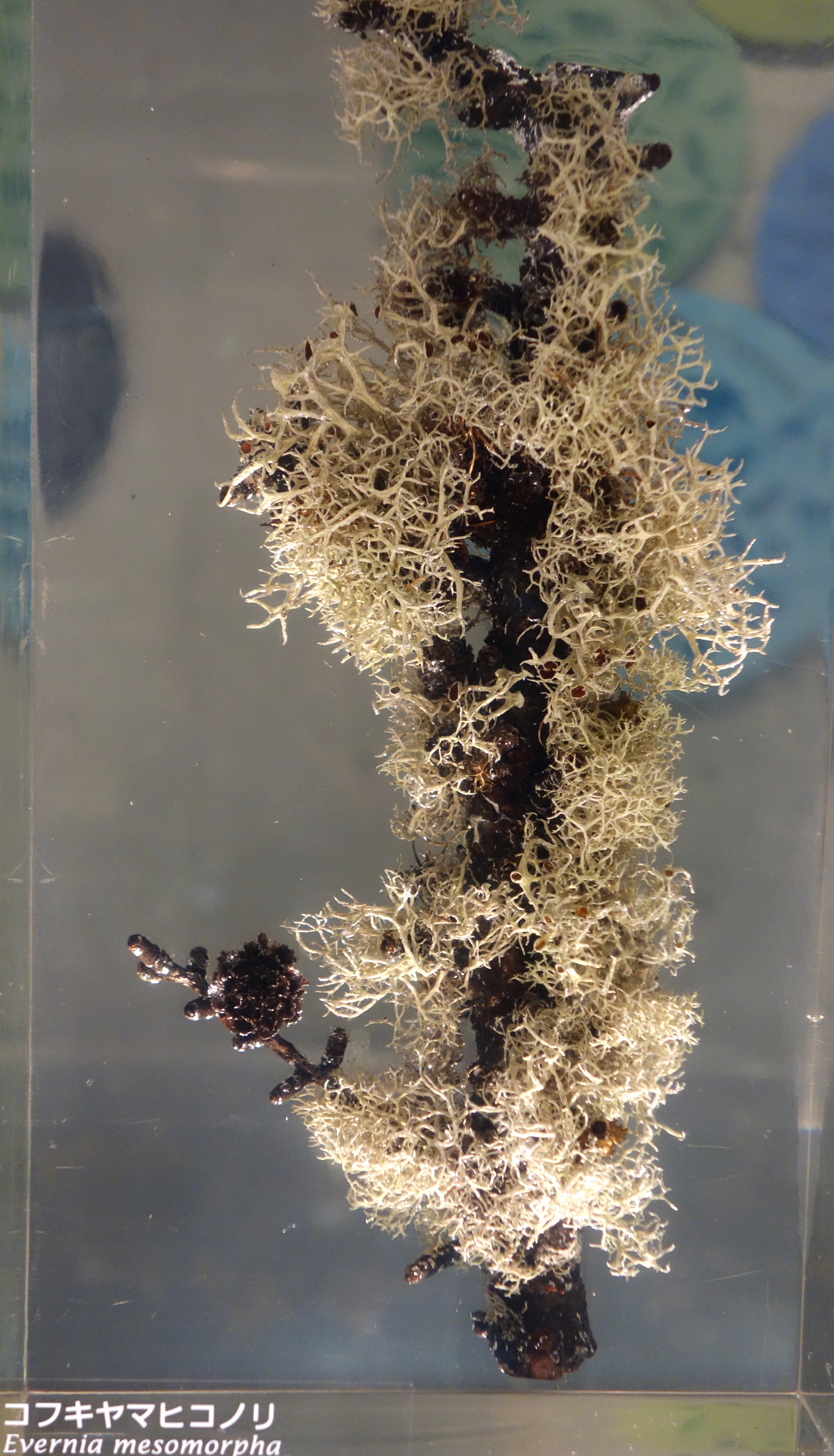

Conservation status
- Secure (NatureServe)

Scientific classification
- Kingdom: Fungi
- Division: Ascomycota
- Class: Lecanoromycetes
- Order: Lecanorales
- Family: Parmeliaceae
- Genus: Evernia
- Species: E. mesomorpha

Binomial name
- Evernia mesomorpha Nyl. (1861)

= Evernia mesomorpha =

Species of lichen

Evernia mesomorpha, commonly known as boreal oakmoss, is a species of fruticose lichen belonging to the family Parmeliaceae. It is characterized by a shrubby, yellow-green thallus with angular branches and coarse soredia on the ridges.

== Habitat and range ==
Evernia mesomorpha grows on the bark of shrubs and trees. It has a cosmopolitan distribution.

== Chemistry ==
Evernia mesomorpha contains usnic acid and divaricatic acid.

== Species interactions ==
Evernia mesomorpha is a host for the lichenicolous fungus Tremella everniae.
