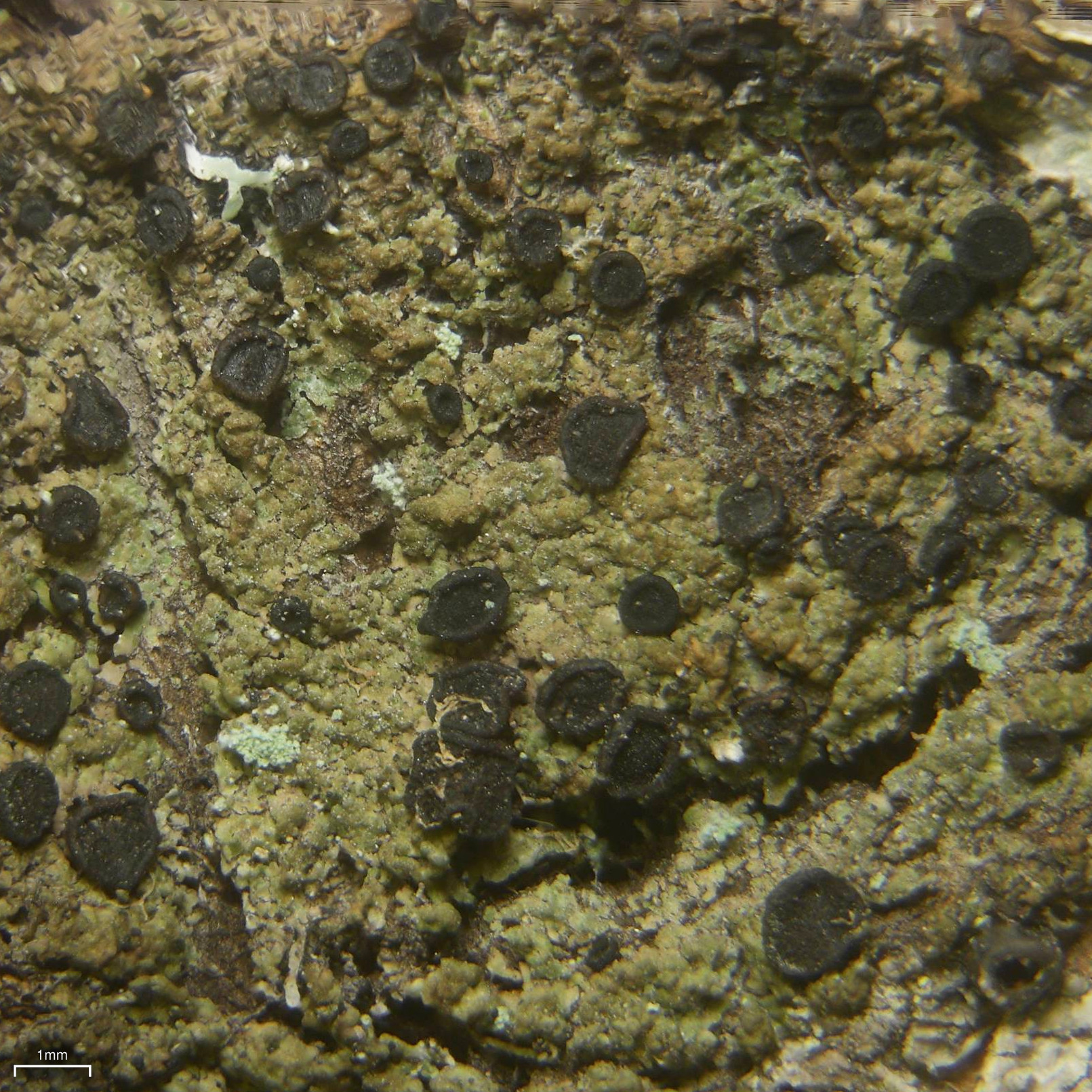
- Lopadium disciforme

Scientific classification
- Domain: Eukaryota
- Kingdom: Fungi
- Division: Ascomycota
- Class: Lecanoromycetes
- Order: Lecideales
- Family: Lopadiaceae; Hafellner (1984)
- Genus: Lopadium; Körb. (1855)

Type species
- Lopadium pezizoideum (Ach.) Körb. (1855)

Species
- see text

= Lopadium (lichen) =

Genus of lichens

Lopadium is a genus of lichen-forming fungi in the monotypic family Lopadiaceae, which is in the order Lecideales. The genus contains 12 species. These lichens form thin, crust-like growths made up of fine granules or tiny scale-like flakes and produce small, stalkless disc-shaped reproductive structures that are distinctly narrowed at the base, giving them a pinched appearance. Distinguished by their unusual spore-producing sacs that contain only a single large ascospore instead of the typical eight, Lopadium species typically colonize decaying plant matter, moss cushions, or bark in cool, humid environments and can be identified microscopically by their unbranched paraphyses with distinctive dark brown swollen tips.

== Taxonomy ==
Lopadium was circumscribed by the German lichenologist Gustav Wilhelm Körber in 1855. He assigned Lopadium pezizoideum as the type species.

The family monotypic Lopadiaceae is classified in the order Lecideales. However, according to Alan Fryday and colleagues in the Revisions of British and Irish Lichens series, "It seems clear that Lopadiaceae does not belong in Lecideales but its true systematic position is unclear."

== Description ==
Lopadium forms a thin, crust-like thallus that spreads across its substrate as a mosaic of fine granules or minute, scale-like flakes. A true protective cortex is absent; instead, the surface is reinforced by a tough, cartilage-like layer. The lichen's algal partner (photobiont) is a green, single-celled alga whose spherical to broadly ellipsoidal cells provide photosynthetic energy for the partnership.

Reproductive bodies (apothecia) are small, stalkless discs that sit directly on the thallus but are distinctly narrowed at the base, giving each fruit body a pinched look. The rim projects beyond the disc, which ranges from shallowly concave to almost flat. Unlike many other lichens, this rim is constructed entirely of fungal tissue rather than incorporating thallus material. Internally, the apothecium is lined by a dark red-brown sheath of densely packed cells (the true exciple). Between the spore-producing sacs are unbranched to sparsely forked threads called paraphyses; their tips swell into cone-shaped caps impregnated with dark brown pigment, a feature that helps separate Lopadium from look-alike genera.

Each ascus (spore sac) contains a single, thick-walled ascospore rather than the more usual eight. These spores are strongly muriform—that is, they are divided by both lengthwise and crosswise walls so the interior resembles a tiny grid of bricks—and are initially colourless but may become slightly yellow-brown with age. Standard chemical spot tests and thin-layer chromatography have so far failed to detect any lichen products. The genus usually colonises decaying plant matter, moss cushions or bark in cool, humid habitats, and can be distinguished from superficially similar genera by its combination of unbranched, cap-tipped paraphyses and the absence of chemical pigments such as parietin in the apothecia.

== Species ==
As of June 2025, Species Fungorum (in the Catalogue of Life) accepts 12 species of Lopadium:

- Lopadium brisbanense (C.Knight) Zahlbr. (1926)
- Lopadium coralloideum (Nyl.) Lynge (1940)
- Lopadium cupuliferum (Nyl.) Zahlbr. (1926)
- Lopadium disciforme (Flot.) Kullh. (1871)
- Lopadium hepaticicola Döbbeler, Poelt & Vězda (1985)
- Lopadium heterosporum (Nyl. ex Hue) Zahlbr. (1926)
- Lopadium lecanorellum A.Massal. (1860)
- Lopadium nigrum (D.D.Awasthi) Kr.P.Singh & G.P.Sinha (2010)
- Lopadium patwardhanii (Chitale & Makhija) Kr.P.Singh & G.P.Sinha (2010)
- Lopadium pezizoideum (Ach.) Körb. (1855)
- Lopadium pulchrum (Müll.Arg.) Zahlbr. (1926)
- Lopadium subcoralloideum Kalb & Aptroot (2017)
