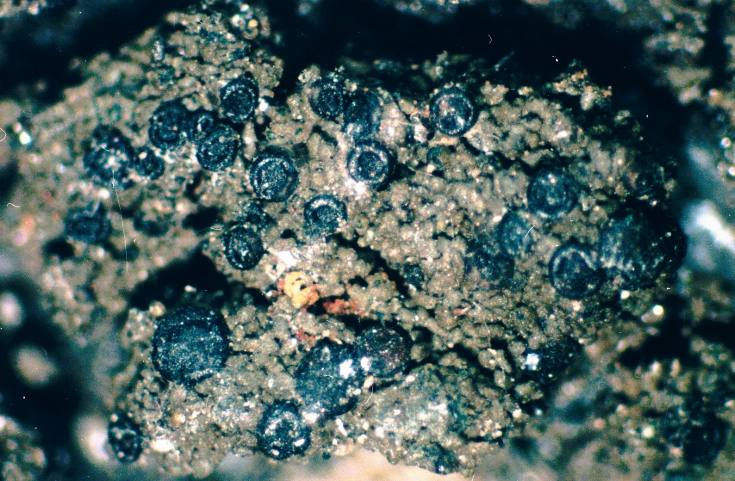
- Herbarium specimen of Placynthium nigrum

Scientific classification
- Kingdom: Fungi
- Division: Ascomycota
- Class: Lecanoromycetes
- Order: Peltigerales
- Family: Placynthiaceae; Å.E.Dahl (1950)

Type genus
- Placynthium (Ach.) Gray

= Placynthiaceae =

Family of fungi

The Placynthiaceae are a lichenized family of fungi in the order Peltigerales. Species of this family are found largely in northern temperate regions.

== Genera ==
Numbers of species accepted by Species Fungorum;

- Hertella - 3 spp.
- Placynthiopsis - 1 sp. (Placynthiopsis africana Zahlbr. (1932))
- Placynthium - 20 spp.
