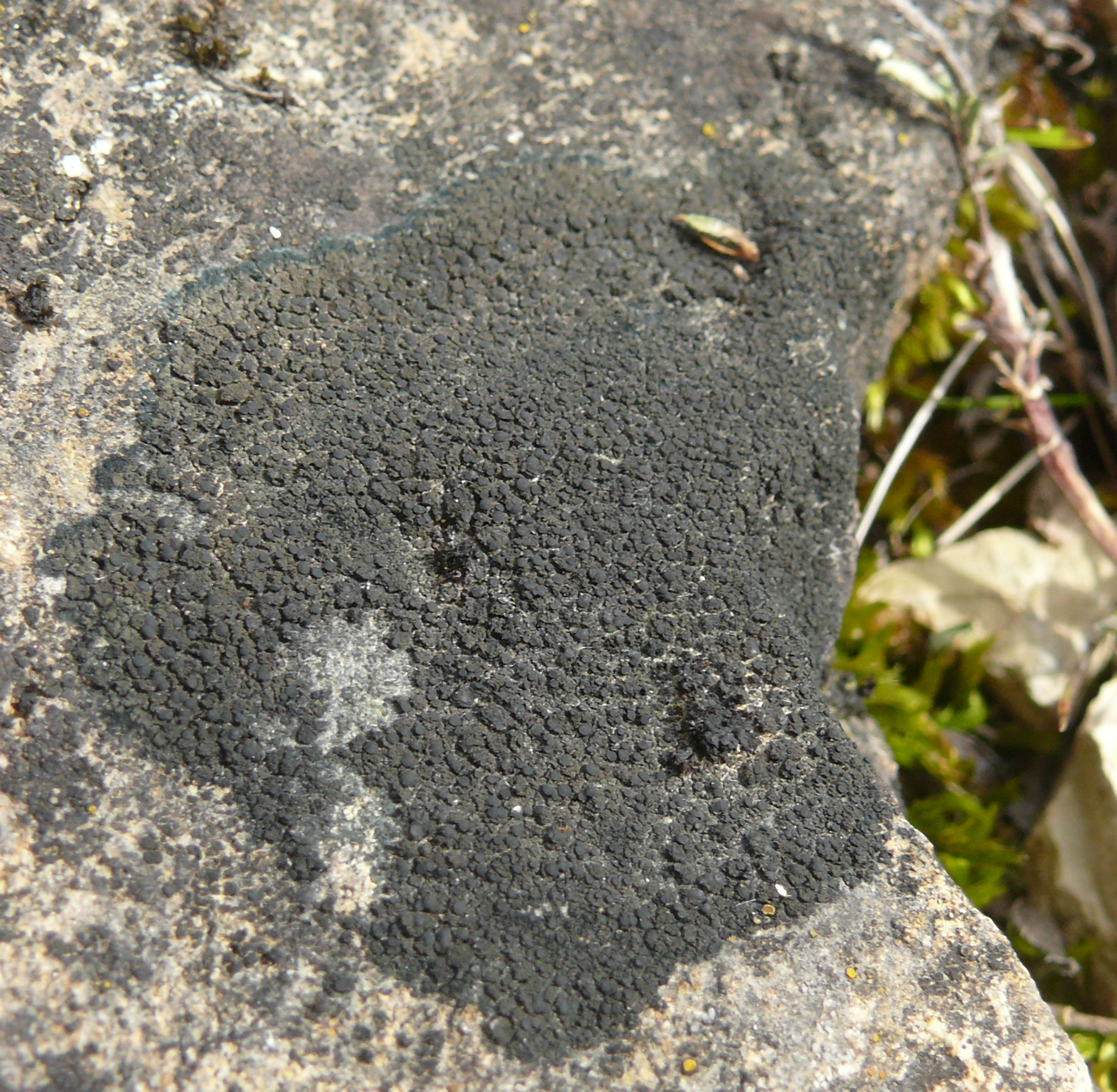
- Placynthium nigrum

Scientific classification
- Domain: Eukaryota
- Kingdom: Fungi
- Division: Ascomycota
- Class: Lecanoromycetes
- Order: Peltigerales
- Family: Placynthiaceae
- Genus: Placynthium (Ach.) Gray (1821)

Type species
- Placynthium nigrum (Huds.) Gray (1821)

Synonyms
- Collema † Placynthium Ach. (1810)

= Placynthium =

Genus of lichens

Placynthium is a genus of lichen-forming fungi in the family Placynthiaceae. Members of this genus are commonly called blackthread lichens.

== Species ==
- Placynthium anemoideum (Servít) Gyeln. (1938)
- Placynthium asperellum (Ach.) Trevis. (1869)
- Placynthium australiense P.M.McCarthy & Kantvilas (2014)
- Placynthium caesium (Ach.) Vain. (1909)
- Placynthium filiforme (Garov.) M.Choisy (1951)
- Placynthium flabellosum (Tuck.) Zahlbr. (1925)
- Placynthium garovaglii (A.Massal.) Malme (1918)
- Placynthium glaciale Fryday & T.Sprib. (2020)
- Placynthium hungaricum Gyeln. (1939)
- Placynthium lismorense (Cromb.) Vain. (1909)
- Placynthium majus Harm. (1913)
- Placynthium nigrum (Huds.) Gray (1821)
- Placynthium pannariellum (Nyl.) H.Magn. (1936)
- Placynthium petersii (Nyl.) Burnham (1922)
- Placynthium pluriseptatum (Arnold) Arnold (1889)
- Placynthium posterulum (Nyl.) Henssen (2007)
- Placynthium pulvinatum Øvstedal (2009)
- Placynthium subradiatum (Nyl.) Arnold (1884)
- Placynthium tantaleum (Hepp) Hue (1906)
- Placynthium tremniacum (A.Massal.) Jatta (1900)
