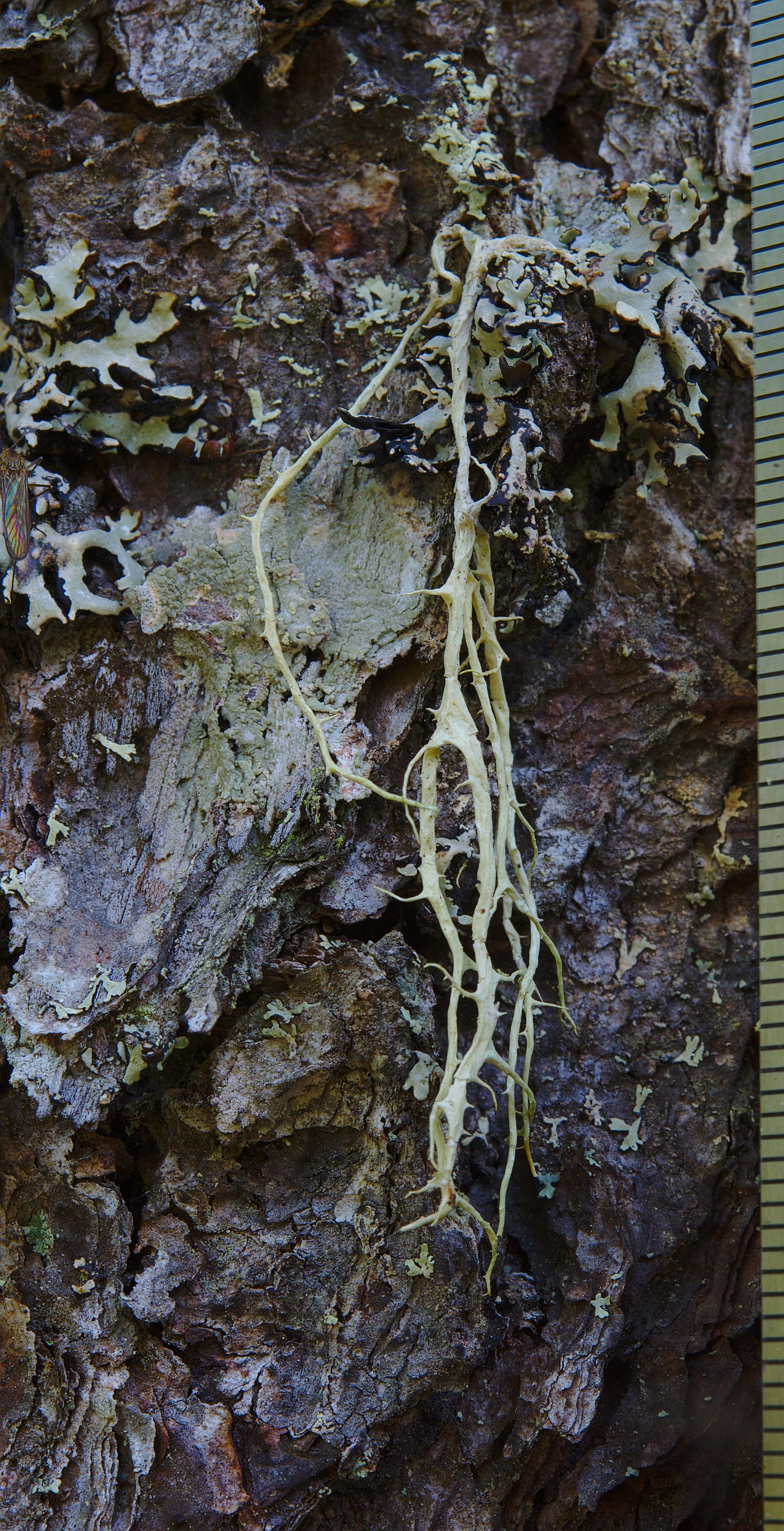

Conservation status
- Apparently Secure (NatureServe)

Scientific classification
- Kingdom: Fungi
- Division: Ascomycota
- Class: Lecanoromycetes
- Order: Lecanorales
- Family: Parmeliaceae
- Genus: Evernia
- Species: E. divaricata

Binomial name
- Evernia divaricata (L.) Ach. (1810)

Synonyms
- Lichen divaricatus L. (1768)

= Evernia divaricata =

Species of lichen-forming fungus

Evernia divaricata is a species of lichen belonging to the family Parmeliaceae.

== Distribution ==
It has a cosmopolitan distribution. It can be found in western North America, Europe, the Near East, and China.

== See also ==
- List of lichens named by Carl Linnaeus
