= Wart lichen =

Wart lichen may refer to lichens in different genera, which are not all in the same family:

- Porina
- Pyrenula
- Staurothele
- Verrucaria
