= Felt lichen =

Felt lichen may refer to:

- Peltigera malacea, felt lichen
- Erioderma pedicellatum, boreal felt lichen
