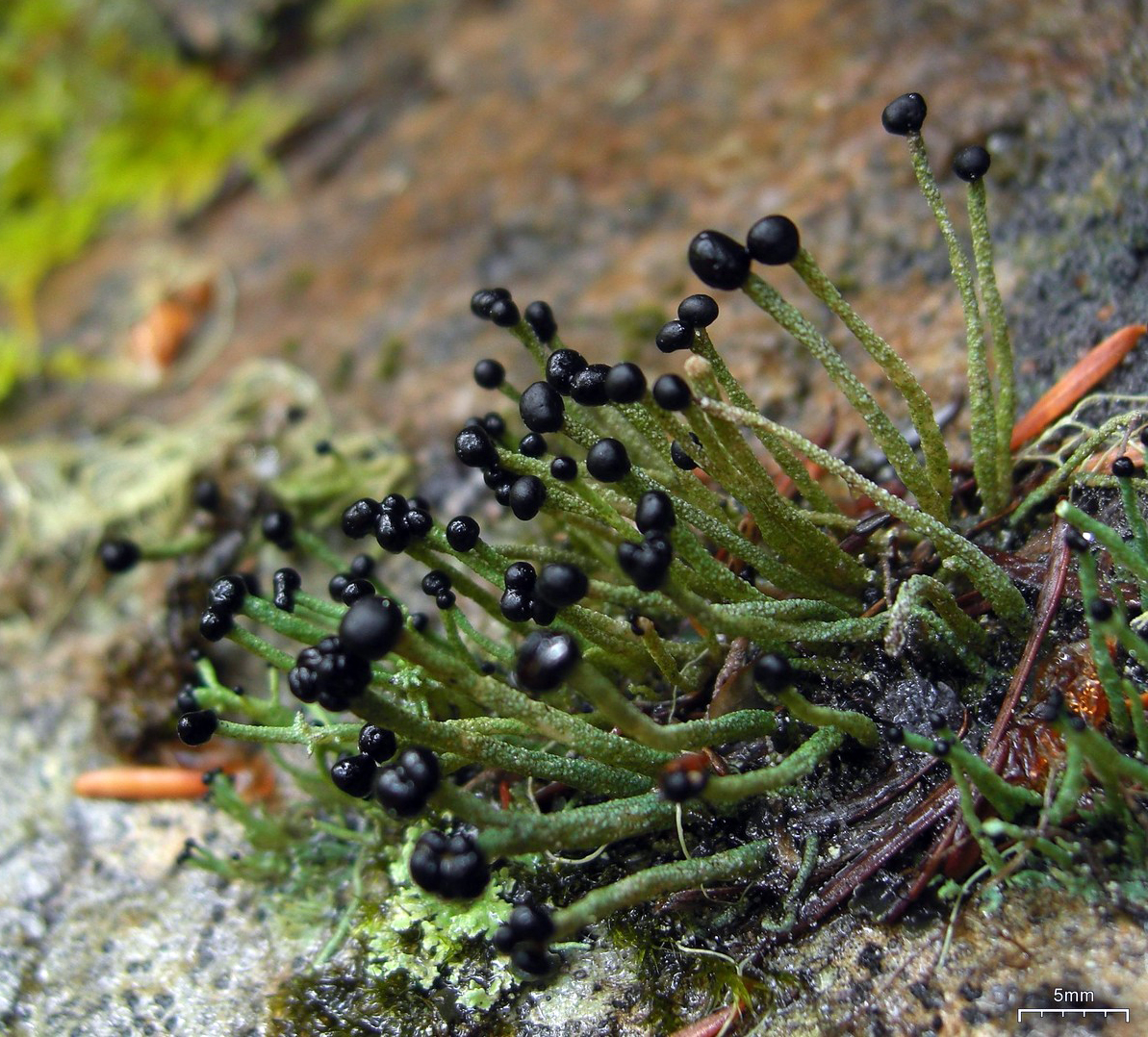

Conservation status
- Secure (NatureServe)

Scientific classification
- Kingdom: Fungi
- Division: Ascomycota
- Class: Lecanoromycetes
- Order: Lecanorales
- Family: Cladoniaceae
- Genus: Pilophorus
- Species: P. acicularis

Binomial name
- Pilophorus acicularis (Ach.) Th. Fr. (1857)

Synonyms
- Baeomyces acicularis Ach. (1803); Cenomyces acicularis (Ach.) Ach. (1810); Cladonia acicularis (Ach.) Fr. (1831); Stereocaulon aciculare (Ach.) Tuck. (1845); Pilophoron aciculare (Ach.) Nyl. (1857)

= Pilophorus acicularis =

Species of lichen-forming fungus

Pilophorus acicularis, commonly known as the nail lichen or the devil's matchstick lichen, is a species of matchstick lichen in the family Cladoniaceae.

P. aciculare has both crustose (crust-like) and fruticose thallus (shrub-like) body parts. The lichen starts out as a granular crust on the rock surface, and develops fruticose stalks, or pseudopodetia, up to 3 cm (1.2 in) tall and about 1 mm thick that have rounded black apothecia at the tips. The stalks are erect and curved so as to appear combed. It grows directly on silicate rocks in dense clusters. It is found on the west coast of North America up to Alaska, and in eastern Eurasia. In addition to green algae, the lichen contains cyanobacteria that help contribute to soil fertility by supplying fixed nitrogen.

It was originally described in 1803, and transferred to the genus Pilophorus in 1857.

== History, taxonomy and phylogeny ==
- - Several members of the family Sphaerophoraceae
  - - - - Cladonia bellidiflora (Cladoniaceae)
        - Pilophorus acicularis (Cladoniaceae)
      - Stereocaulon ramulosum (Stereocaulaceae)
    - Lecanora dispersa (Lecanoraceae)

Phylogeny and relationships of P. acicula and other species of Lecanorales based on analysis of nuclear SSU rDNA sequences. Familial placement is shown in parentheses.

The species was first described in 1803 as Baeomyces acicularis by the Swedish botanist and "father of lichenology" Erik Acharius. The taxon was transferred to several different genera in the next few decades resulting in several synonyms, including Cenomyces acicularis (by Acharius in 1810), Cladonia acicularis (Elias Magnus Fries in 1831), and Stereocaulon aciculare (Edward Tuckerman in 1845). Elias Fries's son Thore Magnus transferred the species to his then newly created genus Pilophorus in 1857. William Nylander also published the combination Pilophorus acicularis in 1857, but later analysis suggested that Fries's combination was published first, and under the Principle of Priority, the correct citation of the species is Pilophorus acicularis (Ach.) Th.Fr. (1857).

The genus Pilophorus was until recently considered to be a member of the family Stereocaulaceae by some authors. Analysis of small subunit ribosomal DNA sequences showed P. acicularis to be more closely related to the Cladoniaceae, rather than the Stereocaulaceae.

The specific epithet aciculare is derived from the Latin acicularis, meaning "needle-like". The lichen is commonly known as the "devil's matchstick"; the common name for the genus—"nail lichen"—is also used.

== Description ==
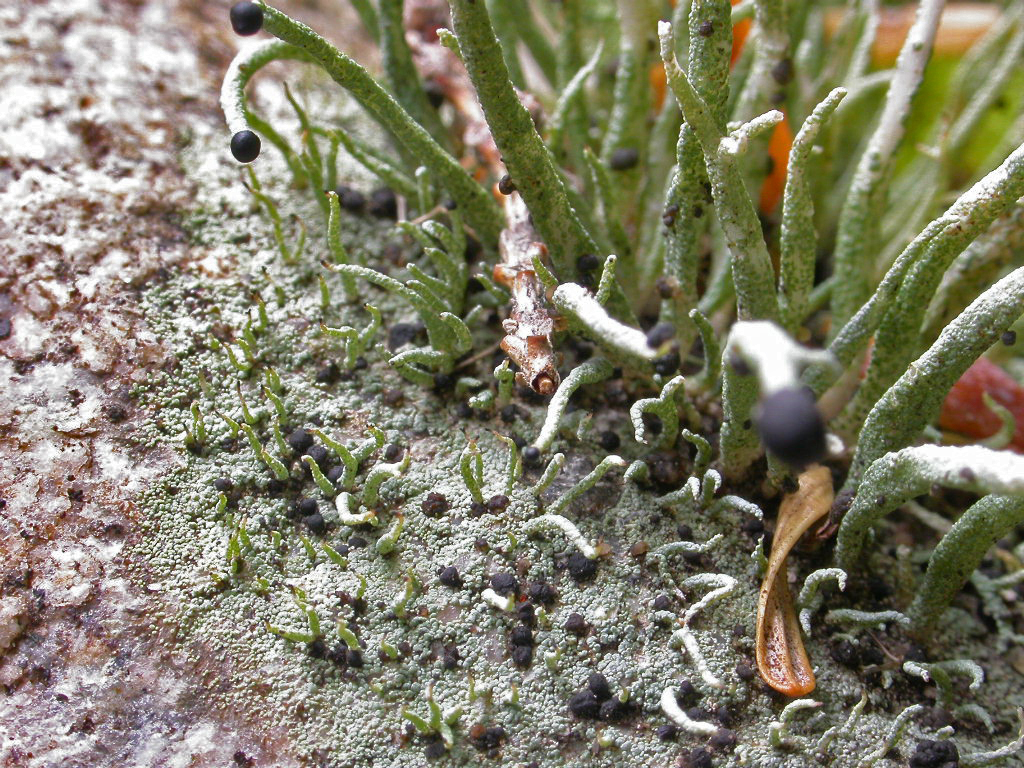
A crust-like thallus and developing pseudopodetia are evident beside taller, more mature pseudopodetia.

The thallus is the vegetative body of a lichen that contains the lichen mycobiont (fungus) and the photobiont (algae and/or cyanobacteria). In P. acicularis, the primary thallus (thallus horizontalis) is spread out like a granular crust on the surface of its substrate. It is light green when young, but becomes gray in age or when dry. The pseudopodetia (upright stalk-like extensions of the thallus made of vegetative tissue) range from 0.5 to 3 cm (0.2 to 1.2 in) high, and are about 1 mm thick; they grow in dense clusters. Most pseudopodetia are either unbranched or forked into two branches, with the stalks curved so as to appear as if combed; less frequently, they are erect like pins, and up to 1 cm (0.4 in) tall. Some specimens are highly branched in the upper part of the pseudopodetia, causing them to bear some resemblance to P. robustus, although this morphology is uncommon. Internally, the pseudopodetia are solid when young, becoming hollow with age, and are composed of long, thin, highly gelatinized hyphae with narrow cavities about 0.5 μm wide. The lower part of older pseudopodetia becomes blackened internally. The algal layer is not continuous—contrasting with lichen species that have thalli that stratify into discrete tissue types, including a photobiont layer—and occurs with the mycobiont in the form of granules. These granules may be absent from some parts of the thallus surface. Pycnidia (flask-like structures, resembling perithecia, in which conidia are produced) occur in the tips of small sterile pseudopodetia or in the tips of small lateral branches of older pseudopodetia.

The conidiophores of P. acicularis are 30 μm long, and unbranched. They have terminal sickle-shaped conidia that measure 6 by 1 μm. The apothecia (reproductive structures covered with the spore-producing asci) are abundant, usually with one or several on the tips of the pseudopodetia. They are black, hemispherical or roughly triangular, and measure up to 1.5 mm in diameter. The hymenium (the fertile spore-bearing layer of cells containing the asci) is up to 240 μm thick, and about two-thirds of it is pigmented; the lower part of the hymenium is sterile, consisting of only paraphyses. The asci are eight-spored. The ascospores are rounded when young, becoming spindle-shaped when mature, with dimensions of 21.0–29.5 by 4.5–5.5 μm. The generative tissue (hyphae that eventually forms the thallus) is closely interwoven with short, broad cells that have large cavities. The generative tissue is pigmented black-brown, with the color being most intense below the paraphyses, becoming less so towards the stalk region.

Pilophorus acicularis is a tripartite lichen—containing a fungus, a green alga, and a cyanobacterium. Cephalodia (lichenized aggregations of nitrogen-fixing cyanobacteria) are present on the primary thallus; smaller cephalodia are also on the pseudopodetia. Hemispherical to irregularly shaped, and light to dark brown in color, they contain species from the genus Nostoc. The green algal photosynthetic symbiont (photobiont) associated with P. acicularis is Asterochloris magna (formerly Trebouxia magna).

=== Similar species ===
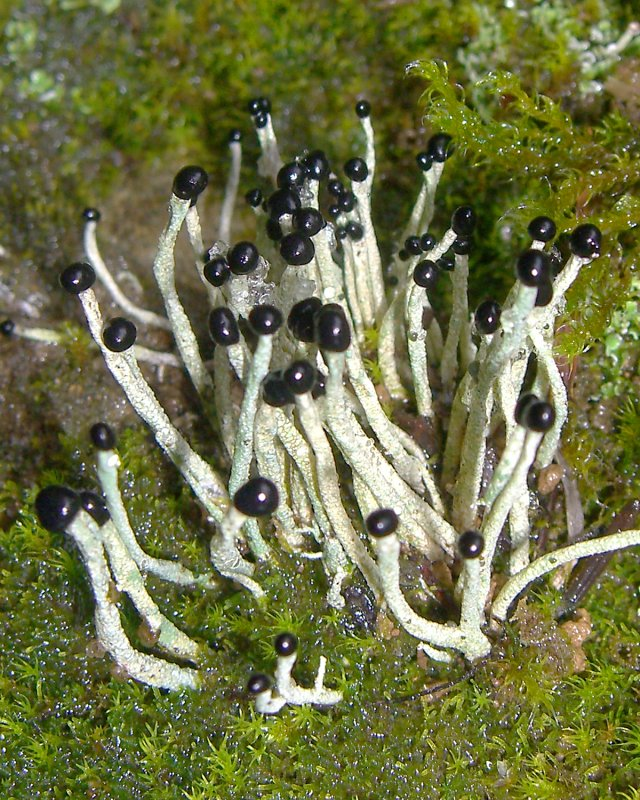
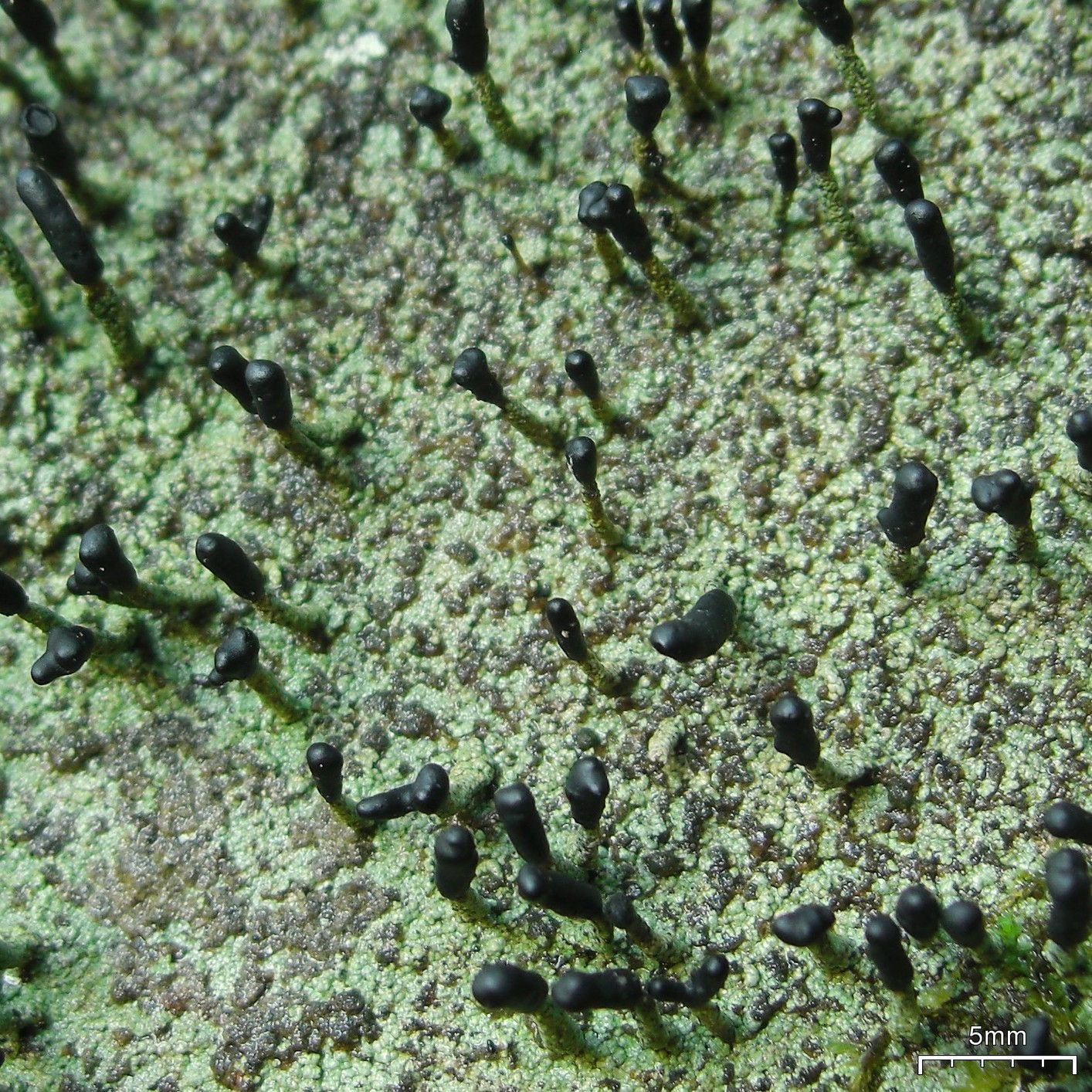
Comparison of Pilophorus acicularis (left) and the lookalike species P. clavatus (right)

Pilophorus acicularis can be separated from similar species by its tall pseudopodetia. It may be confused with P. robustus, especially in material from Alaska where both species occur together. Usually, the different branching (umbellate in P. robustus versus dichotomous in P. acicularis) and the lack of a columella (an internal, column-shaped structure) in longitudinal sections of the pseudopodetia of P. acicularis make it relatively easy to distinguish between the two.

Pilophyllus clavatus, a species found in Western North America, Japan, Taiwan and South Korea, resembles P. acicularis, but it has much shorter pseudopodetia—up to 1.5 cm (0.6 in) long.

== Habitat and distribution ==
The lichen typically grows on silicate stone, rarely on decaying wood. It is usually in partial shade in openings in low to mid-elevation moist forests, and is also frequently found in rocky roadcuts. Lichens with cephalodia are capable of fixing nitrogen, and contribute nitrogen to the ecosystem.

P. acicularis is probably the most abundant species of the genus. Most specimens have been found on the west coast of North America as far north as Alaska, but it has been reported most frequently from British Columbia and Washington. The species is found in China, Japan, and Taiwan, and has also been reported from the Russian arctic. In general, P. acicularis seems to prefer an oceanic climate without extremely low temperatures, at least in comparison with other species of the genus. This assumption is supported by the fact that P. acicularis is found more southerly (34 findings in California) than all other species and is less frequently found in northern Alaska where, for example, P. robustus and P. vegae are more common. P. acicularis is rare east of the Rocky Mountains.
