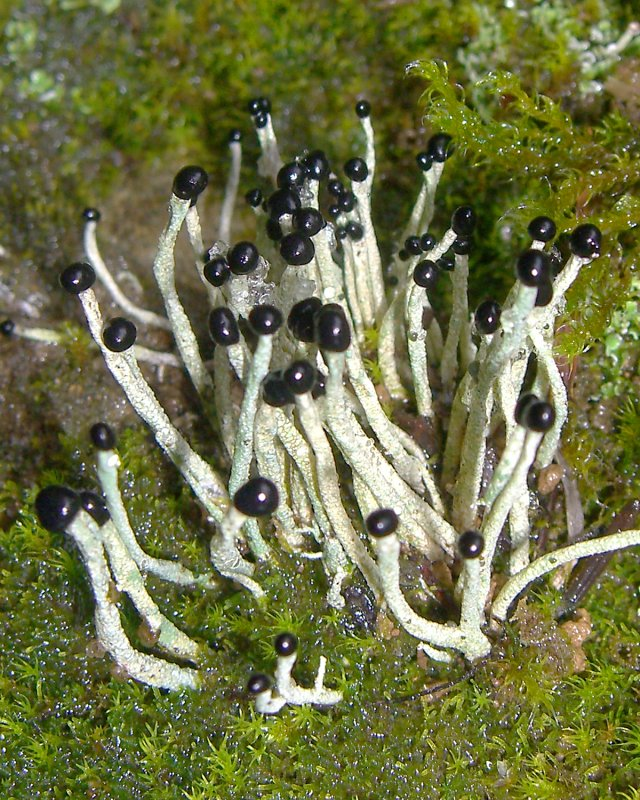
- Pilophorus acicularis

Scientific classification
- Kingdom: Fungi
- Division: Ascomycota
- Class: Lecanoromycetes
- Order: Lecanorales
- Family: Cladoniaceae
- Genus: Pilophorus; Th.Fr. (1857)

Type species
- Pilophorus robustus Th.Fr. (1857)

= Pilophorus (fungus) =

Genus of lichens

Pilophorus is a genus of lichen-forming fungi in the family Cladoniaceae. They are commonly known as matchstick lichens. The genus has a widespread distribution, especially in temperate regions, and contains 11 species.

== Taxonomy ==
The genus was circumscribed by Theodor Magnus Fries in 1857, with Pilophorus robustus assigned as the type species.

== Description ==
Species of Pilophorus have a two-part vegetative body (thallus). The primary thallus forms a thin crust that spreads across the substrate and breaks into fine grains or small, tile-like patches (areoles). From this crust arise the secondary structures—short, solid uprights commonly termed pseudopodetia. Unlike those of Cladonia, these stalks are not hollow. The outer "skin" (cortex) is poorly developed. The main photosynthetic partner is a green alga in the genus Asterochloris, but small, internal wart-like bodies called cephalodia also occur; these house cyanobacteria (Nostoc or Stigonema), allowing the lichen to fix atmospheric nitrogen.

The sexual fruiting bodies (apothecia) sit at the tips of the pseudopodetia. They are almost spherical, lack a rim derived from the thallus (no thalline margin), and are characteristically black. Beneath the disc the supporting tissue (hypothecium) is dark brown. The internal tissue between the spore sacs (the hamathecium) consists of slender threads (paraphyses) that are only sparingly branched and sometimes fuse, with tips that are barely swollen. The spore sacs (asci) are club-shaped, contain eight spores, and are of the Porpidia-type. The spores themselves are colourless, usually without internal cross-walls (aseptate), and range from ellipsoidal to spindle-shaped; they lack a distinct outer sheath (perispore).

Asexual reproduction occurs in small, flask-like structures (pycnidia) that are also formed at the tops of short pseudopodetia, often ringed by a collar of granules. These produce colourless, curved (sickle-shaped), non-septate conidia from slender, cylindrical spore-forming cells. Chemically, Pilophorus species contain the common secondary metabolite (lichen product) atranorin, and may also contain zeorin. They grow mainly on rock in temperate, mountainous regions. The combination of black, globose apothecia on solid pseudopodetia helps separate Pilophorus from similar genera: Cladonia lacks black apothecia and usually has hollow stalks, while Stereocaulon bears flat, red-brown apothecia and produces multi-celled spores (typically 2–14-celled). Within the Cladoniaceae, the way cephalodia are formed in Pilophorus is distinctive to this genus.

== Species ==
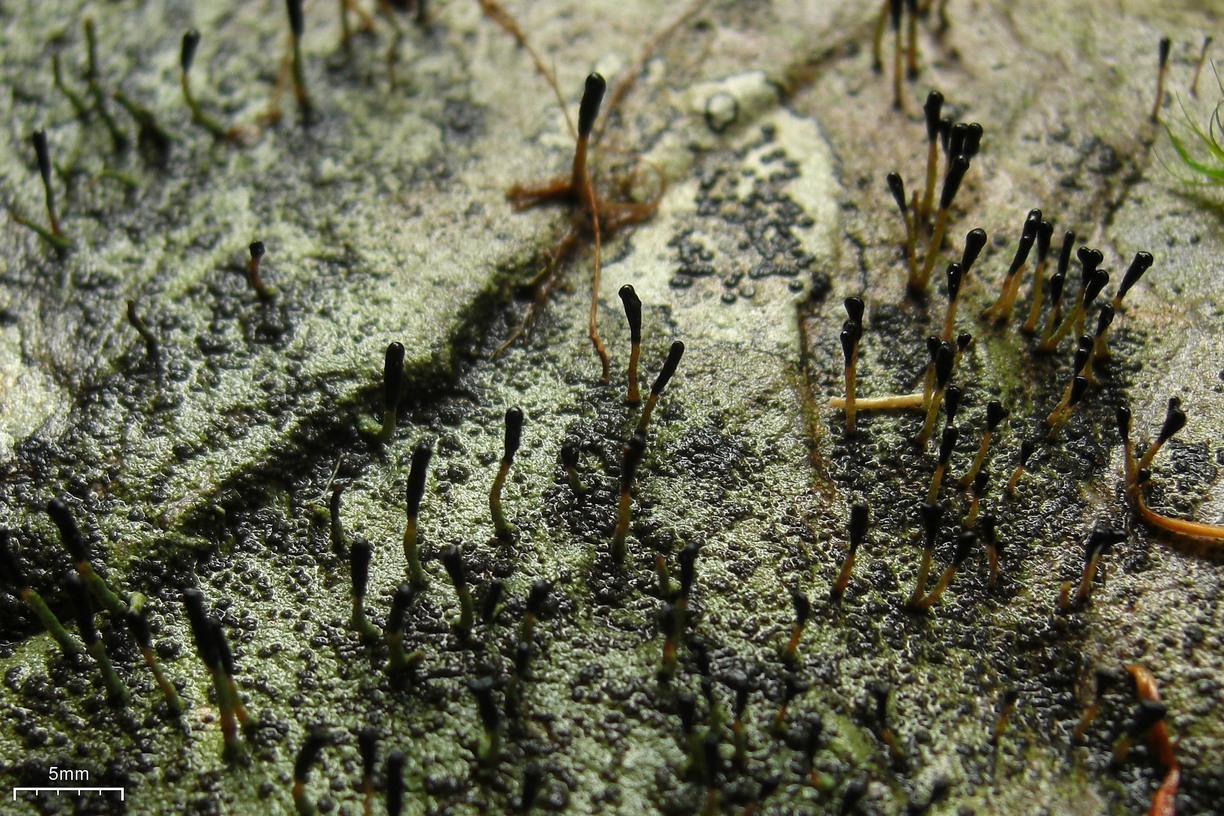
Pilophorus clavatus

- Pilophorus acicularis (Ach.) Th.Fr. (1857)
- Pilophorus cereolus Ach.) Th.Fr. (1871)
- Pilophorus clavatus Th.Fr. (1888)
- Pilophorus dovrensis (Nyl.) Timdal, Hertel & Rambold (1988)
- Pilophorus fibula (Tuck.) Tuck. (1882)
- Pilophorus fruticosus Li S.Wang & Xin Y.Wang (2011) – China
- Pilophorus hallii (Tuck.) Vain. (1921)
- Pilophorus nigricaulis M.Satô (1940)
- Pilophorus pallidus (Körb.) Timdal (1988)
- Pilophorus robustus Th.Fr. (1857)
- Pilophorus strumaticus Nyl. ex Cromb. (1875)
- Pilophorus vegae Krog (1968)
- Pilophorus yunnanensis Li S.Wang & Xin Y.Wang (2010) – China
