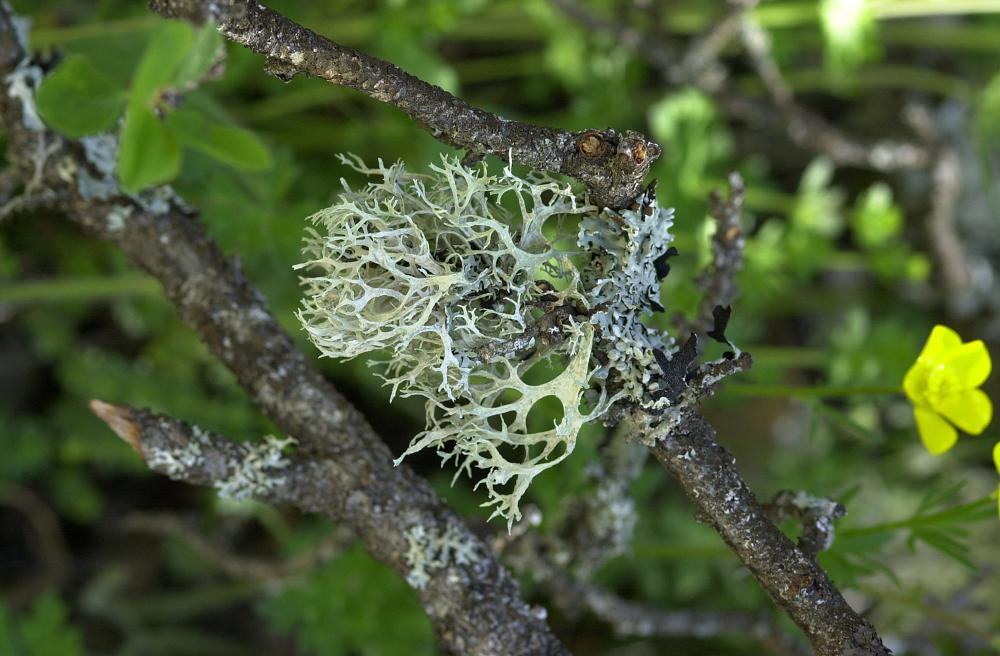
- Evernia prunastri

Scientific classification
- Domain: Eukaryota
- Kingdom: Fungi
- Division: Ascomycota
- Class: Lecanoromycetes
- Order: Lecanorales
- Family: Parmeliaceae
- Genus: Evernia; Ach. (1809)

Type species
- Evernia prunastri (L.) Ach. (1810)

Species
- Evernia divaricata Evernia esorediosa Evernia illyrica Evernia mesomorpha Evernia prunastri

= Evernia =

Genus of lichens

Evernia is a genus of bushy lichens in the family Parmeliaceae. Oakmoss Evernia prunastri is used as a fixative agent in Eau de Cologne within the perfume industry. It is green on top and white on bottom, and divides evenly into "forks"; it becomes very soft when wet. It is not to be confused with Ramalina, which is straplike, stiff and bristly, green on top and bottom, and divides unevenly. Evernia is an abundant genus, found growing on trees.

== Description ==
Evernia species form soft, shrubby to strap-shaped thalli that either drape pendently from bark or lie prostrate when growing on the ground. A spreading basal holdfast secures the thallus, from which numerous flattened lobes branch repeatedly. In most species the lobes are angular and subtly ridged, but in E. prunastri they are distinctly two-sided (dorsiventral). Both upper and lower surfaces are corticate, yet the underside is invariably paler. The upper surface often develops shallow pits, while the interior medulla consists of a loosely woven mass of fungal hyphae that gives the thallus its flexible texture. Green, single-celled algae (a chlorococcoid photobiont) live between the hyphae and provide photosynthetic carbon to the partnership.

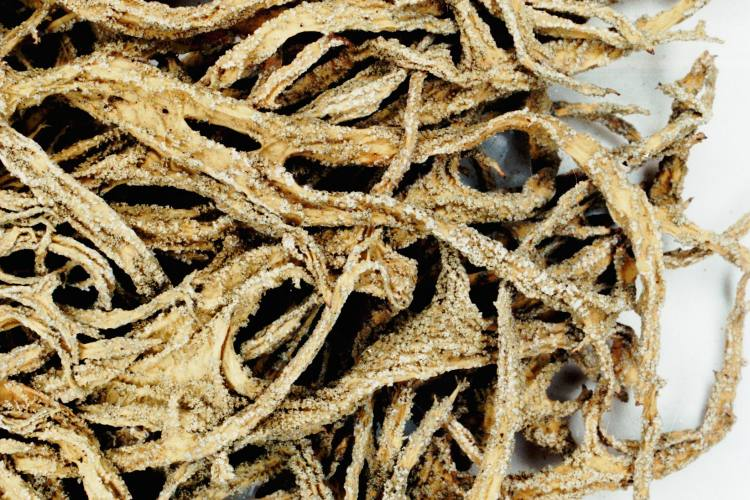
Evernia mesomorpha

Sexual reproduction in Evernia lichens occurs in small, disc-shaped fruit bodies (apothecia) that arise on the lobe margins. These apothecia sit on short, stout stalks; their discs are chestnut-red and bordered by an irregular, scalloped rim formed from lichen tissue (the thalline margin). Inside each cylindrical ascus develop eight colourless, single-celled ascospores typical of the Lecanora group. Asexual propagules are produced sparingly: minute flask-like pycnidia are immersed in the thallus surface and appear as tiny dark dots. Each pycnidium releases long, needle-shaped conidia that can establish new individuals without the need for sexual fusion.

The chemistry of Evernia is consistent and useful for identification. When a drop of potassium hydroxide (KOH) solution is applied, the cortex stains yellow owing to the presence of the substance atranorin, and in some specimens usnic acid is also present. The medulla usually contains evernic acid, but in some extra-European species this is replaced by divaricatic acid.

== Species ==
- Evernia divaricata (L.) Ach. (1810)
- Evernia esorediosa (Müll.Arg.) Du Rietz (1924)
- Evernia illyrica (Zahlbr.) Du Rietz (1926)
- Evernia prunastri (L.) Ach. (1810)
- Evernia mesomorpha Nyl. (1861)
