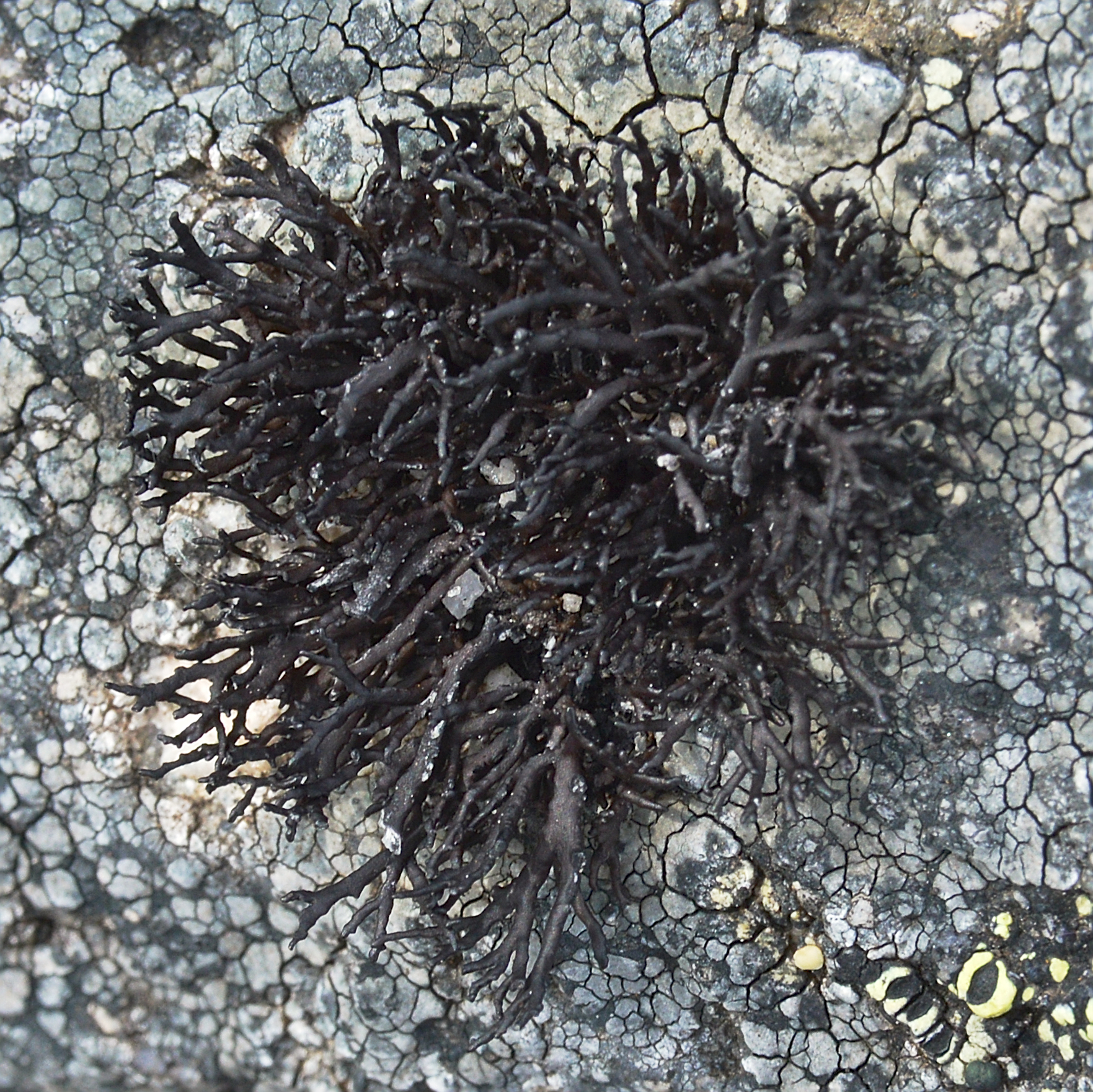
- Cornicularia normoerica

Conservation status
- Apparently Secure (NatureServe)

Scientific classification
- Kingdom: Fungi
- Division: Ascomycota
- Class: Lecanoromycetes
- Order: Lecanorales
- Family: Parmeliaceae
- Genus: Cornicularia (Schreb.) Ach. (1803)
- Species: C. normoerica

Binomial name
- Cornicularia normoerica (Gunnerus) Du Rietz (1926)

Synonyms
- List: Genus; Lichen sect. Cornicularia Schreb. (1791); Species; Lichen normoericus Gunnerus (1772); Cetraria normoerica (Gunnerus) Lynge (1921); Lichen fucoides With. (1776); Lichen tristis Weber (1778); Cornicularia tristis (Weber) Hoffm. (1794); Parmelia tristis (Weber) Spreng. (1827); Cetraria tristis (Weber) Fr. (1831); Parmelia fahlunensis var. tristis (Weber) Schaer. (1840); Platysma triste (Weber) Nyl. (1860); Imbricaria tristis (Weber) Anzi (1860); Alectoria tristis (Weber) Th.Fr. (1871); Lichen fucoides Wulfen (1791); Cornicularia normoerica f. fucoidos Zahlbr. (1930)

= Cornicularia =

Single-species genus of lichen

Cornicularia is a genus of lichenised ascomycetes in the large family Parmeliaceae. It is a monotypic genus, with a single currently accepted species, the saxicolous lichen Cornicularia normoerica, and is sometimes referred to as the bootstrap lichen. The lichen forms small, dark tufts rarely exceeding 2 cm in height that are anchored so firmly to rocks, with narrow, stiff branches topped by shiny black reproductive discs. It grows on high-elevation, sun-exposed rocks and boulders, where its compact, shrub-like appearance and glossy black-brown surface make it distinctive among mountain lichens.

== Taxonomy ==
Cornicularia was originally proposed as a section of the genus Lichen by Johann Christian Daniel von Schreber in 1791. Erik Acharius promoted it to generic status in 1803.

== Description ==
Cornicularia is represented by a single species, Cornicularia normoerica, which forms neat, dark tufts that rarely exceed 2 cm in height. The lichen body (thallus) stands erect and is anchored so firmly that it must be cut or scraped away from rock or bark. Its main branches are narrow—about 0.3–0.6 mm across—stiff, and slightly flattened, with few side-branches. Each branch tapers abruptly near the tip and arises from a repeatedly dividing holdfast, giving the tuft a shrub-like outline. The surface is a glossy black-brown and is protected by an unusually thick outer skin (cortex) made of densely packed, parallel hyphae. Inside, the fungal partner shelters rounded green algal cells of the genus Trebouxia, which supply photosynthetic sugars.

Reproduction in C. normoerica is mainly sexual: most branch tips carry black, shiny discs (apothecia) one to five millimetres wide. These discs may sprout a few short, rod-like extensions and gradually overtop the branch apex. Each spore sac (ascus) is club-shaped with a thickened tip and releases eight smooth, colourless ascospores measuring about 5–6 × 3–4 μm. Asexual propagules also occur: half-sunken, spherical pycnidia dot the branch ends and secrete thread-like conidia roughly 6.5–7.5 μm long. Chemical analyses have yet to detect any secondary metabolites, which differentiates the species from many other shrubby lichens in the family Parmeliaceae. The combination of a firmly attached, sparsely branched tuft, abundant apical apothecia, and the absence of detectable lichen products are characters to help distinguish C. normoerica in the field.

== Ecology ==
Cornicularia normoerica is a saxicolous (rock-dwelling) species, growing on high-elevation, sun-exposed rocks and boulders.
