= Rim lichen =

Rim lichen is a common name for lichens in either the genus Lecanora or the genus Squamarina
