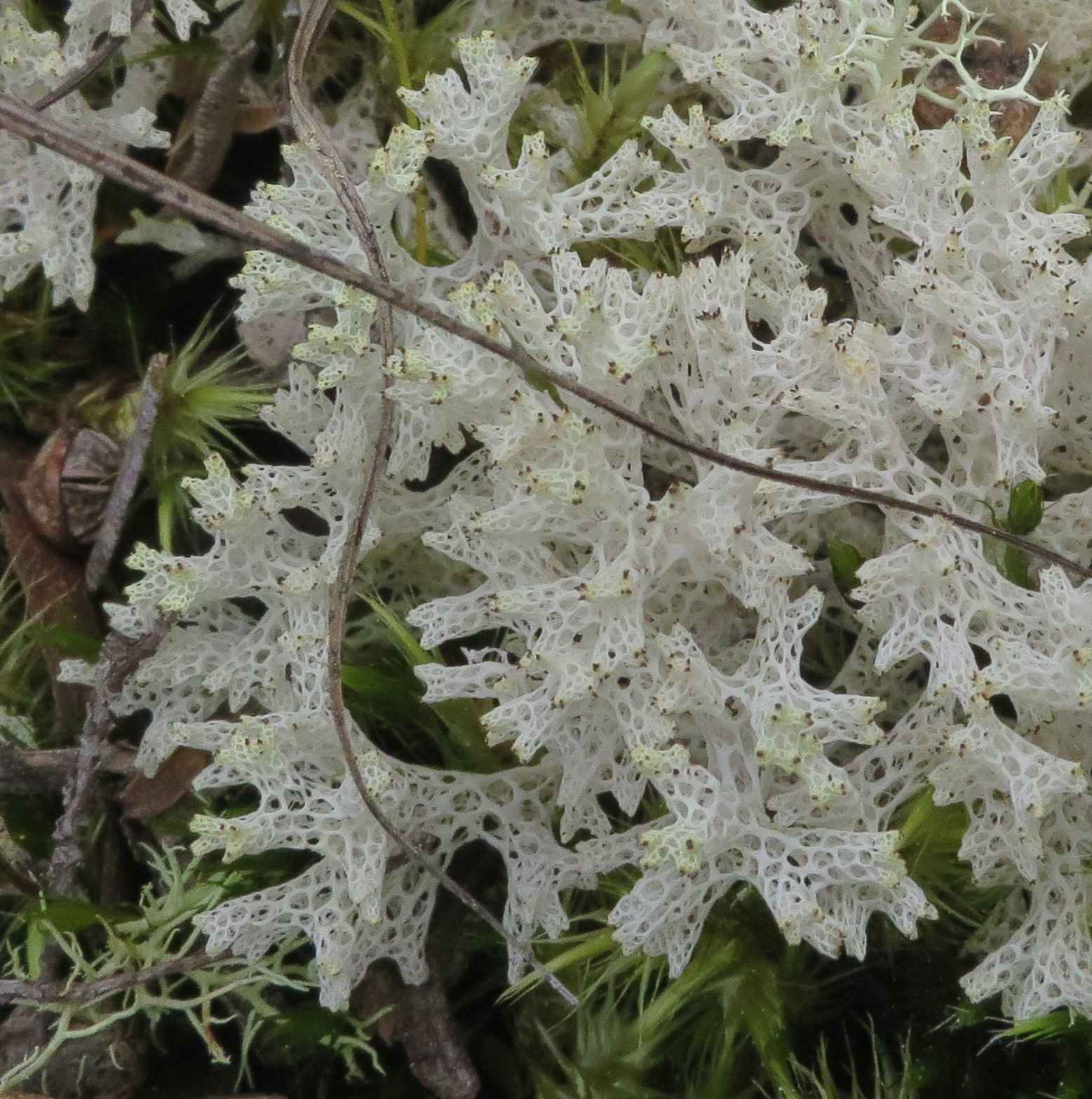

Scientific classification
- Kingdom: Fungi
- Division: Ascomycota
- Class: Lecanoromycetes
- Order: Lecanorales
- Family: Cladoniaceae
- Genus: Pulchrocladia
- Species: P. retipora

Binomial name
- Pulchrocladia retipora (Labill.) S.Stenroos, Pino-Bodas & Ahti (2018)

Synonyms
- List: Baeomyces reteporus Labill. (1806); Lichen retiporus (Labill.) DC. (1813); Cenomyce retipora (Labill.) Ach. (1814); Pycnothelia retipora (Labill.) Fée (1825); Cladonia retipora (Labill.) Fr. (1826); Cladina retipora (Labill.) Nyl. (1868); Cladia retipora (Labill.) Nyl. (1876); Clathrina retipora (Labill.) Müll.Arg. (1883)

= Pulchrocladia retipora =

Species of fruticose lichen

Pulchrocladia retipora, commonly known as the coral lichen, is a species of fruticose lichen in the family Cladoniaceae. Found predominantly in Australasia, its habitats range from the Australian Capital Territory to New Zealand's North and South Islands, and even the Pacific region of New Caledonia, where it grows in coastal and alpine heathlands. The lichen features coral-like branches and subbranches with numerous intricate, netlike perforations. It is known by multiple names, with some sources referring to it by its synonym Cladia retipora, or the common name lace lichen.

The lichen was first scientifically collected by the French biologist Jacques Labillardière on board Bruni d'Entrecasteaux's 1792 expedition. Labillardière erroneously classified it as an alga rather than a lichen. Pulchrocladia retipora holds the distinction of being the first Australian lichen to be scientifically documented. It is now the type species of the genus Pulchrocladia. This genus was established in 2018 as a result of a molecular phylogenetics-led restructuring of the Cladoniaceae.

== Taxonomy ==
The species was first formally described by Jacques Labillardière in 1806, as Baeomyces reteporus. The type specimen was collected from Tasmania. This sample was obtained as part of the botanical collections he made during Labillardière's 1791–1794 voyage to the South Seas with the French explorer Antoine Bruni d'Entrecasteaux in an unsuccessful search for the French naval officer Jean-François de Galaup, comte de Lapérouse. Labillardière had first collected the lichen in 1792, and published the description in Novae Hollandiae Plantarum Specimen, erroneously describing the lichen as an alga. According to the Australian lichenologist Rex Filson, this lichen was the first to be described for Australia.

In its taxonomic history, the species has been shuffled to several genera, some of which are no longer used or have been synonymized with other genera. In 1814, the Swedish botanist Erik Acharius changed the spelling of the specific epithet to retipora (from retepora) when he introduced the new combination Cenomyce retipora. It is not known for certain if Acharius's change was intentional, as he still referred to the basionym as Baeomyces retiporus Labill. The term rete translates to "net", and the correct connecting vowel in such compounds is "i", making retiporus the appropriate spelling. The original spelling by Labillardière is considered an orthographical variant due to the lack of evidence indicating a deliberate choice of spelling. Since retipora is widely recognized, the current spelling has been maintained to avoid confusion.

Other genera that have housed the species are Pycnothelia (Fée, 1825), Cladonia (Fries, 1826), Cladina (Nylander, 1868), Cladia (Nylander, 1876), and Clathrina (Johann Müller, 1883). Nylander proposed the genus Cladia in 1870 to contain three Cladonia species based on their shared trait of having a cortex made of conglutinate (stuck together), longitudinally aligned filaments. In 1883, the Swiss botanist Johannes Müller Argoviensis suggested that the name Cladia could be confused with Cladium (a genus of sedges), and proposed a replacement genus Clathrina. Nylander persisted with the genus name Cladia, a decision that was largely accepted by later taxonomists. Cladia retiporus was the most prevalent name for the lichen for more than a century.

Pulchrocladia retipora is now the type species of genus Pulchrocladia, which was circumscribed in 2018 by Soili Stenroos, Raquel Pino-Bodas, Helge Thorsten Lumbsch, and Teuvo Ahti following a large-scale molecular phylogenetic analysis of the family Cladoniaceae.

It is commonly known as the coral lichen, or the lace lichen.

== Description ==
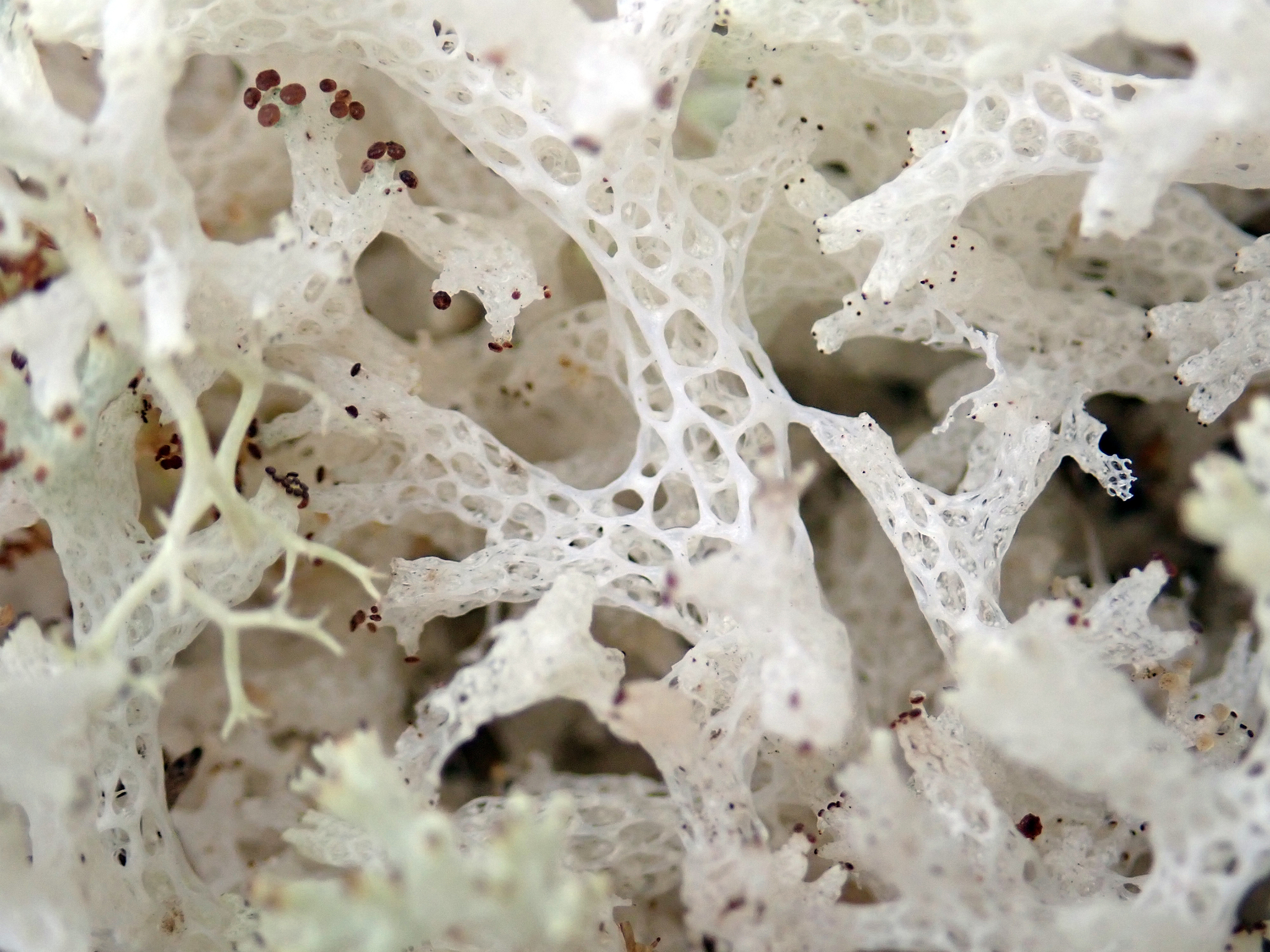
Closeup of highly perforated podetia, with dark reddish brown-coloured apothecia at the end of some branchlets

Like most species in the family Cladoniaceae, Pulchrocladia retipora has a cladoniiform growth form, meaning it has both a primary (horizontal) and secondary (vertical) thallus. The primary thallus is nodular (i.e. with small raised areas or swellings), white, and only lasts for a short period. Podetia are the secondary thallus that originate from the primary thallus. The podetia are typically up to 5 cm (2 in) tall, white to pale grey in colour, sometimes tinged pinkish or yellowing or superficially blackening at tips. They are rigid when dry, but become spongy when wet. They are irregularly or dichotomously branched, forming cushiony clumps. The wall is highly perforated (about 5–11 perforations per centimetre), with large, round to ellipsoidal holes. The surface of the podetium is continuously corticate and lacks soredia. The inner medulla is made of twisted strands of hyphae with a cobweb-like form. The lichen, nonetheless, generates soredia-like clusters of algal cells and hyphae within the strands of the inner medulla.

Apothecia occur infrequently. When present, they are small, black, peltate, and crowd together at the ends of small, terminal branches (branchlets). The colour of the hymenium ranges from dark reddish-brown to black. Ascospores have dimensions of 25–27 by 5 μm. The conidiomata end on branchlets, and are covered with translucent slime; they produce curved or straight conidia measuring 6 by 1 μm. Specimens collected in Australia tend to have a brownish colouring, while New Zealand specimens range from pure white to grey, to grayish-green, or slightly yellowish. The photobiont partner is green algae from the Trebouxia. Occasionally, free-living algae become trapped in the irregularly intertwined hyphae of the medulla.

Usnic acid and atranorin are the major secondary compounds present in Pulchrocladia retipora. Other compounds present in smaller quantities, identifiable through thin-layer chromatography, are protolichesterinic and ursolic acids, as well as rangiformic acid and norrangiformic acids in many cases. Usnic acid is thought to be responsible for the antimicrobial, antiviral and cytotoxic biological activity of Pulchrocladia retipora lichen extracts tested in in vitro experiments. The hue of P. retipora is determined by the concentration of usnic acid in the thallus, leading to a colour spectrum that ranges from an opaque greyish-white through yellowish-white to a distinct yellow.

Pulchrocladia retipora and P. corallaizon are closely related species, and their similarities may lead to confusion in identifying them. However, one can distinguish them by observing the inner-medulla of Pulchrocladia retipora, which is characteristically tightly packed. In the more mature pseudopodetia of C. corallaizon, there may be areas where the inner medulla is missing or appears less dense. Nonetheless, the medulla always remains compacted in the top branches of the pseudopodetia, ensuring it never appears stranded or corticated.

== Habitat and distribution ==
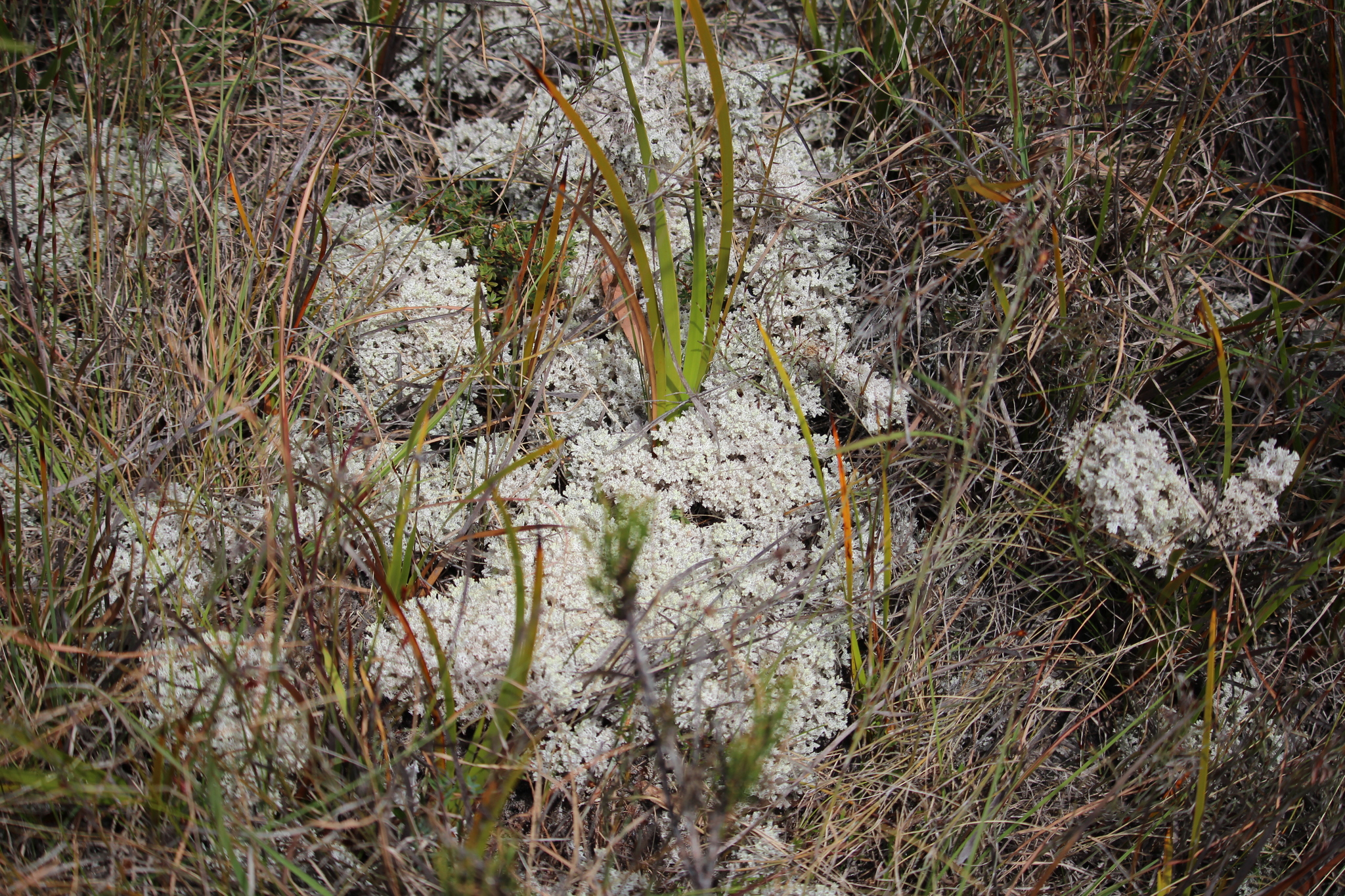
Pulchrocladia retipora in its native habitat

Pulchrocladia retipora is widely distributed throughout Australasia. In Australia, it has been recorded from the Australian Capital Territory, New South Wales, Queensland, Victoria, and Tasmania. In New Zealand, it is known from both the North and South Islands as well as the Antipodes Islands, Auckland Islands, Campbell Island, and Chatham Islands. In the Pacific, it occurs in New Caledonia.

The coral lichen is common in subalpine peat bogs; it is often found in association with the lichens Cladonia confusa, Rexiella sullivani, and Stereocaulon ramulosum. It is found on peaty soils among tussocks or in heaths comprising Dracophyllum and Leptospermum, most often at the margins of Nothofagus forests, in fellfield, or rarely on surfaces such as rocks, logs, and sand dunes. In the moorlands of the Meredith Range area in Tasmania, it thrives in well-drained, elevated locations, especially close to decomposing buttongrass hummocks.

The lichen replicates vegetatively when new podetia grow from fragments of old podetia. It has highly variable growth rates, ranging from less than 1 mm per year to up to a few centimetres per year. It has been noted to grow in clusters, sometimes up a metre in diameter. The unique morphology of the lichen helps it to survive the exposed heaths it inhabits, as the coral structure increases gas exchange, moderates temperature extremes, and maximises light and water access.

Pulchrocladia retipora grows in cushion-like growths ranging in diameter from about 10 centimetres (4 in) to 100 centimetres (40 in). The New Zealand botanist William Martin remarked finding square metre-sized cushions in the area of Lewis Pass in Canterbury, New Zealand. Lichen cushions about the size of a football have been observed growing on the mountain range in Australia's Grampians National Park. According to Martin, the lichen forms large growths only occur in subalpine zones, with lowland forms being only 5–10 centimetres (2–4 in) in size.

== Uses and research ==
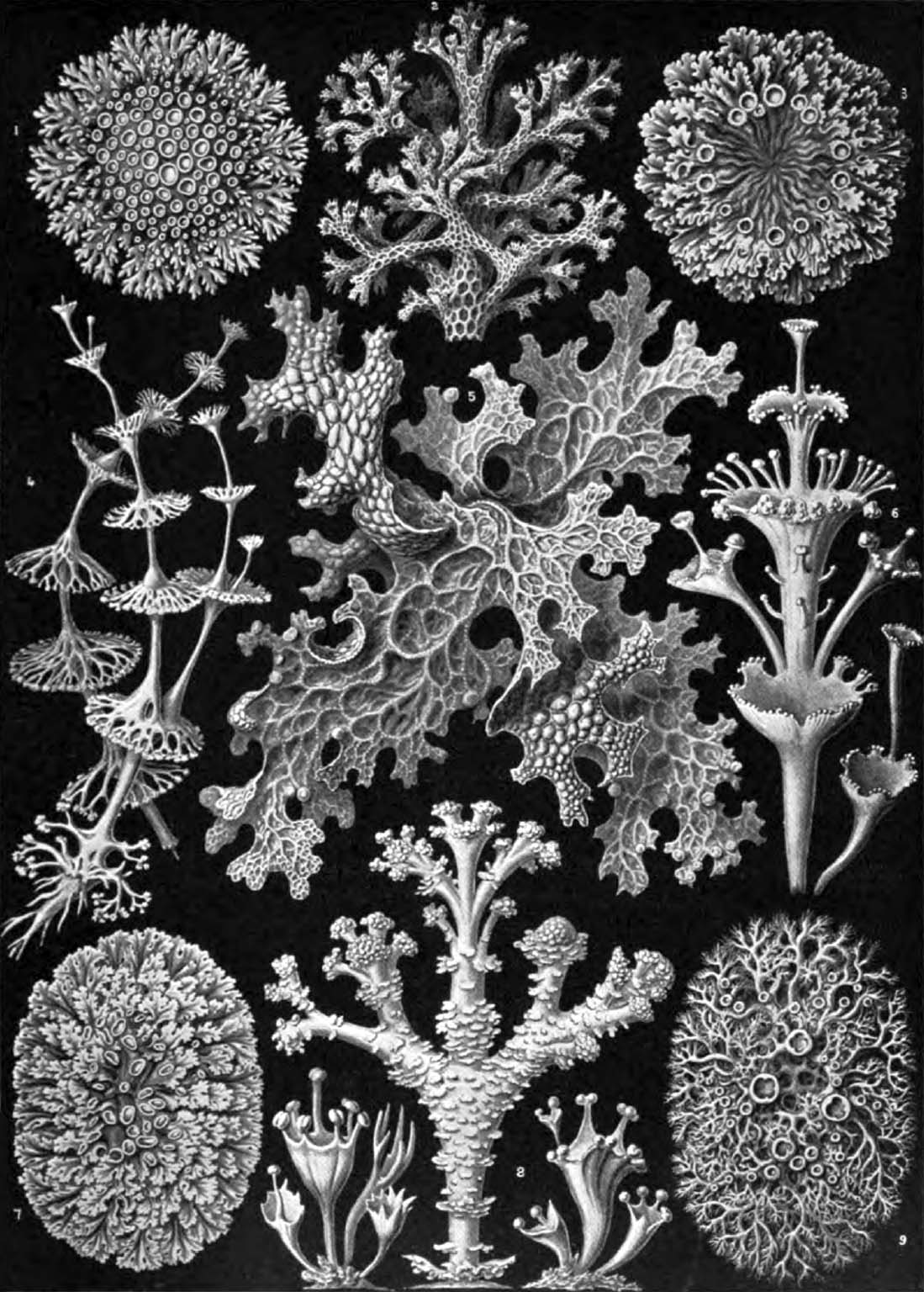
Pulchrocladia retipora is depicted in the top row, centre, of Ernst Haeckel's chart of lichens first published in his 1904 work Kunstformen der Natur ("Art Forms of Nature").

The complex net-like structures of Pulchrocladia retipora are known as fenestrations. Rosmarie Honegger referred to the thallus of this species as "likely to be among the most complex vegetative structures ever produced in the fungal kingdom". The appearance of the lichen has been described as "of considerable beauty resembling lace or coral". As a result, it has been used in floral decoration as architectural design. In his review of The Lichenologist journal's cover designs, German lichenologist Robert Lücking highlighted the design of volume 37, issue 1, from 2005, as particularly striking. This issue featured an image of Pulchrocladia retipora set against a blue-themed background.

=== Thallus development ===
Understanding the branching pattern of Pulchrocladia retipora is important for comprehending its unique developmental biology, and some studies have focused on this aspect. The first structure to emerge from the primary thallus is a meristem, which is a solid bundle of tissue comprising only fungal cells. Two adjacent meristem bundles give rise to the erect secondary thallus, the podetium. These bundles continue to split dichotomously, resulting in groups of three meristem bundles. Because the development of same-age bundles is unequal, the developmental differences become more pronounced as the meristem bundles grow farther apart. Splitting of the meristem is not synchronized between approximately same-age bundles; consequently, one meristem bundle or one side of the podetium can grow beyond the others. During its early development, the meristem of P. retipora undergoes slight bends and twists. These early changes become noticeable later in the form of varying angles between the meristem bundles. Perforations that are developmentally unrelated to the central perforation tend to occur early in the lichenised tissue distal to the meristem, while perforations that occur between meristem bundles happen later in development.

=== Resynthesis ===
The Pulchrocladia retipora lichen thallus has been successfully resynthesized from isolated mycobiont and photobiont under laboratory conditions. In these experiments, lichen primordia, consisting of fungal mycelia and enclosed algae appear after about one month. After four months, the cultures form small scales that are the starting units for the development of the complex hyphal network that becomes the thallus. Later, the scales differentiate into columns that grow together vertically to form a thin network, and more hyphae join and fuse together to strengthen and stabilize the network. Eventually, algae colonise the network prior to further development of the inner medulla and connecting of the fenestrations. In the laboratory, the entire process takes about two years.

=== Biomonitoring ===
Scientists at the University of Tasmania have used Pulchrocladia retipora as a bioindicator to identify how atmospheric nitrogen and sulphur deposition in Tasmania is affected by human pollution.
