= Carassea =

Scientific classification
- Kingdom: Fungi
- Division: Ascomycota
- Class: Lecanoromycetes
- Order: Lecanorales
- Family: Cladoniaceae
- Genus: Carassea; S.Stenroos (2002)
- Species: C. connexa

Binomial name
- Carassea connexa (Vain.) S.Stenroos (2002)

Synonyms
- Cladonia connexa Vain. (1887)

Genus of lichens

Carassea is a fungal genus in the family Cladoniaceae. The genus was circumscribed in 2002 by the Finnish lichenologist Soili Stenroos. A monotypic genus, Carassea contains the single species Carassea connexa, a fruticose lichen. This species, originally named Cladonia connexa, was first documented by Edvard August Vainio, who collected specimens from Minas Gerais, Brazil, in 1885, and published a description of the species in the first of his three-volume Monographia Cladoniarum universalis. The Cladoniaceae genera most closely related to Carassea include Pycnothelia and Metus.

== Taxonomy ==
Stenroos established Carassea after large-scale phylogenetic analyses of nuclear small-subunit rDNA (SSU rDNA) across the cladoniiform lichens showed that Cladonia (as then delimited) was not a natural, single lineage. In those phylogenetic trees, Cladonia connexa consistently grouped outside the core Cladonia clade and instead formed a clade with Pycnothelia (and, in the SSU analysis, with Metus) within a recircumscribed Cladoniaceae. A strict-consensus tree and a simplified cladogram of the source depict Carassea as sister to Pycnothelia and close to Metus.

The authors considered four options: sinking Pycnothelia and Metus into Cladonia, transferring connexa into Pycnothelia, doing nothing pending more data, or erecting a new genus. They rejected the first two because it would create ad hoc name changes without complete taxon sampling and because Pycnothelia is a small, morphologically uniform, temperate genus unlike the tall, densely branched, tropical connexa. They chose to recognise a new genus, Carassea, with the type and only species Carassea connexa (basionym Cladonia connexa, described by Vainio in 1887). The family Cladoniaceae was expressly recircumscribed to include Carassea along with Cladia, Cladonia, Heterodea, Metus, Pilophorus, Pycnothelia, Ramalea, and Thysanothecium.

== Description ==
The primary thallus (the basal crust or squamules present in many Cladonia relatives) is unknown for Carassea. The standing part of the lichen (the podetia—upright, stem-like branches) reach about 3–5 cm (1.2–2.0 in), occasionally to 15 cm (6 in). They are whitish to pale brown-grey and become strongly browned towards the tips. Branching is very regular and dichotomous (each branch forks into two equal parts), and the numerous branchlets frequently fuse together (anastomose), producing rounded heads and eventually large, continuous, net-like cushions. The podetia lack the cup-shaped tips (scyphi) seen in many Cladonia, and they also lack soredia and the small leaf-like scales (podetial squamules) that some relatives show. The outer surface may be smooth and glossy near the tips; a true cortex is absent, though there is a thin corticoid layer.

Asexual conidiomata occur at the tips of the finest branchlets; these are flask-like and black, with narrow, curved, colorless conidia about 12–15 × 0.5 μm. Sexual structures (apothecia) arise characteristically on the sides of the upper branchlets rather than at their ends: small knob-like primordia form just below the tips and develop into short-stalked, red-brown discs; mature ascospores were not seen in the available material. Thin-layer chromatography shows a consistent chemical pattern of the secondary metabolite compounds atranorin, lichesterinic acid, and protolichesterinic acid; medullary beta-orcinol depsides/depsidones are lacking in Carassea, as in its close relatives Pycnothelia and Metus. These structural and chemical traits, together with the distinctive branching and lateral apothecia, separate Carassea from look-alike members of Cladonia.

== Habitat and distribution ==
Carassea is a tropical lineage with a very restricted range in south-eastern Brazil. The type and other confirmed collections are from the Serra do Caraça area in Minas Gerais, including the type locality at about 1,500 m elevation (municipality of Catas Altas). Fieldwork in the 1990s confirmed that the species still occurs in the region, where its densely anastomosing branches form conspicuous cushions. No occurrences outside Brazil were reported in that work.
