= Alexander Clifford Beauglehole =

Australian botanist and naturalist

Alexander Clifford Beauglehole OAM
- Born: 26 August 1920; Gorae West, Victoria, Australia
- Died: 19 January 2002 (aged 81); Portland, Victoria, Australia
- Resting place: Portland, Victoria, Australia
- Other name: Cliff Beauglehole
- Spouse: Hilda Beauglehole née Oakley
- Children: 2
- Awards: Order of Australia Medal
- Scientific career
- Fields: Botany, conservation and ornithology.

Alexander Clifford "Cliff" Beauglehole OAM (26 August 1920 – 19 January 2002) was an Australian farmer, botanist, plant collector and naturalist.

== Life ==
Beauglehole was born in Gorae West, a locality near Portland in the Shire of Glenelg, of south-western Victoria, to the Beauglehole family, which were settlers from Cornwall, and arrived in the area in the nineteenth century. He attended Gorae state primary school but left after attaining his Qualifying Certificate to help his parents on the farm. He soon began making botanical surveys of the Portland area, as well as engaging in other natural history activities such as the study of Australian native bees, surveys of bone deposits in caves and the examination of beach-washed seabirds. By the 1940s, he had purchased the Gorae West farm from his parents and continued mixed farming there until 1968, when his family along with himself moved into Portland, in order to further his botanical career.

It is also during the 1940s that he discovered a new species of triggerplant, that is now commonly called Beauglehole's Trigger-plant; Stylidium beaugleholei. After 1968, Beauglehole was contracted to carry out botanical surveys in national parks and for the Victorian Land Conservation Council, which became his principal occupation. He published on a wide variety of natural history subjects, including the 13 volume The Distribution and Conservation of Vascular Plants in Victoria, written to cover the 73 study areas of the Victorian Conservation Council.

He died from complications after a stroke in 2002.

== Botanical Collections ==
Beauglehole was reported to have had a private herbarium of over 23,000 specimens, and his numbering scheme indicates that over his lifetime he collected over 95,000 specimens. The bulk of his plant collections (approximately 69,500 specimens) are held at the National Herbarium of Victoria, Royal Botanic Gardens Victoria, with approximately 7,000 specimens held by the Western Australian Herbarium. Roughly another 150 specimens from the Ballarat region are held at the Federation University Herbarium.

Museums Victoria holds 583 of zoological specimens of vertebrates and invertebrates, including type specimens, that were collected by Beauglehole in Victoria, Western Australia, New South Wales, South Australia, Northern Territory, and Queensland.

== Published major works ==
- Beauglehole, A.C. 1979. The Distribution and Conservation of native vascular plants in the Victorian Mallee. (Portland: Western Victorian Field Naturalists Clubs Association.)
- Beauglehole, A.C. 1980. The Distribution and Conservation of vascular plants in the Corangamite – Otway area, Victoria. (Portland: Western Victorian Field Naturalists Clubs Association.)
- Beauglehole, A.C. 1981a. The Distribution and Conservation of vascular plants in the Alpine area, Victoria. (Portland: Western Victorian Field Naturalists Clubs Association.)
- Beauglehole, A.C. 1981b. The Distribution and Conservation of vascular plants in the East Gippsland area, Victoria. (Portland: Western Victorian Field Naturalists Clubs Association.)
- Beauglehole, A.C. 1982. The Distribution and Conservation of vascular plants in the North Central area, Victoria. (Portland: Western Victorian Field Naturalists Clubs Association.)
- Beauglehole, A.C. 1983a. The Distribution and Conservation of vascular plants in the Melbourne area, Victoria. (Portland: Western Victorian Field Naturalists Clubs Association.)
- Beauglehole, A.C. 1983b. The Distribution and Conservation of vascular plants in the Ballarat area, Victoria. (Portland: Western Victorian Field Naturalists Clubs Association.)
- Beauglehole, A.C. 1984a. The Distribution and Conservation of vascular plants in the South Gippsland area, Victoria. (Portland: Western Victorian Field Naturalists Clubs Association.)
- Beauglehole, A.C. 1984b. The Distribution and Conservation of vascular plants in South West Victoria. (Portland: Western Victorian Field Naturalists Clubs Association.)
- Beauglehole, A.C. 1985. The Distribution and Conservation of vascular plants in the Gippsland Lakes Hinterland area, Victoria. (Portland: Western Victorian Field Naturalists Clubs Association.)
- Beauglehole, A.C. 1986. The Distribution and Conservation of vascular plants in the Murray Valley area, Victoria. (Portland: A.C. and H.M. Beauglehole.)
- Beauglehole, A.C. 1987. The Distribution and Conservation of vascular plants in the Wimmera area, Victoria. (Portland: A.C. and H.M. Beauglehole.)
- Beauglehole, A.C. 1988. The Distribution and Conservation of vascular plants in the North East area, Victoria. (Portland: A.C. and H.M. Beauglehole.)

== Honours and awards ==
In 1971, Beauglehole was awarded the Australian Natural History Medallion by the Field Naturalists Club of Victoria, becoming an Honorary Member of the Field Naturalists Club of Victoria in 1982. In 1984 he was awarded the Medal of the Order of Australia for his services to "botany, conservation, and ornithology" by the then-Prince Charles

== Legacy ==
The following plants, algae, and insect species have been named in his honour:

=== Algae ===
- Helminthocladia beaugleholei Womersley
- Nitella tasmanica var. beaugleholii R.D.Wood

=== Lichen ===
- Heterodea beaugleholei Filson

=== Moss ===
- Phascum beaugleholei I.G.Stone

=== Vascular Plants ===
- Sclerolaena beaugleholei (Ising) A.J.Scott
- Caladenia beaugleholei D.L.Jones, now a synonym of Caladenia flavovirens G.W.Carr.
- Epilobium brunnescens subsp. beaugleholei K.R.West & P.H.Raven
- Lobelia beaugleholei Albr.
- Ornduffia umbricola var. beaugleholei (Aston) Tippery & Les
- Prasophyllum beaugleholei Nicholls, now a synonym of Genoplesium nudum (Hook.f.) D.L.Jones & M.A.Clem.
- Solanum beaugleholei D.E.Symon
- Stylidium beaugleholei J.H.Willis
- Utricularia beaugleholei R.J.Gassin

=== Bees ===
- Exoneura (Brevineura) cliffordiella Rayment
- Hylaeus cliffordiellus Rayment
- Megachile cliffordi Rayment

=== Wasp ===
- Sericophorus cliffordi Rayment
