= Pulchrocladia ferdinandii =

Scientific classification
- Kingdom: Fungi
- Division: Ascomycota
- Class: Lecanoromycetes
- Order: Lecanorales
- Family: Cladoniaceae
- Genus: Pulchrocladia
- Species: P. ferdinandii

Binomial name
- Pulchrocladia ferdinandii (Müll.Arg.) S.Stenroos, Pino-Bodas & Ahti (2018)

Synonyms
- Cladia ferdinandii (Müll.Arg.) Filson (1970); Cladonia ferdinandii Müll.Arg. (1882); Cladonia retipora var. ferdinandii (Müll.Arg.) Vain. (1887); Clathrina ferdinandii (Müll.Arg.) Müll.Arg. (1883)

Species of lichen-forming fungus

Pulchrocladia ferdinandii is a species of lichen in the family Cladoniaceae. It was first formally described as Cladonia ferdinandii by Swiss lichenologist Johannes Müller Argoviensis in 1882. The specific epithet honours German-Australian botanist Ferdinand von Mueller, who collected the type specimen near Esperance, Western Australia. Rex Filson transferred the taxon to Cladia in 1970. In 2018, it was transferred to the newly circumscribed genus Pulchrocladia.

The lichen makes creamy-white to yellow pseudopodetia that are up to 15 cm (6 in) tall. Secondary compounds occurring in the lichen include atranorin, ursolic acid, and usnic acid. Pulchrocladia ferdinandii has an Australian distribution. It has been recorded from Australian Capital Territory, New South Wales, Queensland, South Australia, and Western Australia.
