= Notocladonia =

Scientific classification
- Kingdom: Fungi
- Division: Ascomycota
- Class: Lecanoromycetes
- Order: Lecanorales
- Family: Cladoniaceae
- Genus: Notocladonia; S.Hammer (2003)

Type species
- Notocladonia cochleata (Müll.Arg.) S.Hammer (2003)

Species
- N. cochleata N. undulata

Genus of lichens

Notocladonia is a genus of two Australasian species of lichen-forming fungi in the family Cladoniaceae. The genus was established in 2003 by Samuel Hammer to accommodate Australasian species previously misplaced in the neotropical genus Ramalea. Notocladonia species are distinguished by their spore-bearing discs (apothecia) that form at the tips of scale-like lobes or short stalks, rather than beneath the thallus as in Ramalea. Both species occur in temperate regions of southeastern Australia and New Zealand, typically growing on thin soils in open habitats.

== Taxonomy ==
Notocladonia was introduced by Samuel Hammer in 2003 to resolve long-standing uncertainty over the placement of certain Australasian species that had been sitting uneasily in the mainly Neotropical genus Ramalea. In his revision, Hammer placed the endemic Ramalea cochleata into the new genus as Notocladonia cochleata and described a second Australasian species, N. undulata; N. cochleata was designated the type species. His treatment followed a nineteenth- and twentieth-century debate about whether Ramalea belonged within the Cladoniaceae at all, a debate that various authors addressed with differing conclusions.

Hammer argued that Ramalea in the strict sense (sensu stricto) is distinct from Notocladonia and should be excluded from the Cladoniaceae. The key practical difference he drew is where and how the spore-bearing discs (apothecia) develop: in Notocladonia they form at the tips of the squamules or short podetia (like other Cladoniaceae) whereas in Ramalea the apothecia occur beneath the lichenised squamules and mature into a peculiar flattened, "butterfly-like" shape. To stabilise usage of Ramalea, he also designated a lectotype for its type species, R. tribulosa.

In discussing relationships within the family, Hammer noted morphological and chemical affinities between Notocladonia and the Australasian genus Cladia (e.g., similar branching and divaricatic acid chemistry), and suggested that such patterns point to a Southern Hemisphere focus of diversity in the Cladoniaceae. The name itself reflects this geography: noto- from Greek for "southern".

A five-locus phylogeny of Cladoniaceae places Notocladonia (sampled as N. cochleata) in a clade with Thysanothecium within an expanded Cladia lineage. To resolve paraphyly in Cladia sensu lato (in the broad sense), the study segregated Pulchrocladia and Rexiella from Cladia, while retaining Notocladonia and Thysanothecium as separate genera based on their contrasting morphology (presence of a squamulose primary thallus and true podetia). In a single-marker SSU analysis the exact placement of Notocladonia was equivocal, but concatenated analyses resolved it within Cladoniaceae.

== Description ==
Notocladonia forms a primary thallus made of small scale-like lobes (squamules) that are often blistered (bullate) or shingled and may stand somewhat erect. The upper surface is corticate (with a firm outer skin), while the underside lacks rhizines (root-like attachment filaments) and shows vein-like bands of aggregated hyphae; soredia (powdery propagules) are absent. Margins of the squamules commonly put out podetium-like proliferations: short, stalk-like outgrowths that can develop into the characteristic uprights of the genus. The partner alga is trebouxioid (unicellular green algae), and the thallus contains the secondary metabolites (lichen products) usnic and divaricatic acids.

The podetia (upright outgrowths) range from flattened to tubular. At their tips, the spore-producing tissue (hymenium) forms apothecia that are typically wavy or even branching, and these may occur singly or in small clusters; splitting of the apothecial tissue during development is common. A practical way to recognise the genus is that its apothecia are borne at the apices of squamules or podetia, rather than beneath the lichenized squamules as in the superficially similar neotropical genus Ramalea.

== Habitat and distribution ==
Notocladonia occurs in temperate to cool-temperate settings, typically starting on thin soil over organic substrates and later persisting on very shallow mineral soil or exposed hardpan in open sites. The genus is Australasian, with records from south-eastern Australia and New Zealand.
