= Heterodea =

Scientific classification
- Kingdom: Fungi
- Division: Ascomycota
- Class: Lecanoromycetes
- Order: Lecanorales
- Family: Cladoniaceae
- Genus: Heterodea; Nyl.

Type species
- Heterodea muelleri (Hampe) Nyl. (1868)

Species
- H. beaugleholei H. muelleri

Genus of lichen-forming fungi

Heterodea is a small genus of lichen-forming fungi in the family Cladoniaceae. It comprises two species. The two species form flat, leafy thalli and grow on soil, rock, and plant debris in open habitats in southern Australia, where they can resemble members of the related genus Cladia. The genus has had a complicated taxonomic history, having been variously merged with and separated from the related genus Cladia as molecular studies have progressively clarified the relationships within the Cladoniaceae.

== Taxonomy ==
Heterodea was erected by William Nylander in 1867 to accommodate the Australasian lichen that Ernst Hampe had first described as Sticta muelleri in 1852. Nylander had briefly transferred the species to Platysma (1860) and then to Cladonia (1861) before recognising it as distinct and placing it with the "Cladoniei". Rex Filson's 1978 revision recognised two species, H. muelleri and the newly described H. beaugleholei, and argued that the combination of a foliose (leafy) thallus with an cortex-lacking lower surface, nipple-like pycnidia on the margins, and apothecia (fruiting bodies) at the lobe tips justified treating the genus in its own monotypic family, Heterodeaceae, given the then-unsettled comparisons with Parmeliaceae and Cladoniaceae.

A molecular three-locus phylogeny (ITS, nrLSU, mtSSU) later showed that Heterodea is embedded within the predominantly fruticose genus Cladia, with the combined Cladia + Heterodea clade strongly supported. Parnmen and colleagues also documented matching anatomy and chemistry—paraplectenchymatous upper cortex, a two-layered medulla with a pigmented inner zone, and overlapping usnic/divaricatic/diffractaic acid chemosyndromes—and interpreted the flat Heterodea thallus as a derived, flattened pseudopodetium consistent with origins within Cladia. Topology tests rejected treating Cladia and Heterodea as separate monophyletic genera, and the authors suggested uniting them in a single genus.

That same year, a formal nomenclatural proposal in Taxon moved to conserve Cladia (typified by C. aggregata) against the earlier Heterodea (typified by H. muelleri), so that if the two were treated as being in the same genus, the long-used name Cladia would be retained. The proposal argued from the new phylogeny and from prevailing usage—Cladia had about 14 species with broad southern-hemisphere distribution, whereas Heterodea comprised two Australasian species—so conservation would prevent disruptive name changes.

A subsequent five-locus family-wide analysis reversed course at the generic rank: Heterodea was recovered as a distinct, well-supported lineage within Cladoniaceae and explicitly resurrected as a separate genus. In that framework, Cladia (in the strict sense) proved paraphyletic and was split, with new segregate genera (Pulchrocladia, and Rexia, which later became Rexiella) and Heterodea forming a clade near Notocladonia and Thysanothecium. Under this modern treatment Heterodea is placed unambiguously in Cladoniaceae rather than a separate family.

== Species ==
- Heterodea beaugleholei Filson (1978)
- Heterodea muelleri (Hampe) Nyl. (1868)
