= Filson =

Filson may refer to:

- Filson (company), an outdoor clothing maker in Seattle, Washington
- Filson, Illinois
- Filson Nunatak, Antarctica
- The Filson Historical Society, in Louisville, Kentucky, formerly the Filson Club

People with the name:

- Filson Young (1876–1938), journalist
- Al W. Filson (1857-1925), American actor
- John Filson (1747–1788), Kentucky explorer
- Minnie Agnes Filson (1898–1971), Australian poet
- Pete Filson (born 1958), Major League Baseball pitcher
- Rex Bertram Filson (born 1930), Australian lichenologist
