= Cladia beaugleholei =

Scientific classification
- Kingdom: Fungi
- Division: Ascomycota
- Class: Lecanoromycetes
- Order: Lecanorales
- Family: Cladoniaceae
- Genus: Cladia
- Species: C. beaugleholei

Binomial name
- Cladia beaugleholei (Filson) Parnmen & Lumbsch

Synonyms
- Heterodea beaugleholei Filson

Species of lichen

Cladia beaugleholei is a lichen in the family Cladoniaceae found in Australia. It was first described as Heterodea beaugleholei in 1978 by Rex Filson, from a specimen collected from forest soil in New South Wales. The species epithet honours Alexander Clifford Beauglehole. It was reassigned to the genus Cladia by Sittiporn Parnmen and H. Thorsten Lumbsch in 2012.

Under the Nature Conservation Act 1992 of Queensland, its Queensland conservation status is of "Least Concern".
