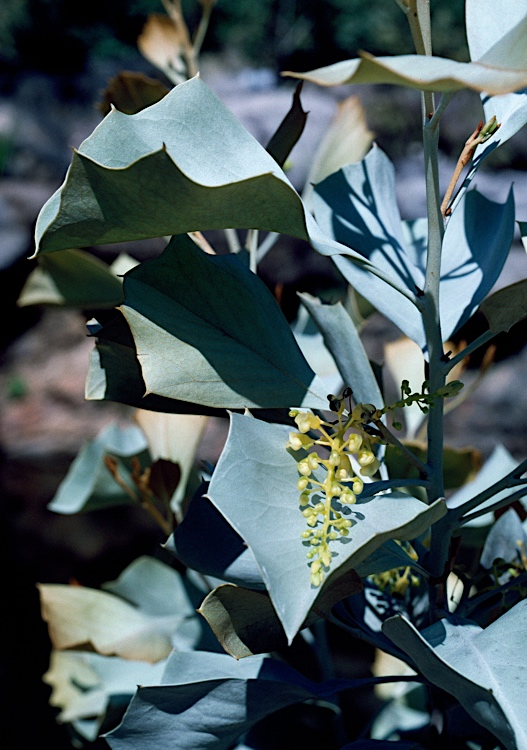
- In the Royal Botanic Garden, Sydney

Scientific classification
- Kingdom: Plantae
- Clade: Tracheophytes
- Clade: Angiosperms
- Clade: Eudicots
- Order: Proteales
- Family: Proteaceae
- Genus: Grevillea
- Species: G. velutinella

Binomial name
- Grevillea velutinella McGill.

= Grevillea velutinella =

Species of shrub endemic to Western Australia

Grevillea velutinella is species of flowering plant in the family Proteaceae and is endemic to northern Western Australia. It is a shrub with broadly egg-shaped leaves in outline, sometimes with 2 to 7 teeth, and down-turned, often branched clusters of yellowish-green to lemon or cream-coloured flowers.

== Description ==
Grevillea velutinella is an erect shrub that typically grows to a height of 1.2–4 m (3 ft 11 in – 13 ft 1 in). Its leaves are broadly egg-shaped in outline, with the narrower end towards the base, 50–120 mm (2.0–4.7 in) long and 35–80 mm (1.4–3.1 in) wide, sometimes with 2 to 7 teeth near the base of the leaf. Both sides of the leaf are velvety-hairy. The flowers are usually arranged in leaf axils on a down-turned flowering stems with up to 5 branches, each branch with more or less conical clusters on a rachis 40–110 mm (1.6–4.3 in) long, each flower on a pedicel 7–10 mm (0.28–0.39 in) long. The flowers are yellowish-green to lemon or cream-coloured, the pistil 6.5–9 mm (0.26–0.35 in) long. Flowering occurs from March to July, and the fruit is a glabrous follicle 18–19 mm (0.71–0.75 in) long.

== Taxonomy ==
Grevillea velutinella was first formally described in 1986 by Donald McGillivray in his book, New Names in Grevillea (Proteaceae) from specimens collected by Alexander Clifford Beauglehole and Geoffrey William Carr, near the outflow of Lake Argyle in 1986. The specific epithet (velutinella) means "somewhat velvety", referring to the leaves.

== Distribution ==
This grevillea grows in open shrubland or woodland, usually in rocky places and usually on sandstone or quartzite slopes and occurs between Wyndham, El Questro Wilderness Park and Bedford Downs Station in the Central Kimberley, Ord Victoria Plain and Victoria Bonaparte bioregions of northern Western Australia.

== Conservation status ==
Grevillea velutinella is listed as "not threatened" by the Government of Western Australia Department of Biodiversity, Conservation and Attractions.

== See also ==
- List of Grevillea species
