= Mount Burnett =

Mount Burnett may refer to:

- Mount Burnett (Antarctica)
- Mount Burnett (New Zealand)
- Mount Burnett, Victoria in Australia
- Mount Burnett, Queensland in Australia 18.3197°S 146.1997°E
