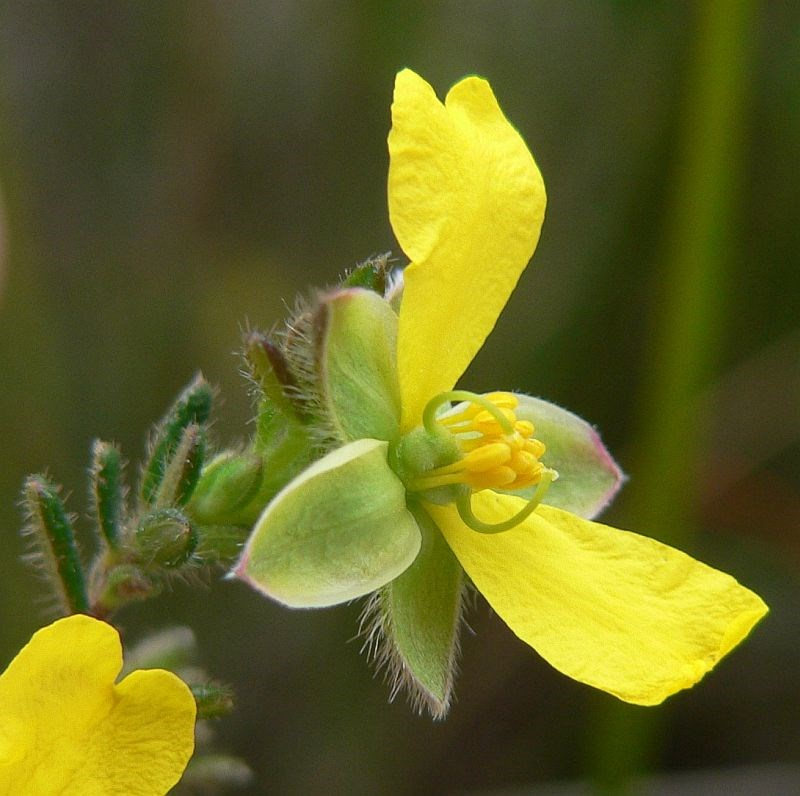
- In Beowa National Park

Scientific classification
- Kingdom: Plantae
- Clade: Tracheophytes
- Clade: Angiosperms
- Clade: Eudicots
- Order: Dilleniales
- Family: Dilleniaceae
- Genus: Hibbertia
- Species: H. dispar

Binomial name
- Hibbertia dispar Toelken

= Hibbertia dispar =

Flowering plant of Eastern Australia

Hibbertia dispar is a species of flowering plant in the family Dilleniaceae and is endemic to eastern Australia. It is a prostrate to low-lying shrublet with hairy, linear leaves and yellow flowers arranged on the ends of branchlets, usually with four to six stamens in a cluster on one side of two carpels.

== Description ==
Hibbertia dispar is a prostrate to low-lying shrublet that typically grows up to 50 cm (20 in) high with hairy branches up to 30 cm (12 in) long. The leaves are linear, 2.5–6.5 mm (0.098–0.256 in) long and 1.0–1.3 mm (0.039–0.051 in) wide on a petiole 0.2–0.6 mm (0.0079–0.0236 in) long. The flowers are arranged on the ends of branches and sessile, or on a peduncle up to 6 mm (0.24 in) long. There are up to three linear to lance-shaped bracts 1–2.4 mm (0.039–0.094 in) long. The outer sepals lobes are 5.4–5.8 mm (0.21–0.23 in) long and the inner lobes 5.2–5.6 mm (0.20–0.22 in) long. The five petals are lance-shaped to egg-shaped with the narrower end towards the base, yellow and 5–7.7 mm (0.20–0.30 in) long. There are usually four to six stamens arranged in a bundle on one side of the two (rarely three) hairy carpels, each carpel usually with four ovules. Flowering mainly occurs from September to November.

== Taxonomy ==
Hibbertia dispar was first formally described in 2013 by Hellmut R. Toelken in the Journal of the Adelaide Botanic Gardens from specimens collected by Alexander Clifford Beauglehole near Boisdale in 1973. The specific epithet (dispar) means "unlike", referring to the species' unusual characteristics.

== Distribution and habitat ==
This hibbertia grows in a range of habitats but often on rocky slopes or along creeks. It is found on the Central Tablelands of New South Wales, in Gippsland, Victoria and on some Tasmanian islands.

== See also ==
- List of Hibbertia species
