= Gymnoderma =

Scientific classification
- Kingdom: Fungi
- Division: Ascomycota
- Class: Lecanoromycetes
- Order: Lecanorales
- Family: Cladoniaceae
- Genus: Gymnoderma; Nyl. (1860)

Type species
- Gymnoderma coccocarpum Nyl. (1863)

Species
- G. coccocarpum G. favosum G. insulare G. sinuatum

Synonyms
- Gymnodermatomyces Cif. & Tomas. (1953)

Genus of lichens

Gymnoderma is a genus of lichen-forming fungi in the family Cladoniaceae. Originally established in 1860 by the Finnish lichenologist William Nylander, this small genus is characterised by forming mats of small, yellow-green scales dotted with spherical brown fruiting bodies. The genus is distinguished from related lichens by a unique microscopic feature: its spore-containing structures (asci) turn deep blue when stained with iodine, which is uncommon among members of the Cladoniaceae.

== Taxonomy ==
The genus was circumscribed by the Finnish lichenologist William Nylander in 1860. Nylander assigned Gymnoderma coccocarpum as the type species in 1869; this species was originally collected from the Himalayas. Historical confusion affected allied names: Edvard Vainio's genus Baeoderma (type: Baeoderma madagascareum, based on Nylander's Heterodea madagascarea) has been overlooked in some sources but is referable to Gymnoderma. Re-examination of Mascarenes material from Mauritius and Réunion shows that Nylander's African taxon is the same species as G. coccocarpum, extending Gymnoderma to Africa; this synonymy rests on morphology, as matching DNA sequences were not available for those island specimens. Earlier misplacements, for example confusion with Bunodophoron madagascareum, have been clarified.

Multi-locus phylogenies of Cladoniaceae place Gymnoderma in a clade close to Carassea and Pycnothelia, sister to the much larger genus Cladonia. Within the Cladoniaceae, the key diagnostic for Gymnoderma is its entirely amyloid ascus (the spore sac), a feature repeatedly reported and used to delimit the genus.

== Description ==
The thallus forms overlapping squamules (small, leaf-like scales) with a green-yellow upper surface and a white lower surface; the margins are crenate (finely scalloped). Podetia (the upright stalks that many Cladonia relatives develop) are absent or very short in Gymnoderma, and when present they are solid and arise at the squamule margins. Fruiting bodies (apothecia) are common; they are pale brown, more or less spherical, and sessile (sitting directly on the thallus without a stalk). In practical terms, a mat of yellow-green scales dotted with small brown balls is a typical field appearance for the genus.

Microscopically, the ascus is entirely amyloid (meaning it turns a deep blue when stained with iodine solution) which is an uncommon state in Cladoniaceae and helps separate Gymnoderma from superficially similar genera.

== Species ==
- Gymnoderma coccocarpum Nyl. (1869)
- Gymnoderma favosum Hoffm. (1811)
- Gymnoderma insulare Yoshim. & Sharp (1968)
- Gymnoderma sinuatum Humb. (1793)

Some species once classified in Gymnoderma have since been transferred to other genera. These include:

- Gymnoderma lineare (A.Evans) Yoshim. & Sharp (1968) = Cetradonia linearis
- Gymnoderma melacarpum (F.Wilson) Yoshim. (1973) = Neophyllis melacarpa
- Gymnoderma rugosum (Pers.) Hoffm. (1811) = Stereum rugosum
