= Cladia inflata =

Scientific classification
- Kingdom: Fungi
- Division: Ascomycota
- Class: Lecanoromycetes
- Order: Lecanorales
- Family: Cladoniaceae
- Genus: Cladia
- Species: C. inflata

Binomial name
- Cladia inflata (F.Wilson) D.J.Galloway (1977)

Synonyms
- Cladonia aggregata f. inflata F.Wilson (1893)

Species of lichen

Cladia inflata is a species of fruticose lichen in the family Cladoniaceae. This lichen forms densely interwoven, spreading mats up to 5 centimetres high, with swollen, glossy branches that vary from pale yellow-brown to olive-brown in colour. It grows on peaty or sandy soil in high-rainfall areas, typically in areas exceeding 3000 millimetres of annual precipitation, and is found across Tasmania, south-eastern mainland Australia, and New Zealand. The species is characterized by its inflated branches that are broader at the forks, a feature that distinguishes it from closely related species in the Cladia aggregata complex.

== Taxonomy ==
The species was first scientifically described in 1893 as a form of Cladonia aggregata by Francis Wilson. In his original description, Wilson distinguished the form inflata by its branches and branchlets (ramules) being much inflated, measuring up to 3 mm in diameter, but broader at the forks (furcations), and noted that it occurred sterile. He recorded the taxon from earth and rocks at South Esk at Launceston and Maria Island in Tasmania. David Galloway promoted it to full species status in 1977. Galloway's treatment recognised the distinctive morphological characteristics of the inflated, decumbent thallus as sufficiently distinct to warrant specific status within the genus Cladia, separating it from the C. aggregata species complex.

== Description ==
Cladia inflata forms densely interwoven, spreading clumps or mats that are decumbent at the base, typically reaching 50 mm high and 4–6 mm wide. The thallus shows repeated dichotomous branching with branches tapering rather abruptly at their tips. The surface is texture is glossy to faintly wavy (undulate), and wrinkled or dimpled. It varies in colour from pale yellow-brown to olive-brown or reddish brown, and takes on a pale greenish colouration in deep shade. The angles where branches fork (axils) lack holes and are not pinched or narrowed, with branches typically diverging smoothly rather than at sharp angles, especially on the upper surface. Perforations, when present, are round to oval and measure 0.2–2 mm wide. The medullary cavity is white and tomentose throughout.

Reproductive stalks (fertile pseudopodetia) are rare and grow horizontally along the ground (decumbent). They are nearly identical to non-reproductive stalks but have slightly more branching and develop small holes near their tips. Apothecia develop apically on short branchlets and are mostly solitary or occur in groups of 2–3. They measure up to 0.2 mm wide and usually proliferate in 2–3 compressed tiers. Ascospores measure 8–10 × 3–4 micrometres (μm). The pseudopodetia are usually sterile (lacking apothecia); they are made of internally erect, stout, sterile hyphae and very deformed, weakly amyloid or non-amyloid asci. Conidia are common, occurring singly or in pairs at the tips of sterile and fertile pseudopodetia, and occasionally also laminally. The conidia are threadlike (filiform) and hooked (falcate) with blunt tips, measuring 5–6 × 0.6–0.8 μm.

The chemistry of C. inflata includes fumarprotocetraric acid, succinoprotocetraric acid (variably), protocetraric acid, and physodialic acid as medullary compounds, with spot test reactions of K−, KC−, C−, Pd+ (red) and UV−.

== Habitat and distribution ==
Cladia inflata is widely distributed across Tasmania, mainland Australia, and New Zealand. In Australia, the species occurs in Tasmania, south-eastern regions, and alpine areas of the mainland. It is found at high-elevation sites, growing in areas with very high rainfall exceeding 3000 mm per annum. The lichen is often found growing on peaty or sandy soil in association with other species of Cladia, as well as Cladonia southlandica and Siphula decumbens. Detailed distribution records have been documented within Tasmania.

The species is most readily recognised in the field when well-developed. It has been studied extensively through both laboratory and field observations, revealing that it inhabits the broadest ecological niche within its segregate group. C. inflata displays the widest ecological amplitude (the range of survivable environmental conditions) among members of its complex, occurring from lowland to alpine altitudes and growing in habitats ranging from relatively open sclerophyll woodlands to blanket bogs of south-western Tasmania.
