= Pulchrocladia corallaizon =

Scientific classification
- Domain: Eukaryota
- Kingdom: Fungi
- Division: Ascomycota
- Class: Lecanoromycetes
- Order: Lecanorales
- Family: Cladoniaceae
- Genus: Pulchrocladia
- Species: P. corallaizon

Binomial name
- Pulchrocladia corallaizon (F.Wilson ex Filson) S.Stenroos, Pino-Bodas & Ahti (2018)

Synonyms
- Cladia corallaizon F.Wilson ex Filson (1970); Cladonia arcuata (Stirt.) Rogers (1982); Cladonia retipora f. arcuata (Stirt.) Zahlbr. (1927); Cladonia retipora var. arcuata Stirt. (1888)

Species of lichen

Pulchrocladia corallaizon is a species of lichen in the family Cladoniaceae. It was first formally described as Cladia corallaizon. The specific epithet corallaizon, modified from Greek, means "ever-living coral". In 2018, it was transferred to the newly circumscribed genus Pulchrocladia.

The lichen makes pale grey to greenish-grey pseudopodetia that are up to 5 cm (2 in) tall. Secondary compounds occurring in the lichen include atranorin, protolichesterinic acid, ursolic acid, and usnic acid. The distribution of Pulchrocladia corallaizon is limited to South Australia and Western Australia.
