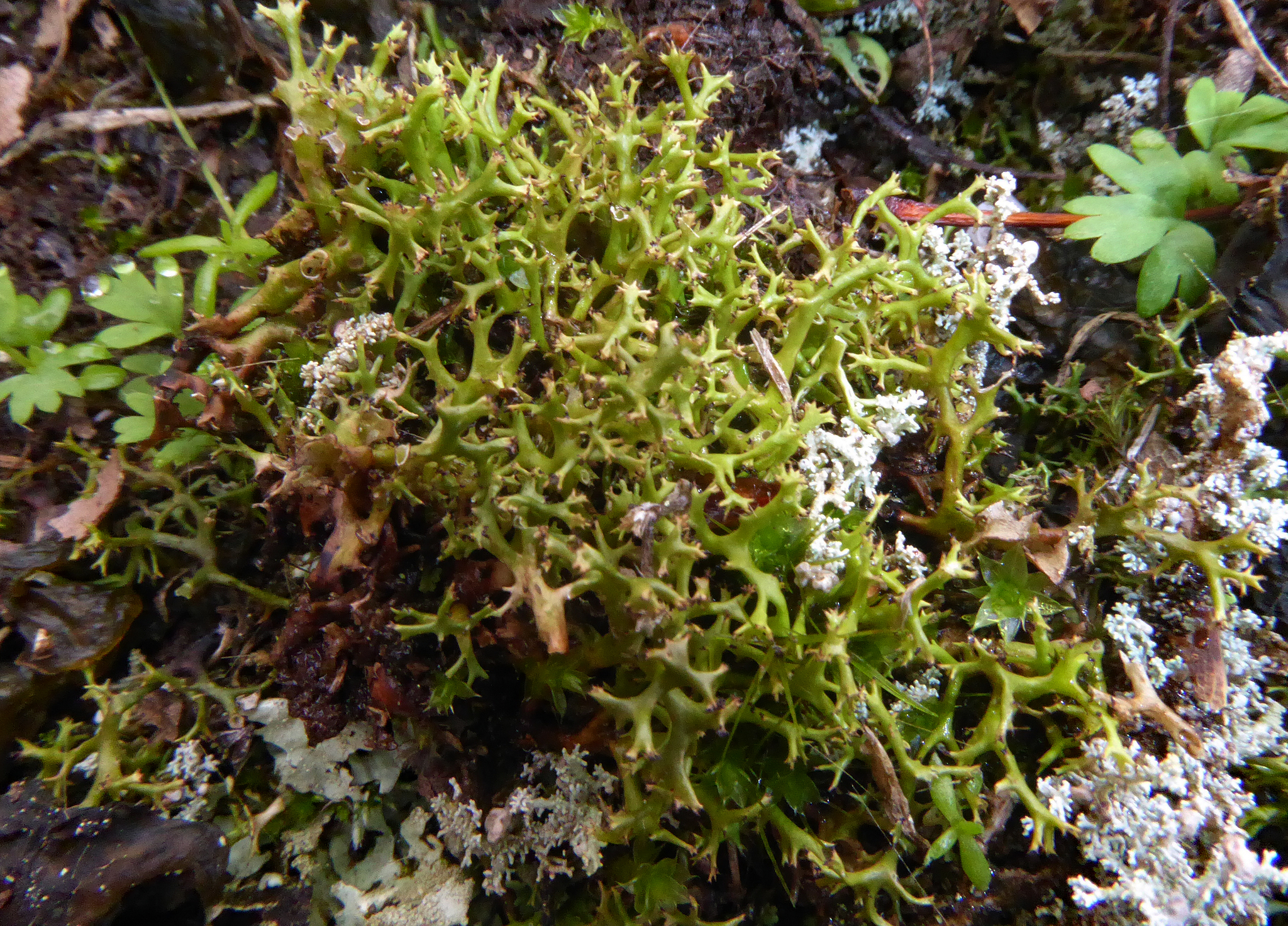

Conservation status
- Nationally Vulnerable (NZ TCS)

Scientific classification
- Kingdom: Fungi
- Division: Ascomycota
- Class: Lecanoromycetes
- Order: Lecanorales
- Family: Cladoniaceae
- Genus: Cladia
- Species: C. blanchonii

Binomial name
- Cladia blanchonii Parnmen & Lumbsch

= Cladia blanchonii =

Species of lichen

Cladia blanchonii, known by the common name Dan's Cladia, is a species of lichen in the family Cladoniaceae. Found in Australia and New Zealand, the species was first described in 2013 by Sittiporn Parnmen and Helge Thorsten Lumbsch, who named the species after New Zealand botanist Dan Blanchon.

== Description ==
The species has inflated and tapered sterile pseudopodetia, is pale yellow to green-brown in colour on its surface, and is glossy in appearance.

== Taxonomy ==
The species was first described by Sittiporn Parnmen and Helge Thorsten Lumbsch in 2013, as a part of a phylogenetic analysis of Cladia aggregata and related species. The holotype was collected in October 2011 by Dan Blanchon from the Unitec Institute of Technology campus in Mount Albert, Auckland, New Zealand, and is held in the herbarium of the Auckland War Memorial Museum. The species was named after Blanchon.

== Ecology ==
The species is both saxicolous (living on rock) and terricolous (living on soil).

== Distribution ==
The species is widespread but rarely found across New Zealand including the Chatham Islands, and is also found in Tasmania and south-eastern Australia, typically found on mossy soil and rocky outcrops.

== Gallery ==
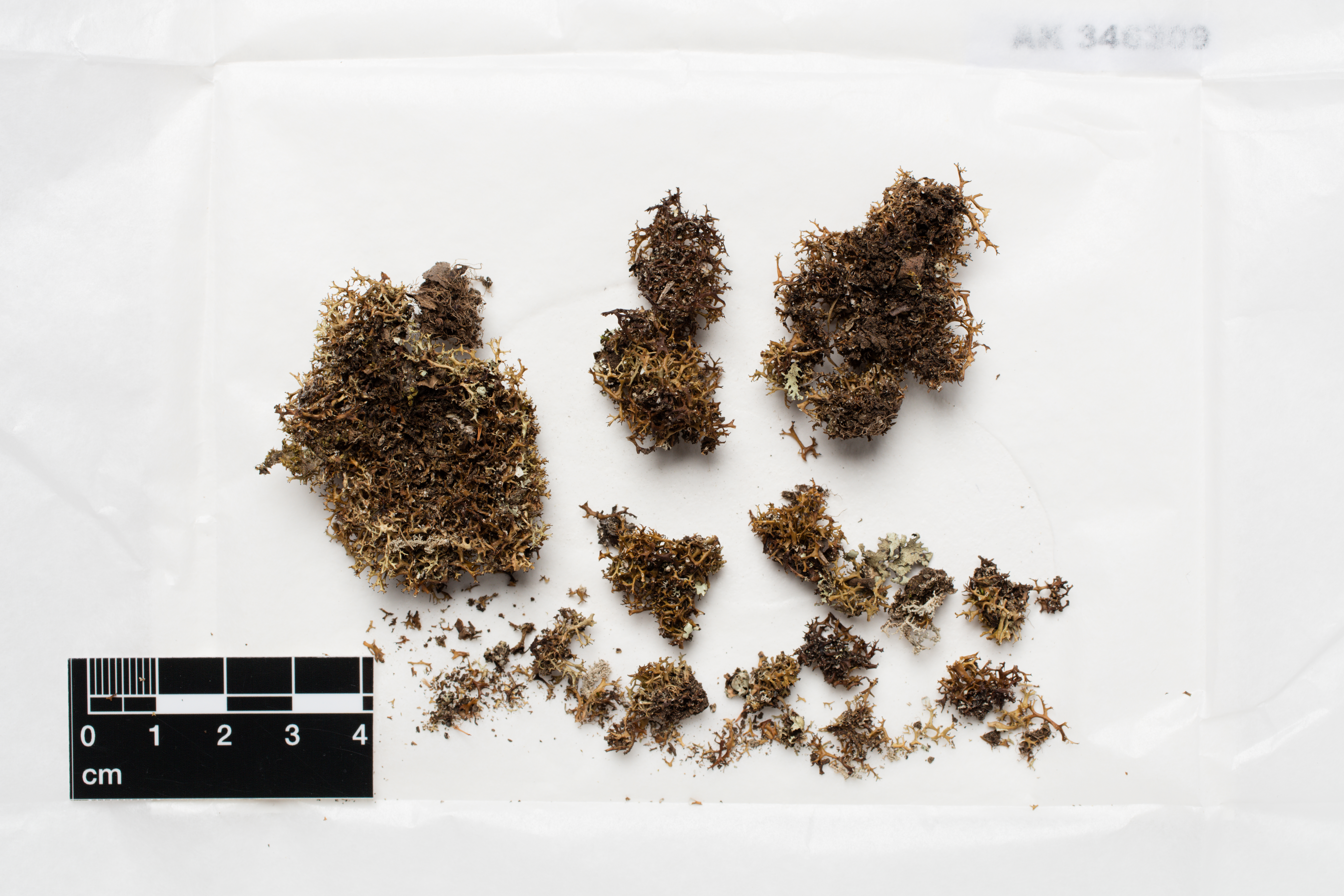
Holotype

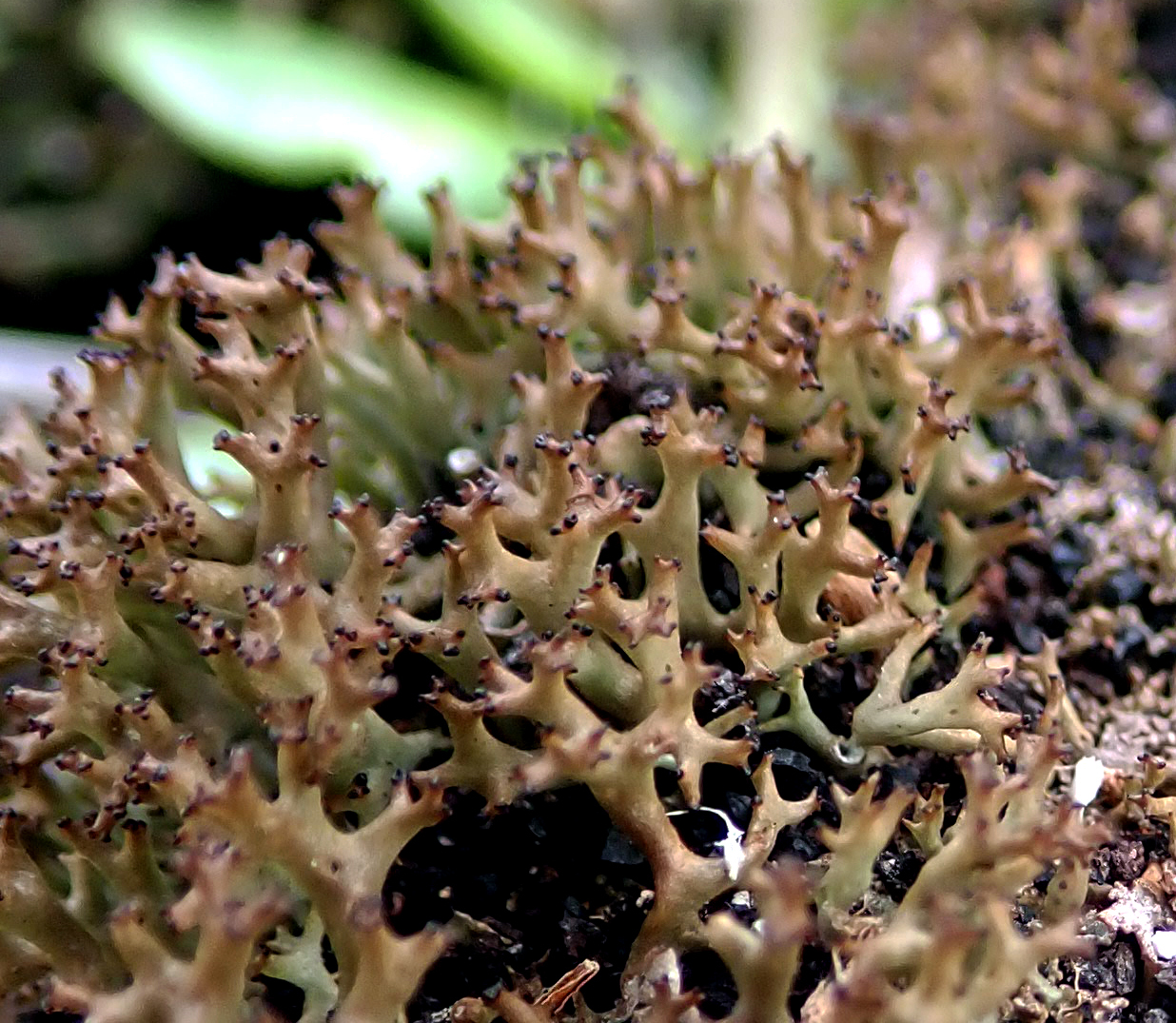
Cladia blanchonii in the Chatham Islands

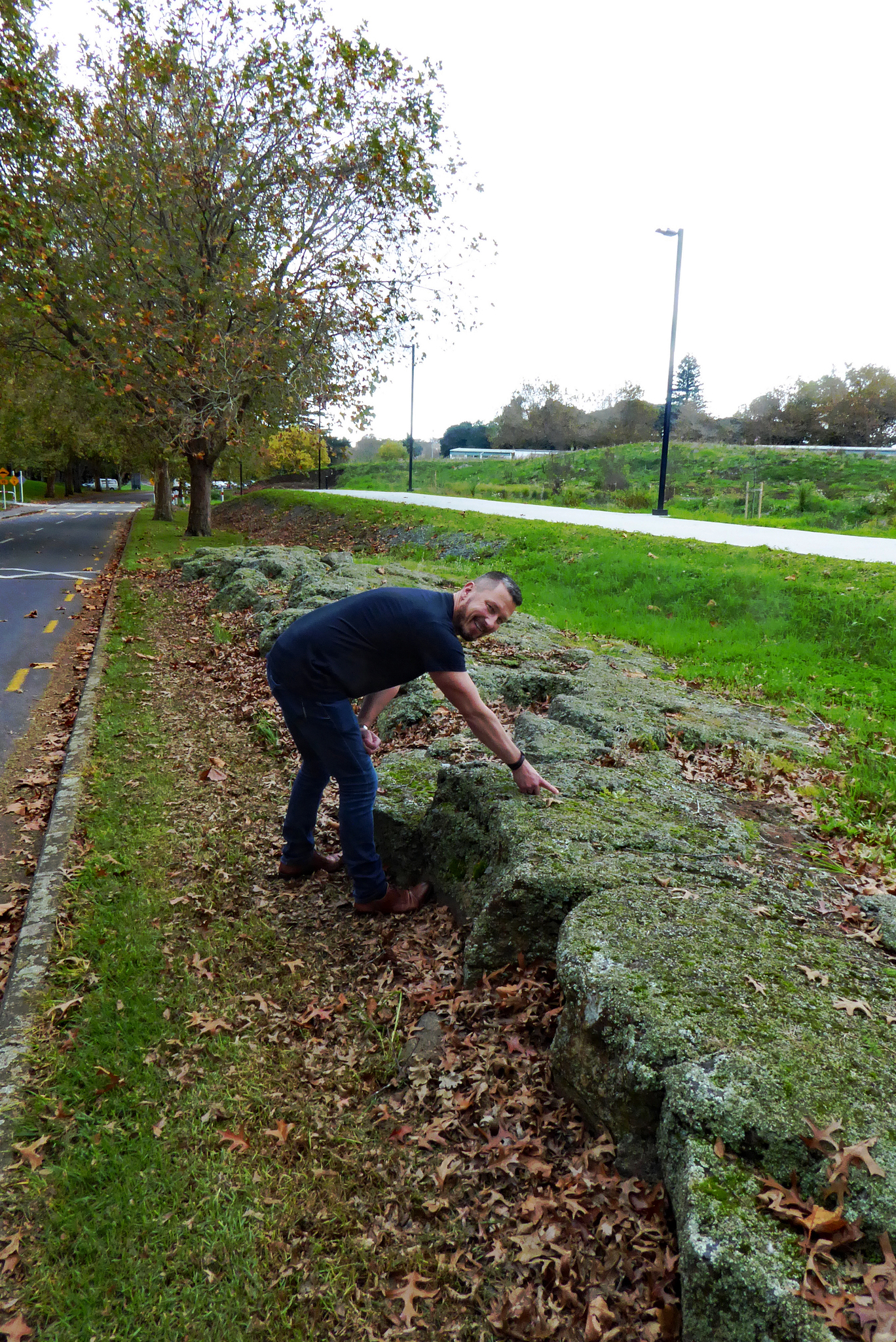
Dan Blanchon standing next to a specimen of Cladia blanchonii at the Unitec Mount Albert Campus, Auckland, New Zealand
