= Mount Burnett (Antarctica) =

Mountain in Antarctica

Mount Burnett (67°53′S 62°45′E) is a peak, 1,050 m, standing 1.5 nautical miles (2.8 km) southwest of Trost Peak in the Masson Range of the Framnes Mountains. Mapped by Norwegian cartographers from aerial photos taken by the Lars Christensen Expedition, 1936–37. Remapped by ANARE (Australian National Antarctic Research Expeditions), 1957–60, and named for Eric Burnett, radiophysicist at Mawson Station, 1958.
