= Exoneura cliffordiella =

Scientific classification
- Kingdom: Animalia
- Phylum: Arthropoda
- Clade: Pancrustacea
- Class: Insecta
- Order: Hymenoptera
- Family: Apidae
- Genus: Exoneura
- Species: E. cliffordiella

Binomial name
- Exoneura cliffordiella Rayment, 1953

Species of bee

Exoneura cliffordiella, or Exoneura (Brevineura) cliffordiella, is a species of reed bee in the tribe Allodapini. It is endemic to Australia. It was described in 1953 by Australian entomologist Tarlton Rayment from a specimen collected by naturalist Clifford Beauglehole.

== Description ==
The body length of the female holotype is 5 mm. The head and thorax are glossy black, the abdomen and legs ferruginous-red.

== Distribution and habitat ==
The species occurs in Victoria. The type locality is Gorae West.

== Behaviour ==
The adults are flying mellivores. Flowering plants visited by the bees include Eucalyptus viminalis.
