= Utricularia beaugleholei =

Scientific classification
- Kingdom: Plantae
- Clade: Tracheophytes
- Clade: Angiosperms
- Clade: Eudicots
- Clade: Asterids
- Order: Lamiales
- Family: Lentibulariaceae
- Genus: Utricularia
- Subgenus: Utricularia subg. Polypompholyx
- Section: Utricularia sect. Pleiochasia
- Species: U. beaugleholei

Binomial name
- Utricularia beaugleholei Gassin 1993

Species of plant

Utricularia beaugleholei is a terrestrial carnivorous plant that belongs to the genus Utricularia (family Lentibulariaceae). Its distribution ranges from southeastern South Australia through central and western Victoria into New South Wales, where it has been collected from the southern tablelands and southwest slopes.

It is named after Alexander Clifford Beauglehole, who originally noticed a potential new species among his Utricularia collections.

== See also ==
- List of Utricularia species
