= Gymnoderma insulare =

Conservation status
- Endangered (IUCN 3.1)

Scientific classification
- Kingdom: Fungi
- Division: Ascomycota
- Class: Lecanoromycetes
- Order: Lecanorales
- Family: Cladoniaceae
- Genus: Gymnoderma
- Species: G. insulare

Binomial name
- Gymnoderma insulare Yoshim. & Sharp (1968)

Species of lichen

Gymnoderma insulare is a species of lichen in the family Cladoniaceae. It is native to Japan and Taiwan, where it grows in old-growth temperate forests. The species is classified as endangered on the IUCN Red List due to its limited distribution and threats to its habitat.

== Taxonomy ==
The species was first formally described by Isao Yoshimura and Aaron John Sharp in 1968. The type specimen was collected in Japan by Syo Kurokawa on 7 November 1957, in the Kii Province on Mount Kōya, located on the island of Honshu. It was found growing on the trunk of Cryptomeria japonica at an elevation of around 800 metres.

== Description ==
The primary thallus of Gymnoderma insulare is made up of medium-sized scales (squamules), 5–10 mm long and 2–4 mm thick, with a narrowed base, more or less spatula-shaped, slightly lobed, and rounded. It lacks soredia and isidia. The upper surface is ochre-grey, dull, and has a cortex that reacts with potassium hydroxide (K+) by turning pale yellow, but does not react with para-phenylenediamine (P−) or calcium hypochlorite (C−). The underside lacks a cortex, is whitish or greyish-white, striated, and has ascending tips. There are no rhizines (root-like structures).

The cortical layer of the primary thallus is 60–80 μm thick and composed of densely interwoven and glued hyphae, but without forming a paraplectenchyma (a tissue made of tightly packed cells). The medullary layer is 150 μm thick, made up of loosely interwoven hyphae about 3 μm thick, whitish, and unreactive to K, P, and ultraviolet light (UV–). It contains didymic acid (iron [Fe+] test yields a blue reaction, C+ test results in a bluish-green reaction). No cephalodia (structures containing cyanobacteria) are present.

The podetia (stalk-like structures) arise from the margin of the primary thallus, are fairly short or abortive, cylindrical, simple, pale, solid, and covered with a continuous cortex layer that does not contain algae. Apothecia (fruiting bodies) are solitary or clustered, 0.5–0.8 mm wide, pale, biatorine (with no photobiont layer in the margin), and turn brownish or dark brown to black. The spores are hyaline (colourless and translucent), non-septate, oblong, 8–12 μm long, and 3 μm wide.

It resembles Gymnoderma coccocarpum in form, but contains different chemical substances. The photobiont partner is a green alga from the genus Trebouxia.

== Distribution and habitat ==
The species is known to occur in Japan (on the islands of Honshu, Kyushu, Shikoku, and Yakushima) and Taiwan. It grows specifically at the base of trunks of veteran trees in old-growth forests, particularly on Cryptomeria japonica in Japan and Chamaecyparis obtusa in Taiwan. Both of these host tree species are classified as Near Threatened by the IUCN.

Gymnoderma insulare is found at elevations between 800 and 1,000 meters above sea level. As of 2014, the species was known from only five locations, with an estimated area of occupancy of 24 km^{2} (9.3 sq mi).

== Conservation ==
Gymnoderma insulare is listed as Endangered on the IUCN Red List. The primary threats to the species include habitat loss and natural disasters. Historical intensive forestry practices have likely led to population declines in previous decades, while typhoons and other severe weather events pose a continuing threat to the species' habitat.

All known populations of G. insulare occur within protected areas. However, the species remains vulnerable due to its limited distribution and specific habitat requirements. The loss of old-growth forests containing its host tree species has restricted the lichen to a few remaining protected areas. The lichen is considered an old-growth dependent species with a long generation time, estimated at 33 years. This characteristic makes it particularly vulnerable to habitat disturbances and limits its ability to recolonise areas after forest loss.

Conservation efforts for G. insulare focus on several key strategies. These include the protection of its habitat within designated conservation areas and the ongoing monitoring of known populations. Additionally, researchers and conservationists have recommended further studies to better understand the species' population size, trends, and distribution in underexplored regions. These efforts aim to improve the long-term survival prospects of this rare and endangered lichen species.
