= Buellia foecunda =

Scientific classification
- Domain: Eukaryota
- Kingdom: Fungi
- Division: Ascomycota
- Class: Lecanoromycetes
- Order: Caliciales
- Family: Caliciaceae
- Genus: Buellia
- Species: B. foecunda

Binomial name
- Buellia foecunda Filson (1966)

Species of fungus

Buellia foecunda is a lichen in the family Caliciaceae.

It was first described in 1966 by Rex Filson from a specimen found on rocks in Mac. Robertson Land (in Antarctica).
