= Xanthoparmelia elixii =

Scientific classification
- Domain: Eukaryota
- Kingdom: Fungi
- Division: Ascomycota
- Class: Lecanoromycetes
- Order: Lecanorales
- Family: Parmeliaceae
- Genus: Xanthoparmelia
- Species: X. elixii

Binomial name
- Xanthoparmelia elixii Filson (1984)

Species of lichen in the family Parmeliaceae

Xanthoparmelia elixii is a lichen in the family Parmeliaceae, and found in South Australia.

It was first formally described in 1984 by Rex Filson, and the species epithet elixii honours the Australian chemist and lichenologist John Alan Elix.

== See also ==
- List of Xanthoparmelia species
