= Filson Nunatak =

- Nunatak
- Location within Antarctica
- Coordinates: 67°52′S 63°3′E

Filson Nunatak (67°52′S 63°3′E) is a small nunatak 6 nautical miles (11 km) east of Trost Peak in the eastern part of the Framnes Mountains, Mac. Robertson Land, Antarctica. It was photographed from Australian National Antarctic Research Expeditions (ANARE) aircraft in 1958 and seen by an ANARE party in December 1962. It was named by the Antarctic Names Committee of Australia for R. Filson, a carpenter at Mawson Station in 1962, and a member of the party.
