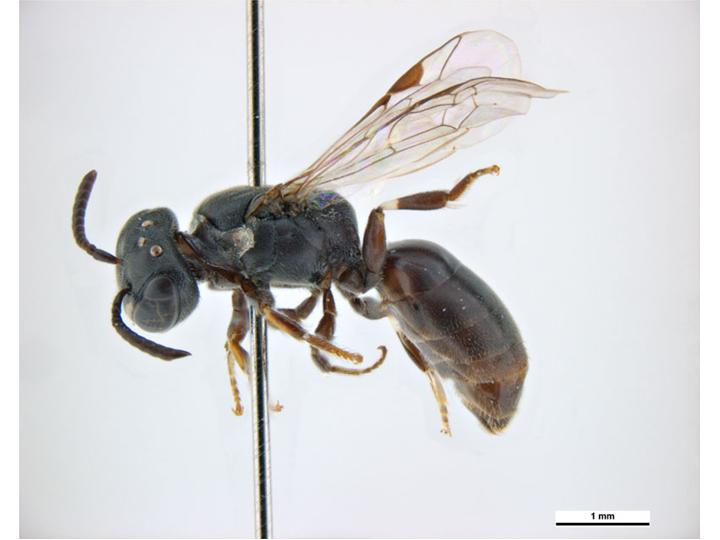
- Female

Scientific classification
- Kingdom: Animalia
- Phylum: Arthropoda
- Clade: Pancrustacea
- Class: Insecta
- Order: Hymenoptera
- Family: Colletidae
- Genus: Hylaeus
- Species: H. cliffordiellus

Binomial name
- Hylaeus cliffordiellus Rayment, 1953

= Hylaeus cliffordiellus =

Species of bee

Hylaeus cliffordiellus, or Hylaeus (Prosopisteron) cliffordiellus, is a species of bee in the family Colletidae and subfamily Hylaeinae. It is endemic to Australia. It was described by Australian entomologist Tarlton Rayment in 1953.

== Description ==
Body length is about 4.5 mm. Integumental colouration is mainly black, with yellow markings.

== Distribution and habitat ==
The species occurs in south-eastern Australia. The type locality is Gorae West in south-west Victoria.

== Behaviour ==
The adults are solitary flying mellivores. They nest in the dry stems of sedges (including Lepidosperma longitudinale) and have sedentary larvae.

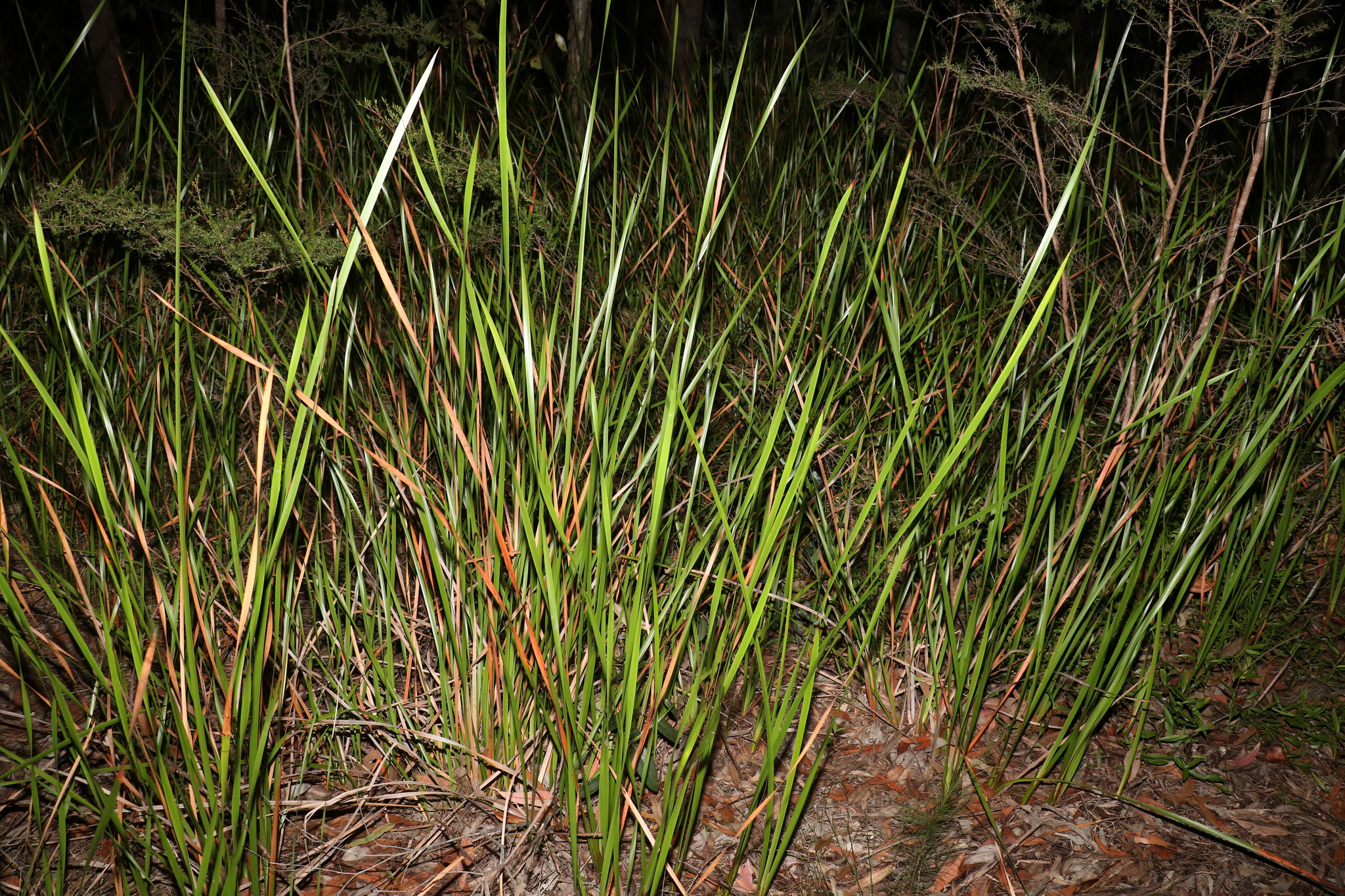
Lepidosperma longitudinale (pithy sword-sedge) provides nesting sites for the bees.
