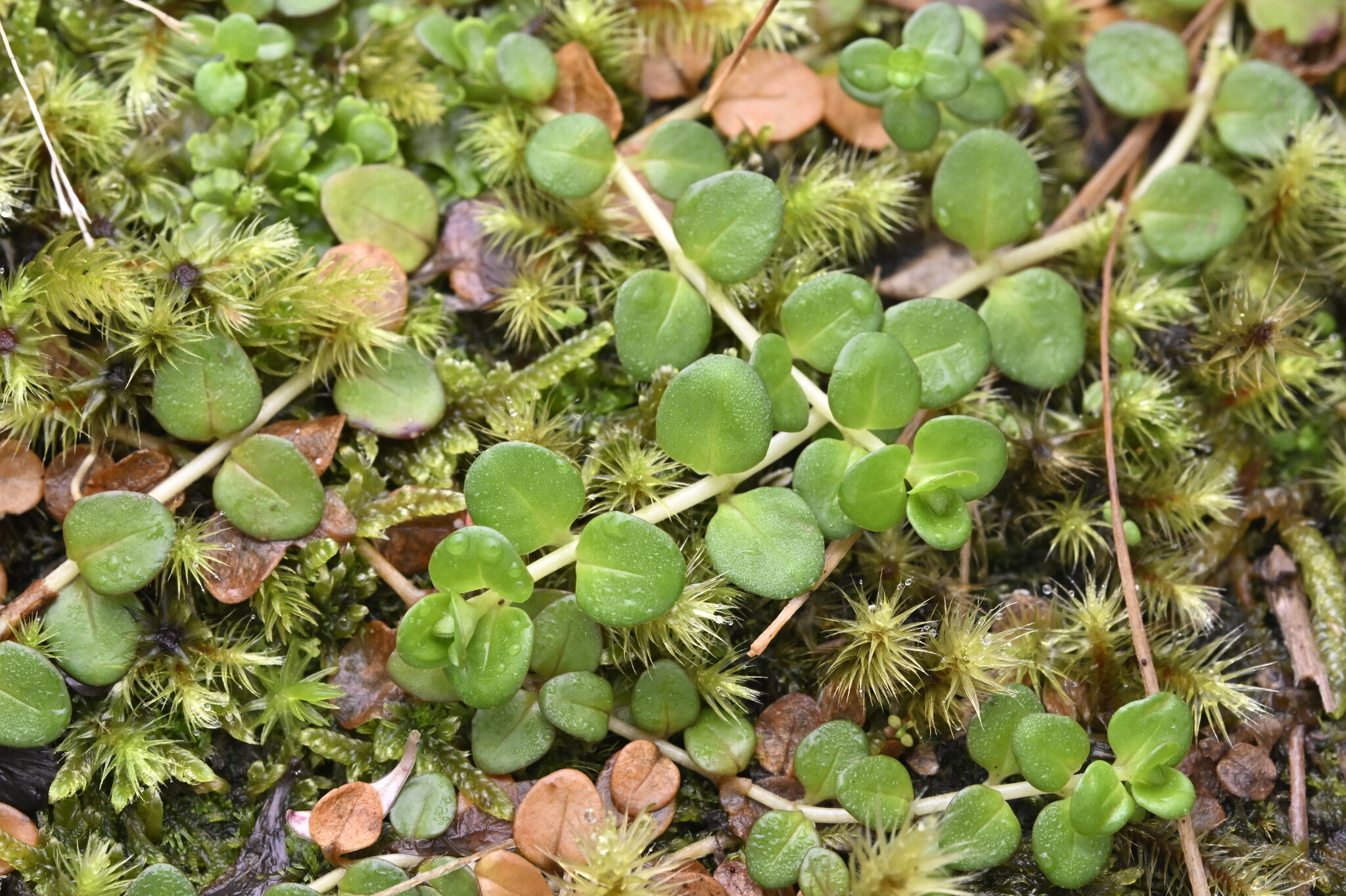

Scientific classification
- Kingdom: Plantae
- Clade: Tracheophytes
- Clade: Angiosperms
- Clade: Eudicots
- Clade: Rosids
- Order: Myrtales
- Family: Onagraceae
- Genus: Epilobium
- Species: E. brunnescens

Binomial name
- Epilobium brunnescens (Cockayne) P. H. Raven & Engelhorn

= Epilobium brunnescens =

Species of flowering plant in the willowherb family

Epilobium brunnescens is a flowering plant in the willowherb family Onagraceae. It is a small, creeping, perennial plant with white or pale pink flowers. It is native to New Zealand and south-east Australia and has been introduced to Northern Europe. Its common names include New Zealand willowherb in Great Britain and Ireland, creeping willowherb in New Zealand and bog willowherb for the Australian subspecies.

== Description ==
It is a low-growing, mat-forming plant with stems that trail along the ground, reaching 20 centimetres (8 in) in length. The stems have two rows of tiny hairs and have roots at the nodes. The flowers have white or pale pink petals that are 2.5–4 millimetres in length. The leaves are rounded and are usually 3–7 millimetres long, sometimes reaching 10 millimetres. They are purplish below, have smooth or slightly toothed edges and have a 0.5–3 millimetre stalk.

== Distribution and habitat ==
The species is widespread in New Zealand, occurring in the North Island, the South Island, on Stewart Island, in the Auckland Islands and the Campbell Islands as well as on the Australian possession of Macquarie Island. It grows in a variety of habitats, particularly open, shingly riverbeds in areas of high rainfall. Two subspecies are present in New Zealand: E. b. subsp. brunnescens which usually has nodding flowers and E. b. subsp. minutiflorum which usually has erect flowers.

The subspecies E. b. subsp. beaugleholei is restricted to a single site in Alpine National Park in eastern Victoria, south-east Australia. It grows on wet, mossy rocks close to a waterfall at an altitude of about 1,320 metres (4,330 ft). A survey in 2001 found only three patches of the plant, covering a total area of 1 m^{2} (11 sq ft). The subspecies is considered to be at high risk of extinction due to threats such as rock fall, drought, illegal collection and damage by visitors.

Epilobium brunnescens subsp. brunnescens has been introduced to Great Britain and Ireland where it was first recorded in 1904 in Craigmillar, Edinburgh. It spread rapidly from the 1930s onwards and is now widespread in northern and western areas where rainfall and humidity are higher. It has not yet spread to many parts of southern and central England and central Ireland. It occurs in various damp, open, gravelly or stony habitats including hillsides, stream banks, waste tips, stone walls, paths and railway sidings.

The species has also been introduced to Norway where it was first recorded in 1931 but is still rare.
