= Ramalea =

Scientific classification
- Kingdom: Fungi
- Division: Ascomycota
- Class: Lecanoromycetes
- Order: Lecanorales
- Genus: Ramalea; Nyl. (1866)

Type species
- Ramalea tribulosa Nyl. (1866)

Species
- R. coilophylla R. myriocladella R. tribulosa

Genus of lichen-forming fungi

Ramalea is a genus of lichen-forming fungi of uncertain familial placement in the order Lecanorales. It has three species.

== Taxonomy ==
The genus was circumscribed by the Finnish lichenologist William Nylander in 1866, with Ramalea tribulosa assigned as the type species. The type specimen of this species was collected by August von Krempelhuber in Cuba.

The taxonomic placement of Ramalea has been a subject of debate since its original description. Nylander initially considered it as an intermediate between the genera Cladonia and Ramalina, tentatively classifying it within what he termed 'tribus Ramalinei'. Subsequent lichenologists offered varying perspectives on its classification. Vainio, in 1887 and 1894, excluded Ramalea from Cladonia, but included the species C. coilophylla. In 1896, Müller expanded the genus by introducing the Australasian endemic species R. cochleata, drawing comparisons to Cladonia papillaria.

More recent taxonomic treatments have continued to grapple with the placement of Ramalea. Some authors proposed its inclusion in the Cladoniaceae close to Cladonia. However, Ahti (1993) did not include Ramalea in his list of names in the Cladoniaceae, and later suggested that R. cochleata might be excluded from Ramalea sensu stricto. Historically, the genus has indeed been included in the Cladoniaceae.

In 2003, based on morphological and anatomical studies, Hammer proposed the creation of a new genus, Notocladonia, to accommodate R. cochleata and a newly described species, N. undulata. This reclassification placed Notocladonia within the Cladoniaceae, while suggesting that the remaining Ramalea species should be excluded from this family. The Australasian species once called Ramalea cochleata Müll.Arg. (1896) is now Notocladonia cochleata, after having been transferred to Notocladonia in 2003.

In 2023, molecular phylogenetics research was published that showed the genus probably belongs to the family Ramalinaceae, based on analysis of recent collections of R. coilophylla from its type locality in Brazil.

== Species ==
Species Fungorum (in the Catalogue of Life) accepts three species of Ramalea:

- Ramalea coilophylla (Müll.Arg.) Müll.Arg. (1895)
- Ramalea myriocladella Müll.Arg. (1895)
- Ramalea tribulosa Nyl. (1866)
