= Metus (fungus) =

Scientific classification
- Domain: Eukaryota
- Kingdom: Fungi
- Division: Ascomycota
- Class: Lecanoromycetes
- Order: Lecanorales
- Family: Cladoniaceae
- Genus: Metus; D.J.Galloway & P.James (1987)

Type species
- Metus conglomeratus (F.Wilson) D.J.Galloway & P.James (1987)

Species
- M. conglomeratus M. efflorescens M. pileatus

Genus of lichens in the family Cladoniaceae

Metus is a genus of three species of lichenized fungi in the family Cladoniaceae. The genus was circumscribed by lichenologists David John Galloway and Peter Wilfred James in 1987, with Metus conglomeratus as the type species. All three species are found in the Southern Hemisphere.

Galloway and James suggested a placement of the genus in Cladoniaceae, a classification that was later supported with phylogenetic analysis.

== Species ==
- Metus conglomeratus (F.Wilson) D.J.Galloway & P.James (1987)
- Metus efflorescens D.J.Galloway & P.James (1987)
- Metus pileatus (Mont.) D.J.Galloway & P.James (1987)
