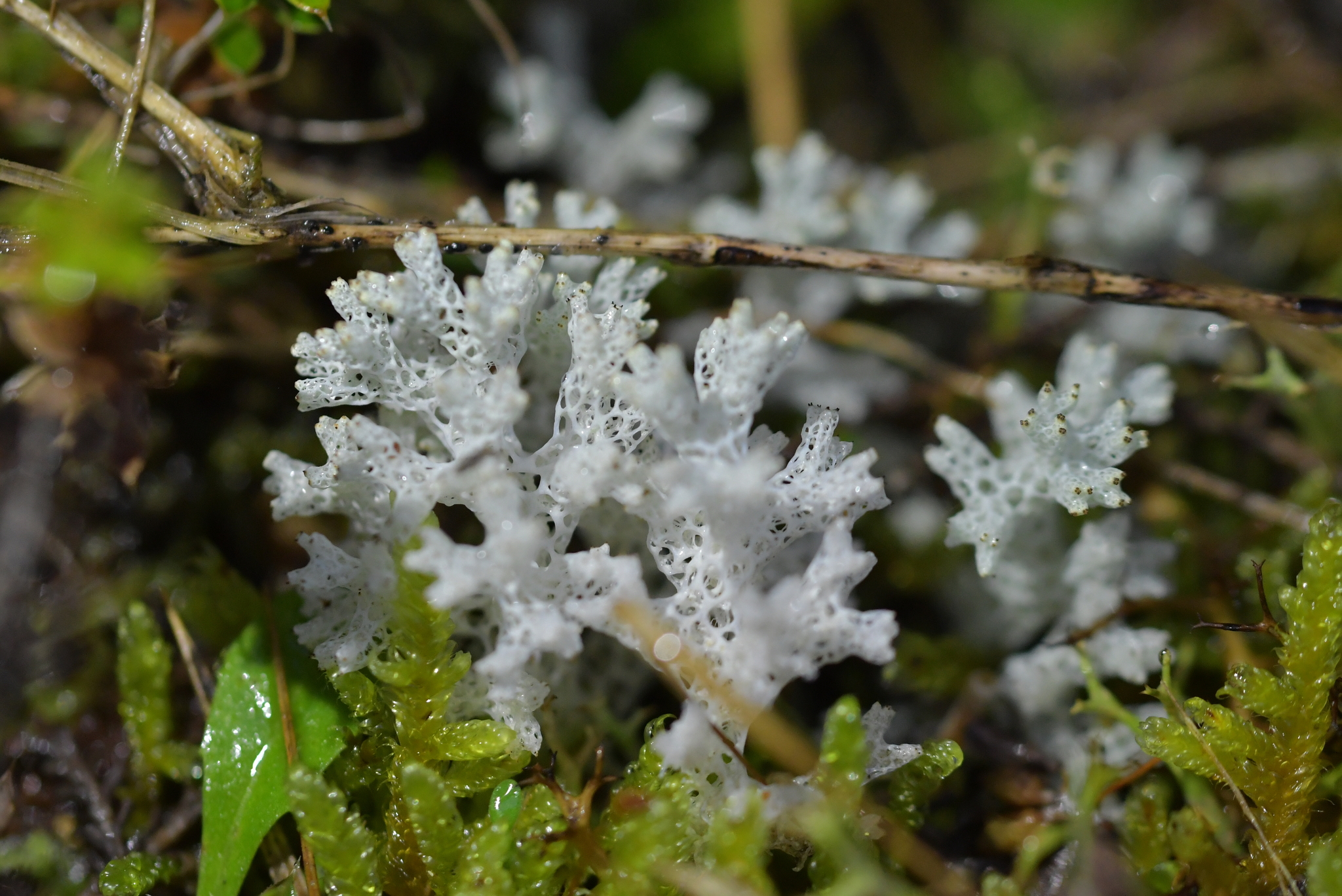
- Pulchrocladia retipora

Scientific classification
- Kingdom: Fungi
- Division: Ascomycota
- Class: Lecanoromycetes
- Order: Lecanorales
- Family: Cladoniaceae
- Genus: Pulchrocladia; S.Stenroos, Pino-Bodas, Lumbsch & Ahti (2018)

Type species
- Pulchrocladia retipora (Labill.) S.Stenroos, Pino-Bodas & Ahti (2018)

Species
- P. corallaizon P. ferdinandii P. retipora

= Pulchrocladia =

Genus of lichen

Pulchrocladia is a small genus of fruticose lichens in the family Cladoniaceae. It has three species. The genus was established in 2018 when DNA studies revealed that the traditional genus Cladia contained several distinct evolutionary groups, leading scientists to separate them into different genera. These ground-dwelling lichens are found only in the Southern Hemisphere, particularly in Australia and New Zealand, where they form coral-like cushions with intricate lattice patterns in open heathlands, bogs, and coastal areas.

== Taxonomy ==
Pulchrocladia was erected as a segregate genus of the Cladoniaceae in 2018, when multilocus phylogenetic analyses showed that Cladia in its traditional wide sense was paraphyletic. The study resolved three well-supported lineages within Cladia: clade A (now Rexiella), clade B (Cladia sensu stricto), and clade C, which was recognised as Pulchrocladia to maintain monophyly across the group. The new genus received strong statistical support and was formally published by Soili Stenroos, Raquel Pino-Bodas, Helge Thorsten Lumbsch and Teuvo Ahti. The genus name (from the Latin pulchro, meaning "pretty" or "beautiful") refers to "the beautiful morphology of its species".

Morphologically and chemically, Pulchrocladia is distinct from both Cladia s.str. and Rexiella. Its pseudopodetia are robust, yellow-tinged and richly fenestrate, forming an almost coral-like reticulate lattice; the inner medulla is stranded and reticulate rather than hollow or loosely filled. Chemically the genus is characterised by the consistent presence of usnic acid and atranorin, and the absence of divaricatic acid, which dominates in Rexiella. These features, together with the coralloid branching pattern and regularly spaced fenestrations, provide reliable characters for field and herbarium recognition.

== Habitat and distribution ==
Species of Pulchrocladia are ground-dwelling, fruticose lichens that favour open, well-lit situations. They usually form pulvinate, coral-like cushions on acidic, nutrient-poor substrates—most often peaty or sandy soils in coastal and alpine heathlands, but they are also recorded from granite screes, subalpine peat bogs, and, more rarely, decaying wood or rocky ledges. Their strongly fenestrate pseudopodetia enhance ventilation and water-shedding, allowing the thalli to endure the fluctuating moisture and temperature typical of these exposed habitats.

Pulchrocladia is confined to the southern hemisphere, its centre of diversity in Australasia and extending north-eastwards to New Caledonia. The type species, P. retipora, ranges widely—from Queensland, New South Wales, Victoria and Tasmania through New Zealand (including the Antipodes, Auckland, Campbell and Chatham Islands) to New Caledonia. P. ferdinandii is an Australian endemic recorded in the Australian Capital Territory, New South Wales, Queensland, South Australia and Western Australia. The narrowly distributed P. corallaizon is known only from South and Western Australia. Collectively, these ranges span tropical to subantarctic latitudes.

== Species ==
Pulchrocladia comprises 3 species:

- Pulchrocladia corallaizon (F.Wilson ex Filson) S.Stenroos, Pino-Bodas & Ahti (2018)
- Pulchrocladia ferdinandii (Müll.Arg.) S.Stenroos, Pino-Bodas & Ahti (2018)
- Pulchrocladia retipora (Labill.) S.Stenroos, Pino-Bodas & Ahti (2018)
