= Megachile cliffordi =

Scientific classification
- Kingdom: Animalia
- Phylum: Arthropoda
- Class: Insecta
- Order: Hymenoptera
- Family: Megachilidae
- Genus: Megachile
- Species: M. cliffordi

Binomial name
- Megachile cliffordi Rayment, 1953

Species of leafcutter bee (Megachile)

Megachile cliffordi is a species of bee in the family Megachilidae. It was described by Rayment in 1953.
