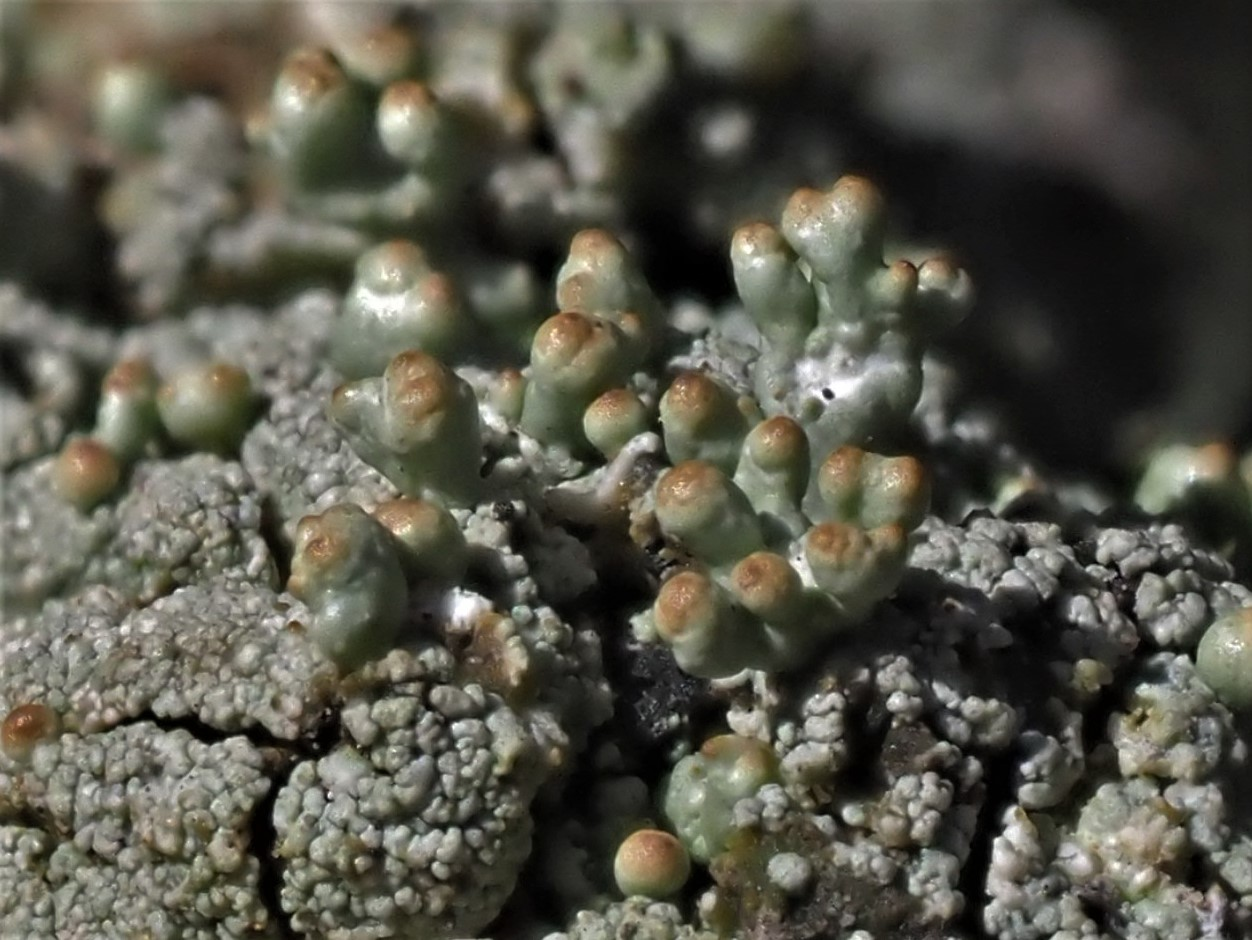
- Pycnothelia papillaria

Scientific classification
- Kingdom: Fungi
- Division: Ascomycota
- Class: Lecanoromycetes
- Order: Lecanorales
- Family: Cladoniaceae
- Genus: Pycnothelia (Ach.) Dufour (1821)

Type species
- Pycnothelia papillaria (Ehrh.) Dufour (1821)

Species
- P. caliginosa P. mascarena P. papillaria

Synonyms
- Cenomyce sect. Pycnothelia Ach. (1799); Cladonia subgen. Pycnothelia (Ach.) Vain. (1926); Papillaria J.Kickx f. (1835); Pycnotheliomyces Cif. & Tomas. (1953)

= Pycnothelia =

Genus of lichen-forming fungi

Pycnothelia is a small genus of lichen-forming fungi in the family Cladoniaceae. The genus contains three species that form distinctive upright, hollow stalks (podetia) rising from a grainy crust, topped with dark, round fruiting bodies. These lichens typically grow on soil or mossy ground in cool, humid habitats. The genus has a scattered global distribution, with one species found across Europe and parts of the Americas, while the other two are restricted to islands in the Southern Hemisphere.

== Taxonomy ==
Erik Acharius treated the group as a sectional concept within Cenomyce (sect. Pycnothelia) and centred it on the species long known as Lichen papillaria. In his Latin diagnosis he characterised the taxon as a grey, granular, ramulose crust with discrete, erect, short, almost unbranched, hollow and somewhat swollen white ramuli bearing dark, globose tubercles (i.e. the little stalks are fistulose and end in round, dark apothecia). He also noted it is terrestrial and, because of the hollow, branched ramuli, allied to Cladonia. Acharius listed contemporary synonyms (e.g. Cladonia papillaria Hoffm.) under the same concept.

Dufour then lifted Acharius's sectional name to generic rank as Pycnothelia (1821). Modern multilocus work keeps Pycnothelia as a good genus in Cladoniaceae, with three species currently accepted, and places it in a well-supported clade with Carassea and Gymnoderma that is sister to Cladonia. For practical diagnosis at the generic level, authors emphasise the persistent granulose primary thallus and the slender, hollow podetia that are simple or only branched near the tips, with a fully or partly corticate surface.

== Description ==
As a genus, Pycnothelia is defined by a persistent, grainy (granulose) primary thallus and slender, hollow tubular stalks (podetia) that are simple or only branched near the tips, with the podetial surface completely or partly corticate.

Diagnostic differences among the three species: P. mascarena has taller (20–40 mm), densely packed, thin podetia with short lateral branchlets near the tip; P. papillaria has tooth-like, smoothly corticate podetia with a white medulla and branching apothecia; P. caliginosa has somewhat terete, partly decorticate podetia with a cracked or granular surface and a black medulla.

== Habitat and distribution ==
The genus shows a strikingly disjunct distribution pattern. P. papillaria is broadly distributed in Europe, eastern and far-northern North America, limited parts of Asia (Turkey, Azerbaijan, Russian Far East), and into the Neotropics (Dominican Republic, Brazil, Uruguay); several countries report recent declines. P. caliginosa is restricted to New Zealand and Tasmania, whereas P. mascarena is, so far, confined to Réunion.

== Species ==
- Pycnothelia caliginosa D.J.Galloway & P.James (1987)
- Pycnothelia mascarena (Nyl.) Nyl. ex Leight. (1866)
- Pycnothelia papillaria (Ehrh.) Dufour (1821)
