= Rexiella =

Scientific classification
- Kingdom: Fungi
- Division: Ascomycota
- Class: Lecanoromycetes
- Order: Lecanorales
- Family: Cladoniaceae
- Genus: Rexiella; S.Stenroos, Pino‐Bodas & Ahti (2019)

Type species
- Rexiella sullivanii (Müll.Arg.) S.Stenroos, Pino‐Bodas & Ahti (2019)

Species
- R. fuliginosa R. sullivanii

Synonyms
- Rexia S.Stenroos, Pino‐Bodas & Ahti (2018)

Genus of lichens

Rexiella is a small lichen genus in the family Cladoniaceae. The genus was originally established in 2018 but had to be renamed in 2019 because the original name conflicted with an earlier genus of cyanobacteria, with both names honouring Australian lichenologist Rex Filson. These shrubby lichens form upright, horn-like stalks that are riddled with window-like holes and have a distinctive dark grey to black interior filling, distinguishing them from similar-looking relatives.

== Taxonomy ==
The genus, originally circumscribed with the name Rexia by authors Soili Stenroos, Raquel Pino-Bodas, and Teuvo Ahti in 2018, was created to contain the species Cladonia sullivanii, first formally described in 1882 by Swiss botanist Johannes Müller Argoviensis. After publication of the new genus, it was discovered that the name was illegitimate, because an earlier homonym had been published; the generic name Rexia D.A.Casamatta, S.R.Gomez & J.R.Johansen had already been created in 2006 to contain the cyanobacterial species Rexia erecta. The new name Rexiella was therefore proposed in 2019. Both the original name Rexia and the replacement name Rexiella honour the Australian lichenologist Rex Filson, who published monographs on the genera Cladia and Heterodea.

== Description ==
Rexiella forms shrubby tufts of upright secondary branches known as pseudopodetia. The fragile primary crust quickly weathers away, so the eye is drawn to the green- to yellow-tinged pseudopodetia, which stand 2.5–14 cm tall and about 2–4 mm across. They are stiff and horn-like when dry but soften to a spongy texture after rain. Each stalk is irregularly ridged or angular, may divide a few times, and is riddled with narrow, window-like holes that give the surface a lace-like appearance. A thin, sometimes glossy cortex is dusted with minute crystals. Inside, the usual central cavity is almost completely packed with a loosely woven medulla that can be white near the tips but grades to charcoal grey or black lower down—one of the easiest field clues that the lichen is Rexiella rather than Cladia or Pulchrocladia.

Reproduction occurs at the branch tips. Fertile pseudopodetia bear pin-head apothecia: tiny, shield-shaped discs 0.25–0.5 mm wide whose dark brown to black margins fuse with the hymenium (a structure termed "lecideine"). Inside each disc, the asci release single-celled, colourless ascospores about 25 × 5 μm. Sterile branches often finish in blunt pycnidia that exude a clear slime loaded with straight or slightly curved conidia roughly 6 × 1 μm.

Chemical tests consistently show divaricatic acid as the principal secondary metabolite, usually accompanied by usnic, ursolic, protolichesterinic and nordivaricatic acids in varying proportions. This combination, together with the medulla that nearly fills the stalk and the irregularly spaced elliptical perforations, separates Rexiella from the superficially similar but chemically atranorin-rich Pulchrocladia and from Cladia, which retains a hollow canal.

== Species ==
- Rexiella fuliginosa (Filson) S.Stenroos, Pino-Bodas & Ahti (2019)
- Rexiella sullivanii (Müll.Arg.) S.Stenroos, Pino-Bodas & Ahti (2019)
