= Trost Peak =

Mountain in Antarctica

Coordinates: 67°52′S 62°48′E

Trost Peak is a peak, 980 m, standing 1.5 nautical miles (2.8 km) northeast of Mount Burnett in the Masson Range of the Framnes Mountains. Mapped by Norwegian cartographers from aerial photos taken by the Lars Christensen Expedition, 1936–37. Remapped by ANARE (Australian National Antarctic Research Expeditions), 1957–60, and named for P.A. Trost, physicist at Mawson Station, 1958.
