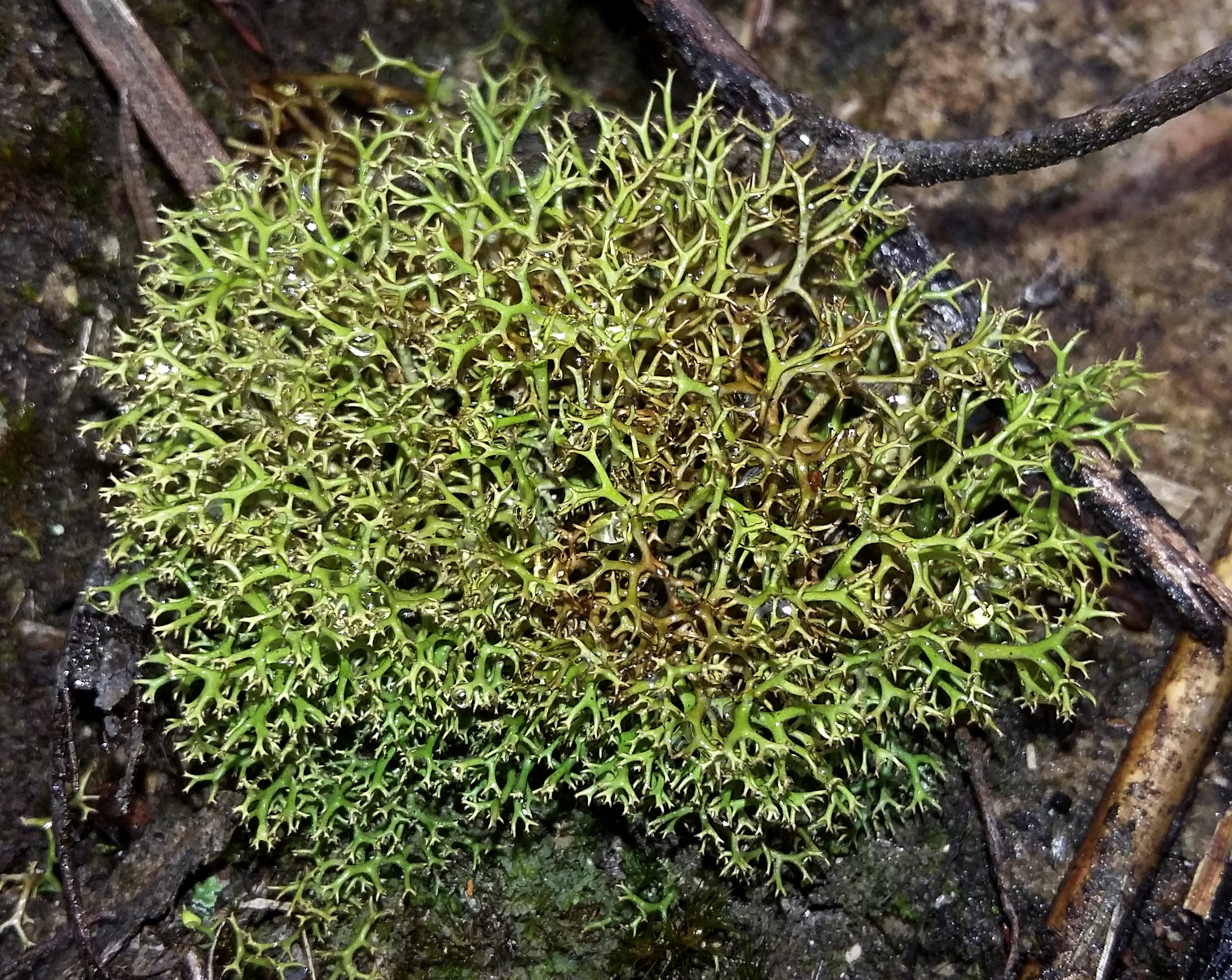
- Cladia aggregata

Scientific classification
- Kingdom: Fungi
- Division: Ascomycota
- Class: Lecanoromycetes
- Order: Lecanorales
- Family: Cladoniaceae
- Genus: Cladia; Nyl. (1870)

Type species
- Cladia aggregata (Sw.) Nyl. (1870)

Synonyms
- Trichocladia Stirt. (1882); Clathrina Müll.Arg. (1883); Ramalinora Lumbsch (1995)

= Cladia =

Genus of lichen-forming fungi

Cladia is a genus of lichen-forming fungi in the family Cladoniaceae. Cladia species have a crustose or squamulose (scaly) primary thallus and a fruticose, secondary thallus, often referred to as pseudopodetium. The type species of the genus, Cladia aggregata, is widely distributed, occurring in South America, South Africa, Australasia and South-East Asia to southern Japan and India. Most of the other species are found in the Southern Hemisphere.

== Taxonomy ==
Cladia was circumscribed by Finnish lichenologist William Nylander in 1870 with Cladia aggregata as the type species. Rex Filson created a separate family, the Cladiaceae, to contain the genus, but this is no longer used and the genus is classified in the family Cladoniaceae. An updated phylogeny of the Cladoniaceae was published in 2018.

Molecular phylogenetic evidence showed that the genera Heterodea and Ramalinora were nested within Cladina, so they became synonyms in 2012. Because the name Heterodea predated Cladina, the generic name Cladia was proposed for conservation against Heterodea to avoid several nomenclatural changes that would have been necessary. The proposal was accepted by both the Nomenclature Committee for Fungi and the General Committee.

Later, Heterodea was resurrected, along with the creation of Pulchrocladia and Rexia (now Rexiella)

== Description ==
Cladia consists of fruticose lichens with typically a perforate pseudopodetia with an external cartilaginous layer. The apothecia are black or brown and have a persistent proper margin and a flat disc. The asci are eight-spored with a well-developed amyloid tholus with a darker-staining central tube. The pycnidia are immersed in grossly black to brown projections that are initially blunt and measure up to 0.5 mm long and eventually become needle-like and up to 1 mm long.

== Ecology ==
Eight species of lichenicolous fungi are known to grow on Cladia: Echinothecium cladoniae Keissl. nom. nud. (on C. aggregata from Columbia; Etayo 2002), Lichenoconium echinosporum D. Hawksw. (on C. muelleri from Australia; Hawksworth 1977), Roselliniella heterodeae Matzer & Hafellner (on C. muelleri from Australia; Matzer & Hafellner 1990); Pyrenidium actinellum Nyl. agg. (on C. aggregata from Columbia; Etayo 2002); Endococcus cladiae Zhurb. & Pino-Bodas; Lichenopeltella soiliae Zhurb. & Pino-Bodas, and Lichenosticta hoegnabbae Zhurb. & Pino-Bodas.

== Chemistry ==
The type species, Cladia aggregata, is highly variable morphologically and has extensive chemical variation. Kantvilas and Elix (1999) revised the C. aggregata complex in Tasmania and identified six chemotypes in C. aggregata sensu stricto. Similarly, five chemotypes were found in specimens from the states of Paraná and Santa Catarina, Brazil. In both studies, most of them contained barbatic acid and 4-O-demethylbarbatic acid. Barbatic acid is cytotoxic, and kills the worms of Schistosoma mansoni in in vitro studies. This is the causative agent of Schistosomiasis.

== Species ==
Revisions of Cladia published in 2012 and 2013 included 23 species in the genus. As of December 2023, Species Fungorum accepts 20 species in Cladia:

- Cladia aggregata (Sw.) Nyl. (1870)
- Cladia asiatica J.Abreu, Barcenas-Peña, Poengs., Xin Yu Wang, Jen P.Huang, Lumbsch & Grewe (2026) – East Asia
- Cladia blanchonii Parnmen & Lumbsch (2013) – Australia, New Zealand
- Cladia cryptica Parnmen & Lumbsch (2013)
- Cladia deformis Kantvilas & Elix (2000)
- Cladia dumicola Kantvilas & Elix (2000)
- Cladia glaucolivida (Müll.Arg.) Parnmen & Lumbsch (2012)
- Cladia globosa Ahti (2000)
- Cladia gorgonea (Eschw.) Parnmen & Lumbsch (2013)
- Cladia inflata (F.Wilson) D.J.Galloway (1977)
- Cladia moniliformis Kantvilas & Elix (1987)
- Cladia mutabilis Kantvilas & Elix (2000)
- Cladia neocaledonica (Räsänen) Parnmen & Lumbsch (2013)
- Cladia occulta Kantvilas (2012) – Tasmania
- Cladia oreophila Kantvilas & Elix (2000)
- Cladia schizopora (Nyl.) Nyl. (1888)
- Cladia tasmanica Parnmen & Lumbsch (2013)
- Cladia terebrata (Laurer) Parnmen & Lumbsch (2013)
- Cladia xanthocarpa Elix & P.M.McCarthy (2018) – Australia
