= Rex Bertram Filson =

Australian botanist/lichenologist

- Born: 16 March 1930; Sydney, Bondi
- Education: Monash University
- Occupations: Botanist; carpenter; lichenologist; botanical collector
- Awards: Churchill Fellowship (1971)
- Scientific career
- Workplaces: Australian Antarctic Division (1961–1963); Royal Botanic Gardens Melbourne (1964–1988)
- Author abbrev. (botany): Filson

Rex Bertram Filson (born 1930) is an Australian lichenologist who made major contributions to knowledge of lichens in Australia and Antarctica.

Early in his career Filson worked as a carpenter in various places around Australia, and from 1961 to 1963 was employed as a carpenter by the Australian Antarctic Division. This was the start of his career as a lichenologist.

In 1964, he was employed by the Royal Botanic Gardens. Employment with the Victorian Department of Crown Lands and Survey followed (1964–1988), first as a seed-collector and finally as senior botanist. During this period, he acquired a Master of Science (1979) and a Doctor of Science (1988) from Monash University. In 1970, Filson was awarded a Churchill Fellowship to compare northern hemisphere with Australian lichens. The National Herbarium of Victoria holds the majority of Filson's collections, over 15,000 specimens, with duplicates distributed around Australian Herbaria including AD, BRI, CANB, HO, NSW and PERTH, with several in overseas herbaria such s MSK, GZU, F and UPS. In 1975, Filson edited the exsiccata Lichenes Antarctici exsiccati.

Filson Nunatak in Antarctica is named in his honour, as are the lichen genera Filsoniana and Rexiella.

== Standard author abbreviation ==
The standard author abbreviation Filson is used to indicate this person as the author when citing a botanical name.

== Selected taxa ==
An advanced search of the MycoBank database shows that he authored some 90 fungi, including:

- Buellia foecunda Filson
- Heterodea beaugleholei Filson (now Cladia beaugleholei)
- Xanthoparmelia elixii Filson
