= Enterographa rotundata =

Scientific classification
- Domain: Eukaryota
- Kingdom: Fungi
- Division: Ascomycota
- Class: Arthoniomycetes
- Order: Arthoniales
- Family: Roccellaceae
- Genus: Enterographa
- Species: E. rotundata

Binomial name
- Enterographa rotundata M.Cáceres, E.L.Lima & Aptroot (2013)

Species of lichen-forming fungus

Enterographa rotundata is a species of corticolous (bark-dwelling) crustose lichen in the family Roccellaceae. This species was discovered in Brazil, growing on the smooth bark of trees in the Brazilian Caatinga forest. It has round apothecia (lichen structures where spores are produced), a feature that sets it apart from most of its kind.

== Taxonomy ==
Enterographa rotundata was first formally described by lichenologists Marcela Cáceres, Edvaneide Leandro de Lima, and André Aptroot in 2012. Its type specimen was discovered by the second author on the bark of a tree in the Catimbau National Park, in the Pernambuco state of Brazil, at an altitude of approximately 900 m (3,000 ft). The species name rotundata is derived from the Latin word rotundus, which translates to "round", a fitting descriptor for the species' distinct round apothecia.

== Description ==
The Enterographa rotundata lichen has a crust-like thallus (lichen body), which is often very thin, making it appear almost non-existent. Its colour varies from pale pinkish to pale brownish, and it adheres closely to the surface of the tree bark. Its photobiont is from the green algal genus Trentepohlia.

Enterographa rotundata is distinguished by its round or slightly ellipsoidal ascomata, the sexual reproductive structures of lichen, which are dark brown to black in colour. The ascomata are 0.1–0.2 mm wide with a raised, ochraceous white margin approximately 0.05 mm wide. Each ascus, the spore-bearing structure within the ascomata, typically contains eight hyaline ascospores. These are narrowly clavate (club-shaped), 50–60 by 3.5–5.0 μm in size, and surrounded by a gelatinous sheath.

One of the notable characteristics of Enterographa rotundata is its lack of detectable substances, which is relatively unusual for a lichen. It has been observed to have no reactions with the standard chemical spot tests (UV−, C−, P−, and K−); the lack of substances has been confirmed by thin-layer chromatography.

== Habitat and distribution ==
Enterographa rotundata is primarily found on the smooth bark of trees in the Caatinga forest, a unique dry forest biome found only in Brazil. In this environment, it coexists with other lichen species such as Dirinaria leopoldii, Lecanora leprosa, L. leproplaca, Pertusaria ventosa, Phaeographis ventosa, and Ramboldia haematites.

== Similar species ==
Enterographa rotundata is one of very few Enterographa species with round apothecia. It bears a superficial resemblance to Enterographa lecanoracea and Enterographa mesomela, both of which, however, have distinguishing features. E lecanoracea is characterised by larger ascomata, while E. mesomela has a grey-green thallus and slightly shorter ascospores.

Other species such as E. anguinella, E. batistae, E. byssoidea, and E. perez-higaredae also have typically round apothecia but differ in their ascomata size, chemistry, and habitat. For instance, E. batistae has the smallest ascomata, E. byssoidea is recognised by its byssoid apothecium margin, and E. perez-higaredae is known for the presence of psoromic acid.

The lichen species Lecanographa atropunctata is also superficially similar but can be differentiated by its thicker dark brown to black excipulum and hypothecium, more septate ascospores, and the presence of schizopeltic acid, a compound not found in Enterographa rotundata.
