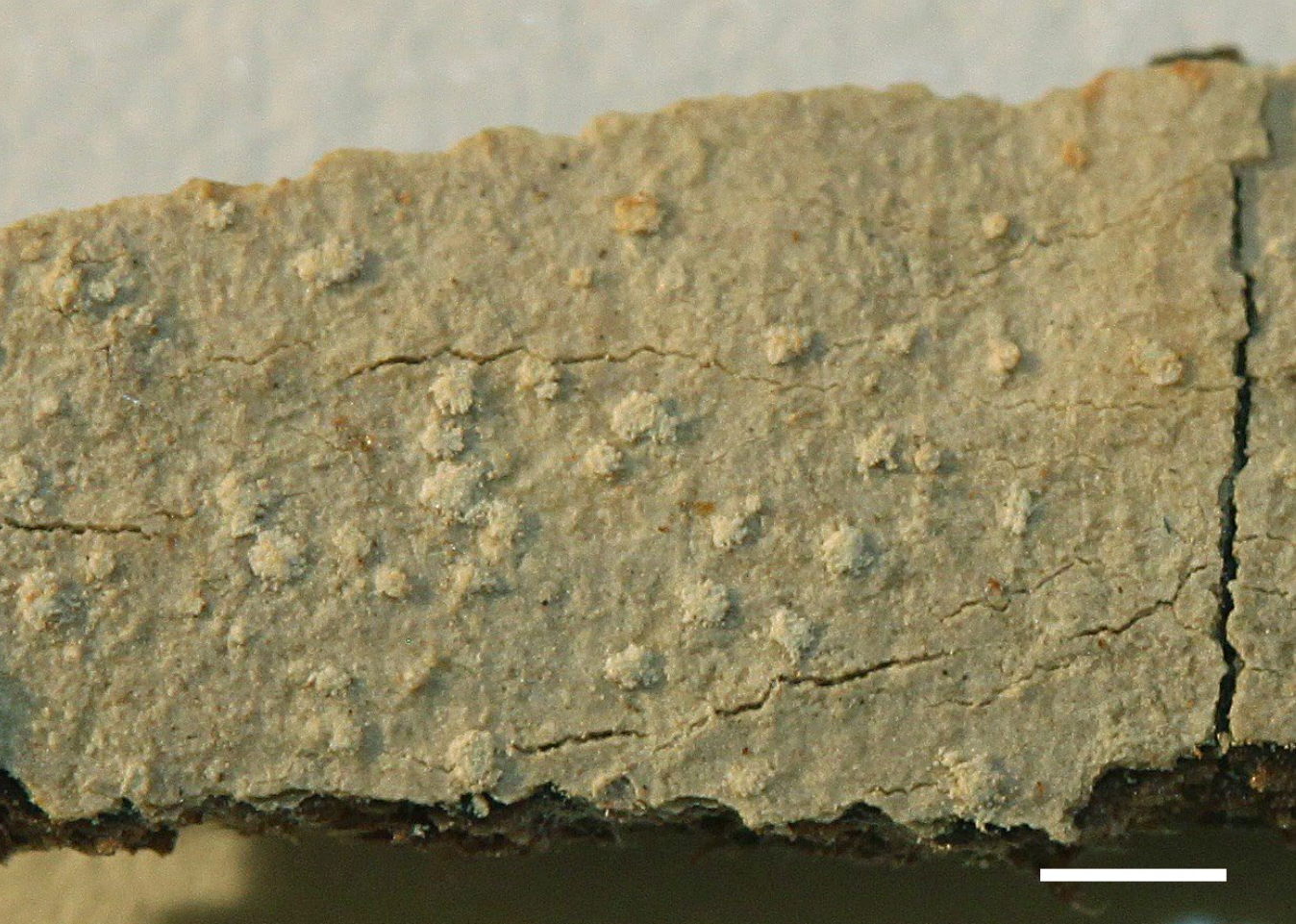
- Thallus of Enterographa_kinabaluensis, showing punctiform soralia

Scientific classification
- Kingdom: Fungi
- Division: Ascomycota
- Class: Arthoniomycetes
- Order: Arthoniales
- Family: Roccellaceae
- Genus: Enterographa
- Species: E. kinabaluensis

Binomial name
- Enterographa kinabaluensis Sparrius & Kalb (2020)

= Enterographa kinabaluensis =

Species of lichen

Enterographa kinabaluensis is a species of corticolous (bark-dwelling) crustose lichen in the family Ramalinaceae. Found in coastal rainforests on the island of Borneo, it was described as a new species in 2020. Characterised by its white thallus, punctiform (dot-like) soralia and norstictic acid content, this lichen is readily recognisable when fertile.

== Taxonomy ==
Enterographa kinabaluensis was first described by lichenologists Lauren Sparrius and Klaus Kalb. The type specimen was collected in a coastal rainforest on Sapi Island (the location of a public marine park), near Kota Kinabalu, Sabah, Malaysia. The species name kinabaluensis is derived from the type locality near Kota Kinabalu in Malaysia. Although the presence of ascomata on the soredia might initially suggest a parasitic relationship, this was ruled out by the authors because of the identical chemistry of both the thallus and the ascomatal margin.

== Description ==
The thallus of Enterographa kinabaluensis is smooth, white, and thin, measuring 100–150 μm in height. It forms a continuous to finely areolate pattern that can cover a large area of the bark surface. The photobiont is trentepohlioid, and the medulla is cream-coloured, containing abundant crystals of norstictic acid. This lichen species is characterised by its punctiform soralia, measuring 0.3–0.7 mm in diameter, and its shortly lirelline ascomata, which often arise from the soralia. The ascospores are fusiform, hyaline, and measure 4–5 by 39–52 μm, with 11–17 septa.

Enterographa kinabaluensis can be distinguished from other Enterographa species with sorediate thalli, such as E. zephyri and E. incognita, by the presence of norstictic acid and the unique arrangement of its ascomata on the soredia.

== Habitat and distribution ==
Enterographa kinabaluensis is known only from its type locality in a coastal rainforest on Sapi Island, near Kota Kinabalu, Sabah, Malaysia. It grows on tree bark.
