= Sporopodiopsis sipmanii =

Scientific classification
- Kingdom: Fungi
- Division: Ascomycota
- Class: Lecanoromycetes
- Order: Lecanorales
- Family: Ectolechiaceae
- Genus: Sporopodiopsis
- Species: S. sipmanii

Binomial name
- Sporopodiopsis sipmanii Sérus. (1997)

Species of lichen-forming fungus

Sporopodiopsis sipmanii is a species of foliicolous (leaf-dwelling), crustose lichen in the family Ectolechiaceae. Found in Sabah, Malaysia, it was formally described as a new species in 1997 by Belgian lichenologist Emmanuël Sérusiaux. The type specimen was collected by Harrie Sipman from Mount Kinabalu; the species name sipmanii acknowledges him. The lichen produces asexual spores (conidia) within curved, dorsiventral structures called campylidia; the presence of apothecia in addition to campylidia readily distinguishes it from the other species in the genus, Sporopodiopsis mortimeriana.
