= Enterographa dokdoensis =

Scientific classification
- Kingdom: Fungi
- Division: Ascomycota
- Class: Arthoniomycetes
- Order: Arthoniales
- Family: Roccellaceae
- Genus: Enterographa
- Species: E. dokdoensis

Binomial name
- Enterographa dokdoensis S.Y.Kondr., Lőkös, B.G.Lee & Hur (2020)
- Holotype site: Liancourt Rocks, South Korea

Species of lichen

Enterographa dokdoensis is a species of saxicolous (rock-dwelling), script lichen in the family Roccellaceae. It occurs in South Korea. The lichen has a thallus that can cover areas up to 5–10 cm in diameter, with a smooth to roughened texture and a green-grey to mauve colour.

== Taxonomy ==
Enterographa dokdoensis was formally described as a new species in 2020 by lichenologists Sergey Kondratyuk, Lőkös, Beeyoung-Gun Lee, and Jae-Seoun Hur. The type specimen of Enterographa dokdoensis was collected by the third author from the Liancourt Rocks in the Republic of Korea, specifically on the Eastern (Dokdo) Islet. This collection was made at the seashore, on the left side of the dock, where the lichen was found growing on rocks alongside Opegrapha ulleungdoensis. The elevation of the site is about 5 meters above sea level. The naming of dokdoensis alludes to its type locality – Dokdo (Eastern) Island of the Dokdo Islands in South Korea.

== Description ==
The thallus of Enterographa dokdoensis can cover areas up to 5–10 cm (2–4 in) in diameter or even larger. The thallus has a smooth to verrucose texture, a green-grey to mauve colour, and can reach a thickness of up to 200 μm. Occasionally, the thallus may display soredious spots. The photobiont of this species is Trentepohlia, with algal cells measuring 6.4–9.6 μm in diameter. The hypothallus of Enterographa dokdoensis is typically indistinct or absent.

The ascomata (fruiting bodies) of this lichen are open and shortly lirelline, sometimes branching, and measure 0.1–0.2 by 0.2–1.2 mm. They are rarely ellipsoid and not embedded in a stroma. The disc of the ascomata is mostly pale brown, occasionally darkening to a dark brownish hue, and is not pruinose. The thalline margin can be up to 32–50 μm wide. The exciple is very thin, ranging from 12 to 20 μm in width, and appears pale or yellowish. The hypothecium is hyaline and measures 25–50 μm in height. The hymenium is also hyaline and reaches a height of 50–60 μm. Paraphysoids within the hymenium are 0.8–1.0 mm wide, with their apices branching and anastomosing, particularly in the upper part, and expanding to about 15 μm wide. The epihymenium is 2–5 μm thick and contains yellowish crystals that are 2–5 μm in diameter.

The asci of Enterographa dokdoensis are cylindrical and contain eight spores. These ascospores are fusiform (threadlike) and not curved, typically with 3–5 septa, measuring 20.8–30.4 by 1.6–3.5 μm, and are surrounded by a thin perispore. The conidiomata are punctiform (point-like), up to 0.1 mm in diameter, and immersed in the thallus. They appear yellowish or brownish, with a pale yellowish wall in section. The conidia are filiform (threadlike) and curved, measuring 12–20 by 0.8 μm.

Chemically, the thallus of Enterographa dokdoensis reacts C+ (red), is K− and PD−, and UV+ (pale cream) to standard spot tests. Gyrophoric acid is present in this species.

== Similar species ==
Enterographa dokdoensis shares several characteristics with other species of the genus Enterographa, yet it can be distinguished by specific features. It is similar to the pantropical species E. leucolyta, which typically grows on shaded, coastal volcanic rocks. However, Enterographa dokdoensis differs in having a lower hymenium (50–60 μm vs. 120 μm), somewhat narrower and longer ascospores (20–30.5 by 1.6–3.5 μm vs. 18–27 by 2.5–4 μm), and shorter conidia (12–20 μm vs. 20–25 μm long).

There was a previous record of E. leucolyta from South Korea's Geumodo Island that might pertain to Enterographa dokdoensis. This is due to the much higher hymenium (120–130 μm) in the recorded specimens, which is unlike the typical hymenium height of E. leucolyta (55–100 μm). Additionally, Enterographa dokdoensis resembles the Australian epiphytic species E. divergens in its very thin, smooth or slightly wrinkled thallus. However, it differs in having a light whitish-grey thallus (as opposed to brownish-grey), indistinct apothecia, a light brown disc (instead of black), and shorter, narrower ascospores that are 3–5-septate (measuring 20.8–30.4 by 1.6–3.5 μm vs. 24–32 by 3–4 μm, 7-septate).

Enterographa dokdoensis is similar to E. praepallens from Japan, especially in the appearance of its apothecia and disc colour. It differs in having a thinner whitish-grey thallus and a lower hymenium. Its ascospores are almost the same as those of E. praepallens. Enterographa dokdoensis can also be compared to E. anguinella from Japan and the Philippines. It is distinguished by its matt whitish-grey thallus (as opposed to grey to light ochre and slightly shiny), indistinct apothecia, and shorter, narrower ascospores that are 3–5-septate (20.8–30.4 by 1.6–3.5 μm vs. 22–38 by 3–4 μm, 7–9-septate).
