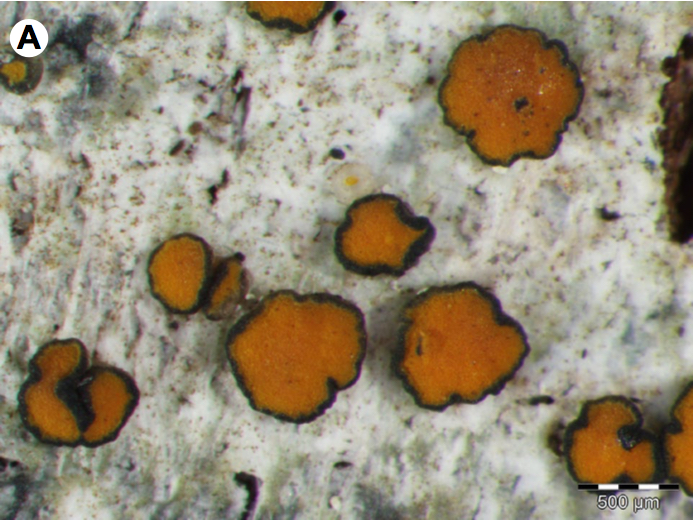
- Apothecia of Ikaeria serusiauxii grown in full light, showing completely black margins

Scientific classification
- Kingdom: Fungi
- Division: Ascomycota
- Class: Lecanoromycetes
- Order: Teloschistales
- Family: Teloschistaceae
- Genus: Ikaeria; S.Y.Kondr., Upreti & Hur (2017)

Type species
- Ikaeria aurantiellina (Harm.) S.Y.Kondr., Upreti & Hur (2017)

Species
- I. aurantiellina I. serusiauxii

= Ikaeria =

Genus of lichens

Ikaeria is a genus of crustose lichens with species in the family Teloschistaceae. Both species grow on the bark of twigs of shrubs and trees. It was circumscribed in 2017, with Ikaeria aurantiellina assigned as the type species. This lichen was previously placed in the genus Caloplaca, but molecular analysis showed that it belonged in a lineage that was genetically distinct from that genus. Ikaeria serusiauxii was added to the genus in 2020. The genus is found in Macaronesia (the Canary Islands and Madeira) and nearby mainland Portugal, where both species grow on twigs and branches in coastal areas. These lichens favour sunny, dry locations and can colonise both native shrubs and introduced conifers.

== Taxonomy ==
Ikaeria was introduced in 2017 by the lichenologists Sergey Kondratyuk, Dalip Kumar Upreti, and Jae-Seoun Hur as a monophyletic lineage within the Teloschistaceae based on a three-gene phylogeny (nrITS, nrLSU and mtSSU), with Ikaeria aurantiellina designated as the type species. The authors placed the genus in the subfamily Teloschistoideae and noted that it is often recovered as sister to Yoshimuria in combined analyses, although support for a shared clade varies with sampling. They diagnosed Ikaeria by its zeorine to lecanorine apothecia and polarilocular spores, and indicated a corticolous (bark-dwelling) habit on twigs and branches of shrubs or trees. The name commemorates the Swedish lichenologist Ingvar Kärnefelt. Kondratyuk and colleagues also recorded that some workers had treated Caloplaca aegatica as conspecific with I. aurantiellina, a view they relayed as a published suggestion rather than a formal act.

Harrie Sipman and André Aptroot subsequently expanded the genus in 2020 by describing Ikaeria serusiauxii from Macaronesia and mainland Portugal; ITS data placed the new species as the closest relative of I. aurantiellina. Their analyses, and the multilocus results they cite, confirm that Ikaeria belongs to Teloschistoideae, not to Caloplacoideae or Xanthorioideae where many crustose "Caloplaca" species had historically been filed. Within Teloschistoideae, Ikaeria sits near Yoshimuria in the teloschistoid clade. They also contrasted Ikaeria with superficially similar teloschistoid genera discussed by Kondratyuk and colleagues, noting that proposed relatives such as Fominiella are not closely allied in their phylogenetic trees.

== Description ==
Species of Ikaeria form a crustose, continuous thallus that is pale yellowish to greyish or whitish-yellow. The sexual fruiting bodies (apothecia) are zeorine to lecanorine, i.e. with a thallus-derived rim or a transitional rim, and bear orange to brownish-orange discs. The rim around the disc (the true exciple) is composed of interwoven hyphae (textura intricata) or a somewhat thick-walled, scleroplectenchymatous tissue. Asci contain eight ascospores, which are polarilocular—two compartments linked by a narrow isthmus. Paraphyses are often broom-like and tend to darken towards their tips.

Chemical characters were not assessed in the original diagnosis, but subsequent work on I. serusiauxii reports an absence of anthraquinones in the thallus and apothecial margin, black-pigmented pycnidial ostioles, and a dark olive-green cortical pigment (cinereorufa-green; epithecium K+ (violet).

== Habitat and distribution ==
Kondratyuk and colleagues reported Ikaeria as a corticolous genus growing on the bark of twigs and small branches of shrubs and trees. In the same account they recorded the genus from the Canary Islands and indicated that the type species I. aurantiellina was known from the Canary Islands as well as south-western Europe.

Sipman and Aptroot later added I. serusiauxii, documenting the genus in Macaronesia (Madeira Archipelago and Canary Islands) and on the nearby mainland of Portugal (Algarve). They found it on twigs and branches in open, rather xerophytic, coastal vegetation, including on native shrubs such as Euphorbia piscatoria and on introduced conifers (Cupressus, Pinus); Macaronesian records are from mid-elevations (about 350–400 m on Porto Santo Island; 500–575 m on Madeira), whereas the Portuguese localities are close to the seashore.

== Species ==
- Ikaeria aurantiellina (Harm.) S.Y.Kondr., Upreti & Hur (2017) – Canary Islands; south-western Europe
- Ikaeria serusiauxii Sipman (2020) – Macaronesia and mainland Portugal
