= Bryogomphus =

Scientific classification
- Kingdom: Fungi
- Division: Ascomycota
- Class: Lecanoromycetes
- Order: Lecanorales
- Family: Ectolechiaceae
- Genus: Bryogomphus; Lücking, W.R.Buck, Sérus. & L.I.Ferraro (2005)
- Species: B. caribaeus

Binomial name
- Bryogomphus caribaeus (W.R.Buck) Lücking, W.R.Buck, Sérus. & L.I.Ferraro (2005)

Synonyms
- Gomphillus caribaeus W.R.Buck (1998)

Single-species fungal genus

Bryogomphus is a fungal genus in the family Ectolechiaceae. It is a monospecific genus, containing the single species Bryogomphus caribaeus. The genus was established in 2005 when it was discovered that a previously described species did not belong in its original classification. This small lichen grows exclusively on moss in the humid mountain forests of the Caribbean, particularly in Guadeloupe.

== Taxonomy ==
Bryogomphus was circumscribed in 2005 by Robert Lücking, William Russel Buck, Emmanuël Sérusiaux and Lidia Ferraro after a re-examination showed that Gomphillus caribaeus—described only seven years earlier—did not belong in the Gomphillaceae. The authors moved that species to the newly erected genus as the type, thereby creating Bryogomphus caribaeus. Molecular data were unavailable at the time, but a suite of striking anatomical characters already set the taxon apart from lookalikes in Gomphillus and Bapalmuia: the apothecia are turbinate (nail-shaped) with a disc-shaped top, the paraphyses are richly branched and knit a lattice round each ascus, and the asci themselves stain deep blue with iodine (an amyloid reaction) and match the so-called Sporopodium type. These features, together with its muscicolous ecology, were the justification for placing Bryogomphus in the Ectolechiaceae, although its precise sister group inside that family remains unresolved; it differs from Bapalmuia by the net-like (reticulate) paraphyses and amyloid ascus apex, and from Gomphillus by the iodine-positive asci and a prosoplectenchymatous excipulum.

== Description ==
The thallus is thin, smooth to slightly powdery (farinose) and lacks a true cortex, giving it a greyish film on the moss it inhabits; no secondary propagules or protective skin are developed. The internal photobiont alga is a green Trebouxia-type cell layer. Apothecia (fruiting bodies) arise as miniature turrets that grow vertically, forming pale flanks and a dark, flat to gently convex disc at the tip; their shape recalls tiny drawing-pins. Under the microscope the rim (excipulum) is built of thick-walled fungal cells arranged like a labyrinth and clothed externally in fine, cottony hyphae. Inside, abundantly branched paraphyses weave a mesh round the very elongate asci; when stained with iodine only the asci turn a uniform blue, a diagnostic reaction for the Sporopodium-type ascus. Each ascus releases thread-like ascospores 300–400 μm long and 3–5 μm wide, divided by many cross-walls (septa); no asexual pycnidia or conidia have been observed.

== Habitat and distribution ==
Bryogomphus caribaeus is a bryophilous specialist that grows directly on living moss cushions or on moss-covered bark and soil. All confirmed collections come from the Lesser Antilles, especially the humid montane forests of Basse-Terre (Guadeloupe) between about 450 m and 1,000 m elevation, where the climate is perennially moist and cool under an evergreen canopy. Additional records from Saint Lucia and related bryophyte-rich habitats suggest a Caribbean distribution, and the genus has not yet been reported outside this region. Field records show the species restricted to mossy substrates in moist, montane forests.
