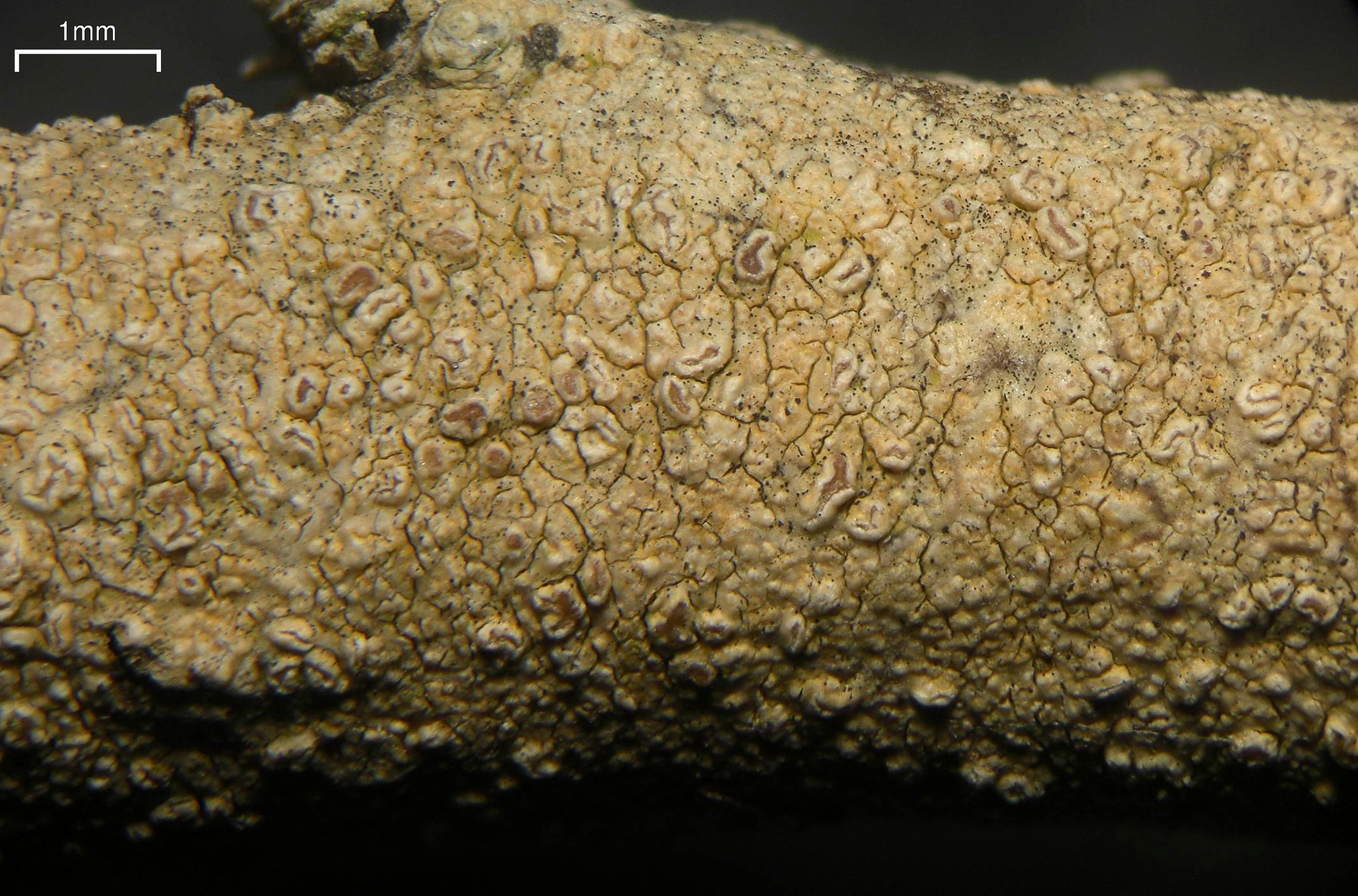
- Nyungwea anguinella

Scientific classification
- Domain: Eukaryota
- Kingdom: Fungi
- Division: Ascomycota
- Class: Arthoniomycetes
- Order: Arthoniales
- Family: Opegraphaceae
- Genus: Nyungwea; Sérus., Eb.Fischer & Killmann (2006)

Type species
- Nyungwea pallida Sérus., Eb.Fischer & Killmann (2006)

Species
- N. anguinella N. pallida N. pycnidiata N. pyneei

= Nyungwea =

Genus of lichens

Nyungwea is a genus of lichen-forming fungi in the family Opegraphaceae. The genus was established in 2006 based on a distinctive species from East African rainforests and now includes four species found across tropical regions from Brazil to Mauritius. These lichens grow as extremely thin crusts on tree bark and produce tiny upright stalks that create and release small packages containing both fungal and algal cells for reproduction. They are found exclusively in humid tropical environments, with most species living on the smooth bark of trees in shaded forests, though one species has adapted to grow on termite nests in the Amazon rainforest.

== Taxonomy ==
The genus was circumscribed in 2006 by Emmanuël Sérusiaux, Eberhard Fischer, and Dorothee Killmann, to accommodate the distinctive East-African species N. pallida, a bark-dwelling crust whose minute stalks bear goniocyst diaspores. Originally published as an incertae sedis member of the order Arthoniales, subsequent multilocus studies have shown that the genus belongs to the family Opegraphaceae, where it forms a well-supported clade alongside Neosergipea and related tropical lineages.

The genus remained monotypic until 2017, when André Aptroot and Marcela Cáceres described N. pycnidiata from termite nests in the Brazilian Amazon and, in the same paper, transferred the long-misplaced Stigmatidium anguinellum to Nyungwea as N. anguinella. These additions extended the geographic range of the genus from equatorial Africa to South America and revealed, for the first time, the structure of its fertile pycnidia and apothecia.

A further expansion followed in 2020, when Damien Ertz and Paul Diederich discovered N. pyneei on coastal vegetation in Mauritius while compiling a national lichen checklist. Their phylogenetic analyses confirmed its close affinity to the African type species and cemented the trans-oceanic distribution pattern now seen in the genus.

== Description ==
Nyungwea grows as an extremely thin, bark-dwelling (corticolous) crust that is partly immersed in the outer layers of its woody host. When damp the thallus appears pale to deep green, sometimes with a bluish tinge, but it can look almost white when dry; a separate prothallus is absent. Minute wart-like swellings (up to about 0.2 mm across) pepper the surface and contain colourless crystals. The lichen partners with the filamentous green alga genus Trentepohlia, which threads through the fungal tissue and provides the photosynthetic component.

From this crust arise numerous delicate stalks (stipes) that seldom exceed 1.0 mm in height and 0.2 mm in thickness. These stalks are pale yellow to orange—sometimes pinkish when wet—and develop a frayed, brush-like tip. Along the upper part of each stipe the fungus fashions tiny spherical propagules called goniocysts (7–12 μm in diameter). Each goniocyst consists of a single Trentepohlia cell tightly wrapped in a short web of fungal hyphae, so the alga and fungus disperse together as a ready-made "starter kit" for a new lichen. When the goniocysts mature they readily detach, leaving the stipe tip looking like a tuft of bare white filaments.

Microscopically, the stipe hyphae are slender (1–1.5 μm wide), septate, and often anastomose to form a loose network that is interlaced with rows of narrowly constricted Trentepohlia cells. Standard spot tests show the thallus is K−, C+ (red), and PD−, and thin-layer chromatography detects lecanoric acid as the principal secondary metabolite.

== Habitat and distribution ==
Members of Nyungwea are confined to the humid tropics, where they grow as an inconspicuous crust that sends up millimetre-high stalks packed with ready-made goniocyst propagules. Most species colonise the smooth bark of living trees in shaded, rain-moistened forest or coastal scrub, but one, N. pycnidiata, has evolved to exploit the stable, aerated surfaces of arboreal termite nests in Amazonia. In all sites the lichen favours substrates that remain damp yet well-lit enough for its green-algal partner (Trentepohlia) to photosynthesise; chemical spot tests suggest broadly similar secondary metabolite profiles across the genus.

The four accepted species show a disjunct trans-oceanic range. The type species N. pallida is restricted to montane rainforests of East Africa, being recorded from Rwanda's Nyungwe Forest and Uganda's Mabira Forest. N. anguinella occurs in lowland and sub-montane Atlantic and Amazonian forests of Brazil, with collections from Sergipe, Mato Grosso do Sul and Santa Catarina. N. pycnidiata is likewise Amazonian but so far known only from the State of Amapá, where it exclusively coats termite nests high in the canopy. The most remote outlier, N. pyneei, inhabits coastal thickets on Mauritius, hinting that long-distance dispersal across the Indian Ocean has played a part in the genus's history.

== Species ==
As of June 2025, Species Fungorum (in the Catalogue of Life) accept four species of Nyungwea:

- Nyungwea anguinella (Nyl.) Aptroot (2017)
- Nyungwea pallida Sérus., Eb.Fisch. & Killmann (2006) – Africa
- Nyungwea pycnidiata Aptroot & M.Cáceres (2017) – Brazil
- Nyungwea pyneei Ertz & Diederich (2020)
