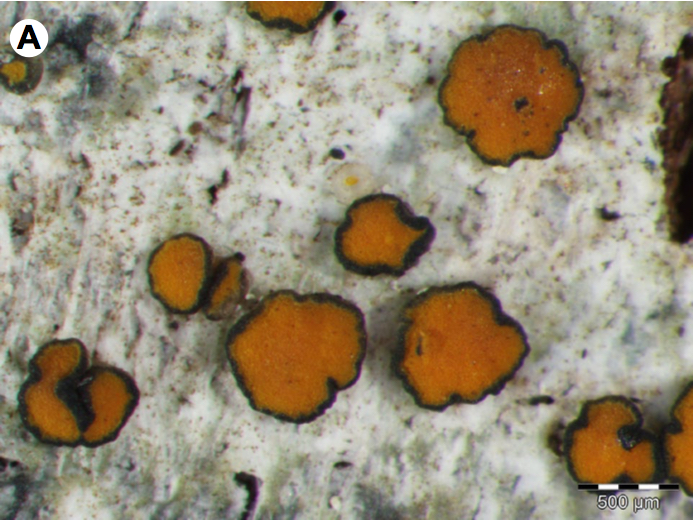
- Apothecia of Ikaeria serusiauxii grown in full light, showing completely black margins

Scientific classification
- Domain: Eukaryota
- Kingdom: Fungi
- Division: Ascomycota
- Class: Lecanoromycetes
- Order: Teloschistales
- Family: Teloschistaceae
- Genus: Ikaeria
- Species: I. serusiauxii

Binomial name
- Ikaeria serusiauxii Sipman (2020)

= Ikaeria serusiauxii =

Species of lichen

Ikaeria serusiauxii is a species of crustose lichen in the family Teloschistaceae. It is found in the Madeira Archipelago and Canary Islands (Macaronesia), as well as in coastal regions of Algarve and Estremadura in mainland Portugal, where it grows on twigs and branches of trees and shrubs.

== Taxonomy ==
It was described as a new species in 2020 by the Dutch lichenologist Harrie Sipman. The type specimen was found on Porto Santo Island, on the lower slopes of Pico do Facho, at an altitude of about 350 m (1,150 ft). Here it was growing on fallen pine trees. The specific epithet honours Belgian lichenologist Emmanuël Sérusiaux, "who contributed significantly to the exploration of the lichen diversity of Macaronesia".

Molecular phylogenetic analysis showed its close relationship to the Canary Island endemic Ikaeria aurantiellina, and so it was placed in Ikaeria, a genus circumscribed in 2017.

== Description ==
Ikaeria serusiauxii has a continuous thallus (main body) about 1–3 cm wide, typically grey in colour, sometimes showin greenish or brownish tinges in shaded areas. The thallus surface is smooth and slightly glossy, roughly 0.05 mm thick, lacking both soredia and blastidia (vegetative reproductive structures). It appears flat or slightly warty with low protuberances measuring 0.1–0.2 mm in width. A distinctive black prothallus (initial growth area) is visible along the thallus margins and on abraded spots. The internal structure includes a 10–20 μm thick prosoplectenchymatous cortex (composed of parallel hyphae), a discontinuous algal layer about 30–50 μm thick, and no medulla.

The lichen produces abundant zeorine apothecia (reproductive structures with both thalline and proper exciple) measuring approximately 0.5–0.8 mm in diameter. Larger apothecia typically subdivide into several marginate discs forming convex groups. These apothecia are sessile (attached directly to the surface) and lack pruina (powdery coating). The disc is flat to slightly convex with an orange colouration. The margin varies in colour from completely black to greenish grey, more commonly appearing as greenish grey with black spots in the marginal crenulations (scalloped edges). This margin is raised above the disc when young but becomes somewhat reduced in older apothecia.

The internal structure of the apothecia includes a prosoplectenchymatous true exciple and hypothecium measuring approximately 10–30 μm thick, and a thalline exciple about 100 μm thick. The cortical layer measures about 50 μm thick at the base, becoming thinner laterally, and is composed of dense, branching, anticlinal hyphae. The algal layer is approximately 50 μm thick, interrupted, containing Trebouxia-like green algae about 6–10 μm in diameter. The epihymenium (uppermost layer of the reproductive structure) is orange and granular, while the hymenium (spore-producing layer) is 50–60 μm thick and hyaline (transparent). The paraphyses (sterile filaments) are mostly simple, about 2 μm wide, with slightly swollen tips up to 3 μm that branch dichotomously a few times. The ascospores are polarilocular (with thickened ends) and ellipsoid, measuring approximately 12–16 by 6–8 μm, with a septum width of 8–12 μm.

When subjected to chemical tests, the black parts of the apothecia, the pycnidium ostiole, and the prothallus contain a dark olive-green pigment (Cinereorufa-green) that turns more greenish but persists in potassium hydroxide solution (K). The epithecium turns violet in K, releasing clouds of fine violet crystals (unidentified anthraquinones), while the thallus and apothecium margin lack anthraquinones, showing no reaction with K. Scattered, rather sparse pycnidia (asexual reproductive structures) are immersed with raised black ostioles, producing bacilliform conidia measuring about 3.5 by 0.8 μm.

== Habitat and distribution ==
Ikaeria serusiauxii is found in Macaronesia, specifically within the Madeira Archipelago and Canary Islands, as well as in mainland Portugal (Algarve and Estremadura regions). This lichen species typically grows on twigs and branches of trees and shrubs in open, relatively dry (xerophytic) vegetation environments. It has been documented growing on native species such as Euphorbia piscatoria, as well as on introduced Cupressus and Pinus trees.

On the island of Porto Santo, I. serusiauxii is relatively common at elevations between 350 and 400 metres above sea level. On Madeira Island itself, only two records had been documented at the time of its original publication, occurring at elevations between 500 and 575 metres above sea level. In contrast, the populations found in mainland Portugal are located in coastal areas close to the seashore.
