= Pseudopyrenula miniflavida =

Scientific classification
- Kingdom: Fungi
- Division: Ascomycota
- Class: Dothideomycetes
- Order: Trypetheliales
- Family: Trypetheliaceae
- Genus: Pseudopyrenula
- Species: P. miniflavida

Binomial name
- Pseudopyrenula miniflavida Aptroot & A.D.Nunes (2019)

Species of lichen

Pseudopyrenula miniflavida is a species of corticolous (bark-dwelling) lichen in the family Trypetheliaceae. Found in Brazil, it was formally described as a new species in 2019 by lichenologists André Aptroot and A.D.Nunes. The type specimen was collected from Mata do IFS (Quissamã, Sergipe) at an altitude of 50 m (160 ft). The lichen has a whitish-grey thallus without a cortex. It has hemispherical ascomata that are mostly black but sometimes partly covered with a whitish pruina. The hamathecium (i.e., all of the fungal hyphae or other tissues between asci) contains yellow oil droplets that dissolve but do not change colour in a solution of KOH. The ascospores are hyaline with three septa and measure 15–17 by 5.5–6.5 μm. The specific epithet miniflavida alludes to both its small spores (the smallest in genus Pseudopyrenula) as well as the characteristic yellow oil droplets in the hamathecium.
