= Pseudopyrenula hexamera =

Scientific classification
- Kingdom: Fungi
- Division: Ascomycota
- Class: Dothideomycetes
- Order: Trypetheliales
- Family: Trypetheliaceae
- Genus: Pseudopyrenula
- Species: P. hexamera

Binomial name
- Pseudopyrenula hexamera Aptroot (2016)

Species of lichen

Pseudopyrenula hexamera is a species of bark-dwelling, crustose lichen in the family Trypetheliaceae. It is distinguished within its genus by having five-septate spores, a unique feature among Pseudopyrenula species. The species is known only from Venezuela, where it was collected in lowland Amazonian rainforest.

== Taxonomy ==
The species was formally described from a type specimen collected on the west bank of the Surumoni River, near Esmeralda in the Alto Orinoco region of Amazonas state, Venezuela, at an elevation of 110 m (360 ft). The specimen was found on the bark of a tree in the genus Qualea. It is the only member of Pseudopyrenula with consistently five-septate ascospores. While it resembles Polymeridium quinqueseptatum, it differs by the thickened walls of its spores, which give rise to the diamond-shaped internal cavities (lumina) typical of Pseudopyrenula.

== Description ==
The thallus is thin, whitish, and lacks a distinct outer cortex (ecorticate). The fruiting bodies (ascomata) are produced singly or occasionally in small lateral groups; they are hemispherical, black, and about 0.2 mm in diameter, with a tiny apical pore (ostiole) that is also black. The internal tissue (hamathecium) is clear and colourless, without oil droplets (not inspersed). Each ascus contains eight colourless ascospores that are divided by five cross-walls (5-septate). The spores measure 16–21 × 6–7 μm, have smooth walls, are surrounded by a thin gelatinous sheath about 1 μm thick, and display diamond-shaped lumina created by thickening of the inner spore wall.

The thallus does not fluoresce under ultraviolet light (UV−), and thin-layer chromatography detected no secondary metabolites.

== Habitat and distribution ==
Pseudopyrenula hexamera has been collected on smooth bark of rainforest trees and is known only from its type locality in Venezuela (Amazonas state, Alto Orinoco).
