= Neosergipea septoconidiata =

Scientific classification
- Domain: Eukaryota
- Kingdom: Fungi
- Division: Ascomycota
- Class: Arthoniomycetes
- Order: Arthoniales
- Family: Roccellaceae
- Genus: Neosergipea
- Species: N. septoconidiata

Binomial name
- Neosergipea septoconidiata Aptroot & M.Cáceres (2017)

Species of lichen

Neosergipea septoconidiata is a species of corticolous (bark-dwelling) lichen in the family Roccellaceae. It is a unique species of lichen that grows on the bark of trees in the primary forests of Brazil with its bluish-grey thallus and bright orange pycnidia that have a fluffy hyphal surface.

== Taxonomy ==
Neosergipea septoconidiata was first described scientifically in 2017 by lichenologists André Aptroot and Marcela Cáceres, who discovered the type specimen in the Reserva Extrativista Maracá in (Mazagão, Amapá, Brazil). The species was given the epithet septoconidiata, which is derived from its distinctive septate conidia, referring to the asexual spores (ascospores) that have one or more internal partitions, or "septa", dividing their internal structure.

The authors placed the species in the genus Neosergipea, which was originally circumscribed with the name Sergipea. The name was updated due to the pre-existence of a fossil dinoflagellate spore genus named Sergipea; Robert Lücking and colleagues renamed the genus to Neosergipea in 2016.

== Description ==
Neosergipea septoconidiata is characterised by a bluish-grey to olivaceous thallus, or the body of the lichen, which is less than 0.1 mm thick. The thallus is usually encircled by a somewhat hyphal brown prothallus, approximately 0.3 mm wide. The medulla or internal layer of the lichen is filled with large, hyaline, or transparent calcium oxalate crystals, which is a distinctive feature of this species. The hyphae, or the filamentous cells of the lichen, are hyaline, somewhat curvy, branched, and septate, measuring 1–2 μm in width.

One of the distinctive characteristics of this species is the vibrant orange-yellow to orange pycnidia These structures, which are mostly conical and have a fluffy hyphal surface, are abundant in Neosergipea septoconidiata. Notably, the conidia or asexual spores of this lichen are hyaline, 3–6-septate, filiform or thread-like, and have rounded ends. Their dimensions range from 12 to 23 by 1.5–2.0 μm, setting them apart from other species.

Neosergipea septoconidiata shares the bright orange-yellow to orange colouration with N. aurata, the type species of Neosergipea. However, it stands apart due to its unique conidiomata with septate conidia of varying lengths but constant width. While ascomata (sexual reproductive structures) have not been observed in this species, the abundance of pycnidia (asexual reproductive structures) sets it apart. Young specimens primarily show immature pycnidia, and while there is some variation in colour, the chemistry remains consistent across specimens.

== Chemistry ==
Neosergipea septoconidiata does not fluoresce under UV light and its thallus exhibits no reactions to common chemical spot tests. However, its pycnidia show a pink fluorescence under UV light and turn blood red when exposed to a solution of potassium hydroxide (K+). Thin-layer chromatography suggests the presence of an anthraquinone compound, probably parietin, a pigment found in some lichens.

== Habitat and distribution ==
Neosergipea septoconidiata is known to inhabit the bark of trees in tall primary forests. As of now, this lichen species has only been found in Brazil. Its presence has been reported in the states of Amazonas and Pará, suggesting that it could be widespread in the Amazon region.
