= Neosergipea =

Scientific classification
- Domain: Eukaryota
- Kingdom: Fungi
- Division: Ascomycota
- Class: Arthoniomycetes
- Order: Arthoniales
- Family: Roccellaceae
- Genus: Neosergipea; M.Cáceres, Ertz & Aptroot (2016)

Type species
- Neosergipea aurata (M.Cáceres, Ertz & Aptroot) Lücking, M.C.Gut. & B.Moncada (2016)

Species
- N. aurata N. bicolor N. hyphosa N. septoconidiata

Synonyms
- Sergipea M.Cáceres, Ertz & Aptroot (2013)

Genus of lichens

Neosergipea is a genus of lichen-forming fungi in the family Roccellaceae. It has four species, all of which are corticolous (bark-dwelling), crustose lichens that are found in the tropical forests of Brazil. This genus is related to the genera Dichosporidium, Enterographa, and Erythrodecton. It distinguishes itself through unique morphological characteristics and certain chemical constituents, in particular, its non-carbonised ascomata and the presence of a vivid orange anthraquinone compound.

== Taxonomy ==
The type species of the genus, Neosergipea aurata, was found in Areia Branca, Sergipe (northeastern Brazil), during ecological studies on epiphytic crustose lichens. The original name of the genus, Sergipea, was derived from this location. It was later found, however, that this name had been previously used for a genus of fossil pollen, requiring a new name for this lichen genus. As a result, the replacement name Neosergipea was introduced.

Neosergipea is a part of the family Roccellaceae and finds its place in the phylogenetic tree close to the genera Dichosporidium and Erythrodecton. The tree reveals that Neosergipea is strongly associated with the genus Enterographa, sharing characteristics such as the presence of an anthraquinone. However, Sergipea differed in several respects from both these genera, particularly by the firm, not byssoid thallus, the absence of ascoma carbonization, and the ascospore type. An updated phylogenetic analysis including all available mitochondrial DNA sequence data showed Neosergipea as a sister genus to Dichosporidium, with Erythrodecton as the basal genus in the clade. Dichosporidium appeared to include two distinct entities (genera or subgenera), one with D. nigrocinctum and the other with D. boschianum and D. brunnthaleri.

== Description ==
The thallus of Neosergipea is crustose and closely follows the bark surface. It is dull and pale greenish-grey, very thin, and interspersed with a slightly byssoid hypothallus. The ascomata is approximately 0.1 mm in diameter and is not carbonised. Its excipulum is hyaline, and the epihymenium has pale brown internal pigmentation and external orange crystals. The asci are cylindrical to clavate (club-shaped), measuring 73–89 by 21–27 μm.

Neosergipea is recognised by its non-carbonised ascomata immersed in stromata – structures that exhibit a bright orange colour due to the presence of an anthraquinone. Its ascospores have between 7 and 9 septa, are narrowly clavate and thick-walled with elongated lumina, and typically have dimensions of 35–40 by 5–6 μm.

The lichen's chemical composition includes lichexanthone in the thallus and an unidentified anthraquinone in the stromata, similar to parietin in terms of its Rf-value and KOH-reaction.

== Habitat and distribution ==
Neosergipea is known to grow on the smooth bark of trees in Caatinga forest, a unique semi-arid biome in northeastern Brazil. To date, this lichen genus has only been reported from Brazil. It often grows alongside the similarly endemic species Enterographa subquassiaecola. The original species of the genus, Neosergipea aurata, was discovered in a remnant of Atlantic transition forest in Sergipe, Brazil.

== Species ==
Following the initial discovery of Neosergipea aurata, three other species have been identified within the genus. Each of these possesses the defining characteristics of Neosergipea, such as a crustose thallus, non-carbonised ascomata, and the presence of an orange anthraquinone, but they also display unique features.

- Neosergipea aurata (M.Cáceres, Ertz & Aptroot) Lücking, M.C.Gut. & B.Moncada (2016)
- Neosergipea bicolor Aptroot & M.Cáceres (2017)
- Neosergipea hyphosa Aptroot & M.Cáceres (2017)
- Neosergipea septoconidiata Aptroot & M.Cáceres (2017)
