= Pseudopyrenula flavoreagens =

Scientific classification
- Kingdom: Fungi
- Division: Ascomycota
- Class: Dothideomycetes
- Order: Trypetheliales
- Family: Trypetheliaceae
- Genus: Pseudopyrenula
- Species: P. flavoreagens

Binomial name
- Pseudopyrenula flavoreagens Aptroot & M.Cáceres (2016)
- Holotype: Lago Cujubim, Rondônia, Brazil

Species of lichen

Pseudopyrenula flavoreagens is a species of corticolous (bark-dwelling), crustose lichen in the family Trypetheliaceae. It is found in Brazil and Panama, in both primary forest and disturbed rainforests.

== Taxonomy ==
The lichen was formally described as a new species in 2016 by the lichenologists André Aptroot and Marcela Cáceres. The type specimen was collected from within the state of Rondônia at the Sítio Ecológico Buriti, located on Lago Cujubim, northeast of Porto Velho. This specimen was found at an approximate elevation of 100 m (330 ft), growing on tree bark within a disturbed rainforest area. The collection was made by the authors on 18 November 2012. It has also been recorded from Panama.

== Description ==
Pseudopyrenula flavoreagens is characterised by a thallus that lacks a protective outer cortex, presenting a dull and continuous surface that can cover areas up to 2 cm in diameter. Its colour is a whitish grey, distinctly outlined by a black line known as the hypothallus, approximately 0.2 mm wide, which does not lead to the formation of galls (abnormal growths) on the host bark.

The reproductive structures of the lichen, known as ascomata, are spherical, ranging in size from 0.25 to 0.35 mm in diameter, and they emerge singly from the thallus. The wall of these structures is carbonised, up to 40 μm thick, with the ostioles (openings) located at the top, remaining separate, flat, and black in colour. Inside, the hamathecium (the tissue between the spore-producing asci) contains yellow oil globules. Each ascus holds eight ascospores, which are clear (hyaline), segmented into three parts (3-septate), spindle-shaped (fusiform), and measure 21–28 by 6–9 μm. The spores have pointed ends, diamond-shaped internal spaces (lumina), and are partly yellow, lacking a gelatinous surrounding layer. Pycnidia, which are another form of reproductive structure, were not observed to occur in this species.

From a chemical perspective, the thallus displays a yellow fluorescence] under UV light (UV+ yellow). Thin-layer chromatography analysis reveals the presence of lichexanthone, a secondary metabolite in the chemical class known as xanthones.

Pseudopyrenula flavoreagensis similar in appearance to P. subgregaria, but the latter species does not have lichexanthone.
