= Pseudopyrenula guianensis =

Scientific classification
- Kingdom: Fungi
- Division: Ascomycota
- Class: Dothideomycetes
- Order: Trypetheliales
- Family: Trypetheliaceae
- Genus: Pseudopyrenula
- Species: P. guianensis

Binomial name
- Pseudopyrenula guianensis Aptroot (2016)

Species of lichen

Pseudopyrenula guianensis is a species of corticolous (bark-dwelling), crustose lichen in the family Trypetheliaceae. It is known from lowland rainforest in northern South America, with records from French Guiana (type locality near Saül) and Suriname.

== Taxonomy ==
The species belongs to the Pseudopyrenula subgregaria group (the smaller-spored, 3-septate Pseudopyrenula). It is distinguished within that assemblage by two features used by lichenologists for identification: a clear but oil-dotted internal matrix (a hyaline hamathecium with inspersion) and the presence of the fluorescent compound lichexanthone in the thallus. The type collection was made in 1986 near Saül, French Guiana.

== Description ==
The thallus is thin, whitish and ecorticate (lacking a differentiated outer cortex). Sexual fruiting bodies (ascomata) are produced singly; they are black, hemispherical, and 0.3–0.5 mm in diameter, each with a tiny pore at the top (an apical ostiole). Inside, the hamathecium is colourless but contains scattered oil droplets (inspersion). The ascospores are colourless, divided by three cross-walls (3-septate), and measure 21–25 × 6–9 μm; they are smooth-walled and show diamond-shaped internal cavities (lumina) formed by thickening of the inner spore wall.

The thallus is UV-positive yellow under long-wave ultraviolet light, indicating lichexanthone; thin-layer chromatography confirms this compound.

== Habitat and distribution ==
Pseudopyrenula guianensis grows on smooth bark of trees in rainforest. It is confirmed from French Guiana and Suriname.
