= Arthotheliopsis =

Scientific classification
- Kingdom: Fungi
- Division: Ascomycota
- Class: Lecanoromycetes
- Order: Graphidales
- Family: Gomphillaceae
- Genus: Arthotheliopsis; Vain. (1896)

Type species
- Arthotheliopsis hymenocarpoides Vain. (1896)

Species
- A. floridensis A. hymenocarpoides A. planicarpa A. serusiauxii A. tricharioides

Genus of lichen-forming fungi

Arthotheliopsis is a genus of fungi in the family Gomphillaceae. It comprises five species of crustose lichens. The genus was introduced by the Finnish lichenologist Edvard August Vainio in 1896, with A. hymenocarpoides assigned as the type species.

== Taxonomy ==
Vainio circumscribed the genus in 1896 for a group of small, rather inconspicuous crustose lichens with a simple construction: the thallus is thin and homoiomerous (i.e. it lacks a differentiated cortex), formed by tightly interwoven, thin-walled hyphae and containing a green, protococcoid green alga as the photobiont. The fruiting bodies are minute, round and flat, and they develop immersed in the thallus; he emphasised that they have only a very thin lateral exciple and no true perithecial wall. The hymenium bears numerous paraphyses that may be simple or sparsely branched, and the ascospores are colourless, elongate to spindle-shaped, divided by several septa or sometimes with a muriform (brick-like) pattern.

Vainio selected Arthotheliopsis hymenocarpoides as the type species and described it from tropical America on the surfaces of tree leaves, emphasising the genus's foliicolous habit. In diagnosing Arthotheliopsis, he contrasted it with superficially similar arthonioid genera (such as Chiodecton, Arthonia and Lecanactis), noting the combination of an immersed, membranous apothecium, a very thin lateral exciple, and colourless multi-septate spores as the features that set it apart.

== Species ==
As of December 2025, Species Fungorum (in the Catalogue of Life) accepts five species of Arthotheliopsis:

- Arthotheliopsis floridensis Lücking & W.R.Buck (2007)
- Arthotheliopsis hymenocarpoides Vain. (1896)
- Arthotheliopsis planicarpa (Lücking) Lücking, Sérus. & Vězda (2005)
- Arthotheliopsis serusiauxii (Lücking) Lücking, Sérus. & Vězda (2005)
- Arthotheliopsis tricharioides (Kalb & Vězda) Lücking, Sérus. & Vězda (2005)
