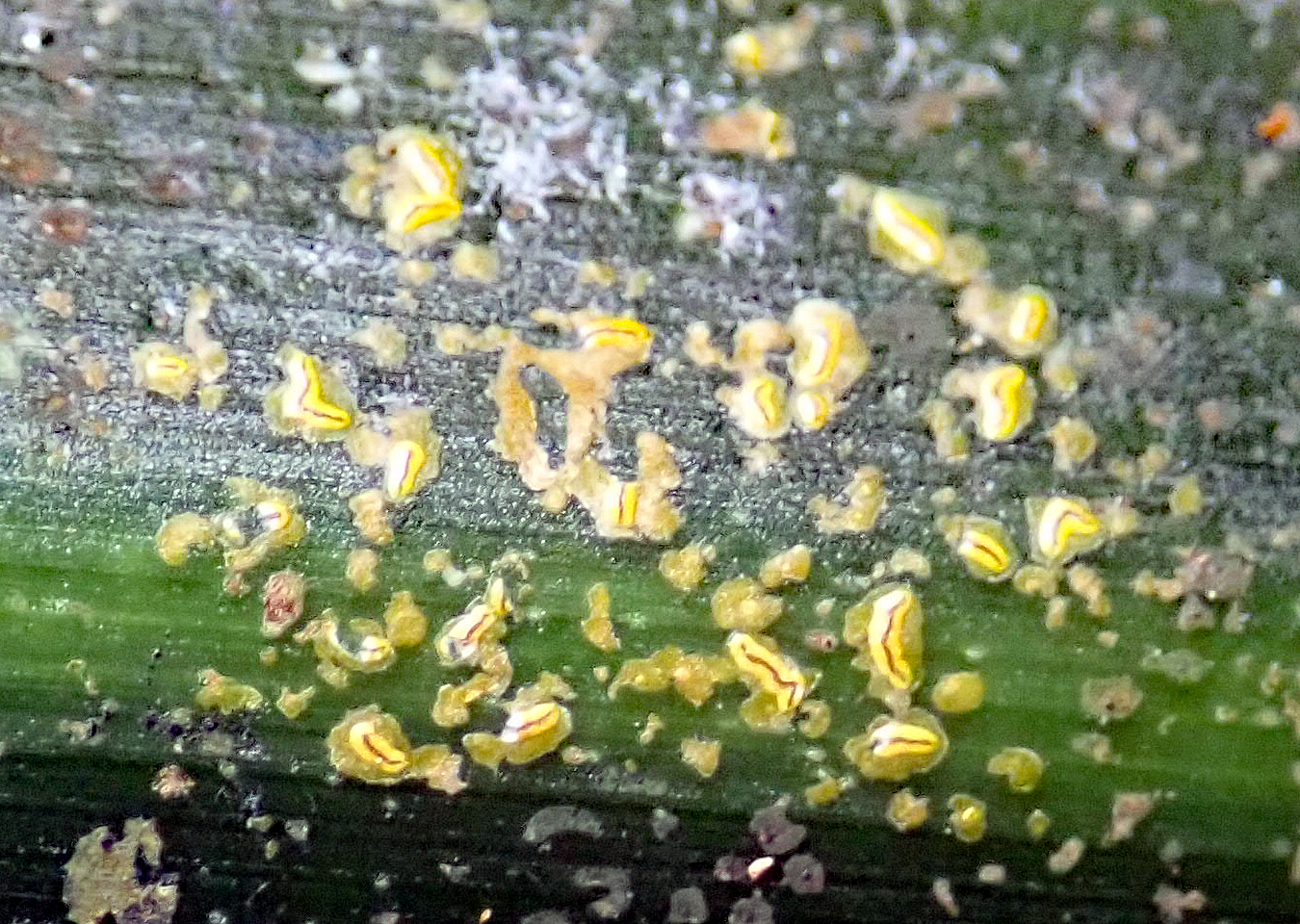

Scientific classification
- Domain: Eukaryota
- Kingdom: Fungi
- Division: Ascomycota
- Class: Arthoniomycetes
- Order: Arthoniales
- Family: Roccellaceae
- Genus: Enterographa
- Species: E. bella

Binomial name
- Enterographa bella R.Sant. (1952)

= Enterographa bella =

Species of lichen

Enterographa bella is a species of foliicolous (leaf-dwelling) lichen in the family Roccellaceae. The lichen is characterised by its orange-brown, often wavy lirellae (fruiting bodies). Its photobiont partner is from the green algal genus Phycopeltis.

== Taxonomy ==
The lichen was formally described as a new species in 1952 by the Swedish lichenologist Rolf Santesson. The original documented specimens were collected from New Zealand, at Rangituhi / Colonial Knob in Wellington, where they were growing on leaves of Polystichum hispidum.

== Description ==
Enterographa bella is characterised by a pale greyish to translucent thallus that often forms small circular spots (typically 0.4–1 mm wide), which can merge into larger colonies. The thallus, containing a Phycopeltis photobiont and devoid of a prothallus, is quite thin and can spread up to 10 mm wide. This lichen has lirelliform apothecia, which are elongated and can be straight, curved, or even serpentine (curved and twisting), usually surrounded by a pale orange-pink margin. They are typically 0.5–1 mm long. Its spores have seven transverse septa) internal partitions), and measure 20–31 by 3.5–5.5 μm. The hymenium, which measures 55–70 μm thick, has a diffusely pale brown colour towards the upper part. The major secondary metabolite (lichen product) present in Enterographa bella is psoromic acid. Chemical spot test reactions on the lichen are P+ (yellow) and C−. The asexual morph of the mycobiont fungus is unknown.

=== Similar species ===
The South American species Enterograph falcata has external and anatomical characteristics that are similar in appearance to E. bella. It can be distinguished by its 3-septate ascospores, compared to the 7-septate spores of E. bella.

== Habitat and distribution ==
Although Enterographa bella considered for several decades after its discovery to be endemic to New Zealand, its recorded occurrence in Victoria, Australia expanded its known distribution. It was also later documented from Tasmania in 2021.
