= Arthotheliopsis hymenocarpoides =

Scientific classification
- Domain: Eukaryota
- Kingdom: Fungi
- Division: Ascomycota
- Class: Lecanoromycetes
- Order: Graphidales
- Family: Gomphillaceae
- Genus: Arthotheliopsis
- Species: A. hymenocarpoides

Binomial name
- Arthotheliopsis hymenocarpoides Vain. (1896)

Species of lichen

Arthotheliopsis hymenocarpoides is a species of foliicolous lichen in the family Gomphillaceae. It is the type species of the genus Arthotheliopsis. Both the genus and species were described as new by Finnish lichenologist Edvard August Vainio in 1896. The type specimens were collected by botanist William Robert Elliott from Saint Vincent, where they were found growing on the leaves of a tree in Bonhomme forest. This collection was part of his work for the West India Natural History Exploration Committee. At the time, Vainio was an expert on tropical lichens, so the specimens were sent to him for identification.

The lichen was reported from Kinabalu National Park in Malaysia in 2008, and from Parque Estadual Mata do Pau-Ferro, Brazil, in 2016.
