= Pseudopyrenula =

Scientific classification
- Kingdom: Fungi
- Division: Ascomycota
- Class: Dothideomycetes
- Order: Trypetheliales
- Family: Trypetheliaceae
- Genus: Pseudopyrenula; Müll.Arg. (1883)

Type species
- Pseudopyrenula diluta (Fée) Müll.Arg. (1883)

Synonyms
- Plagiotrema Müll.Arg. (1885); Prototylium M.Choisy (1929)

Genus of lichen

Pseudopyrenula is a genus of lichen-forming fungi in the family Trypetheliaceae.

== Species ==
- Pseudopyrenula americana Aptroot (2016) – Guyana
- Pseudopyrenula cryptotheca Komposch, Aptroot & Hafellner (2002) – Venezuela
- Pseudopyrenula connexa Aptroot (2023) – Brazil
- Pseudopyrenula cubana (Müll.Arg.) Aptroot & Lücking (2016)
- Pseudopyrenula daironii Lücking, N.Marín & Álvaro (2023) – Colombia
- Pseudopyrenula diluta (Fée) Müll.Arg. (1883)
- Pseudopyrenula flavoreagens Aptroot & M.Cáceres (2016)
- Pseudopyrenula flavosuperans Flakus & Aptroot (2016) – Bolivia
- Pseudopyrenula gelatinosa Aptroot (2021) – Brazil
- Pseudopyrenula guianensis Aptroot (2016) – French Guiana
- Pseudopyrenula hexamera Aptroot (2016) – Venezuela
- Pseudopyrenula himalayana Ingle, Nayaka & Upreti (2024) – India
- Pseudopyrenula media Aptroot & Diederich (2017)
- Pseudopyrenula megaspora Ingle, Nayaka & Upreti (2024) – India
- Pseudopyrenula miniflavida Aptroot & A.D.Nunes (2019)
- Pseudopyrenula serusiauxii Aptroot (1998) – Papua New Guinea
- Pseudopyrenula staphyleae (Petr.) Aptroot (1998)
- Pseudopyrenula thallina Lücking & Aptroot (2016) – Costa Rica
