= Nyungwea pycnidiata =

Scientific classification
- Kingdom: Fungi
- Division: Ascomycota
- Class: Arthoniomycetes
- Order: Arthoniales
- Family: Opegraphaceae
- Genus: Nyungwea
- Species: N. pycnidiata

Binomial name
- Nyungwea pycnidiata Aptroot & M.Cáceres (2017)

Species of lichen

Nyungwea pycnidiata is a rare species of lichen in the family Opegraphaceae. Found in the North Region of Brazil, it was described as a new species in 2017. It is unique for its adaptation to living on termite nests.

== Taxonomy ==
The species was first scientifically described by lichenologists André Aptroot and Marcela Cáceres in 2015, from a specimen they collected from the Ecotel garden in Fazendinha, (municipality of Macapá, state of Amapá, Brazil). The lichen was found on a termite nest on a tree in the garden. Aptroot and Cáceres named the species pycnidiata, referring to the distinctive pycnidia (asexual reproductive structures) of the lichen. This species belongs to the genus Nyungwea, and its identification was aided by DNA sequencing, which showed a close association with the type species, Nyungwea pallida, found in Africa.

== Description ==
Nyungwea pycnidiata has a greyish-green thallus that is thin and dull, resembling clay. Unlike some other lichens, its medulla (the layer beneath the upper cortex of the thallus) does not have a distinct colour, nor does it contain calcium oxalate crystals. The lichen's hyphae (threadlike fungal cells) are hyaline, somewhat brittle, and 2–3 μm wide, giving them a rough texture due to superficial lecanoric acid crystals. The algal partner in the symbiosis is trentepohlioid, mostly solitary, and forms a dense photobiont layer.

A striking feature of this species is its abundance of pycnidia, which are whitish, papillate (having a textured, bumpy surface), and smooth. These structures measure about 0.1–0.2 mm in diameter and 0.2–0.4 mm in height. The pycnidia are covered at the base by the thallus. The species produces hyaline, simple, and ellipsoid conidia (asexual spores), measuring between 2.5 and 4.0 by 1.5–2.0 μm.

== Habitat and distribution ==
As of the time of its original publication, Nyungwea pycnidiata is only known to occur at the type locality, on termite nests on trees in a garden in Brazil. It is fairly abundant at this location.
