= Neosergipea bicolor =

Scientific classification
- Kingdom: Fungi
- Division: Ascomycota
- Class: Arthoniomycetes
- Order: Arthoniales
- Family: Roccellaceae
- Genus: Neosergipea
- Species: N. bicolor

Binomial name
- Neosergipea bicolor Aptroot & M.Cáceres (2017)

Species of lichen

Neosergipea bicolor is a rare species of corticolous (bark-dwelling), crustose lichen in the family Arthoniaceae. Found only in Brazil and described as a new species in 2017, Neosergipea bicolor is characterised (and named for) its dual-coloured appearance.

== Taxonomy ==
Neosergipea bicolor was discovered and formally described by lichenologists André Aptroot and Marcela Cáceres in 2017. The species name bicolor is inspired by its two-toned appearance. The type specimen of this species was found by the authors in the Parque Estadual Acaraí, located in São Francisco do Sul, Santa Catarina, Brazil.

The genus Neosergipea is a renaming of the original genus Sergipea due to a taxonomic clash with a pre-existing name assigned to a type of fossil dinoflagellate spore. Neosergipea bicolor is closely related to another species found in the Amazon, based on DNA sequence analysis.

== Description ==
The species Neosergipea bicolor is corticolous, meaning it grows on tree bark. Its thallus is less than 0.1 mm thick and has a whitish-grey tone. Unlike some lichen species, Neosergipea bicolor does not have a prothallus, or initial growth layer. Trentepohlioid algae are the photobiont partner in the lichen.

A defining feature of this species is its abundant pycnidia, or asexual reproductive structures. They are mainly conical in shape, whitish-grey, and have black tips. They have bright orange pruina or a waxy surface layer, at their base and partly at their sides.

The lichen does not react under ultraviolet light and no ascomata, a type of fruiting body, were observed. The orange pruina on the pycnidia glows pink under UV light and turns blood red when tested with a solution of potassium hydroxide. The species contains an anthraquinone, possibly parietin, which is a substance found in some lichens.

== Habitat and distribution ==
At the time of its initial publication, Neosergipea bicolor was exclusively known from its type locality in Brazil. It thrives on tree bark within the restinga and park ecosystems, both of which are typical Brazilian landscapes.
