= Rubrotricha =

Scientific classification
- Kingdom: Fungi
- Division: Ascomycota
- Class: Lecanoromycetes
- Order: Graphidales
- Family: Gomphillaceae
- Genus: Rubrotricha; Lücking, Sérus. & Vězda (2005)

Type species
- Rubrotricha helminthospora (R.Sant.) Lücking, Sérus. & Vězda (2005)

Genus of lichens

Rubrotricha is a genus of lichen-forming fungi in the family Gomphillaceae. It is a monospecific genus, containing the single species Rubrotricha helminthospora.
