= Enterographa lichexanthonica =

Scientific classification
- Kingdom: Fungi
- Division: Ascomycota
- Class: Arthoniomycetes
- Order: Arthoniales
- Family: Roccellaceae
- Genus: Enterographa
- Species: E. lichexanthonica

Binomial name
- Enterographa lichexanthonica M.Cáceres & Aptroot (2017)

Species of lichen

Enterographa lichexanthonica is a species of crustose and corticolous (bark-dwelling) lichen in the family Roccellaceae. Found in the Brazilian Amazon, it was formally introduced as a new species in 2017 by lichenologists Marcela Eugenia Cáceres and André Aptroot. The type specimen was collected by the authors from the Adolfo Ducke Forest Reserve (Manaus, Amazonas), along trails near a field station; here, it was found growing on tree bark in an old-growth rainforest. The lichen has a thin, dull, pale greenish thallus surrounded by a thin black prothallus. Its ascospores are hyaline, have seven septa, and measure 21–27 by 5–6 μm; they have a 1 μm-thick gelatinous sheath surrounding them. The specific epithet lichexanthonica refers to lichexanthone, a secondary chemical that occurs in the cortex of the lichen. This compound causes the lichen to fluoresce yellow when a UV light is shone upon it. Enterographa lichexanthonica is morphologically similar to E. kalbii, but this latter species has lichexanthone only on the ascomata, not on the thallus.
