= Kantvilasia =

Scientific classification
- Kingdom: Fungi
- Division: Ascomycota
- Class: Lecanoromycetes
- Order: Lecanorales
- Family: Ectolechiaceae
- Genus: Kantvilasia; P.M.McCarthy, Elix & Sérus. (2000)

Type species
- Kantvilasia hians P.M.McCarthy, Elix & Sérus. (2000)

Single-species fungal genus

Kantvilasia is a lichen genus in the family Ectolechiaceae. This is a monotypic genus, containing the single species Kantvilasia hians.

The genus and species were described in 2000 by Patrick McCarthy, John Elix and Emmanuël Sérusiaux, and the genus name honours the Australian lichenologist Gintaras Kantvilas.
