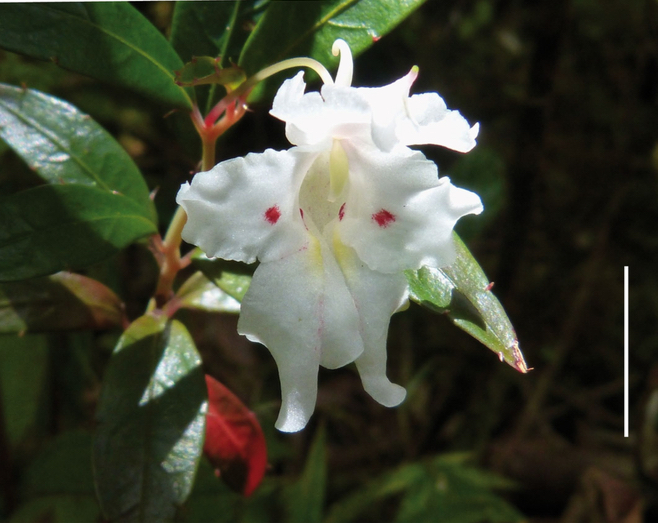
- Flower of Impatiens serusiauxii; scale bar = 1 cm

Scientific classification
- Kingdom: Plantae
- Clade: Tracheophytes
- Clade: Angiosperms
- Clade: Eudicots
- Clade: Asterids
- Order: Ericales
- Family: Balsaminaceae
- Genus: Impatiens
- Species: I. serusiauxii

Binomial name
- Impatiens serusiauxii Eb.Fisch., Raheliv. & Killmann

= Impatiens serusiauxii =

Species of flowering plant

Impatiens serusiauxii is a species of flowering plant in the family Balsaminaceae. Native to Madagascar, it was formally described as a new species in 2020 by Eberhard Fischer, Elisette Rahelivololona, and Dorothee Killmann. The specific epithet honours the Belgian lichenologist Emmanuël Sérusiaux, who accompanied Fischer on a collecting trip where the type was collected. The plant is known only from Mt. Marojejy (in Marojejy National Park), where it grows in sclerophyllous cloud forest and ericaceous shrub at elevations of 1,200 to 1,500 m (3,900 to 4,900 ft). It was previously mistaken for Impatiens manaharensis, which differs slightly in morphology such as leaf shape, and flower colour and structure.

== Description ==
Impatiens serusiauxii is a perennial herb that grows upright and lacks hair (glabrous). The plant features succulent green stems reaching heights of 29–50 cm. The leaves are arranged alternately along the stem and have short stalks (petiole) 2–3 mm long, which may bear up to one pair of nectar-producing glands (extrafloral nectaries). The leaf blades are linear-lanceolate (long and narrow, tapering to a point), measuring 2.3–5.5 cm long and 0.4–0.9 cm wide, with their widest point at the middle. The upper surface is fresh to dark green and glossy, while the undersides are pale green with a purple tinge. Each leaf has 4–5 pairs of secondary veins and 6–7 pairs of teeth along the edges, each tooth tipped with a glandular appendage.

The flowers emerge from the leaf axils either singly or in pairs, on distinctly curved stalks (pedicels) typically 3.5–4 cm long. Each flower is predominantly white, with distinctive markings: two deep red dots and two yellow dots on the fused lateral petals. The upper (dorsal) petal features a greenish ridge (crest) and a small projection (apicule).

The flower structure is complex, typical of the genus Impatiens. It includes lance-shaped lateral sepals measuring 3–4 mm long, and a boat-shaped lower sepal (navicular) 13–15 mm long with a small projection at its base. The spur, a characteristic feature of Impatiens flowers, curves upward and measures 5–6 mm in length. The fused lateral petals reach 17–20 mm long, with the upper portion being slightly notched and the lower portion deeply split into two uneven lobes – a shorter rounded inner lobe and a longer, curved outer lobe.

The male reproductive parts (anthers) are 2–4 mm long, while the female structure (ovary) measures 3–4 mm. The fruit of this species has not been documented.

== Distribution and habitat ==
Impatiens serusiauxii is endemic to Madagascar, where it is found exclusively in Mount Marojejy. The species inhabits upper montane cloud forests characterised by sclerophyllous (hard-leaved) vegetation and ericaceous shrubland. It occurs at elevations between 1,200 and 1,500 meters above sea level, with some specimens recorded as low as 1,100 meters.

== Conservation ==
The species is currently listed as Least Concern (LC) with the additional designation of Conservation Dependent (CD). While its extremely restricted range of just 9 square kilometers (measured as Area of Occupancy) would typically qualify it for Critically Endangered status, its entire population exists within the well-protected Marojejy National Park. This protected status means the species faces no immediate threats from habitat degradation or loss. However, because its conservation status relies entirely on the continued protection offered by the park, and it is known from only one location, it is potentially vulnerable to localised threats. Unlike its close relative Impatiens manaharensis, which occurs in lowland rainforest below 800 meters on the same mountain, I. serusiauxii is restricted to higher elevation habitats, potentially making it vulnerable to climate change impacts. The species has been collected multiple times at various locations within the park, suggesting a stable population within its limited range. All known specimens have been documented from the eastern summit area and along trails leading to the third camp of the reserve. I. serusiauxii is among hundreds of species that have been newly described to science from the biodiverse Marojejy region since 1988.

== See also ==
- List of Impatiens species
