= Enterographa serusiauxii =

Scientific classification
- Domain: Eukaryota
- Kingdom: Fungi
- Division: Ascomycota
- Class: Arthoniomycetes
- Order: Arthoniales
- Family: Roccellaceae
- Genus: Enterographa
- Species: E. serusiauxii

Binomial name
- Enterographa serusiauxii Lebreton & Aptroot (2020)

Species of lichen

Enterographa serusiauxii is a species of leaf-dwelling lichen in the family Roccellaceae. It is found in Guadeloupe.

== Taxonomy ==
The lichen was formally described as a new species in 2020 by Elise Lebreton and André Aptroot. The type specimen was collected in the Littoral de Robin municipality of Trois Rivières, Guadeloupe. Here it was found growing on living leaves of Garcinia humilis in a coastal forest. The species had been found decades ago by Father Casimir Le Gallo, who collected many leaf-dwelling lichens that he sent to the National Museum of Natural History, but it was not published and not documented again until its recollection in 2019. The specific epithet honours Belgian lichenologist Emmanuël Sérusiaux, who the authors noted for his "profound interest in foliicolous lichens and in the lichen flora of Guadeloupe".

== Description ==
The lichen has a crustose, pale-cream to off-white thallus that is verrucose (covered with tiny warts). The thallus is up to 0.9 centimetres (0.35 in) in diameter and about 0.1 mm thick. The photobiont partner is a green alga of genus Trentepohlia. The apothecia of the lichen are oval to irregularly slit-shaped, and immersed in the thallus. The ascospores number eight per ascus, and are hyaline, 7 to 9-septate, and typically measure 27–29 by 2.5–3.5 μm. The medulla of Enterographa serusiauxii contains gyrophoric acid, resulting in a positive C+ red chemical spot test.

== Habitat and distribution ==
The lichen is known only from Guadeloupe, where it grows on the living leaves of both Garcinia humilis and Calophyllum calaba near the coast.
