= Bapalmuia serusiauxiana =

Scientific classification
- Kingdom: Fungi
- Division: Ascomycota
- Class: Lecanoromycetes
- Order: Lecanorales
- Family: Ectolechiaceae
- Genus: Bapalmuia
- Species: B. serusiauxiana

Binomial name
- Bapalmuia serusiauxiana Van den Broeck, Lücking & Ertz (2014)

Species of lichen-forming fungus

Bapalmuia serusiauxiana is a species of foliicolous lichen in the family Ectolechiaceae. Found in the Democratic Republic of the Congo, it was described as a new species in 2014 by Dries Van den Broeck, Robert Lücking, and Damien Ertz. The type specimen was collected in Mbangi, about 20 km (12 miles) upstream of Lisala, on the left bank of the Congo River. There, it was found growing on leaves in an old secondary forest. The specific epithet honours the Belgian lichenologist Emmanuël Sérusiaux, "an outstanding figure in foliicolous lichen research, especially in tropical Africa".
