= Pseudopyrenula serusiauxii =

Scientific classification
- Kingdom: Fungi
- Division: Ascomycota
- Class: Dothideomycetes
- Order: Trypetheliales
- Family: Trypetheliaceae
- Genus: Pseudopyrenula
- Species: P. serusiauxii

Binomial name
- Pseudopyrenula serusiauxii Aptroot (1998)

Species of lichen

Pseudopyrenula serusiauxii is a species of lichen-forming fungus in the family Trypetheliaceae. It is found in Papua New Guinea. The lichen appears as a greenish discolouration on the trunks of Macaranga trees.

== Taxonomy ==
The lichen was formally described as a new species in 1998 by Dutch lichenologist André Aptroot. The specific epithet honours Belgian lichenologist Emmanuël Sérusiaux, a colleague of the author who accompanied him on some collecting expeditions in the country. The type was collected in the Balek Wildlife Sanctuary in Madang Province, where it was found growing on Macaranga tree trunk in the relics of a secondary forest.

== Description ==
The lichen has a thallus that is immersed in the bark of its host, lacks a cortex, and appears as a greenish discoloration that is up to 5 cm (2 in) wide. The photobiont partner – a green alga of the genus Trentepohlia – is sparse in the thallus. The ascomata are more or less spherical, and small (measuring 0.2–0.4 mm in diameter) with black walls. They have flat ostioles, rather than conical ostioles that are typical of the genus Pseudopyrenula. The ascospores, which number 8 per ascus, are spindle-shaped (fusiform), have 3 septa, and feature angular, diamond-shaped lumina (interior spaces). The spores measure 30–39 by 6–8 μm. All lichen spot tests are negative, and no lichen substances were detected using thin-layer chromatography.
