= Enterographa aldabrensis =

Scientific classification
- Kingdom: Fungi
- Division: Ascomycota
- Class: Arthoniomycetes
- Order: Arthoniales
- Family: Roccellaceae
- Genus: Enterographa
- Species: E. aldabrensis

Binomial name
- Enterographa aldabrensis Sparrius (2009)

Species of lichen

Enterographa aldabrensis is a species of corticolous (bark-dwelling), crustose lichen in the family Roccellaceae. It is only known to occur in Aldabra in the Seychelles.

== Taxonomy ==
Enterographa aldabrensis was formally described as a new species by the Dutch lichenologist Laurens Benjamin Sparrius. The species is characterised by its ascospores that contain three septa and absence of norstictic acid, distinguishing it from closely related species such as Enterographa subserialis and E. elixii.

== Description ==
The lichen has a thallus up to 5 cm (2 in) in diameter, smooth to areolate, white to cream-coloured, and water-repellent, measuring 50–100 μm thick. It contains Trentepohlia ( a genus of green algae) as its photobiont partner. The prothallus is very thin, grey or absent. The upper algae-free medulla is about 10 μm thick, consisting of densely interwoven hyphae. The medulla is cream-coloured with abundant oxalate crystals measuring 10–20 μm in diameter.

Ascomata are punctiform or slightly comma-shaped, perithecioid, measuring 0.05 by 0.05–0.10 mm, with a disc that is dark brown to black and epruinose. The thalline margin is approximately 0.1 mm wide and forms linear, frequently branched pseudostromata, which may become mixed with neighbouring pseudostromata. The excipulum is 5–10 μm wide, hyaline (translucent) in section but often brown near the epithecium. The hypothecium is hyaline, 10–30 μm tall, and the hymenium is hyaline, 80–100 μm tall.

The epithecium is 10–12 μm tall, orange-brown, with crystals of about 0.5 μm in diameter, and reacts K+ (green). Asci are cylindrical, 60–80 by 12–20 μm, and have eight spores. Ascospores are ellipsoid, somewhat constricted around the middle, measuring 13–18 by 4.0–5.5 μm, 3-septate, with a perispore less than 2.0 μm thick. Conidiomata appear as dark brown dots along the thallus margin, and conidia are rod-shaped, measuring 0.7 by 2.0–2.5 μm.

== Chemistry ==
The thallus of Enterographa aldabrensis reacts C−, K+ (yellowish), P+ (yellow), UV+ (cream-coloured) to standard chemical spot tests. Thin-layer chromatography reveals the presence of psoromic acid. The epithecium and excipulum show an amyloid reaction, I+ and KI+ (dark blue), while the hymenium, asci, and hypothecium react I+ (red) and KI+ (dark blue).

== Habitat and distribution ==
This species is known only from the type locality in Aldabra, Seychelles. It grows on the bark of coastal trees and shrubs.

== Similar species ==
Enterographa aldabrensis is recognised by its thin, pale thallus with black punctiform, immersed ascomata arranged in lines. It is morphologically and chemically similar to E. subserialis but differs in having 3-septate ascospores and a K+ (green) epithecium. It lacks trace amounts of norstictic acid found in the hypothecium of similar species. This species is differentiated from E. compunctula, which also has 3-septate ascospores, by its chemical composition and the shape of its pseudostromata.
