= Pseudopyrenula americana =

Scientific classification
- Kingdom: Fungi
- Division: Ascomycota
- Class: Dothideomycetes
- Order: Trypetheliales
- Family: Trypetheliaceae
- Genus: Pseudopyrenula
- Species: P. americana

Binomial name
- Pseudopyrenula americana Aptroot (2016)

Species of lichen

Pseudopyrenula americana is a species of a bark-dwelling crustose lichen in the family Trypetheliaceae. It is known only from Guyana, where it grows on smooth bark in lowland to montane rainforest; collections include material from the north slope of Mount Roraima and from Mount Latipu.

== Taxonomy ==
The species belongs to the Pseudopyrenula diluta group (medium-spored, 3-septate Pseudopyrenula). It is distinguished within that assemblage by a combination of negative characters: the absence of lichexanthone and the lack of inspersion (no oil droplets) in the hymenial matrix. The type specimen was collected in February 1985 on the north slope of Mount Roraima (Upper Mazaruni District, Guyana).

== Description ==
The thallus is thin, whitish and ecorticate – that is, it lacks a differentiated outer cortex. Sexual fruiting bodies (ascomata) occur singly or, less often, with a few laterally fused; they are hemispherical, black, and 0.3–0.5 mm in diameter. Each has a minute pore at the top (an apical ostiole), which can appear whitish to black. Internally, the hamathecium (the gelatinous tissue between the spore sacs) is clear and colourless, without inspersion. The asci contain eight colourless ascospores that do not react with iodine (IKI−). Ascospores are 3-septate, 26–32 × 7–10 μm, smooth-walled, and show diamond-shaped internal cavities (lumina) produced by thickening of the inner spore wall.

In terms of chemistry, the thallus of P. americana is UV-negative, and thin-layer chromatography detected no secondary metabolites; lichexanthone is absent.

== Habitat and distribution ==
Pseudopyrenula americana grows on smooth bark of trees in rainforest. It is confirmed only from Guyana, with collections from Mount Roraima (about 700 m elevation) and Mount Latipu (about 1,000 m).
