= Arthotheliopsis serusiauxii =

Scientific classification
- Domain: Eukaryota
- Kingdom: Fungi
- Division: Ascomycota
- Class: Lecanoromycetes
- Order: Graphidales
- Family: Gomphillaceae
- Genus: Arthotheliopsis
- Species: A. serusiauxii

Binomial name
- Arthotheliopsis serusiauxii (Lücking) Lücking, Sérus. & Vězda (2005)

Synonyms
- Echinoplaca serusiauxii Lücking (1997)

Species of lichen

Arthotheliopsis serusiauxii is a species of leaf-dwelling lichen in the family Gomphillaceae. It was first formally described as a new species in 1997 by Robert Lücking, as a member of genus Echinoplaca. The type specimen was collected in Costa Rica, growing on the leaves of a dicotyledon. The specific epithet honours Belgian lichenologist Emmanuël Sérusiaux. In 2005, Lücking, Sérusiaux, and Antonín Vězda transferred it to genus Arthotheliopsis after a molecular analysis of the Gomphillaceae helped to clarify the phylogenetic relationships in the family.
