= Brasilicia =

Scientific classification
- Kingdom: Fungi
- Division: Ascomycota
- Class: Lecanoromycetes
- Order: Lecanorales
- Family: Ectolechiaceae
- Genus: Brasilicia; Lücking, Kalb & Sérus. (2008)

Type species
- Brasilicia brasiliensis (Müll.Arg.) Lücking, Kalb & Sérus. (2008)

Species
- B. brasiliensis B. dimerelloides B. foliicola B. ituriensis B. olivaceorufa B. subsimilis

Genus of lichen-forming fungi

Brasilicia is a genus of leaf-dwelling lichens in the family Ectolechiaceae. It has 6 species. The genus was circumscribed in 2008 by lichenologists Robert Lücking, Klaus Kalb, and Emmanuël Sérusiaux, with B. brasiliensis assigned as the type species. The genus was originally circumscribed as monotypic; Edit Farkas transferred five species to Brasilicia from Bacidia in 2015.

== Species ==
- Brasilicia brasiliensis (Müll.Arg.) Lücking, Kalb & Sérus. (2008)
- Brasilicia dimerelloides (Vězda) Farkas (2015)
- Brasilicia foliicola (Vězda) Farkas (2015)
- Brasilicia ituriensis (Vězda) Farkas (2015)
- Brasilicia olivaceorufa (Vain.) Farkas (2015)
- Brasilicia subsimilis (Vězda) Farkas (2015)
