= Pseudopyrenula flavosuperans =

Scientific classification
- Kingdom: Fungi
- Division: Ascomycota
- Class: Dothideomycetes
- Order: Trypetheliales
- Family: Trypetheliaceae
- Genus: Pseudopyrenula
- Species: P. flavosuperans

Binomial name
- Pseudopyrenula flavosuperans Flakus & Aptroot (2016)
- Holotype: near Reyes, Prov. José Ballivián, Bolivia

Species of lichen

Pseudopyrenula flavosuperans is a species of corticolous (bark-dwelling) crustose lichen in the family Trypetheliaceae. This tropical lichen forms smooth, white crusty patches on tree bark and is recognized by its distinctive black, hemispherical fruiting bodies that sit raised above the surface like small warts. It can be distinguished from similar species by the yellow oil droplets inside its fruiting bodies. The species was described as new to science in 2016 by Adam Flakus and André Aptroot from material collected in Bolivia.

== Taxonomy ==
The species was described from a type specimen collected in 2004 near Reyes village in the Moxos savannah of Beni Department, Bolivia. The epithet flavosuperans refers to the yellow-inspersed hamathecium and its similarity to Pseudopyrenula superans. While both species share a white, ecorticate thallus and similarly sized ascospores, P. flavosuperans is set apart by the presence of yellow oil globules in the hamathecium, whereas P. superans has colourless (hyaline) globules.

== Description ==
The thallus of P. flavosuperans is smooth, continuous, white, and ecorticate (lacking a differentiated outer cortex). It may cover areas up to 6 cm in diameter, is about 0.2 mm thick, and is bordered by a black prothallus. It does not cause swellings in the host bark.

The fruiting bodies (ascomata) are solitary, superficial, more or less spherical (subglobose, and distinctly raised above the thallus as hemispherical black warts 0.6–0.8 mm in diameter, sometimes partly immersed at the base. Their walls are fully carbonized, uniform (not separated into different layers), and up to 100 μm thick. Each ascoma has a convex, apical pore (ostiole) that is black. Internally, the hamathecium is filled with yellow oil droplets (an inspersion). The asci contain eight spores. The ascospores are colorless (hyaline), three-septate, narrowly ellipsoid to spindle-shaped (fusiform), with rounded ends, and measure 26–36 × 7–10 μm. They are smooth, lack a gelatinous sheath, and display the diamond-shaped lumina typical of the genus. Asexual structures (pycnidia) have not been observed.

The thallus surface fluoresces yellow under ultraviolet light (UV+), indicating the presence of lichexanthone, confirmed by thin-layer chromatography. The thallus medulla is negative with potassium hydroxide solution (K−), and the ascomata surface is UV−.

== Habitat and distribution ==
Pseudopyrenula flavosuperans grows on smooth bark of trees in lowland habitats, including Moxos savannah and Amazon forest. It is known to occur only in Bolivia, with collections made in Beni and Santa Cruz Departments.
