= Sporopodiopsis =

Scientific classification
- Kingdom: Fungi
- Division: Ascomycota
- Class: Lecanoromycetes
- Order: Lecanorales
- Family: Ectolechiaceae
- Genus: Sporopodiopsis; Sérus. (1997)

Type species
- Sporopodiopsis sipmanii Sérus. (1997)

Species
- Sporopodiopsis mortimeriana Sporopodiopsis sipmanii

Genus of lichen-forming fungi

Sporopodiopsis is a genus of two species of lichenized fungi in the family Ectolechiaceae. The genus was circumscribed by the Belgian lichenologist Emmanuël Sérusiaux in 1997.
