= Neosergipea hyphosa =

Scientific classification
- Domain: Eukaryota
- Kingdom: Fungi
- Division: Ascomycota
- Class: Arthoniomycetes
- Order: Arthoniales
- Family: Roccellaceae
- Genus: Neosergipea
- Species: N. hyphosa

Binomial name
- Neosergipea hyphosa Aptroot & M.Cáceres (2017)

Species of lichen

Neosergipea hyphosa is a species of corticolous (bark-dwelling) lichen in the family Roccellaceae. This lichen species is uniquely characterised by its olive-green thallus—a type of vegetative tissue—and spherical ascomata, or fungal reproductive structures. It is most commonly found on tree bark in Brazil. The name hyphosa alludes to the distinct hyphose surface of the thallus.

== Taxonomy ==
Neosergipea hyphosa was first identified and described by lichenologists André Aptroot and Marcela Cáceres in 2017. The type specimen was collected by the authors in August 2015 at the Ecotel garden in Fazendinha (Macapá, Amapá, Brazil), where it was growing on tree bark. The species name hyphosa refers to the thallus surface, which is described as "hyphose", a term denoting a specific type of surface texture.

DNA sequencing of Neosergipea hyphosa has revealed a close relationship with the previously monotypic genus Neosergipea, which was originally circumscribed with the name Sergipea. The name was updated due to the pre-existence of a fossil dinoflagellate spore genus named Sergipea. The renaming of the genus to Neosergipea was carried out by Robert Lücking and colleagues in 2016.

== Description ==
Neosergipea hyphosa features an olive-green thallus that is approximately 0.1 mm thick and has a dull, non-corticate appearance. The central part of the thallus is verrucose—covered in small, wart-like protrusions—and is surrounded by a pinkish to dark violet-brown hyphal prothallus that is about 3 mm wide. This prothallus has protruding rhizohyphae, which are strands of hyphae that help the lichen to attach to surfaces.

The thallus' medulla, or inner tissue, is whitish and contrasts sharply with the surface colour. It is devoid of calcium oxalate crystals, a feature common in many lichen species. The algae cells found in the thallus are of the trentepohlioid type, with cells structured in branched filaments.

The ascomata of Neosergipea hyphosa are round and about 0.1 mm in diameter. They typically occur in groups of 5–15 and have clear walls. Notably, they do not contain ascospores. Pycnidia, or asexual reproductive structures, have not been observed in this species.

Neosergipea hyphosa does not react to any of the standard chemical spot tests used in lichen identification. In addition, thin-layer chromatography did not detect any specific substances.

== Similar species ==
There are several other species within the genus Neosergipea, including one that resides in the coastal forests (restinga) of Santa Catarina. However, Neosergipea hyphosa is distinguished from its congeners due to its distinct hyphal morphology and the absence of anthraquinones, organic compounds that impart an orange or yellow colour to other Neosergipea species.

== Habitat and distribution ==
Neosergipea hyphosa is a corticolous species, meaning it grows on tree bark. It is known to inhabit garden environments and at the time of its publication had been only documented in Brazil.
