= Pseudopyrenula thallina =

Scientific classification
- Kingdom: Fungi
- Division: Ascomycota
- Class: Dothideomycetes
- Order: Trypetheliales
- Family: Trypetheliaceae
- Genus: Pseudopyrenula
- Species: P. thallina

Binomial name
- Pseudopyrenula thallina Lücking & Aptroot (2016)

Species of lichen

Pseudopyrenula thallina is a species of bark-dwelling, crustose lichen in the family Trypetheliaceae. It is unusual within its genus because it develops a distinct, corticate thallus. The species is known to occur only in Costa Rica.

== Taxonomy ==
The species was described from a type specimen collected in 1930 by Carroll W. Dodge and E. Thomas at Hacienda Granadilla, Guanacaste Province, Costa Rica, at 500–600 m (1,600–2,000 ft) elevation. It had been recognised earlier in the literature but was not formally named until its description by Robert Lücking and André Aptroot in 2016. Pseudopyrenula thallina is the only species in the genus Pseudopyrenula with a well-developed thallus, which sets it apart from close relatives such as P. subnudata.

== Description ==
The thallus of P. thallina is yellow-green, corticate (with a distinct protective outer layer, or cortex), somewhat shiny, and lacks both pseudocyphellae (tiny pores) and a prothallus (an outer growth margin). The fruiting bodies (ascomata) are produced singly, each with a small apical pore (ostiole). Inside, the hamathecium is colourless (hyaline) but contains scattered oil droplets (inspersion). The ascospores are colourless, divided by three cross-walls (3-septate), and measure 21–25 × 6–9 μm.

The thallus does not fluoresce under ultraviolet light (UV−), and thin-layer chromatography detected no secondary metabolites.

== Habitat and distribution ==
Pseudopyrenula thallina grows on the smooth bark of trees in rainforest. It is known only from Costa Rica, with collections made at both Hacienda Granadilla (the type locality) and Guayabillos in San José Province.
