= Enterographa incognita =

Scientific classification
- Kingdom: Fungi
- Division: Ascomycota
- Class: Arthoniomycetes
- Order: Arthoniales
- Family: Roccellaceae
- Genus: Enterographa
- Species: E. incognita

Binomial name
- Enterographa incognita Ertz & Tehler (2014)

Species of lichen

Enterographa incognita is a little-known species of crustose lichen in the family Roccellaceae. Found in Southeast Thailand, it is characterised by its sorediate features and its distinct ascomata and ascospores. This lichen, only known to occur in its type locality, thrives on large trunks in a mangrove environment.

== Taxonomy ==
Enterographa incognita was first described scientifically in 2014 by lichenologists Damien Ertz and Anders Tehler. The type specimen was discovered by the first author in Trat province, Thailand, in Ban Pak Khlong Nam Chiew mangrove on a large trunk.

== Description ==
Enterographa incognita has a crustose thallus that is completely sorediate and water-repellent. The soralia are 100–300 μm in diameter and densely cover the substrate, often merging. The inner part of the soralia is white, containing abundant hyaline crystals that do not dissolve in a potassium hydroxide solution. The photobiont associated with this species is trentepohlioid.

The ascomata are punctiform and immersed in white pseudostromata. The ascospores usually have between 7 and 9 septa(sometimes as many as 12), and typical dimensions of 43.0–55.5 by 4–5 μm. These features help distinguish Enterographa incognita from other similar species. Conidiomata, however, have not been observed in this species.

== Similar species ==
Enterographa incognita differs from other sorediate Enterographa species, such as Enterographa sorediata and E. zephyri, due to its larger and more septate ascospores, as well as its unique chemistry. It also differs from non-sorediate species like E. diederichiana and E. tropica in terms of thallus structure and ascospore features. Further research may help to better understand the relationships between these species and their ecological roles within their respective habitats.

== Habitat and distribution ==
Enterographa incognita is only known to inhabit the mangrove environment of its type locality in Southeast Thailand. It is found on large trunks, at an altitude of 1 metre above sea level. Its distribution and habitat preferences may be influenced by the presence of suitable substrates and specific environmental conditions.
