= Emmanuël Sérusiaux =

Belgian lichenologist

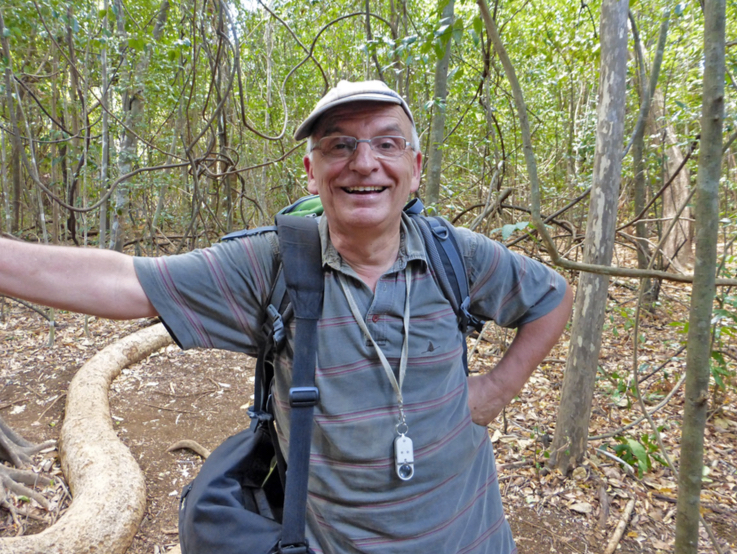
- In Madagascar, 2014
- Born: 3 October 1953 (age 72); Dinant, Belgium
- Education: University of Liège
- Scientific career
- Fields: Lichenology
- Workplaces: National Fund for Scientific Research; University of Liège
- Author abbrev. (botany): Sérus.

Emmanuël Sérusiaux (born 3 October 1953) is a Belgian lichenologist. His career, spanning more than four decades, has combined both lichenology research and political aspects of nature conservation. He spent several periods working as a researcher at the National Fund for Scientific Research and the University of Liège, the latter in which he accepted a faculty position as professor and head of the Plant Taxonomy and Conservation Biology unit. Sérusiaux also served for three non-consecutive appointments as Deputy Chief of Staff in the Government of Wallonia. He retired from both his academic and political positions in 2019.

Sérusiaux published several phylogenies of lichen genera and described more than 200 new species, 20 genera, and the family Lepidostromataceae. This information was conveyed through his 145 authored or co-authored scientific publications from the period 1976 to 2020. He has had a strong research interest in the systematics of lichens that grow on leaves, the lichen flora of tropical Africa, the genus Parmelia (in the broad sense), and the order Peltigerales. Three lichen genera, several species of lichens and lichenicolous fungi, and a plant have been named in honour of Sérusiaux.

== Education ==
Emmanuël Sérusiaux was born in Dinant, Belgium, on 3 October 1953. He obtained a master's degree in botany at the University of Liège in 1975 before spending a year at Harvard University on a fellowship from Rotary International. He earned a doctorate in botanical sciences, also from the University of Liège, in 1982 while working under the supervision of Professor Jacques Lambinon.

== Career ==
Sérusiaux's career has merged both lichenology research and the political aspects of nature conservation. His research career began as an associate at the National Fund for Scientific Research (NFSR) (1982–1984), then at the University of Liège (1984–1986). After this he took a position as Deputy Chief of Staff to Daniel Ducarme, the Minister of Agriculture and Environment of Wallonia (1986–88). He was a research fellow at NFSR from 1989 to 1999, and a professor at the University of Liège in the Department of Biology, Ecology and Evolution from 2004 to 2019. At the university, he was head of the Plant Taxonomy and Conservation Biology unit, which was later renamed Evolution and Conservation Biology. Interspersed, he had a second term as Chief of Staff (1999–2004) to Michel Foret, Minister of Territory Development, Urbanism and Environment of Wallonia, and third (2017–2019) term as Chief of Staff to Willy Borsus, the Minister-President of Wallonia. Sérusiaux retired from his academic and political positions in 2019.

As a professor, Sérusiaux taught courses about botany, plant systematics, lichenology, biogeography, biodiversity, evolutionary biology, and conservation biology. To help his students understand biodiversity in its natural habitats, he organised field courses for many of his classes, including to Tenerife (Canary Islands), Romania, Rwanda, and various locations in France (Vosges, Alsace, and Brittany). Sérusiaux has mentored several master's and doctorate post-graduate students. Worried that students in the master's degree program in biological sciences would not gain the expertise needed for successful employment in field biologist positions, in 2014 he founded a new master's degree program in conservation biology and biodiversity management.

During his professorship at the University of Liège, Sérusiaux established the aCREA (Conseils et recherchesen écologie appliquée), a research and consulting firm with ties to the university. Its work and research focuses on taking ecology into account in the fields of safeguarding and managing natural resources, biodiversity, and landscapes. Other administrative positions that Sérusiaux held relating to environmental organisations include: president of Aquapole, a research centre within the Liège University campus dedicated to water science, from 2002 to 2019; member of the Research Council of the University of Liège from 2005 to 2009; and member of the Administrative Board of LEPUR (Centre de recherche sur la ville, le territoireet le milieu rural) from 2004 to 2019. He has also served administratively for Natagora, a non-governmental organisation dedicated to biodiversity and conservation in Wallonia, from 2012 to 2017, and as the president of the Société wallonne des eaux from 2001 to 2007.

== Research ==
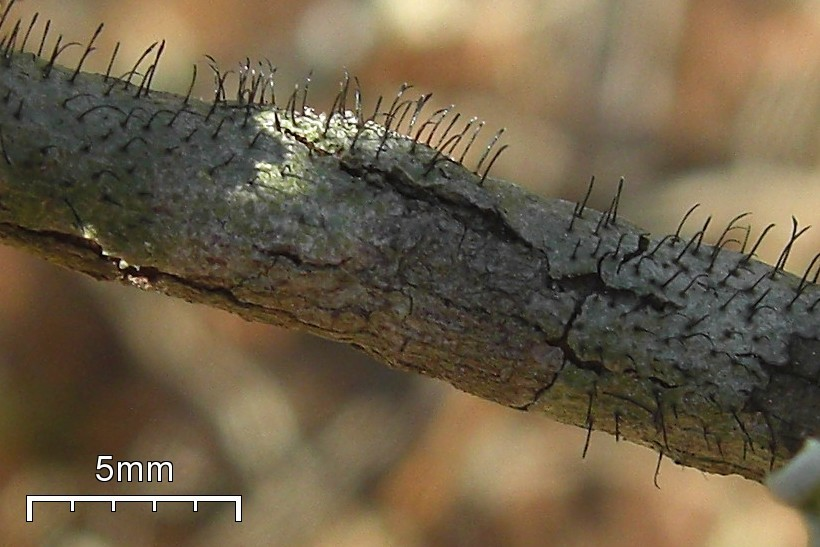
Gyalideopsis buckii was described as a new species by Sérusiaux and colleagues in 2005.

Sérusiaux helped to develop a molecular biology facility at the University of Liège where DNA was extracted and prepared from thousands of lichen specimens. This has enabled him and his colleagues to publish phylogenies for several lichen genera, including Nephroma, Peltigera, Niebla, Sticta, and the family Pannariaceae. Sérusiaux has a broad range of interests in lichenology, as is shown by the variety of different taxa covered in his publications. In addition to circumscribing a new family (Lepidostromataceae) and twenty new genera (Aplanocalenia, Bapalmuia, Brasilicia, Bryogomphus, Eugeniella, Fellhaneropsis, Ferraroa, Gallaicolichen, Hippocrepidea, Isalonactis, Jamesiella, Kantvilasia, Lambinonia, Lilliputeana, Lithogyalideopsis, Nyungwea, Phyllocratera, Rubrotricha, Savoronala, Sporopodiopsis), he has also formally described 206 new species. He has had a strong interest in the systematics of foliicolous lichens, the lichen flora of tropical Africa (in particular, the countries Burundi, Réunion, Rwanda, Zaire, and Zimbabwe), the genus Parmelia (in the broad sense), and the lichen order Peltigerales.

Throughout his career, Sérusiaux has organized many field trips, mostly to tropical locations, to study the local lichen flora. These have been quite productive and have help further the knowledge of lichenology in these areas. For example, an expedition to Papua New Guinea in 1992 with friends and colleagues resulted in the collection of almost 10,000 specimens, and the publication of 6 new genera and 89 new species.

The reproductive structures of foliicolous lichens were a particular research focus for Sérusiaux in the 1980s. He investigated campylidia, unusual helmet-shaped structures containing conidia. He defined the term goniocystangium—a concave, hollow, cup-like structure producing goniocysts that are found in the genera Catillaria and Opegrapha. His 2009 work "Liste rouge des macrolichens dans la Communauté Européenne" ("Red list of macrolichens in the European Community") was the first Regional Red List of lichens for the European Community (later the European Union), which was prepared as part of the Habitats Directive (Council Directive 92/43/EEC on the Conservation of natural habitats and of wild fauna and flora).

== Recognition ==
After his retirement, a Festschrift in the scientific journal Plant and Fungal Systematics (volume 65, issue 1, 2020) was dedicated to Sérusiaux. In this volume of 16 publications, several new taxa were named after him.

=== Eponymy ===
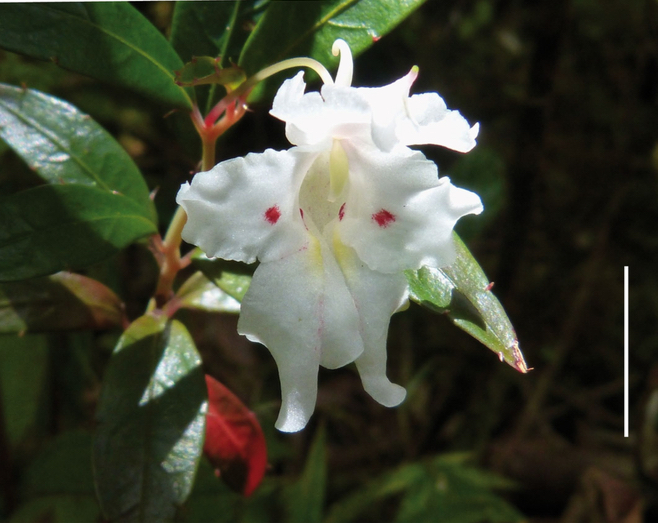
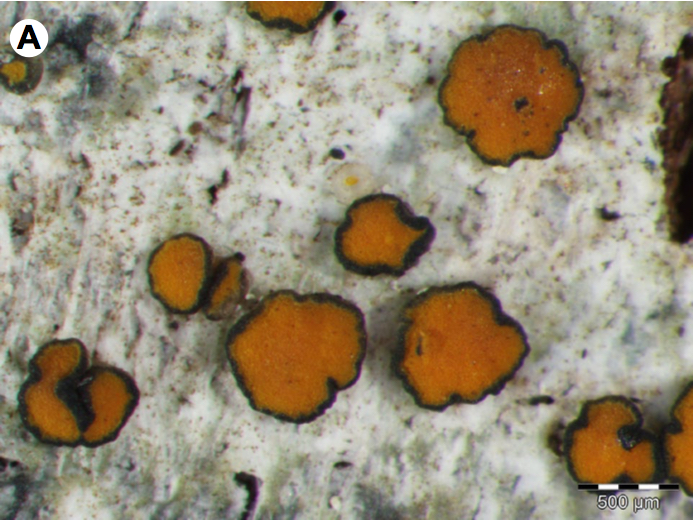
Impatiens serusiauxii, a flowering plant from Madagascar, and Ikaeria serusiauxii, a crustose lichen from Macaronesia and mainland Portugal, are two of several species that were named in honour of Sérusiaux in 2020.

Sérusiaux has had three lichen genera and several species of lichens and lichenicolous fungi named in his honour: Serusiauxiella S.H.Jiang, Lücking & J.C.Wei (2020); Emmanuelia Ant.Simon, Lücking & Goffinet (2020) and Serusiauxia Ertz & Diederich (2020); Echinoplaca serusiauxii Lücking (1997); Badimiella serusiauxii Malcolm & Vězda (1994); Bapalmuia serusiauxiana Van den Broeck, Lücking & Ertz (2014); Opegrapha serusiauxii Lücking (2008); Plectocarpon serusiauxii Ertz & Diederich (2005); Polycoccum serusiauxii Matzer (1996); Pseudopyrenula serusiauxii Aptroot (1998); Sclerococcum serusiauxii Boqueras & Diederich (1993); Taeniolella serusiauxii Diederich (1992); Xanthoparmelia serusiauxii Hale (1986); Enterographa serusiauxii Lebreton & Aptroot (2020); Fulvophyton serusiauxii Sparrius & Tehler (2020); Ikaeria serusiauxii Sipman (2020); Impatiens serusiauxii Eb.Fisch., Raheliv. & Killmann (2020); Peltigera serusiauxii Magain, Miadl., Goffinet & Ant.Simon (2020); and Sticta emmanueliana Moncada, Lücking & Lumbsch (2020).

== Selected publications ==
A comprehensive list of Sérusiaux's publication is given in Magain and colleagues' 2020 tribute. His first scientific publication, in 1975, was about the water birds of the upper Meuse, a river in Belgium; this was followed a year later by a study of the foliicolous lichen specimens held at the Farlow Herbarium of Cryptogamic Botany. As of 2020, Sérusiaux had authored or co-authored 145 publications relating to lichenology. Some representative publications include:

- Sérusiaux, E. (1986). "The nature and origin of campylidia in lichenized fungi". The Lichenologist. 18 (1): 1–35. doi:10.1017/S0024282986000038. hdl:2268/174865.
- Sérusiaux, E. (1987). "Goniocysts, goniocystangia and Opegrapha lambinonii and related species". The Lichenologist. 17 (1): 1–25. doi:10.1017/S0024282985000032. hdl:2268/174642.
- Sérusiaux, Emmanuël (1996). "Foliicolous lichens from Madeira, with the description of a new genus and two new species and a world-wide key of foliicolous Fellhanera". The Lichenologist. 28 (3): 197–227. doi:10.1006/lich.1996.0019. hdl:2268/174989.
- Aptroot, André; Diederich, Paul; Sérusiaux, Emmanuël; Sipman, Harrie J.M. (1997). Lichens and Lichenicolous Fungi from New Guinea. Bibliotheca Lichenologica. Vol. 64. J. Cramer. pp. 1–220. ISBN 978-3-443-58043-8.
- Sérusiaux, Emmanuël; Diederich, Paul; Lambinon, Jacques (2004). Les Macrolichens de Belgique, du Luxembourg et du Nord de la France: Clés de Détermination [The Macro Lichens of Belgium, Luxembourg and the North of France: Identification Keys]. Ferrantia – Travaux Scientifiques du MNHN. Vol. 40. Luxembourg: Musée National d'Histoire Naturelle. pp. 1–192.
- Ferraro, Lidia Itati; Lücking, Robert; Sérusiaux, Emmanuël (2001). "A world monograph of the lichen genus Gyalectidium (Gomphillaceae)". Botanical Journal of the Linnean Society. 137 (3): 311–345. doi:10.1006/bojl.2001.0484. hdl:11336/31010.
- Roux, Claude (Louis); Sérusiaux, Emmanuël (2004). Le genre Strigula (lichens) en Europe et en Macaronésie. Bibliotheca Lichenologica. Vol. 90. J. Cramer. pp. 1–96. ISBN 978-3-443-58069-8.

== See also ==
- Category:Taxa named by Emmanuël Sérusiaux

== Citations ==
=== Cited literature ===
- Magain, Nicolas; Ertz, Damien; Goffinet, Bernard; Diederich, Paul (2020). "Forty-five years of lichenology: a tribute to Emmanuël Sérusiaux". Plant and Fungal Systematics. 65 (1): 2–12. doi:10.35535/pfsyst-2020-0002.
