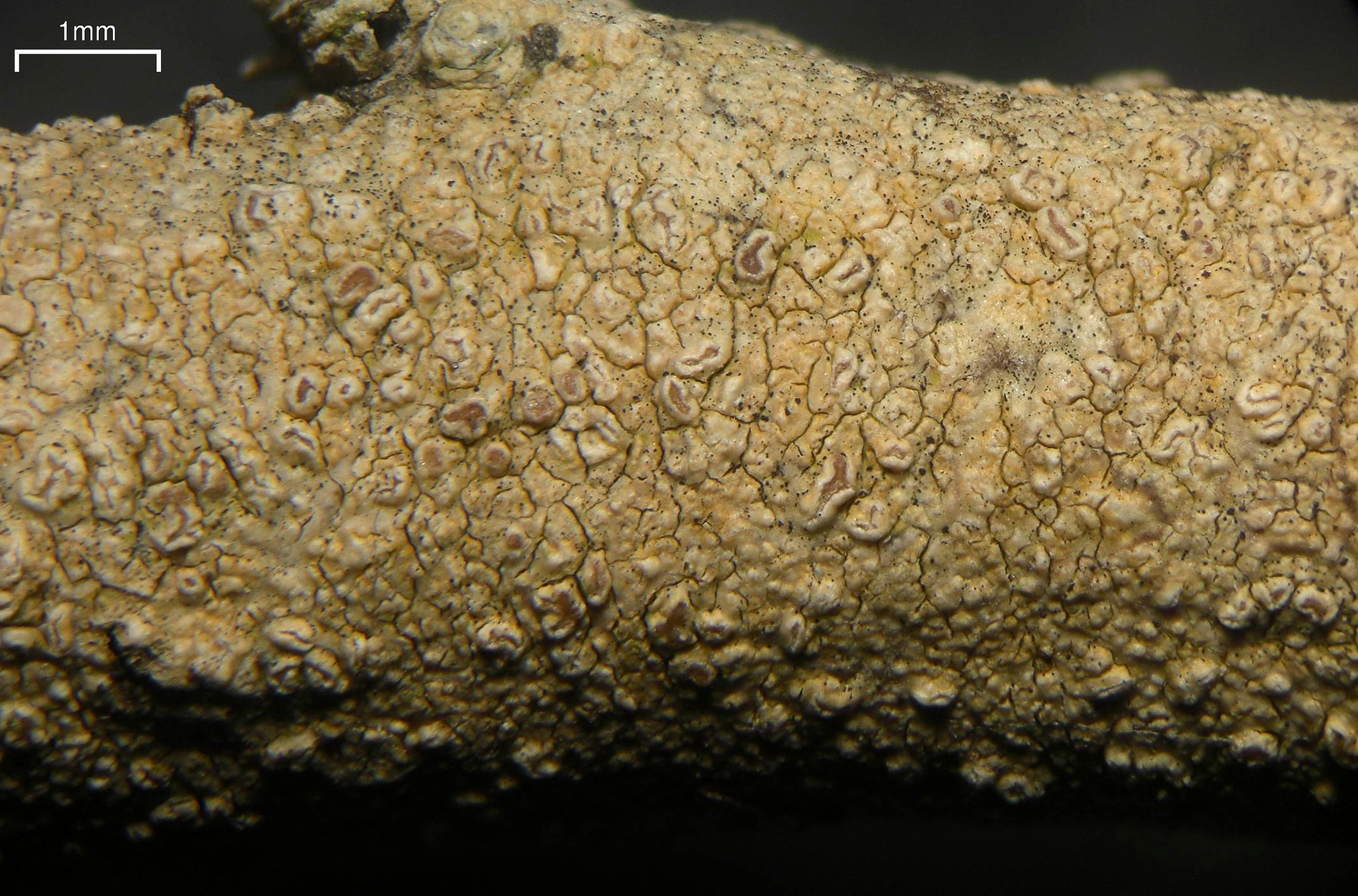
- Enterographa anguinella growing on twig of Quercus virginiana

Scientific classification
- Kingdom: Fungi
- Division: Ascomycota
- Class: Arthoniomycetes
- Order: Arthoniales
- Family: Roccellaceae
- Genus: Enterographa; Fée (1825)

Type species
- Enterographa crassa (DC.) Fée (1825)

Synonyms
- Arthonaria Fr. (1825); Stigmatidium G.Mey. (1825); Platygramma Leight. (1854); Chiodectonomyces Cif. & Tomas. (1953)

= Enterographa =

Genus of lichen-forming fungi

Enterographa is a genus of lichens in the family Roccellaceae. These lichens grow as thin, paint-like crusts on tree bark that range in colour from off-white and pale grey to dark olive-green or brown, sometimes breaking into networks of tiny, flat blocks. They reproduce through tiny slits or dots embedded in the crust that contain spindle-shaped spores divided into multiple cells, distinguishing them from other similar-looking bark lichens.

== Description ==
Enterographa species grow as thin, paint-like crusts that either lie smoothly on the bark or break into a network of tiny, flat blocks (areoles). Colours range from off-white and pale grey to dark olive-green or brown, and neighbouring colonies often form mosaic patterns separated by a narrow, grey-to-black prothallus—the band of purely fungal tissue at the thallus edge. Because the crust is not layered, the algal partner (Trentepohlia) sits directly beneath the surface and lends a faint orange hue where the thallus is scratched. A few species are lichenicolous, living on other lichens; in these the parasite produces only its reproductive bodies and lacks a thallus of its own. Thin-layer chromatography shows a variable secondary chemistry: some taxa contain acids such as confluentic, gyrophoric, protocetraric or psoromic, while others appear chemically inert.

The sexual fruit bodies are tiny slits or dots immersed in the crust. They range from pin-prick pores to short, narrow lirellae that can be straight, gently curved or, rarely, star-shaped. Their exposed discs are flat and brown-to-black, never dusted with the pale frosting (pruina) seen in certain related genera. The surrounding wall (true exciple) remains thin and stays buried in the thallus, so only the opening is usually visible from above. Inside, the spore layer (hymenium) is threaded by very slender filaments (paraphyses) that branch and fuse near the top but lack the swollen tips typical of many other crustose lichens. Each ascus is long and narrow, splitting open to release either four or eight spindle-shaped ascospores. A microscopy stain with iodine picks out a tiny, dark blue ring around the ocular chamber at the ascus apex, while the rest of the apex often turns pale blue. The spores are colourless, multi-celled (three to sixteen internal walls) and gently tapered at both ends.

Asexual reproduction occurs in microscopic, flask-shaped pycnidia embedded in the crust; these appear as minute, pale-brown specks. Inside, cylindrical conidiogenous cells bud off colourless, rod-shaped conidia that escape through a small pore and help the fungus spread independently of its algal partner. Together, the combination of an immersed thallus lacking a cortex, slit-like apothecia with an inconspicuous wall, very thin paraphyses, iodine-reactive asci and multi-septate spores distinguishes Enterographa from superficially similar crusts on tropical and temperate bark.

== Species ==
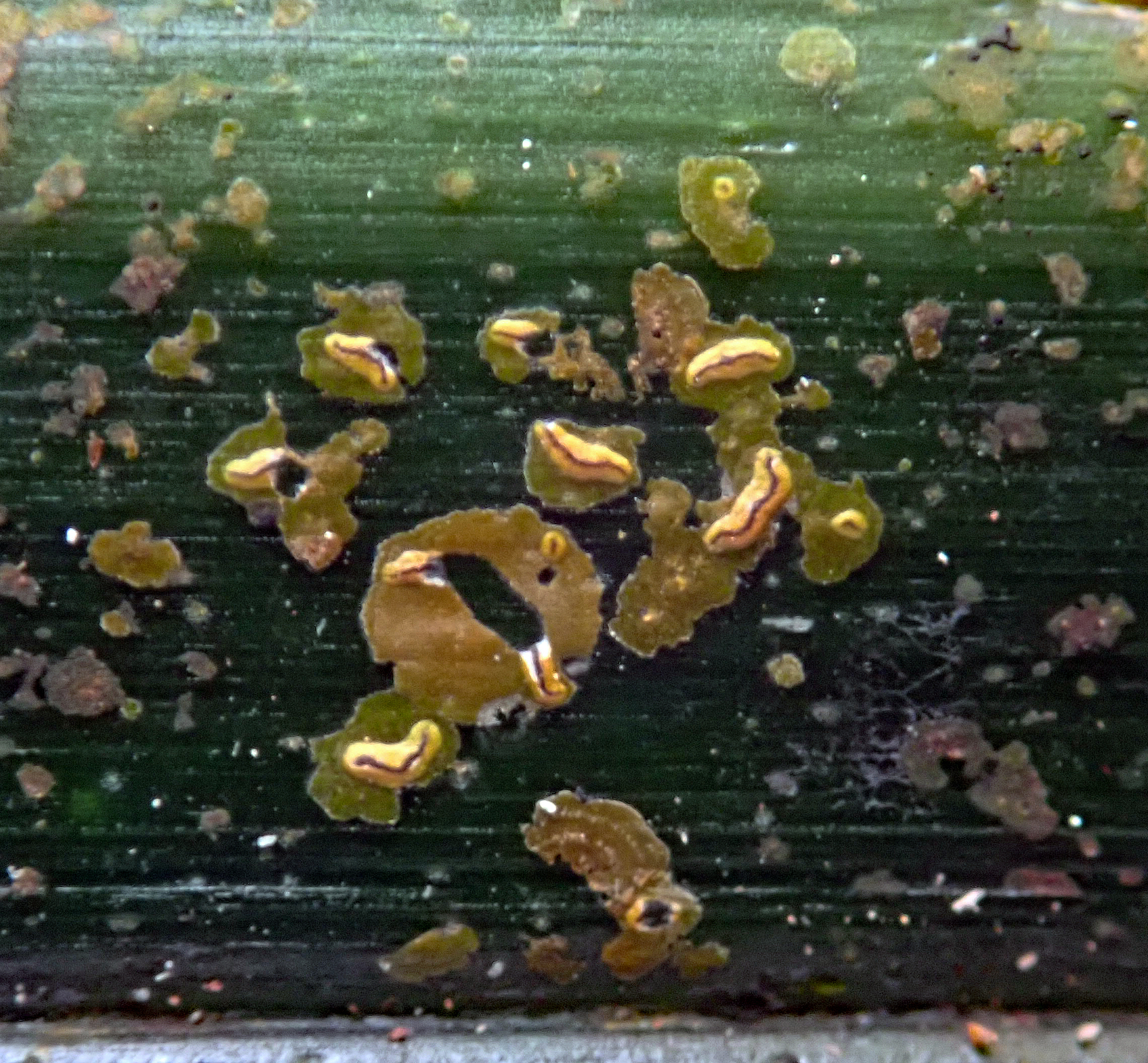
Enterographa bella

As of January 2026, Species Fungorum (via the Catalogue of Life) accepts 78 species of Enterographa.

- Enterographa albopunctata Sparrius (2004)
- Enterographa aldabrensis Sparrius (2009)
- Enterographa bagliettoae Seavey & J.Seavey (2017)
- Enterographa bartlettii Sérus. (1984)
- Enterographa batistae Lücking & Sérus. (1998)
- Enterographa bella R.Sant. (1952)
- Enterographa bengalensis Jagad. Ram, G.P.Sinha & Kr.P.Singh (2008)
- Enterographa bradleyana Seavey & J.Seavey (2014) – United States
- Enterographa brezhonega Sparrius & Aptroot (2007)
- Enterographa byssoidea Lücking (1991)
- Enterographa caudata Seavey & J.Seavey (2014) – United States
- Enterographa chiodectonoides M.Cáceres & Lücking (2007)
- Enterographa compunctula (Nyl.) Redinger (1938)
- Enterographa confusa Ertz & Van den Broeck (2018)
- Enterographa crassa (DC.) Fée (1825)
- Enterographa cretacea P.M.McCarthy & Elix (2016) – Australia
- Enterographa deslooveri Sérus. (1995) – Papua New Guinea
- Enterographa diederichiana Ertz (2009) – Zambia
- Enterographa divergens (Müll.Arg.) Redinger (1939)
- Enterographa dokdoensis S.Y.Kondr., Lőkös, B.G.Lee & Hur (2020) – South Korea
- Enterographa ducouretiana L.Lebreton & Ertz (2023) – New Caledonia
- Enterographa elaborata (Lyell ex Leight.) Coppins & P.James (1979)
- Enterographa elixii Sparrius (2004)
- Enterographa epigraphis Etayo & Sipman (2017)
- Enterographa epiphylla (Sérus.) Ertz, Diederich & Sparrius (2005)
- Enterographa falcata Lücking & V.Wirth (2003)
- Enterographa fauriei Zahlbr. (1944)
- Enterographa fellhaneroides Yeshitela, Eb.Fisch., Killmann & Sérus. (2009)
- Enterographa foliicola Matzer & Lücking (1996)
- Enterographa glaucotremoides Aptroot & M.Cáceres (2018)
- Enterographa hainanensis B.Gao & J.C.Wei (2009)
- Enterographa hutchinsiae (Leight.) A.Massal. (1860)
- Enterographa incognita Ertz & Tehler (2014)
- Enterographa inthanonensis Sparrius (2007)
- Enterographa johnsoniae Seavey & J.Seavey (2017)
- Enterographa kalbii Sparrius (2004)
- Enterographa keylargoensis Seavey & J.Seavey (2017)
- Enterographa kinabaluensis Sparrius & Kalb (2020) – Kota Kinabalu
- Enterographa lecanoracea Sipman (2011)
- Enterographa lecanoroides R.C.Harris (1990)
- Enterographa lichexanthonica M.Cáceres & Aptroot (2017)
- Enterographa littoralis Sipman & Sérus. (1995)
- Enterographa lueckingii Kalb (2001)
- Enterographa mazosiae R.Sant. ex Matzer & R.Sant. (1996)
- Enterographa meklitiae Yeshitela, Eb.Fisch., Killmann & Sérus. (2009)
- Enterographa membranacea P.M.McCarthy & Elix (2018)
- Enterographa micrographa (Nyl.) Redinger (1938)
- Enterographa multilocularis (Müll.Arg.) Sparrius (2004)
- Enterographa multiseptata R.Sant. (1952)
- Enterographa murrayana Seavey & J.Seavey (2013) – United States
- Enterographa nicobarica Jagad.Ram (2016) – India
- Enterographa nitidula Seavey & J.Seavey (2014) – United States
- Enterographa oregonensis Sparrius & Björk (2008)
- Enterographa osagensis C.A.Morse (2013)
- Enterographa pallidella (Nyl.) Redinger (1938)
- Enterographa paruimae Sipman (2016)
- Enterographa perez-higaredae Herrera-Camp. & Lücking (2002)
- Enterographa pertusarioides Groenh. ex Sparrius (2004)
- Enterographa pitardii (B.de Lesd.) Redinger (1938)
- Enterographa punctata Ertz & Diederich (2005)
- Enterographa reticulata P.M.McCarthy (2022)
- Enterographa rotundata M.Cáceres, E.L.Lima & Aptroot (2013)
- Enterographa seawardii Lücking & Henssen (2004)
- Enterographa serusiauxii Lebreton & Aptroot (2020)
- Enterographa seychellensis Vězda & Ceni (2000)
- Enterographa sipmanii Sparrius (2004)
- Enterographa sorediata Coppins & P.James (1979)
- Enterographa sparrii R.Adhikari, Nayaka & Upreti (2025)
- Enterographa subcaudata R.Adhikari, Nayaka & Upreti (2025)
- Enterographa subcervina (Zahlbr.) Ertz (2009)
- Enterographa subgelatinosa (Stirt.) Redinger (1938)
- Enterographa subquassiicola M.Cáceres & Lücking (2007)
- Enterographa tanzanica Kalb (2001)
- Enterographa tropica Sparrius (2004)
- Enterographa vezdae Sparrius (2004)
- Enterographa wijesundarae Weerakoon & Aptroot (2016) – Sri Lanka
- Enterographa zephyri Sparrius (2004)
- Enterographa zonata (Körb.) Källsten ex Torrente & Egea (1989)
