= Enterographa lecanoracea =

Scientific classification
- Kingdom: Fungi
- Division: Ascomycota
- Class: Arthoniomycetes
- Order: Arthoniales
- Family: Roccellaceae
- Genus: Enterographa
- Species: E. lecanoracea

Binomial name
- Enterographa lecanoracea Sipman (2011)

Species of lichen-forming fungus

Enterographa lecanoracea is a species of corticolous (bark-dwelling) crustose lichen in the family Roccellaceae. Found in coastal Chile, it was formally described as a new species in 2011 by the Dutch lichenologist Harrie Sipman. It has round ascomata (fruiting bodies) that measure 0.5–1.5 mm that are sessile to nearly stalked, and a C+ (red) thallus.
