= Enterographa perez-higaredae =

Scientific classification
- Kingdom: Fungi
- Division: Ascomycota
- Class: Arthoniomycetes
- Order: Arthoniales
- Family: Roccellaceae
- Genus: Enterographa
- Species: E. perez-higaredae

Binomial name
- Enterographa perez-higaredae Herrera-Camp. & Lücking (2002)

Species of lichen-forming fungus

Enterographa perez-higaredae is a species of lichen-forming fungus in the family Roccellaceae. It is a leaf-dwelling lichen known from Mexico and has also been reported from Thailand and Sint Eustatius (Caribbean Netherlands). It forms pale grayish to whitish-green patches on the upper surfaces of living leaves. The species is distinguished by its rounded, wart-like fruiting bodies (rather than the narrow elongate structures typical of most Enterographa species) with brown discs and pale margins, and by the presence of conspicuous gray crystals in the internal tissues.

== Taxonomy ==
Enterographa perez-higaredae was described as new in 2002 by María de los Ángeles Herrera-Campos and Robert Lücking from foliicolous (leaf-dwelling) material collected at Los Tuxtlas Tropical Biology Station (Veracruz, Mexico), and placed in the lichen-forming fungal family Roccellaceae. Within Enterographa, it belongs to the small set of leaf-dwelling species that form rounded, wart-like ascomata rather than the more typical narrow, lirellate ones; in the original treatment it is compared most closely with E. batistae from Bahia (Brazil). The two are similar overall, but E. perez-higaredae was distinguished by its leaf-dwelling habit, a thicker thallus, and ascomata (fruiting bodies) with a well-developed sterile basal tissue filled with greyish crystals, together with differences in the hymenial pigmentation and spore dimensions reported in the protologue. The specific epithet honours Gonzalo Perez-Higareda, recognizing his work at Los Tuxtlas and contributions to understanding the station's biota.

== Description ==
The lichen forms a continuous but uneven, pale greyish to whitish-green thallus on the upper surface of living leaves, typically as irregular patches about 5–10 mm across, and contains a filamentous green photobiont identified in the protologue as a species of Trentepohlia or Phycopeltis (with angular to rectangular cells arranged in small plate-like clusters). Its fruiting bodies begin as conspicuous warts and mature into rounded to slightly elongate or irregular ascomata with a fully exposed brown disc and a thin, pale margin. Internally, the excipular tissues include conspicuous grey crystals, and the hymenium is reported as partly brownish in its upper part. Asci contain eight narrowly spindle-shaped (fusiform) ascospores that are typically 7–9-septate and measure about 26–30 × 3–3.5 μm. Typical pycnidia were not observed, but the authors reported that parts of the hymenium are often transformed into small, flask-like cavities lined by a conidiogenous layer, producing oblong-bacillar conidia about 4–5 × 1–1.3 μm.

== Habitat and distribution ==
Enterographa perez-higaredae is a foliicolous (leaf-dwelling) lichen known from the type collection made in May 2001 at Los Tuxtlas Tropical Biology Station in Veracruz, Mexico, within the Los Tuxtlas Biosphere Reserve (Sierra de los Tuxtlas), at about 150–250 m (490–820 ft) elevation. The protologue places the site in tropical moist broadleaf forest and indicates that collecting was carried out across rainforest remnants ranging from undisturbed to disturbed and secondary vegetation, with some sampling extending into subcanopy and canopy leaves. Within that setting, the species occurs on leaf surfaces. The lichen was later reported growing on leaves of Heritiera littoralis in mangrove forest in Ko Kut Trat Province, Thailand. It has also been included in the lichen flora of Sint Eustatius in the Caribbean Netherlands.
