= Bapalmuia =

Scientific classification
- Kingdom: Fungi
- Division: Ascomycota
- Class: Lecanoromycetes
- Order: Lecanorales
- Family: Ectolechiaceae
- Genus: Bapalmuia; Sérus. (1993)

Type species
- Bapalmuia palmularis (Müll.Arg.) Sérus. (1993)

Genus of lichen-forming fungi

Bapalmuia is a genus of lichen-forming fungi in the family Ectolechiaceae.

== Species ==
- Bapalmuia araracuarensis Sipman & Lücking (2008)
- Bapalmuia buchananii (Stirt.) Kalb & Lücking (2000)
- Bapalmuia cacaotica Kalb & Lücking (2000)
- Bapalmuia callichroa (Müll.Arg.) Kalb & Lücking (2000)
- Bapalmuia confusa Kalb & Lücking (2000)
- Bapalmuia consanguinea (Müll.Arg.) Kalb & Lücking (2000)
- Bapalmuia costaricensis Lücking & Kalb (2000)
- Bapalmuia halleana Sérus. (2000)
- Bapalmuia ivoriensis R.Sant. & Lücking (1999)
- Bapalmuia juliae Kalb (2008)
- Bapalmuia lafayetteana (Vain.) Kalb & Lücking (2000)
- Bapalmuia lineata Lücking & Kalb (2000)
- Bapalmuia marginalis (Vain.) Sérus. (1993)
- Bapalmuia microspora Kalb (2020)
- Bapalmuia napoensis Lücking (2008)
- Bapalmuia nigrescens (Müll.Arg.) M.Cáceres & Lücking (2000)
- Bapalmuia palmularis (Müll.Arg.) Sérus. (1993)
- Bapalmuia rotatilis P.M.McCarthy & Elix (2017) – Australia
- Bapalmuia rubicunda (Müll.Arg.) Sérus. (1993)
- Bapalmuia serusiauxiana Van den Broeck, Lücking & Ertz (2014)
- Bapalmuia sorediata Kalb & Lücking (2000)
- Bapalmuia variratae Sérus. (2000)
- Bapalmuia verrucosa Sérus. & Lücking (1998)
