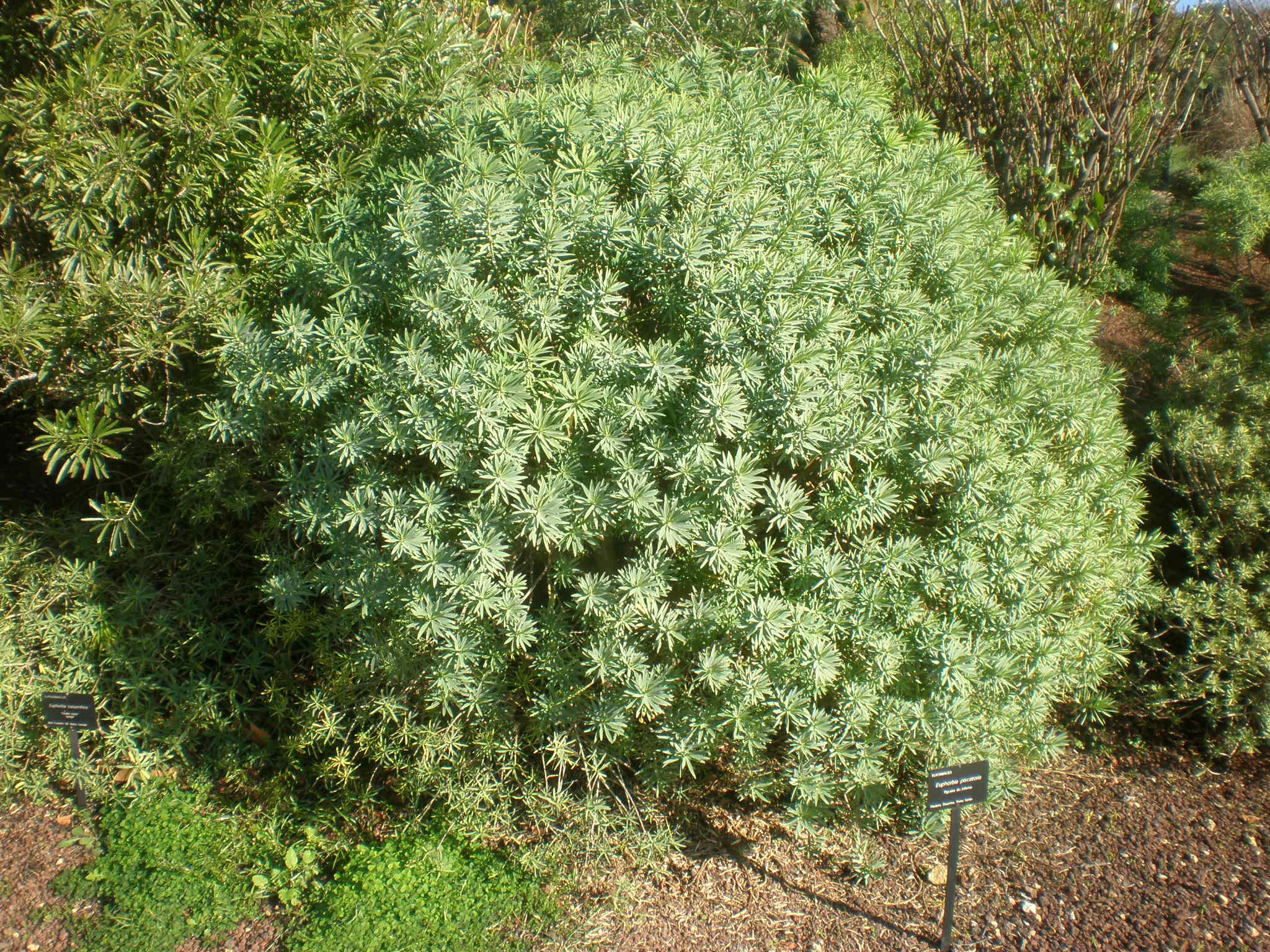

Conservation status
- Least Concern (IUCN 3.1)
- CITES Appendix II

Scientific classification
- Kingdom: Plantae
- Clade: Embryophytes
- Clade: Tracheophytes
- Clade: Spermatophytes
- Clade: Angiosperms
- Clade: Eudicots
- Clade: Rosids
- Order: Malpighiales
- Family: Euphorbiaceae
- Genus: Euphorbia
- Species: E. piscatoria

Binomial name
- Euphorbia piscatoria Aiton

Synonyms
- Tithymalus piscatorius (Aiton) Haw.

= Euphorbia piscatoria =

Species of flowering plant in the spurge family

Euphorbia piscatoria, the fish-stunning spurge, is a species of flowering plant in the spurge family Euphorbiaceae. It is endemic to the Madeira archipelago. This species is a shrubby succulent. As most other succulent members of the genus Euphorbia, its trade is regulated under Appendix II of CITES.
