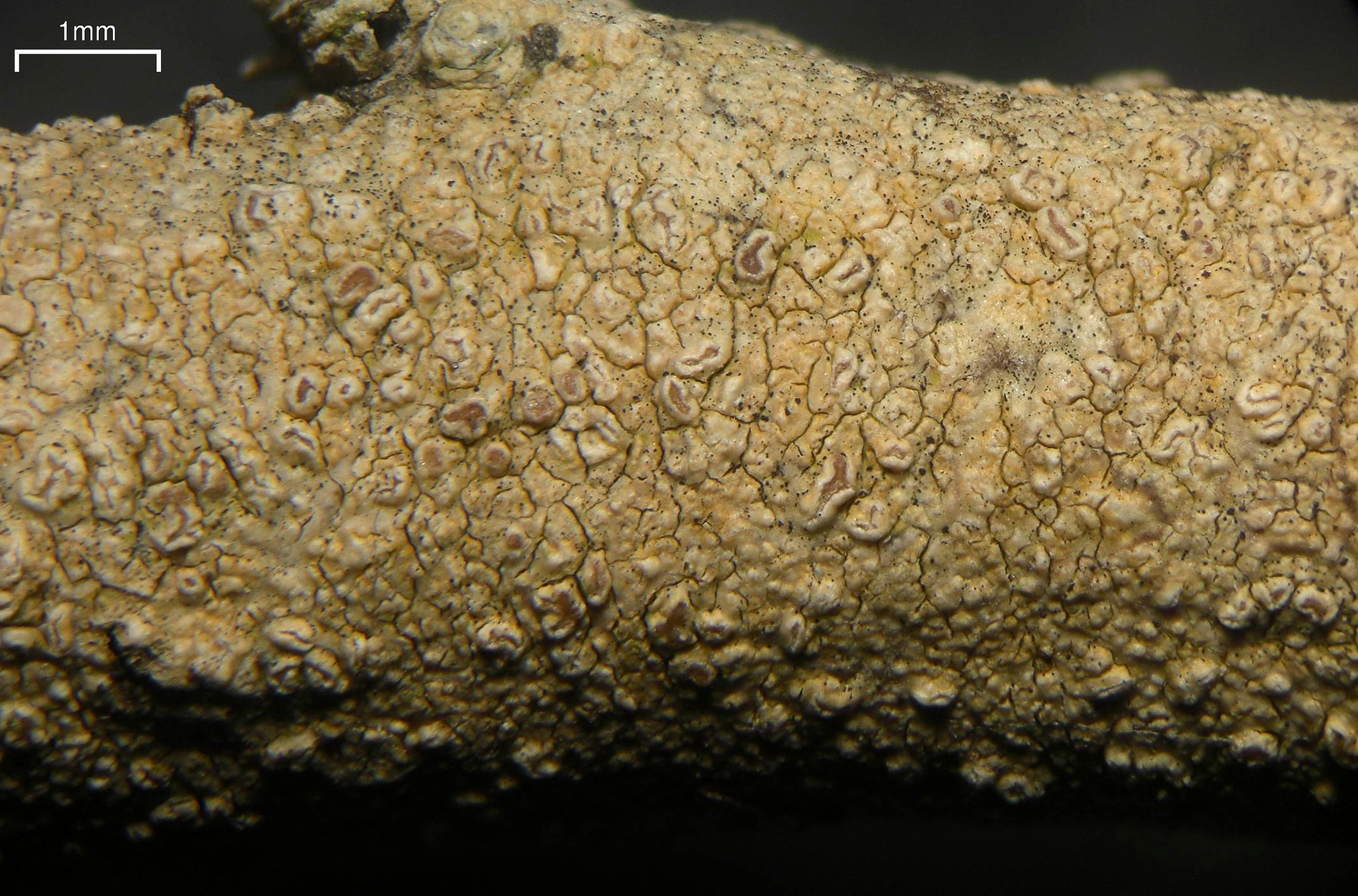

Scientific classification
- Kingdom: Fungi
- Division: Ascomycota
- Class: Arthoniomycetes
- Order: Arthoniales
- Family: Opegraphaceae
- Genus: Nyungwea
- Species: N. anguinella

Binomial name
- Nyungwea anguinella (Nyl.) Aptroot (2017)

Synonyms
- Stigmatidium anguinellum Nyl. (1863); Chiodecton anguinellum (Nyl.) Vain. (1909); Enterographa anguinella (Nyl.) Redinger (1938); Opegrapha anguinella (Nyl.) Ertz & Diederich (2009)

= Nyungwea anguinella =

Species of lichen-forming fungus

Nyungwea anguinella is a species of bark-dwelling crustose lichen in the family Opegraphaceae. It is a common species with a pantropical distribution. It was first formally described by the Finnish lichenologist William Nylander in 1863, as Stigmatidium anguinellum. André Aptroot reclassified it in Nyungwea in 2017.
