= Loflammia =

Scientific classification
- Kingdom: Fungi
- Division: Ascomycota
- Class: Lecanoromycetes
- Order: Lecanorales
- Family: Ectolechiaceae
- Genus: Loflammia; Vězda (1986)

Type species
- Loflammia flammea (Müll.Arg.) Vězda (1986)

Species
- L. epiphylla L. flammea L. gabrielis L. intermedia

Genus of lichen-forming fungi

Loflammia is a small genus of lichen-forming fungi in the family Ectolechiaceae. The genus was established by the Czech lichenologist Antonín Vězda in 1986 to accommodate a group of foliicolous (leaf-dwelling) lichens with distinctive reddish fruiting bodies. These lichens form small greyish-white crusts on the surfaces of living leaves in tropical forests, and are recognised by their bright carmine-red disc-shaped reproductive structures. Species are known from Central and South America, Africa, and Papua New Guinea.

== Taxonomy ==
Loflammia was established by Antonín Vězda in 1986 as one of five new genera created to accommodate species formerly placed in Bacidia and Lopadium that shared a Sporopodium-type ascus structure. These genera—Badimia, Barubria, Calopadia, Loflammia, and Logilvia—were separated from the informal "Lobaca" group that Vězda had introduced in 1983, and all were included in the family Ectolechiaceae because of their characteristic campylidia (specialised conidiomata derived from apothecia).

Vězda designated Loflammia flammea (originally Lopadium flammeum Müll.Arg.) as the type species, and recognised additional species such as L. gabrielis and L. intermedia, which had been discussed by Rolf Santesson in his 1952 monograph on foliicolous lichens. In his description, Vězda noted that Loflammia is closely related to Sporopodium, Tapellaria, and Lasioloma, but can be distinguished from all of them by a combination of features: its reddish apothecia, a paraplectenchymatous exciple (in which the rim tissue around the disc is composed of small, tightly packed cells) that turns yellow to red when treated with potassium hydroxide solution, and distinctive campylidia with red apices. These features, together with its foliicolous habit, were used by Vězda to justify its recognition as a separate genus within the Ectolechiaceae.

== Description ==
Loflammia forms small, scattered thalli (lichen bodies) that are greyish white and sometimes slightly glossy. The apothecia (disc-like fruiting bodies) are constricted at the base and have flat to slightly concave discs that range from dull reddish to carmine red, with a prominent bright-red margin. The rim tissue (excipulum) is paraplectenchymatous (made of tightly packed, brick-like cells) and reacts yellow to red with potassium hydroxide solution (the K test). The layer beneath the hymenium, the hypothecium, is reddish brown and also K+. The paraphyses (slender supporting filaments) are branched and anastomosing (interconnected). The asci are club-shaped (clavate), have an amyloid (iodine-positive) blue-staining apex (tholus), and show the Sporopodium-type structure. The ascospores are usually 3-septate, sometimes partly to fully muriform (divided by both transverse and longitudinal walls).

The campylidia (specialised asexual fruiting structures) are similar in colour to the thallus, but with a red-tinted apex matching the apothecia. These produce simple, ellipsoid, single-celled conidia. Vězda noted that in iodine preparations, the asci of Loflammia resemble those of Sporopodium during early development, though their internal ocular chamber (central cavity) is often difficult to discern. The genus is typified by Loflammia flammea, a species with conspicuously red-brown to crimson apothecia and muriform spores.

== Species ==
- Loflammia epiphylla (Fée) Lücking & Vězda (1999)
- Loflammia flammea (Müll.Arg.) Vězda (1986)
- Loflammia gabrielis (Müll.Arg.) Vězda (1986)
- Loflammia intermedia (R.Sant.) Vězda (1986)

The proposed species Loflammia demoulinii, described 1986 by Emmanuël Sérusiaux from Papua New Guinea, was not validly published.
