= Tapellaria parvimuriformis =

Scientific classification
- Kingdom: Fungi
- Division: Ascomycota
- Class: Lecanoromycetes
- Order: Lecanorales
- Family: Ectolechiaceae
- Genus: Tapellaria
- Species: T. parvimuriformis

Binomial name
- Tapellaria parvimuriformis W.C.Wang & J.C.Wei (2020)

Species of lichen-forming fungus

Tapellaria parvimuriformis is a species of foliicolous (leaf-dwelling), crustose lichen in the family Ectolechiaceae. It is found in Thailand's Khao Yai National Park, where it grows in the shady understory of lowland rainforests.

== Taxonomy ==
Tapellaria parvimuriformis was first scientifically described by Wei-Cheng Wang and Jiang-Chun Wei. The species epithet, parvimuriformis, is a Latin compound derived from parvus ("small") and muriformis (muriform), referring to the small muriform ascospores of this species. The type specimen was found by the first author in Khao Yai National Park, (Nakhon Ratchasima province) at an altitude of 800 m (2,600 ft).

== Description ==
This lichen species is characterized by its pale green, crustose thallus that grows in patches, with a slightly convex surface. Its ascospores are ellipsoid, hyaline, and have dimensions of 20–23 by 10–14 μm; they are muriform (divided into multiple smaller compartments), with 3–5 transverse septa and 0–1 longitudinal septum per segment. The campylidia are sessile, hood-shaped, dark grey with a white-grey base, and contain short, curved conidia that are 45–50 by 2–2.5 μm in size.

=== Similar species ===
Morphologically, Tapellaria parvimuriformis closely resembles Tapellaria floridensis but can be distinguished by its green thallus, grey-white campylidia, and shorter conidia (45–50 μm long). It is also similar to T. schindleri, which has a distorted apothecial margin with blue pruina, smaller ascospores, and longer conidia. Another closely related species is T. granulosa, which has a granulose thallus and pure black apothecia. However, all three similar species are corticolous, and their distribution is restricted to the Neotropics.

== Habitat and distribution ==
Tapellaria parvimuriformis has only been found in Khao Yai National Park, Thailand, where it grows on leaf surfaces in the shady understory of lowland rainforests near rivers. The species is not abundant in its known habitat. Two Tapellaria species, T. nigrata and T. parvimuriformis, are found in Khao Yai National Park, with the former being more common and displaying different ascospore and apothecia characteristics.
