= Logilvia =

Scientific classification
- Kingdom: Fungi
- Division: Ascomycota
- Class: Lecanoromycetes
- Order: Lecanorales
- Family: Ectolechiaceae
- Genus: Logilvia; Vèzda (1986)
- Species: L. gilva

Binomial name
- Logilvia gilva (Müll.Arg.) Vězda (1986)

Synonyms
- Lopadium gilvum Müll.Arg. (1890)

Single-species fungal genus

Logilvia is a single-species fungal genus in the family Ectolechiaceae. Logilvia gilva, the sole species, is a thin, pale crust growing on the surface of living leaves in humid tropical forests, where it forms an inconspicuous yellowish-grey film visible to the naked eye. The genus has been recorded from tropical America, including Guatemala, Brazil, Cuba, and Costa Rica, as well as the temperate rainforests of southern Chile. The genus was established to accommodate a species that had long been recognised as anomalous within existing genera, and is distinguished by an unusual combination of reduced fruiting body structure and the presence of algal cells in the uppermost tissue of the apothecium.

== Taxonomy ==
Logilvia was one of five genera newly established by Antonín Vězda in 1986 to accommodate foliicolous (leaf-dwelling) lichens with a Sporopodium-type ascus structure that had been scattered through the large, artificial genera Bacidia and Lopadium. These taxa were placed in the family Ectolechiaceae—alongside Tapellaria and Lasioloma—because all possess campylidia (specialised asexual conidiomata derived from apothecia). Vězda's revision formally divided his earlier informal "Lobaca" assemblage into two lines based on ascus type: the Byssoloma lineage, assigned to Fellhanera in the Pilocarpaceae (since synonymized with Ectolechiaceae), and the Sporopodium lineage, which included Logilvia.

The genus was published as monospecific, containing only Logilvia gilva (originally Lopadium gilvum Müll.Arg.), which Vězda designated as the type species. He noted that the species had already been singled out by Rolf Santesson in 1952 for its isolated position among foliicolous "Lopadium" species. The combination of a very reduced exciple, the presence of algal cells in the epithecium, and campylidia bearing ellipsoid conidia distinguished Logilvia from other genera of the Ectolechiaceae.

== Description ==
Logilvia has a continuous, dull, grey-yellow thallus (the lichen body) forming a thin, even crust. The apothecia (sexual fruiting bodies) are constricted at the base and from the beginning lack a distinct margin, appearing convex with a yellowish-brown ("luteo-fuscous") disk. The rim tissue (excipulum) is thin and merges gradually into the hymenium (the spore-bearing layer) without a clear boundary. Above the hymenium, the epithecium (uppermost layer) is covered with small algal cells, an unusual feature among related genera.

The paraphyses (filamentous supporting cells) are branched and anastomosing (interconnected), and the asci are furnished with amyloid tholi (apical domes that stain blue in iodine-based reagents) of the Sporopodium type. Each ascus contains a single, muriform ascospore—that is, a thick-walled spore divided by both transverse and longitudinal septa.

The genus also develops campylidia (specialised asexual conidiomata), which produce ellipsoid conidia. Vězda noted that the combination of a highly reduced exciple, the presence of algal cells within the epithecium, and the distinctive campylidia were the main features separating Logilvia from other genera of the Ectolechiaceae.

== Habitat and distribution ==
Vězda recorded the genus from tropical America, with collections from Guatemala, Brazil, and Cuba. The foliicolous (leaf-dwelling) Logilvia gilva was later found in the Valdivian temperate forests of Chile. The lichen was included in the first annotated checklist of Costa Rican fungi in 2024.
