= Tapellaria intermedia =

Scientific classification
- Kingdom: Fungi
- Division: Ascomycota
- Class: Lecanoromycetes
- Order: Lecanorales
- Family: Ectolechiaceae
- Genus: Tapellaria
- Species: T. intermedia

Binomial name
- Tapellaria intermedia Flakus & Lücking (2008)
- Holotype: near lake Copaiba, Reyes Municipality, Bolivia

Species of lichen-forming fungus

Tapellaria intermedia is a little-known species of foliicolous (leaf-dwelling) crustose lichen in the family Ectolechiaceae. It occurs in Bolivia.

== Taxonomy ==
Tapellaria intermedia was formally described as new to science in 2008 by the lichenologists Adam Flakus and Robert Lücking. The type specimen was collected by Flakus by lake Copaiba near Reyes village in José Ballivián Province (Beni Department, Bolivia), where it was found growing on the plant leaves in the Amazon rainforest at an elevation of 189 m (620 ft). The species epithet alludes to morphology of its ascospores, which are intermediate (in terms of size and septation) between two similar species, Tapellaria nigrata and T. molleri.

== Description ==
Tapellaria intermedia forms a thin layer (the thallus) on the surface of leaves. This layer appears as small, scattered patches, each measuring 0.1–0.6 mm in diameter. These patches often merge in the centre of the lichen. The thallus is smooth and pale greyish-green in colour, with a faint whitish hypothallus. The lichen's algal partner is a type of green alga with round cells, measuring 4–7 μm in diameter. The fungal partner produces small, disc-shaped reproductive structures called apothecia. These are 0.15–0.4 mm in diameter, sit directly on the leaf surface, and are slightly constricted at the base. The apothecia are black, with a persistent rim (margin) that becomes less noticeable as the structure ages. Beneath the apothecium, there is a layer with a blue-green (aerugineous) tinge.

Inside the apothecia are structures called asci, which produce the lichen's spores. Each ascus contains eight spores. The spores are colourless and have a complex structure with multiple cross-walls (septa) and occasional lengthwise walls, measuring 35–65 by 5–8 μm. Various other microscopic features are important for identifying this species, including the structure of the apothecium rim (excipulum), the hypothecium, and the branching threads (paraphyses) that grow between the asci.

== Habitat and distribution ==
As of its initial description, Tapellaria intermedia had only been found in one location: near Reyes village in the Beni Department of Bolivia. This area is part of the lowland southwest Amazon rainforest. The lichen was discovered in an "island" of rainforest surrounded by savanna vegetation. It was found growing on the leaves of an unspecified vascular plant, which is typical for foliicolous lichens. These organisms are specially adapted to live on the surface of leaves in humid, tropical environments.

The lichen has since been recorded from two locations in the Manuripi-Heath Amazonian Wildlife National Reserve in the Manuripi Province.
