= Tapellaria isidiata =

Scientific classification
- Kingdom: Fungi
- Division: Ascomycota
- Class: Lecanoromycetes
- Order: Lecanorales
- Family: Ectolechiaceae
- Genus: Tapellaria
- Species: T. isidiata

Binomial name
- Tapellaria isidiata Kalb & Aptroot (2021)

Species of lichen-forming fungus

Tapellaria isidiata is a species of corticolous (bark-dwelling) crustose lichen in the family Ectolechiaceae. Described as a new species in 2021, it was discovered growing on tree bark on a beach in Cameroon and is distinctive for being the first species in its genus to produce isidia, small cone-shaped structures used for vegetative reproduction. The lichen forms a thin, glossy, greyish crust with a distinctive black border and produces large fruiting bodies containing unusually large ascospores.

== Taxonomy ==
The lichen was described as a new species in 2021 by the lichenologists Klaus Kalb and André Aptroot. The type was collected from Campo (South Province), where it was found growing on tree bark on a beach. The lichen has a glossy, mineral-grey thallus with whitish patches, and is bordered by a thin black hypothallus. The specific epithet isidiata refers to the presence of isidia, a characteristic of this species: it is the first in genus Tapellaria to have vegetative propagules.

== Description ==
The lichen forms a thin, glossy crust (thallus) only about 0.05–0.1 mm thick, coloured mineral grey but often mottled with almost-white patches. A narrow jet-black band of loose hyphae (the hypothallus) 0.2–0.6 mm wide traces the margin where the colony spreads across the bark. Along and just inside this edge stand numerous isidia—tiny, cone-shaped outgrowths that serve as ready-made propagules because they contain both the fungus and its green-algal partner. Each isidium is roughly 50 micrometres (μm) wide at the base, tapers to a paler tip, and can reach about 100 μm tall; branching is rare and they are most abundant around the thallus perimeter.

Fruiting bodies (apothecia) sit directly on the surface, attached by a broad base yet appearing slightly pinched where they meet the thallus. They are black, circular to weakly lobed, and vary from 0.2 to 0.8 mm in diameter. Their discs are generally flat, matt to faintly shiny, and often look granular, while the encircling rim is the same height as the disc and about 0.1 mm wide. In vertical section the cup wall (excipulum) shows a patchy purplish-brown interior that merges seamlessly with a similar-coloured supporting tissue (hypothecium). Overlying the spore layer (hymenium) is an almost black epihymenium. Each ascus contains only two ascospores, but these are large, densely divided into brick-like chambers (muriform), colourless, and measure 33–36 × 13.5–15.5 μm. No asexual pycnidia or lichen products have been detected, and standard spot tests are negative.
