= Byssoloma fuscothallinum =

Scientific classification
- Kingdom: Fungi
- Division: Ascomycota
- Class: Lecanoromycetes
- Order: Lecanorales
- Family: Ectolechiaceae
- Genus: Byssoloma
- Species: B. fuscothallinum

Binomial name
- Byssoloma fuscothallinum Lücking (2006)

Species of lichen-forming fungus

Byssoloma fuscothallinum is a species of foliicolous (leaf-dwelling) lichen in the family Ectolechiaceae. Found in Colombia and French Guiana, it was formally described as a new species in 2006 by the lichenologist Robert Lücking.

== Description ==
The physical appearance of B. fuscothallinum is marked by a crustose thallus with a continuous, diffuse, effuse pattern and an upper surface of a brownish colour, ranging from pale fawn to mid-cinnamon. The thallus' upper surface lacks a pruina, a whitish, powdery deposit that covers parts of some lichens, and is generally smooth and devoid of any specific structures.

Byssoloma fuscothallinum has ascomata that may vary in their level of immersion. When present, the apothecia, or spore-producing structures, are small (between 0.2 and 0.3 mm), semi-immersed to emergent, and feature a flat to slightly convex disc of a brownish hue, similar to the thallus' colour. The margin surface of the apothecium appears white to yellowish-white, giving contrast to its brownish central disc.

A distinctive feature of B. fuscothallinum is its lecanoralean asci, the sac in which the spores are formed. The tholus, or apical part of the asci, is thickened, showcasing an amyloid reaction (a change in colour when stained with iodine) and exhibiting an amyloid tube or ring pattern. Each ascus typically contains eight oblong ascospores, which are hyaline, measuring between 8.0 and 11.0 μm in length and 2.0–2.5 μm in width. These spores are transversely septate, meaning they have one or more crosswalls. B. fuscothallinum does not produce any secondary metabolites. However, it maintains a symbiotic relationship with a primary photobiont, specifically, a trebouxiaceous, chlorococcoid alga, which supplies the lichen with essential nutrients.

== Habitat and distribution ==
The holotype specimen of B. fuscothallinum was collected by Lücking in French Guiana in 1995, where it was found growing on leaves in a forest understory. It also occurs in Colombia.
