= Eugeniella =

Scientific classification
- Kingdom: Fungi
- Division: Ascomycota
- Class: Lecanoromycetes
- Order: Lecanorales
- Family: Ectolechiaceae
- Genus: Eugeniella; Lücking, Sérus. & Kalb (2008)

Type species
- Eugeniella psychotriae (Müll.Arg.) Lücking, Sérus. & Kalb (2008)

Genus of lichens

Eugeniella is a genus of mostly leaf-dwelling (foliicolous) lichens in the family Ectolechiaceae. It contains 13 species. The genus was circumscribed in 2008 by lichenologists Robert Lücking, Emmanuël Sérusiaux, and Klaus Kalb, with Eugeniella psychotriae assigned as the type species. This lichen was originally called Patellaria psychotriae by Johannes Müller Argoviensis in 1881. The seven species that were initially included in the genus had previously been placed in the genera Bacidia (sensu lato) and Byssoloma. Several newly identified species from Australasia and Central and South America were later added. Most of the species grow on leaves, although four of the Australasian species grow on bark.

The genus name of Eugeniella is in honour of Eugênia Cristina Gonçalves Pereira (b.1960), a Brazilian botanist (Mycology and Lichenology) and Professor at the Federal University of Pernambuco in Recife, Brasil.

== Species ==
As of May 2021, Species Fungorum accepts 13 species of Eugeniella. The species distributions given in the list below are from McCarthy and Elix 2019.

- Eugeniella atrichoides (Malme) Lücking, Sérus. & Kalb (2008) – Brazil
- Eugeniella corallifera (Lücking) Lücking, Sérus. & Kalb (2008) – neotropics
- Eugeniella farinosa P.M.McCarthy & Elix (2016) – Australia
- Eugeniella leucocheila (Tuck.) Lücking, Sérus. & Kalb (2008) – neotropics; southeastern United States; tropical Africa
- Eugeniella micrommata (Kremp.) Lücking, Sérus. & Kalb (2008) – pantropical
- Eugeniella newtoniana (Henriq.) Lücking, Sérus. & Kalb (2008) – Costa Rica; West Africa; Thailand
- Eugeniella nigrodisca M.Cáceres, D.S.Andrade & Aptroot (2013) – Brazil
- Eugeniella ortizii (Lücking) Lücking, Sérus. & Kalb (2008) – neotropics
- Eugeniella pacifica P.M.McCarthy & Elix (2019) – Norfolk Island
- Eugeniella palleola Breuss & Lücking (2015) – Nicaragua
- Eugeniella psychotriae (Müll.Arg.) Lücking, Sérus. & Kalb (2008) – neotropics
- Eugeniella usnica P.M.McCarthy & Elix (2016) – Australia
- Eugeniella zeorina P.M.McCarthy & Elix (2019) – Norfolk Island
