= Byssoloma xanthonicum =

Scientific classification
- Kingdom: Fungi
- Division: Ascomycota
- Class: Lecanoromycetes
- Order: Lecanorales
- Family: Ectolechiaceae
- Genus: Byssoloma
- Species: B. xanthonicum

Binomial name
- Byssoloma xanthonicum Aptroot (2014)

Species of lichen

Byssoloma xanthonicum is a species of corticolous (bark-dwelling), crustose lichen in the family Ectolechiaceae. It is found in New Caledonia.

== Taxonomy ==
The lichen was formally described by the Dutch lichenologist André Aptroot in 2014. The type specimen was collected near Farino in New Caledonia, at an elevation of about 300 m (980 ft). Byssoloma xanthonicum is one of the few corticolous species within the genus Byssoloma.

== Description ==
Byssoloma xanthonicum has a thin, non-corticate (without a cortex), and continuous thallus (the main body of the lichen) that is cream-coloured with a dull appearance. It is bordered by a thin brown line known as the prothallus. The algae within the thallus are chlorococcoid (green and spherical). The species features sessile (directly attached) apothecia, which are the fruiting bodies, measuring 0.2–0.6 mm in diameter. These apothecia are round but often lobate (lobed) in shape, with a flat, dull, dark brown disc that is not pruinose (powdery). The margin surrounding the disc is cream to chamois-coloured, dull, and has a felty texture, approximately 0.05 mm wide. The hymenium (spore-bearing layer) is 25–35 μm high, hyaline (translucent) but becomes brownish at the base due to diluted pigment from the hypothecium. The paraphyses (sterile filaments in the hymenium) are branched. The hypothecium (tissue beneath the hymenium) is dark brown, coloured by a concentrated pigment. The excipulum (outer layer of the apothecia) is hyaline and composed of anastomosing (interconnecting) hyphae approximately 3 μm wide. The ascus (spore-bearing cell) is of the Pilocarpaceae-type, with a tholus (central part) that reacts pale blue to iodine-potassium iodide (IKI) staining and has a darker blue tube inside. Each ascus contains 8 ascospores. These spores are hyaline, fusiform (spindle-shaped), 3-septate (having three divisions), measuring 11–13 by 2.5–3.5 μm, and are slightly constricted at the septa (divisions). Pycnidia (asexual reproductive structures) were not observed in this species.

The thallus of Byssoloma xanthonicum fluoresces a yellow-orange colour when lit with a ultraviolet light, owing to the presence of the compound lichexanthone. It additionally has a K+ (yellow-red) reaction, a result of norstictic acid.

=== Similar species ===
Byssoloma xanthonicum bears a resemblance in thallus and apothecium colour to B. chlorinum. However, it differs significantly in its chemical composition, most notably demonstrated by its strong UV+ (yellow-orange) reaction. Xanthones, a type of chemical compound, are known in Byssoloma, notably in B. meadii. Compared to B. meadii, Byssoloma xanthonicum stands out due to its pale hypothecium and is more similar in colour and appearance to B. leucoblepharum.
