= Tapellaria albomarginata =

Scientific classification
- Kingdom: Fungi
- Division: Ascomycota
- Class: Lecanoromycetes
- Order: Lecanorales
- Family: Ectolechiaceae
- Genus: Tapellaria
- Species: T. albomarginata

Binomial name
- Tapellaria albomarginata Lücking (2011)
- Holotype: Caño Island Biological Reserve, Costa Rica

Species of lichen

Tapellaria albomarginata is a species of lichen-forming fungus in the family Ectolechiaceae. Known from Costa Rica, it was described as new to science in 2011. This foliicolous lichen grows directly on living leaves in the humid, shaded lower canopy of lowland rainforests. It is recognised by its small, black, dot-like fruiting bodies that are surrounded by a distinctive white, powdery rim.

== Taxonomy ==
Tapellaria albomarginata was formally described by Robert Lücking in 2011, based on material collected from foliage in lowland rainforest on Isla del Caño, Costa Rica. The specific epithet―literally "white-margined"―refers to the conspicuous, pale, powder-dusted rim that encircles each fruit-body. Comparative morphology places the species firmly within the mostly tropical genus Tapellaria, which is characterised by black, lecideine apothecia, Ectolechiaceae-type asci and hood-shaped campylidia.

== Description ==
The lichen forms scattered, roundish patches that often coalesce into whitish islands 10–25 mm across but only 10–15 micrometres (μm) thick. Because the thallus lacks an outer skin (ecorticate), its surface appears smooth and somewhat translucent.

Reproductive structures are small, more or less circular apothecia 0.3–0.5 mm in diameter that sit atop the thallus like black dots. Their discs are flat to slightly sunken and remain jet-black, while the surrounding rim is dusted with a pale grey to white powder (pruina); in damaged or ageing specimens this rim may darken and lose the bloom. A narrow band of pale-brown tissue (the excipulum) supports the disc, and beneath it a dark brown layer (hypothecium) turns purple in potassium hydroxide solution, a useful field test for the species. Internally, the clear spore-producing layer (hymenium) measures about 50–60 μm high. Each club-shaped ascus contains six to eight colourless ascospores; these spores are ellipsoid, divided by three (occasionally four) cross-walls, and measure 14–20 × 3–6 μm—roughly three to five times longer than wide.

Asexual propagules develop in distinctive hood-shaped outgrowths (campylidia) 0.3–0.5 mm wide whose flaps roll inwards to shield the spore layer. They release long, thread-like conidia with three to seven internal walls (20–40 × 2–2.5 μm). These conidia often depart with a few algal cells attached, allowing the lichen to establish when they land on a new leaf. Thin-layer chromatography detects no secondary metabolites in the thallus.

== Similar species ==
Among others in the genus, T. albomarginata could be confused with the similarly small-thallus T. bilimbioides (Palaeotropics) and T. leonorae (Neotropics). It differs from the former by its persistently white-pruinose apothecial margin and from the latter by having smaller ascospores divided by only three cross-walls (septa) rather than seven.

The palaeotropical Tapellaria palaeotropica is perhaps most likely to be mistaken for T. albomarginata, as both inhabit leaf surfaces and bear small, transversely septate spores. T. palaeotropica, known only from the summit rainforests of Mahé in the Seychelles, has slightly larger spores (20–30 × 4–6 μm with three to five cross-walls), a purplish-brown excipulum, and uniformly black apothecia lacking any powdery bloom. In contrast, T. albomarginata has smaller spores (14–20 × 3–6 μm with three to four septa), a pale-brown excipulum, and the diagnostic white or grey pruina around each apothecial disc. The species are also geographically separated, with T. palaeotropica confined to western Indian Ocean islands while T. albomarginata occurs in lowland Neotropical rainforests.

== Habitat and distribution ==
Tapellaria albomarginata is known from moist, low-elevation forests in the Neotropics, so far reported only along coastal areas of Costa Rica. It grows directly on the surfaces of living leaves (foliicolous), favouring the shaded but humid microclimate of the lower rainforest canopy. Within this niche it appears to be locally common, yet its restricted geographic range suggests a genuine, though probably wider, tropical lowland distribution awaiting further exploration. Tapellaria albomarginata is one of eleven Tapellaria species to have been documented from Costa Rica.
