= Byssoloma spinulosum =

Scientific classification
- Kingdom: Fungi
- Division: Ascomycota
- Class: Lecanoromycetes
- Order: Lecanorales
- Family: Ectolechiaceae
- Genus: Byssoloma
- Species: B. spinulosum

Binomial name
- Byssoloma spinulosum Sérus. (2011)

Species of lichen-forming fungus

Byssoloma spinulosum is a species of foliicolous) (leaf-dwelling) lichen in the family Ectolechiaceae. Found in Papua New Guinea, it was described as new to science in 2011. It is characterized by its unique beaked pycnidia (asexual fruiting bodies) that are predominantly developed along the margins of living leaves.

== Taxonomy ==
Byssoloma spinulosum was first scientifically described by Belgian lichenologist Emmanuël Sérusiaux in 2011. He collected the type specimen in a montane forest in the Owen Stanley Range (Northern Province) at an altitude between 2,100 and 2,400 m (6,900 and 7,900 ft). The species epithet spinulosum—derived from the Latin word for "tiny spines"—alludes to the characteristic pycnidia that appear like small spines along the leaf margins.

== Description ==
This lichen species typically grows along the margins and scars of living leaves, forming irregularly shaped patches that are whitish to pale bluish in colour. When viewed under high magnification, the thallus appears cottony, with a white prothallus sometimes visible between the patches.

The apothecia are rounded and measure 0.3 to 0.6 mm in diameter, with a pale yellowish to whitish margin that is typically byssoid, especially in young apothecia. The disc of the apothecia is initially slightly concave before becoming flat and bluish-black.

A key distinguishing feature of Byssoloma spinulosum is the presence of beaked pycnidia, which are predominantly developed along the margins of leaves. These structures are conical or nearly so, with a short, distinct beak measuring 0.15 to 0.25 mm in height and around 0.2 mm in diameter.

=== Similar species ===
Byssoloma spinulosum shares similarities with other foliicolous lichens in the order Lecanorales that possess beaked pycnidia. However, the position of the pycnidia along the leaf margins, as well as differences in apothecial size and the color of the hypothecium, set it apart from closely related species such as Byssoloma humboldtianum.

== Habitat and distribution ==
Byssoloma spinulosum is primarily found in the understory of montane rainforests. It has been documented in two localities within the mountains of Papua New Guinea, including the Northern Province and Madang Province. The lichen grows on living leaves, often forming patches that are more than 1 cm (2/5 in) in diameter.
