= Septotrapelia multiseptata =

Scientific classification
- Kingdom: Fungi
- Division: Ascomycota
- Class: Lecanoromycetes
- Order: Lecanorales
- Family: Ectolechiaceae
- Genus: Septotrapelia
- Species: S. multiseptata

Binomial name
- Septotrapelia multiseptata Aptroot & K.H.Moon (2014)

Species of lichen

Septotrapelia multiseptata is a species of bryophilous (moss-dwelling) lichen in the family Byssolomataceae. Found in South Korea, it was formally described as a new species in 2014 by lichenologists André Aptroot and Kwang-Hee Moon. The type specimens were collected by the first author from Mabok-san mountain (Goheung County, South Jeolla Province) at altitudes between 200 and 500 m (660 and 1,640 ft); there, the lichen was overgrowing mosses that were growing on siliceous rock. It has a thin (less than 0.1 mm thick) mottled greyish and olive green thallus covering areas of up to about 15 cm (6 in). The thallus lacks a cortex; rather, it comprises small, irregularly shaped areoles on a somewhat gelatinous crust. The photobiont partner of the lichen is an myrmecioid green alga, which measures 2–4 μm in diameter. Ascospores of the lichen have a long ellipsoid shape, and measure 17–20 by 6.5–7.5 μm. The species epithet multiseptata refers to the 5 or 6 septa that divide the ascospores into chambers.
