= Sporopodium isidiatum =

Scientific classification
- Kingdom: Fungi
- Division: Ascomycota
- Class: Lecanoromycetes
- Order: Lecanorales
- Family: Ectolechiaceae
- Genus: Sporopodium
- Species: S. isidiatum

Binomial name
- Sporopodium isidiatum Sérus. & Lücking (2008)

Species of lichen-forming fungus

Sporopodium isidiatum is a species of lichen-forming fungus in the family Ectolechiaceae. It grows as small, rounded, pale green to grey patches that are densely covered with tiny upright finger-like outgrowths (isidia), on living leaves in tropical montane (mountain) forests and on bark in lowland areas. It is distinguished by large, dark, hood-shaped asexual structures, and by a characteristic set of lichen substances, including yellow pigments. It was formally described in 2008 from specimens collected in Papua New Guinea and Sri Lanka. These widely separated records suggest that it may be more widespread in tropical south-east Asia than the current records show.

== Taxonomy ==
Sporopodium isidiatum was described as new to science in 2008 by Emmanuël Sérusiaux and Robert Lücking, from material collected in Papua New Guinea and Sri Lanka. It was distinguished from other Sporopodium species by its thallus (lichen body) covered with isidia (small outgrowths), together with very dark, nearly black campylidia (hood-like asexual structures) that produce conidia (asexual spores).

The type specimen (the reference specimen for the name) was collected in Madang Province (Papua New Guinea) near Bundi village, on living leaves on a forested slope at 1,300–1,500 m. The holotype is kept in the herbarium of the University of Liège (LG), and a duplicate (isotype) is in the Field Museum (F). Other specimens are known from montane (mountain) forest at Gahavisuka Provincial Park in the Eastern Highlands of Papua New Guinea, and from southern Sri Lanka (the Kanneliya Forest), where it was collected on bark at about 90 m.

== Description ==
Sporopodium isidiatum forms rounded thalli, typically about 1.0–1.5 cm across (occasionally to about 2.5 cm), with an indistinct edge and sometimes a thin, whitish prothallus made of radiating hyphae (fungal threads). The surface is finely farinose (powdery), dull, pale greenish to pale grey, often with a bluish hue. The thallus is covered with numerous short, upright, cylindrical outgrowths (isidia). They are about 0.1–0.2 mm tall (rarely to 0.3 mm) and 0.05–0.1 mm wide, unbranched, and contain abundant oxalate crystals. The main photobiont (photosynthetic partner) is a green alga (probably Trebouxia). The thallus also commonly bears bluish cephalodia (small patches) containing the cyanobacterium Scytonema.

A given thallus typically produces either apothecia (sexual fruiting bodies) or campylidia (asexual structures), but not both. Campylidia are large and conspicuous (about 0.7–1.0 mm tall), typically all oriented in the same direction; the base is pale orange-brown, while the hood and cup-shaped portion become dark brown to almost black. Conidia are produced abundantly. They are colourless (hyaline), without internal walls (non-septate), usually tear-shaped, and measure about 8–10 μm long and about 3 μm wide (rarely to 3.5 μm). When present, apothecia are biatorine, about 0.9–1.2 mm wide, with a prominent whitish margin and a grey to nearly black disc. Each ascus contains a single ascospore. The spore is narrowly ellipsoid, strongly muriform (divided into many small compartments), and measures 91–118 μm long and 19–25 μm wide, with a distinct halo visible in water. Chemical analysis found 2,7-dichlorolichexanthone and zeorin as the main compounds, with pannarin and several additional chlorinated xanthones present in smaller amounts.

== Habitat and distribution ==
In Papua New Guinea, Sporopodium isidiatum is known from two montane (mountain) forest localities (about 1,300–2,450 m), where it grows on living leaves in relatively undisturbed forest. It has been collected only rarely in Papua New Guinea, despite surveys across many rainforest sites. In Sri Lanka, it has been found on bark at much lower elevation (about 90 m). Taken together, the widely separated records from Papua New Guinea and Sri Lanka suggest that the species may occur more widely in tropical south-east Asia.
