= Eugeniella palleola =

Scientific classification
- Kingdom: Fungi
- Division: Ascomycota
- Class: Lecanoromycetes
- Order: Lecanorales
- Family: Ectolechiaceae
- Genus: Eugeniella
- Species: E. palleola

Binomial name
- Eugeniella palleola Breuss & Lücking (2015)

Species of lichen-forming fungus

Eugeniella palleola is a species of corticolous (bark-dwelling) in the family Ectolechiaceae. Found in Nicaragua, it was formally described as a new species in 2015 by lichenologists Othmar Breuss and Robert Lücking. The type specimen was collected by Breuss in a montane rainforest on the Mombacho volcano (Granada ) at an altitude of 1,100 m (3,600 ft); here it was found growing on the smooth bark of small stems. The specific epithet palleola, meaning "rather pale", refers to the shade of the apothecial discs, which are lighter than other species of Eugeniella. Secondary chemicals that occur in the lichen include atranorin, stictic acid, and minor amounts of norstictic acid.
