= Roccellinastrum lagarostrobi =

Scientific classification
- Kingdom: Fungi
- Division: Ascomycota
- Class: Lecanoromycetes
- Order: Lecanorales
- Family: Ectolechiaceae
- Genus: Roccellinastrum
- Species: R. lagarostrobi

Binomial name
- Roccellinastrum lagarostrobi Kantvilas (1990)

Species of lichen-forming fungus

Roccellinastrum lagarostrobi is a rare species of byssoid (wispy) lichen in the family Ectolechiaceae. Found in Australia, it was formally described as a new species in 1990 by lichenologist Gintaras Kantvilas. The type specimen was collected from Pine Creek, north of Greystone bluff (Tasmania) at an altitude of 140 m (460 ft); here, along the bank of a stream, at the edge of a rainforest, the lichen was found growing as an epiphyte on leafy twigs of the endemic conifer Lagarostrobos franklinii. It has a white, cottony (byssoid) thallus that forms irregularly shaped tufts typically measuring 2–4 mm wide. The lichen produces the chemical protocetraric acid. The species epithet lagarostrobi refers to the genus of the phorophyte. It is only known to occur at a few locations in Tasmania; its diminutive size and somewhat inconspicuous appearance makes it easy to miss.
