= Tapellaria floridensis =

Scientific classification
- Kingdom: Fungi
- Division: Ascomycota
- Class: Lecanoromycetes
- Order: Lecanorales
- Family: Ectolechiaceae
- Genus: Tapellaria
- Species: T. floridensis

Binomial name
- Tapellaria floridensis Common & Lücking (2011)

Species of lichen-forming fungus

Tapellaria floridensis is a species of crustose lichen in the family Ectolechiaceae. It is known from subtropical Florida and has black apothecia (disk-like fruiting bodies) with margins that are often conspicuously gray and dusted with pruina, especially when young.

== Taxonomy ==
Tapellaria floridensis was described as a new species in 2011 by Ralph Common and Robert Lücking. The holotype (the specimen the name is based on; Common 7322A) was collected in April 1997 in Fakahatchee Strand Preserve State Park (Collier County, Florida), along the Scenic Drive (CR 837) near the bend near gate 14 in second-growth habitat; it is deposited in the herbarium of the Michigan State University Museum (MSC). Duplicate material is reported for the University of South Florida herbarium (USF) and Common's personal herbarium.

The specific epithet floridensis refers to the state of Florida. The species was compared especially with Tapellaria malmei, which has a similar ascospore type (shape and internal divisions) but differs in having young apothecia without pruina and larger ascospores.

== Description ==
The thallus (lichen body) is corticolous (growing on bark) and typically 1–2 cm across and about 30–50 micrometers (μm) thick. It forms a continuous crust with an uneven surface that is white to pale gray, and it contains a chlorococcoid photobiont (a green alga that provides photosynthesis).

The apothecia are sessile (sitting directly on the thallus, without a stalk) and rounded, about 0.3–0.7 mm in diameter and 170–270 μm high. The disk (the exposed spore-bearing surface) is black, concave when young, and becomes flat to slightly convex with age. The margin is thick and prominent and is typically covered with a gray pruinose layer (often strongest in younger apothecia) that may wear away with age.

Under the microscope, the excipulum (the rim tissue around the apothecium) is dark purplish brown, and the hypothecium (tissue beneath the hymenium) is also dark purplish brown; the K test is positive (K+), giving a purplish reaction. The hymenium (spore-producing layer) is about 100–120 μm high and is colorless to faintly purplish toward the top. It has branched, net-like paraphyses (anastomosing filaments), and the asci (spore sacs) are about 90–110 × 18–25 μm. The ascospores are ellipsoid and muriform (divided into many small compartments), produced 4–8 per ascus, and measure about 20–25 × 9–12 μm; no lichen substances were detected by thin-layer chromatography.

The species also produces campylidia (asexual spore-producing structures) that are sessile and hood-shaped, with a black lobe, and it forms filiform, curved conidia that are multiseptate (reported as 7–13 septa). In Tapellaria, species are mainly separated by ascospore size and septation (number and pattern of internal divisions) and by whether pruina is present on the apothecial margin; this is the main feature used to distinguish T. floridensis from similar taxa.

Tapellaria floridensis is morphologically similar to Tapellaria parvimuriformis and can be confused with it. It is separated by its white to pale grey thallus, black campylidia (gray with a whitish base in T. parvimuriformis), and longer conidia (80–90 μm rather than 45–50 μm).

== Habitat and distribution ==
Tapellaria floridensis is known from two collections from Fakahatchee Strand Preserve State Park in southwestern Florida. It was recorded growing on branches and trunks of hardwoods in second-growth habitat (regrown forest) along the park's Scenic Drive near gate 14.
