= Tapellaria granulosa =

Scientific classification
- Kingdom: Fungi
- Division: Ascomycota
- Class: Lecanoromycetes
- Order: Lecanorales
- Family: Ectolechiaceae
- Genus: Tapellaria
- Species: T. granulosa

Binomial name
- Tapellaria granulosa Lücking & Rivas Plata (2011)

Species of lichen-forming fungus

Tapellaria granulosa is a species of corticolous (bark-dwelling) crustose lichen in the family Ectolechiaceae. It was described from subtropical Florida and has a pale green thallus (lichen body) that is densely covered with fine, granule-like outgrowths. It also has black apothecia (disk-like fruiting bodies) and muriform ascospores (spores divided into many small compartments).

== Taxonomy ==
Tapellaria granulosa was described as a new species in 2011 by Robert Lücking and Eimy Rivas Plata (MycoBank no. 560012), based on a collection made in Fakahatchee Strand Preserve State Park (Collier County, Florida). The holotype (the specimen the name is based on; Lücking & Rivas Plata 26810) was collected in March 2009 along Janes Scenic Drive, about 1.8 miles (2.9 km) north-northwest of the ranger station, in a Taxodium–Sabal hammock. It is deposited in the Field Museum herbarium (F), with an isotype (a duplicate type specimen) in the University of South Florida herbarium (USF). The specific epithet granulosa refers to the finely and densely granulate thallus surface, described as unusual within the genus.

== Description ==
The thallus (lichen body) is corticolous (growing on bark) and forms a continuous crust 2–5 cm across and about 30–50 micrometers (μm) thick. Its surface is pale green and densely granulose, giving it an isidia-like ("isidiate") appearance. The granules are described as clusters of photobiont cells wrapped in fungal hyphee; the photobiont is chlorococcoid (a green alga). The apothecia are sessile (sitting directly on the thallus), rounded to irregular, and 0.5–1 mm in diameter (180–270 μm high). The disk is initially flat but becomes convex with age; it is black to brownish black, with a thin, persistent black margin. Under the microscope, the paraphyses are branched and anastomosing (net-like). The asci (spore sacs) measure about 90–120 × 18–28 μm and contain 4–8 ellipsoid, muriform ascospores. The spores measure about 20–25 × 10–15 μm and have 3–5 transverse septa and 1–2 longitudinal septa per segment. Campylidia (asexual spore-producing structures) are also present (0.4–0.6 mm broad and 0.7–1 mm long). They produce filiform (thread-like), curved conidia (asexual spores) that are 5–7-septate and about 40–50 × 2 μm. No lichen substances were detected by thin-layer chromatography.

== Habitat and distribution ==
The species was originally known from two collections from Fakahatchee Strand Preserve State Park, where it grows on the bark of Taxodium. It was treated as closely related to Tapellaria malmei from the same locality, sharing similarly small muriform ascospores (4–8 per ascus) but differing in its distinctive granular thallus. The granules were interpreted as unlikely to function as true isidia and may instead increase thallus surface area. Similar between-species variation in thallus texture has been compared with patterns reported in the related genus Lasioloma. Tapellaria granulosa has also been documented from Santa Cruz Island in the Galápagos.
