= Roccellinastrum flavescens =

Scientific classification
- Kingdom: Fungi
- Division: Ascomycota
- Class: Lecanoromycetes
- Order: Lecanorales
- Family: Ectolechiaceae
- Genus: Roccellinastrum
- Species: R. flavescens

Binomial name
- Roccellinastrum flavescens Kantvilas (1990)

Species of lichen-forming fungus

Roccellinastrum flavescens is a rare species of fruticose lichen in the family Ectolechiaceae. It is found only in the Walls of Jerusalem National Park in Tasmania, Australia. This pale yellow, shrub-like lichen grows exclusively on the twigs of pencil pine (Athrotaxis cupressoides), a rare Tasmanian conifer. Described by Australian scientist Gintaras Kantvilas in 1990, it can be distinguished from related lichens by its unique chemistry, including traces of usnic acid, and its cottony texture that forms patches up to 1 centimetre across. The species is threatened by the vulnerability of its host tree to bushfire and was listed as endangered under Tasmanian law in 2005.

== Taxonomy ==
Roccellinastrum flavescens was formally introduced as a new species in 1990 by the Australian lichenologist Gintaras Kantvilas. The species epithet flavescens refers to its pale yellow colour. This species is unique within its genus due to its specific chemical composition, including the presence of trace amounts of usnic acid, which had not been previously recorded in Roccellinastrum species. It is found exclusively in association with Athrotaxis cupressoides, an endemic Tasmanian conifer, in a restricted alpine within the Walls of Jerusalem National Park.

== Description ==
Roccellinastrum flavescens forms a cottony, fruticose (shrub-like) thallus that is pale yellow in colour. Its surface is somewhat granular, and the thallus can grow up to 1 cm across. The lichen is composed of short, irregular lobes that coalesce, meaning they fuse together, and these lobes are typically 0.4 to 2.5 mm wide. The upper surface of the thallus is smooth and may have a shiny or slightly frosted appearance. The fungal filaments, the hyphae, are thick-walled and form the structural body of the lichen. The lichen partners with green algae that provide photosynthetic energy, and these algal cells are round, measuring 6 to 10 μm in diameter.

The apothecia (fruiting bodies) are small, convex to almost spherical, and can be between 0.4 and 1.2 mm in diameter. They are pale cream to pinkish in colour and often form compound structures where multiple apothecia merge. The spore-bearing part of the apothecia, the hymenium, is colourless, while the upper layer, the epithecium, is pale yellow-brown. The asci (spore-producing sacs) are cylindrical to club-shaped and contain eight simple, spherical ascospores that are 2.5 to 5 μm in diameter. Pycnidia, which produce asexual spores, are abundant on the thallus surface and are globose in shape, measuring 60 to 100 μm in diameter. The conidia (asexual spores) are ellipsoid, measuring 3 to 4.5 μm in length.

Chemically, the lichen contains protocetraric acid as the major secondary metabolite, with trace amounts of usnic acid and virensic acid. The thallus reacts positively to a chemical spot test (PD+) by turning red.

== Habitat and distribution ==
Roccellinastrum flavescens is known only from Tasmania, where it grows on the living and dead twigs of Athrotaxis cupressoides, a fire-sensitive conifer endemic to the region. This species has been recorded exclusively within the high-elevation forests of the Walls of Jerusalem National Park, located in Tasmania's Central Highlands. This area is of significant phytogeographic interest due to its extensive alpine environment, much of which lies above 1200 metres. Outside of this park, Athrotaxis cupressoides has largely been reduced to small stands or isolated trees due to its vulnerability to fire. Searches in other areas of Tasmania have not found Roccellinastrum flavescens, suggesting that this lichen may be restricted to these unique montane forests.

Roccellinastrum flavescens coexists with other lichen species typically found in open montane forests, such as species of Usnea and Menegazzia, and Hypogymnia lugubris and H. turgidula. However, unlike these lichens, which tend to develop fully on older leafless twigs, R. flavescens prefers the youngest shoots that still retain living leaves, indicating a particular ecological niche. The distinct yellow hue and cottony structure of R. flavescens make it readily identifiable within the Tasmanian lichen flora, and it is unlikely to be confused with other species in the region. In 2005, R. flavescens was later included in the Threatened Species Protection Act 1995 as an endangered species.
