= Byssoloma brunneodiscum =

Scientific classification
- Kingdom: Fungi
- Division: Ascomycota
- Class: Lecanoromycetes
- Order: Lecanorales
- Family: Ectolechiaceae
- Genus: Byssoloma
- Species: B. brunneodiscum

Binomial name
- Byssoloma brunneodiscum W.C.Wang & J.C.Wei (2020)

Species of lichen

Byssoloma brunneodiscum is a species of foliicolous (leaf-dwelling) lichen in the family Ectolechiaceae. Described in 2020 from specimens collected on Hainan Island, China, this lichen forms smooth, dull-green films on living leaves in montane rainforest understorys. It is distinguished by its brown to dark-brown fruiting discs surrounded by thick white margins and its production of a chlorinated xanthone compound in its tissues.

== Taxonomy ==
Byssoloma brunneodiscum is a foliicolous member of the family Ectolechiaceae that was described in 2020 by Wei-Cheng Wang and Jiang-Chun Wei. Molecular analysis of mitochondrial small-subunit rDNA places it, together with B. annuum, B. melanodiscocarpum and B. rubrofuscum, in the well-supported B. subundulatum clade within Byssoloma. The holotype was collected by Wang on 6 September 2017 from Jianfeng Ridge, (Ledong County, Hainan), at 960 m elevation. The specific epithet brunneodiscum refers to the brown discs that are characteristic of the apothecia of this species.

== Description ==
The thallus forms a smooth, continuous, dull-green film on living leaves and lacks a distinct marginal hypothallus. Algal cells are chlorococcoid, 5–7.5 μm in diameter. Apothecia are sessile, 0.3–0.5 mm wide, with a plane brown to dark-brown disc that is encircled by a thick, persistent white byssoid margin. Beneath the disc, the excipulum and basal tissue consist of loosely interwoven colourless hyphae studded with crystals that dissolve potassium hydroxide solution (KOH) to produce a positive pink reaction; the hypothecium is pale brown and measures 25–30 μm high. The hymenium reaches 40–50 μm tall; asci are 8-spored and amyloid, while the ellipsoid, colourless ascospores have three transverse septa and measure 11–14 × 3–4 μm.

Asexual propagation occurs through sessile, wart-like pycnidia (10–13 μm across) that release non-septate, pear-shaped conidia 2–2.5 × 1.5 μm. Thin-layer chromatography detects the chlorinated xanthone compound 2,5,7-trichloro-3-O-methylnorlichexanthone in the thallus.

== Habitat and distribution ==
The species is known only from montane rainforest on Hainan Island, China, where it grows sparsely on smooth leaf surfaces in the damp, shaded understory at around 960 m elevation.
