= Sporopodium awasthianum =

Scientific classification
- Kingdom: Fungi
- Division: Ascomycota
- Class: Lecanoromycetes
- Order: Lecanorales
- Family: Ectolechiaceae
- Genus: Sporopodium
- Species: S. awasthianum

Binomial name
- Sporopodium awasthianum Kr.P.Singh & Pinokiyo (2008)

Species of lichen-forming fungus

Sporopodium awasthianum is a species of foliicolous (leaf-dwelling) lichen in the family Ectolechiaceae. Found in India, it was formally described as a new species in 2008 by Krishna Pal Singh and Athokpam Pinokiyo. The type specimen was collected by the first author in the Tengapani Reserve Forest (Lohit district, Arunachal Pradesh) at an altitude of 250 m (820 ft), where it was found growing on dicotyledon leaves. The lichen has a finely verrucose (warty) thallus with whitish-pale to greyish green or brownish verrucae, a white hypothallus (when present), and colourless, muriform (chambered) ascospores that measure 50–85 by 15–20 μm. The specific epithet awasthianum honours Indian lichenologist Dharani Dhar Awasthi, who, according to the authors, "has made valuable contributions to Indian lichenology, and who is still continuing his efforts towards the development of lichenology in India".
