= Sporopodium soredioflavescens =

Scientific classification
- Kingdom: Fungi
- Division: Ascomycota
- Class: Lecanoromycetes
- Order: Lecanorales
- Family: Ectolechiaceae
- Genus: Sporopodium
- Species: S. soredioflavescens

Binomial name
- Sporopodium soredioflavescens Aptroot (2022)

Species of lichen-forming fungus

Sporopodium soredioflavescens is a foliicolous (leaf-dwelling) lichen in the family Ectolechiaceae. It forms a thin, pale greenish film on living leaves in primary rainforest in central Brazil. It is the first known member of its genus to produce soredia (powdery asexual propagules), which spread across the leaf surface. It was formally described in 2022 from material collected in the Reserva Cristalino region of Mato Grosso and has since been recorded in São Paulo State.

== Taxonomy ==
Sporopodium soredioflavescens was described in 2022 by André Aptroot from material collected on living leaves in primary rainforest in the Reserva Cristalino (Mato Grosso, Brazil) at an elevation of 250–350 m (820–1,150 ft). The holotype (A. Aptroot 83231) is deposited in the herbarium of the Federal University of Mato Grosso do Sul (CGMS). Within Sporopodium, the species was considered most similar to S. aeruginascens but differs in having a thallus with soredia and well-developed soralia. At the time of description, soralia had not been reported in any other known species of the genus, and the combination of a leaf-dwelling habit and a sorediate thallus supported recognition of S. soredioflavescens as a distinct species.

== Description ==
The thallus of Sporopodium soredioflavescens is crustose (crust-like), continuous, and dull, forming a pale greenish film up to about 4 cm (1.6 in) across and under 0.1 mm thick; it lacks a cortex (a distinct outer layer). The surface has even paler, hemispherical warts about 0.05 mm wide, spaced roughly 0.1 mm apart, and lacks a distinct prothallus (a border of fungal tissue). The thallus bears soralia (patches that produce soredia), mostly towards the thallus margin. The soredia form a powdery (farinose) layer that is slightly darker green than the surrounding thallus and lies on the surface. The photobiont (algal partner) is trentepohlioid (Trentepohlia-type). Sexual fruiting bodies (ascomata) have not been observed. Campylidia are present and stain blue with iodine (IKI+). They are 0.2–0.3 mm in diameter and up to 0.3 mm high, strongly concave, deep yellow inside and pale yellow outside, and attached to the thallus by a white hyphal base. Asexual spores (conidia) have not been observed. All standard spot tests were negative (UV−, C−, P− and K−). Thin-layer chromatography was not performed because too little material was available. The yellow pigment was inferred to be a xanthone based on its colour and comparison with other Sporopodium species.

== Habitat and distribution ==
Sporopodium soredioflavescens grows on living leaves in primary rain forest in the Reserva Cristalino region of Mato Grosso, Brazil, at elevations between about 250 and 350 m (820 and 1,150 ft). When it was described in 2022, it had not been reported from outside Brazil. Later records extended its known range to São Paulo state.
