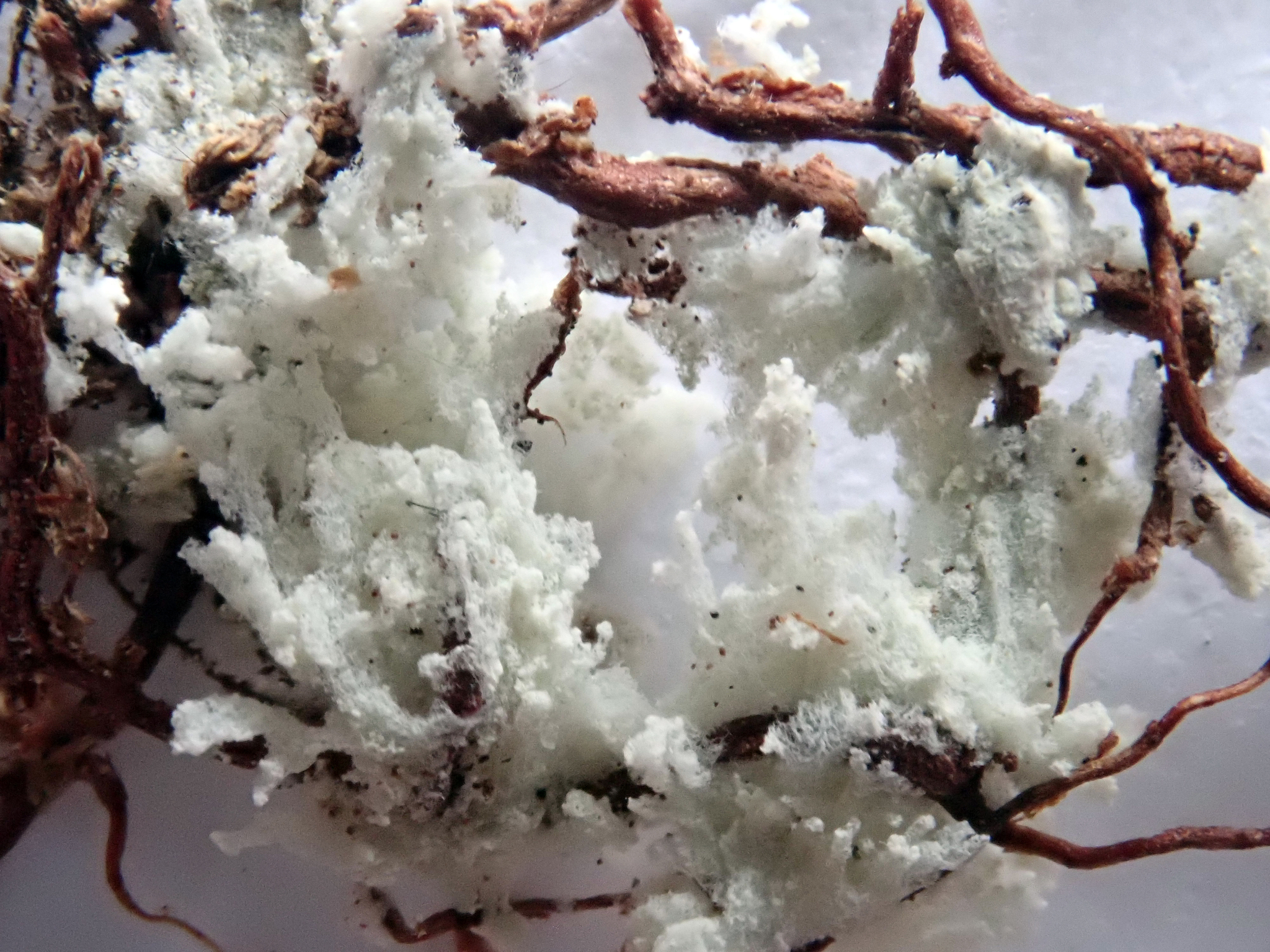
- Specimen of Roccellinastrum neglectum, collected in New Zealand

Scientific classification
- Kingdom: Fungi
- Division: Ascomycota
- Class: Lecanoromycetes
- Order: Lecanorales
- Family: Ectolechiaceae
- Genus: Roccellinastrum; Follmann (1968)

Type species
- Roccellinastrum spongoideum Follmann (1968)

Species
- R. candidum R. epiphyllum R. flavescens R. lagarostrobi R. leprocauloides R. neglectum R. spongoideum

= Roccellinastrum =

Genus of lichen-forming fungi

Roccellinastrum is a genus of lichen-forming fungi in the family Ectolechiaceae. It has seven species.

== Taxonomy ==
The genus was circumscribed in 1968 by the German lichenologist Gerhard Follman, with Roccellinastrum spongoideum assigned as the type species. This byssoid lichen (appearing wispy, like teased wool) was found growing on cactus spines in the fog oases of western Chile. Follman classified the genus in the family Chrysothricaceae, as he emphasized the taxonomic importance of the byssoid thallus, and the similarity of the apothecium and ascus structure to those in that family. In 1983, Aino Henssen and colleagues emended the genus and placed it in the family Lecideaceae.

== Description ==
Species in genus Roccellinastrum are characterized by apothecia of diverse shape that lack a proper margin, and a developmental morphology corresponding to that of the order Lecanorales. They have small, amyloid asci containing eight spores, and branched paraphyses and excipular hyphae. Their wispy (byssoid) to spongy (spongiose) thallus is made of thick–walled hyphae. The phycobiont partners are green algae of the order Chlorococcales. The main secondary chemical produced by Roccellinastrum lichens is protocetraric acid. Other compounds, such as atranorin or squamatic acid, may also be present.

== Species ==
- Roccellinastrum candidum (Müll.Arg.) Henssen (1982)
- Roccellinastrum epiphyllum Henssen & Vobis (1982)
- Roccellinastrum flavescens Kantvilas (1990) – Tasmania
- Roccellinastrum lagarostrobi Kantvilas (1990) – Tasmania
- Roccellinastrum leprocauloides Kalb & Aptroot (2018) – Queensland, Australia
- Roccellinastrum neglectum Henssen & Vobis (1982)
- Roccellinastrum spongoideum Follmann (1968)
