= Asterothyrium vezdae =

Scientific classification
- Kingdom: Fungi
- Division: Ascomycota
- Class: Lecanoromycetes
- Order: Graphidales
- Family: Gomphillaceae
- Genus: Asterothyrium
- Species: A. vezdae

Binomial name
- Asterothyrium vezdae Flakus & Lücking (2008)

Species of lichen

Asterothyrium vezdae is a species of foliicolous (leaf-dwelling) lichen in the family Gomphillaceae. It is found in Bolivia, where it grows on the leaves of vascular plants in the Amazon rainforest. The lichen is distinguished from its closest relative, Asterothyrium octomerum, by the larger number of septa in its ascospores, and its and black apothecia.

== Taxonomy ==
Asterothyrium vezdae was described as a new species in 2008 by Adam Flakus and Robert Lücking. The type specimen was collected by the first author in Nuevos Reyes village (José Ballivián Province, Beni Department) at an altitude of 190 m (620 ft). The species epithet honours Czech lichenologist Antonín Vězda, "for his numerous and significant contributions to the study of foliicolous lichens world-wide".

== Description ==
The thallus of Asterothyrium vezdae is epiphyllous (growing on the upper leaf surface), forming rounded to irregular patches that are 1–2 mm in diameter, with a thickness of 20–30 μm. The entire thallus can measure 3–5 mm across and has a smooth, white corticate surface comprising colourless, rectangular cells. Its photobiont is chlorococcoid.

The apothecia are typically single on each thallus patch, and zeorine in form but with a carbonized outer margin. They are rounded and measure 0.3–0.6 mm in diameter and 100–180 μm in height. The disc is plane, with a yellow-brown to dark brown colour, while the margin is thick, strongly prominent, and divided into irregular lobes. The excipulum is paraplectenchymatous, and the hypothecium is colourless to pale brown. The hymenium is colorless, while the epithecium is yellow-brown. Asci have an ellipsoid to ovoid shape, while ascospores are oblong to vermiform, and have from 7 to 15 septa with slight constrictions at the septa. A. vezdae the first species in genus Asterothyrium known to have up to 15-septate spores. Pycnidia are marginal and conical, with a triangular base, while conidia are oblong-ellipsoid and lack septa.

Asterothyrium octomerum, found in tropical Africa, has spores similar to A. vezdae, but these spores only contain 7 septa that do not have constrictions. Additionally, A. octomerum has brownish-grey, rather than black apothecia.

== Habitat and distribution ==
At the time of publication, Asterothyrium vezdae was known only from the type locality in the lowland southwest Amazon forest of Bolivia, where it was found growing on the leaves of a vascular plant. The chemical composition of this species has not been tested.
