= Baflavia =

Scientific classification
- Kingdom: Fungi
- Division: Ascomycota
- Class: Lecanoromycetes
- Order: Lecanorales
- Family: Ectolechiaceae
- Genus: Baflavia; Lücking (2008)
- Species: B. flavescens

Binomial name
- Baflavia flavescens (Lücking) Lücking (2008)

Monotypic genus of lichens

Baflavia is a monotypic genus of lichens in the family Ectolechiaceae. Circumscribed by Robert Lücking in 2008, it contains the single species Baflavia flavescens. This foliicolous lichen is found in tropical America, with the type specimen collected in Costa Rica.

== Systematics ==
When he first described the species in 1999, Lücking assigned it to the genus Barubria. However, he later reconsidered, as its appearance is distinctly different from that of other members of that genus. In 2008, he chose instead to circumscribe the monotypic genus Baflavia for it.
