= Sporopodium =

Scientific classification
- Kingdom: Fungi
- Division: Ascomycota
- Class: Lecanoromycetes
- Order: Lecanorales
- Family: Ectolechiaceae
- Genus: Sporopodium; Mont. (1851)

Type species
- Sporopodium leprieurii Mont. (1851)

Synonyms
- Acleistomyces Bat. (1961); Ectolechia Trevis. (1852)

Genus of lichen-forming fungi

Sporopodium is a genus of lichen-forming fungi in the family Ectolechiaceae. Most Sporopodium species grow on living leaves (they are foliicolous) in tropical forests worldwide, though some also occur on twigs or bark. The genus is known for producing campylidia, small hood-like outgrowths that produce conidia (asexual spores) and help the lichen disperse to new surfaces. Species in the genus produce a wide variety of chemical compounds, including yellow and orange pigments that can help identify individual species. The genus was established in 1851 with the description of a first species from tropical leaves collected in French Guiana.

== Taxonomy ==
Camille Montagne established Sporopodium in 1851 when he described the foliicolous (leaf-dwelling) species Sporopodium leprieurii from leathery tropical leaves in French Guiana. The genus was defined by three features: apothecia without a proper exciple (a distinct rim); a vesiculose hypothecium (a bubble-like layer beneath the spore-bearing tissue); and an unusual spore development in which a single, many-celled spore becomes exposed on a long stalk as the ascus breaks down (hence the name "spore-foot"). The thallus was described as very thin, green-glaucous (blue-green), and granular, with small, dark apothecia whose margin becomes indistinct with age (immarginate). The asci were described as club-shaped and apparently lacking paraphyses, with each ascus producing a single muriform spore (divided into many chambers) that becomes stalked (pedicellate) and pale olive at maturity. The thallus was compared with Fée's Echinoplaca, but the fruiting structures were treated as distinct.

In more modern classifications, Sporopodium was placed in an expanded Pilocarpaceae that brings together several mainly leaf-dwelling lineages. Vězda reinstated Pilocarpaceae (since synonymized with Ectolechiaceae) to accommodate genera such as Byssoloma, Fellhanera and Byssolecania. Later treatments expanded the family to include the campylidia-bearing taxa previously placed in Ectolechiaceae, with Sporopodium among the central genera. Later DNA-based analyses of mitochondrial small-subunit rDNA supported this expanded circumscription and suggested that Micareaceae is part of the same larger clade (evolutionary group). Relationships among the included genera, however, remain uncertain.

== Description ==
Sporopodium forms a continuous, relatively thick thallus (lichen body) that is pale in colour and dull in texture. The surface is often finely powdery and, in some species, has scattered small warts. The apothecia (sexual fruiting bodies) are biatorine in form (having a distinct proper margin) and vary from pale to dark in colour. Their exciple—the rim tissue surrounding the disc—is paraplectenchymatous (made of compact, brick-like cells) and may contain crystals or be crystal-free. The paraphyses (filamentous cells among the asci) are richly branched and anastomosing (forming an interconnected network). The asci are surrounded by a gelatinous sheath that stains blue with iodine (J+). They have a distinctly blue-staining tholus (apical dome) with a broad ocular chamber at the top. Each ascus usually contains a single muriform ascospore (divided by both transverse and longitudinal septa), although one species has eight spores per ascus. Small algal cells are sometimes embedded in the epithecium (uppermost layer above the hymenium).

The campylidia (specialised asexual reproductive structures) are pale and usually the same colour as the thallus; in species with yellow apothecia or margins, the campylidia are also distinctly yellow. Structurally, each campylidium forms a small hood over a cavity where conidia develop; the opening leads onto a small platform that is partly covered by a lobe. The conidia are ellipsoid to broadly club-shaped and are usually non-septate (without internal cross-walls); one species has 1-septate conidia. In some species, algal (photobiont) cells occur within the conidiogenous layer, as well as in the epithecium.

=== Chemistry ===
Chemical analyses show that Sporopodium species produce a broad range of secondary metabolites (lichen products). Reported compounds include many xanthones (often chlorinated), as well as depsides and depsidones such as pannarin and atranorin. Some species also contain zeorin and pigments related to vulpinic acid, and some contain usnic and isousnic acid. In Sporopodium isidiatum, HPLC and HPTLC analyses detected 2,7-dichlorolichexanthone and zeorin as major substances, with several additional compounds in smaller amounts. This particular pair of major substances was not reported from the other species compared.

== Habitat and distribution ==
Most Sporopodium species grow on living leaves (they are foliicolous), but many also occur on twigs, and a small number are known only from bark. The genus is largely pantropical in distribution, with species reported from multiple tropical regions worldwide. Some species appear widespread across the tropics, while others are confined to particular regions (for example, the tropical Americas (Neotropics), parts of the eastern Paleotropics, or tropical Asia and the Pacific).

== Species ==
- Sporopodium aeruginascens Lücking & Lumbsch (2001)
- Sporopodium aurantiacum (Müll.Arg.) Lücking (1999)
- Sporopodium awasthianum Kr.P.Singh & Pinokiyo (2008) – India
- Sporopodium citrinum (Zahlbr.) Elix, Lumbsch & Lücking (1995)
- Sporopodium flavescens (R.Sant.) Vězda (1988)
- Sporopodium isidiatum Sérus. & Lücking (2008) – Papua New Guinea; Sri Lanka
- Sporopodium leprieurii Mont. (1851)
- Sporopodium leprosum Øvstedal & Elix (2007)
- Sporopodium marginatum Lücking & Lumbsch (2008)
- Sporopodium phyllocharis (Mont.) A.Massal. (1853)
- Sporopodium pilocarpoides (Zahlbr.) Lücking & Kalb (2002)
- Sporopodium podosphaera Lücking & R.Sant. (2002)
- Sporopodium soredioflavescens Aptroot (2022) – Brazil
- Sporopodium subflavescens Lücking & Lumbsch (2008)
- Sporopodium xantholeucum (Müll.Arg.) Zahlbr. (1924)
