= Pseudocalopadia =

Scientific classification
- Kingdom: Fungi
- Division: Ascomycota
- Class: Lecanoromycetes
- Order: Lecanorales
- Family: Ectolechiaceae
- Genus: Pseudocalopadia; Lücking (1999)

Type species
- Pseudocalopadia mira Lücking (1999)

Species
- P. chibaensis P. mira

Genus of lichen-forming fungi

Pseudocalopadia is a genus of lichen-forming fungi in the family Ectolechiaceae. The genus was circumscribed in 1999 by the lichenologist Robert Lücking, with Pseudocalopadia mira as the type, and at the time, only species. P. chibaensis was added to the genus in 2017.
