= Podotara =

Scientific classification
- Kingdom: Fungi
- Division: Ascomycota
- Class: Lecanoromycetes
- Order: Lecanorales
- Family: Ectolechiaceae
- Genus: Podotara; Malcolm & Vězda (1996)
- Species: P. pilophoriformis

Binomial name
- Podotara pilophoriformis Malcolm & Vězda (1996)

Single-species fungal genus

Podotara is a fungal genus in the family Ectolechiaceae. It is a monotypic genus, containing the single species Podotara pilophoriformis, an uncommon foliicolous (leaf-dwelling), crustose lichen that grows on Podocarpus totara, a species of podocarp tree endemic to New Zealand. Both the genus and the species were proposed in 1996.

== Taxonomy ==
Podotara was first defined and described by William Malcolm and Antonín Vězda, stemming from the discovery of an unusual crustose lichen exhibiting spherical, stalked apothecia found growing on the leaves of an endemic podocarp in New Zealand. The new genus and its single species, named Podotara pilophoriformis, could not be categorised under any known genus or family, thereby highlighting its uncertain affinity. The genus name, Podotara, is a fusion of parts of the name Podocarpus totara, the Latin binomial of the plant on which the holotype of the species was found. The specific epithet, pilophoriformis, was chosen due to the perceived resemblance between the stalked apothecia of the new species and those distinctive to Pilophorus.

While Podotara pilophoriformis shares superficial similarities with a number of known lichen genera, no definitive association can be made. Despite the resemblance of its pale, spherical, orange-pink, stalked apothecia to those of Baeomyces, the amyloid apical dome and darker blue tube structure of its asci firmly rule out any such correlation. Although the iodine potassium-iodide (IKI) starch-staining reaction of its ascus apex suggests similarity with Porpidia or Mycobilimbia, the presence of stalked apothecia and the absence of an ornamented perispore in its ascospores set it apart. The irregularly thickened septa of its young ascospores may be similar to the plurilocular ascospores of Caloplaca, but the new species does not possess any trace of the substance parietin characteristic of that genus. Its resemblance to Pilophorus is also superficial, as it lacks the cephalodia, black apothecia, Porpidia-type asci, simple ascospores, and the atranorin content of that genus. Based on these distinct attributes and discrepancies, the authors reasoned that this uncommon foliicolous lichen was most suitably categorised within its own genus, Podotara.

== Description ==
The thallus of Podotara pilophoriformis is crustose, appearing as isolated patches, with a diameter range of 0.3 to 0.5 mm. The mature thallus displays a cracked-areolate texture, with individual areolae measuring between 0.3 and 0.5 mm in width. Characteristically, the thallus exhibits a white hue, around 0.1 mm in thickness, incorporating green algal cells belonging to the genus Trebouxia. A unique feature of Podotara pilophoriformis is the absence of prothallus.

The apothecia, round and sometimes formed by a fusion of two or more tubercles, have a rosy colour and measure between 0.3 and 0.35 mm across. They stand on a white stalk, ranging from 0.2 to 0.4 mm in length and 0.1 mm in width. Inside, the hymenium is clear, around 70 μm tall, with straight paraphyses that partly intertwine and measure 1.5 μm in thickness. The ellipsoid ascospores are four-loculed, ranging in size from 12 to 15 μm by 2.5 to 3 μm.

The chemistry of Podotara pilophoriformi is also distinctive. The thallus reacts to a solution of potassium hydroxide (KOH, a standard chemical spot test) by turning red. It contains norstictic acid, connorstictic acid, salazinic acid, and galbinic acid. Additionally, the hymenial jelly surrounding the ascus turns blue when in contact with iodine (I), with a darker blue tube structure also evident. The apothecia, similar to the thallus, react to KOH with a red colour.

== Habitat and distribution ==
The habitat of Podotara pilophoriformis is highly specialised, with the species growing epiphyllously (i.e., on the upper surface) on the leaves of Podocarpus totara, a native podocarp in New Zealand. The type specimen was collected on Pakawau Creek Road (Golden Bay, South Island). Some other lichens that typically grow in association with P. pilophoriformis include Bactrospora metabola, Bacidia sp., Lecanora sp., Megalaria grossa, and Rinodina malcolmii.
