= Tapellariopsis =

Scientific classification
- Kingdom: Fungi
- Division: Ascomycota
- Class: Lecanoromycetes
- Order: Lecanorales
- Family: Ectolechiaceae
- Genus: Tapellariopsis; Lücking (1999)
- Species: T. octomera

Binomial name
- Tapellariopsis octomera Lücking (1999)

Single-species fungal genus

Tapellariopsis is a genus of lichenized fungi in the family Ectolechiaceae. This is a monotypic genus, containing the single species Tapellariopsis octomera. Both the genus and species were described as new in 1999 by the lichenologist Robert Lücking.
