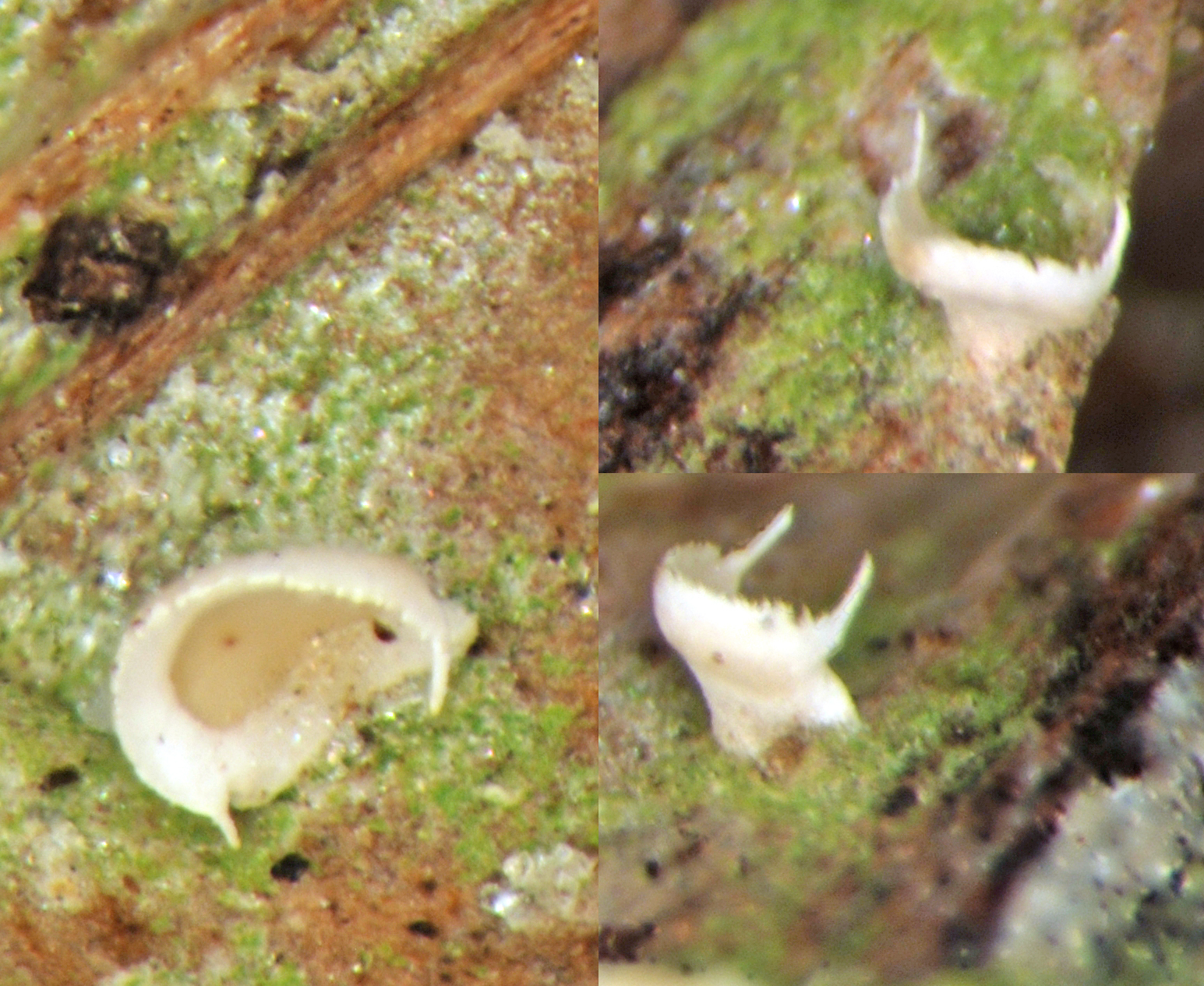
- Campylidia (helmet-shaped conidioma) of Badimiella pteridophila

Scientific classification
- Kingdom: Fungi
- Division: Ascomycota
- Class: Lecanoromycetes
- Order: Lecanorales
- Family: Ectolechiaceae
- Genus: Badimiella; Malcolm & Vězda (1994)

Type species
- Badimiella serusiauxii Malcolm & Vězda (1994)

Species
- B. pteridophila B. serusiauxii

= Badimiella =

Genus of lichen-forming fungi

Badimiella is a genus of lichen-forming fungi in the family Ectolechiaceae. It has two species of foliicolous (leaf-dwelling) lichens.

== Taxonomy ==
The genus was circumscribed in 1994 by lichenologists William McLagan Malcolm and Antonín Vězda. The genus name refers to the superficial resemblance of the apothecia to those to genus Badimia. Initially a monotypic genus, another species was transferred to Badimiella (from Cyphella) in 2001.

== Description ==
Badimiella lichens grow as a thin layer on the surface of plants. The apothecia, or fruiting bodies, of this genus are somewhat biatorine in nature, meaning they have a soft, light-coloured (not blackened) margin. These are sessile (attached directly without a stalk) and are tightly constricted at their base. The excipulum is made up of paraplectenchymatous tissue which appear clear or hyaline. This layer contains a lot of crystals which can dissolve when treated with a solution of potassium hydroxide. The epithecium, another layer atop the apothecium, is free from algae, granules or crystals.

Both the hypothecium (supporting layer beneath the hymenium) and the hymenium (fertile layer where spore development takes place) are clear in colour. The paraphyses, structures found within the hymenium, are mostly simple with few branches, and their tips are slightly swollen and clear.

The asci (sac-like structures) of Badimiella are of the Byssoloma-type and can range from club-shaped to cylinder-club shaped. They usually contain eight spores. The ascospores are generally narrow and ellipse-shaped with cross-walls. Rarely, they might also have a longitudinal division. These spores lack a distinct halo around them.

Conidiomata, the asexual fruiting bodies of this lichen, are campylidia-like in nature (a helmet-shaped structure found in some genera of foliicolous lichens). They stand upright, are membranous even when soaked, and do not contain algae. Initially, they resemble a helmet shape but open up as they mature. The inside layer of these structures is concave. The campylospores (asexual spores) can vary from ellipse-shaped to rod-shaped, are split into two by a septum, and are clear.

== Species ==
- Badimiella pteridophila (Sacc.) Garn.-Jones & Malcolm (2001)
- Badimiella serusiauxii Malcolm & Vězda (1994)
