= Aquacidia =

Scientific classification
- Kingdom: Fungi
- Division: Ascomycota
- Class: Lecanoromycetes
- Order: Lecanorales
- Family: Ectolechiaceae
- Genus: Aquacidia; Aptroot (2018)

Type species
- Aquacidia trachona (Ach.) Aptroot (2018)

Species
- A. antricola A. trachona A. viridifarinosa

Genus of lichen-forming fungi

Aquacidia is a genus of lichen-forming fungi in the family Ectolechiaceae. It has three species, which occur in Europe and North America. Lichens in this genus can form thalli that cover vast areas of substrate. For example, in Holland, the lichens can form large colonies in sheltered rock crevices between boulders in dikes.

== Taxonomy ==
The genus was circumscribed in 2018 by André Aptroot to house three temperate species that molecular data showed were misplaced in Bacidia (family Ramalinaceae). The type species is Aquacidia trachona, a lichen that was originally described in 1803 by Erik Acharius as Verrucaria trachona. The generic name Aquacidia alludes to the typical ecology of its species, which grows on rocks close to rivers or lakes and often form extensive colonies in damp crevices on dykes and other riparian structures.

An analysis of mitochondrial small-subunit (mtSSU) ribosomal DNA revealed that these taxa form a separate, well-supported lineage within the family Ectolechiaceae and are not closely related to the type species of that genus, B. rosella. Diagnostic characters that separate Aquacidia from morphologically similar Ectolechiaceaen genera include branched paraphyses that widen into elongated, clavate tips; bacillar, hyaline ascospores with 0–5 transverse septa; and relatively large pycnidia with gaping ostioles. Chemically, the genus is distinctive in always producing xanthones or anthraquinones, metabolites absent from the look-alike genus Fellhanera.

== Description ==
Aquacidia forms extensive crusts that can carpet large areas of rock or bark. The thallus is thin and either rimose (cracked into irregular polygons) or granular-leprose, giving it a flour-dust appearance. Because it lacks a cortex, the surface feels friable and exposes the pale-green photobiont cells, which are simple, spherical algae less than 10 micrometres across.

Fruiting bodies are lecideine apothecia—small, flat discs edged by their own persistent margin rather than by thallus tissue. The margin is built of delicate, thin-walled branching hyphae, while the internal tissue (hamathecium) comprises paraphyses that branch and fuse and end in swollen, club-shaped tips. Asci are of the Micarea type and house eight colourless, cylindrical ascospores that are divided by three to five transverse walls (septa). Asexual reproduction is common: relatively large, conspicuous pycnidia pierce the surface, their wide openings rimmed by fringe-like hyphae. These structures release cylindrical conidia, often with two oil droplets or a slight waist at mid-length. Chemical tests reveal either xanthones (thallus UV+ pink) or argopsin (thallus Pd+ red); apothecia and pycnidia may also contain anthraquinones, which react K + purple.

== Habitat and distribution ==
All species of Aquacidia are temperate in distribution, and have been recorded from Europe and North America. They colonise a range of substrates—including rock, soil, bark and exposed roots—but invariably in damp situations close to rivers or lakes, often in shaded, wooded valleys. In the Netherlands, for instance, they are frequent on sheltered blocks of brick, granite or basalt that form old sea- and river-dikes; the lichens spread through deep crevices between the boulders and two or even three species may occur side-by-side on the same face.

== Species ==
- Aquacidia antricola (Hulting) Aptroot (2018)
- Aquacidia trachona (Ach.) Aptroot (2018)
- Aquacidia viridifarinosa (Coppins & P.James) Aptroot (2018)
