= Loflammiopsis =

Scientific classification
- Kingdom: Fungi
- Division: Ascomycota
- Class: Lecanoromycetes
- Order: Lecanorales
- Family: Ectolechiaceae
- Genus: Loflammiopsis; Lücking & Kalb (2000)
- Species: L. brasiliensis

Binomial name
- Loflammiopsis brasiliensis Lücking & Kalb (2000)

Single-species fungal genus

Loflammiopsis is a fungal genus in the family Ectolechiaceae. It is a monotypic genus, containing the single species Loflammiopsis brasiliensis, a lichen. The genus and species were described in 2000 by the lichenologists Robert Lücking and Klaus Kalb.
