= Septotrapelia =

Scientific classification
- Kingdom: Fungi
- Division: Ascomycota
- Class: Lecanoromycetes
- Order: Lecanorales
- Family: Ectolechiaceae
- Genus: Septotrapelia; Aptroot & Chaves (2007)

Type species
- Septotrapelia glauca Aptroot & Chaves (2007)

Species
- S. glauca S. multiseptata S. triseptata S. usnica

Synonyms
- Nelsenium Lendemer & B.P.Hodk. (2013)

Genus of lichen-forming fungi

Septotrapelia is a genus of lichen-forming fungi in the family Ectolechiaceae. It comprises four species. Species in this genus form tiny, scale-like crusts on rocks and are distinguished by their chocolate-brown fruiting discs with pale margins and unusually large ascospores divided into three segments. These small, bluish-grey lichens grow primarily on volcanic boulders and weathered stone in tropical and subtropical regions, from Costa Rica and the Galápagos to Thailand and South Korea. The genus was established in 2007 after DNA studies showed that certain species with this distinctive spore structure did not fit into existing lichen groups.

== Taxonomy ==
Septotrapelia was introduced in 2006 by André Aptroot and José Luis Chaves as part of a study describing several new squamulose lichen-forming fungal genera; unlike the ramalinaceous novelties in that paper, Septotrapelia was placed in the Pilocarpaceae (this family has been since synonymized with Ectolechiaceae). The type species, S. glauca, was described from specimens collected from volcanic boulders in pasture near Tenorio Volcano National Park, Guanacaste, Costa Rica (about 700 m elevation); the holotype is housed at the Instituto Nacional de Biodiversidad (INB).

Aptroot and Chaves separated the genus from superficially similar Trapelia and Trapeliopsis on combined characters: a dull bluish, squamulose thallus; biatorine apothecia; and large, clavate, 3-septate ascospores. They noted that no existing pilocarpaceous genus combined a squamulose thallus with 3-septate spores, and that the spore size exceeded that known in the family—features that, together with the apothecial anatomy, supported recognition at generic rank. The authors also included a new combination for the widespread paleotropical crustose species Septotrapelia triseptata (Hepp) Aptroot, based on Lecidea triseptata (type: Java). The 2006 generic name, however, was not validly published under the prevalent nomenclatural rules: Index Fungorum records it as nom. inval., citing Art. 38.5(a), indicating that the protologue lacked a compliant description/diagnosis or reference to one. The name was validated the following year by Aptroot and co-authors, who published the genus and type species in Fungal Diversity (2007), where they also treated the combination S. triseptata.

== Description ==
Septotrapelia comprises small, bluish-grey, squamulose (scale-forming) lichens. The thallus is dull, pruinose (with a fine powdering) and forms convex, elongate squamules about 0.2–0.4 mm wide and up to 2 mm long that may overlap into a pannose mat; thinner thalli are packed with algal cells, whereas thicker ones develop a white medulla beneath the algal layer. The upper cortex is irregularly paraplectenchymatous and crystal-laden; no hypothallus is developed.

Apothecia are biatorine (with a pale, thallus-coloured margin), initially round then often lobed, 0.5–2.0 mm in diameter, with a dark chocolate-brown, dull disc that may carry sparse white pruina. The proper margin is prominent and can stand above the disc. The exciple is sharply delimited, with an outer hyaline layer over a mottled dark-brown inner portion; the hypothecium is similarly dark brown. The hymenium is non-inspersed, and the epihymenium is brown with tiny crystals. The supporting threads between spore sacs (paraphyses) have internal walls and fuse together where they meet. The spore sacs (asci) have a distinctive cap structure (tholus) characteristic of the family Ectolechiaceae that stains blue with iodine after alkali treatment (IKI+ after KOH). Spores are colourless, club-shaped (clavate), and divided by three cross-walls (3-septate), typically (23–)30–35 × (6–)8–10 μm in size, with a strong constriction at the middle wall and a thin jelly-like outer coating.

Pycnidia occur on the lobes as small, pinkish-yellow spherical structures (about 0.4 mm), producing rod-shaped conidia 5–6 × 1 μm. In standard spot tests the thallus is K−, C−, PD− and UV−; thin-layer chromatography shows usnic acid and a terpene, and the chemistry of the medulla is otherwise unremarkable.

== Habitat and distribution ==
Septotrapelia is a saxicolous (rock-dwelling) genus: the type species (S. glauca) grows on volcanic boulders in open pasture near Volcán Tenorio National Park, Guanacaste, Costa Rica, at around 700 m elevation. Aptroot and co-authors also pointed to two further elements likely assignable to the genus: a sterile, sorediate, squamulose crust from the Galápagos (saxicolous), and a crustose species they recombined as S. triseptata, which is common and often abundant on soil and weathered rock, particularly in tropical Asia.

== Species ==
- Septotrapelia glauca Aptroot & Chaves (2007) – Costa Rica
- Septotrapelia multiseptata Aptroot & K.H.Moon (2014) – South Korea
- Septotrapelia triseptata (Hepp) Aptroot (2007) – tropical Asia
- Septotrapelia usnica (Sipman) Kalb & Bungartz (2013) – Galápagos Islands
