= Asterothyrium atromarginatum =

Scientific classification
- Kingdom: Fungi
- Division: Ascomycota
- Class: Lecanoromycetes
- Order: Graphidales
- Family: Gomphillaceae
- Genus: Asterothyrium
- Species: A. atromarginatum

Binomial name
- Asterothyrium atromarginatum Herrera-Camp. & Lücking (2002)
- Holotype site: Los Tuxtlas, Mexico

Species of lichen

Asterothyrium atromarginatum is a species of foliicolous (leaf-dwelling) lichen in the family Gomphillaceae. Found in Veracruz, Mexico, it was formally described as a new species in 2002 by the lichenologists María de los Ángeles Herrera-Campos and Robert Lücking.

The lichen forms small patches that are rounded to irregular in outline, 0.3 to 1 mm in diameter, smooth to silvery white in colour, and bordered by a distinct black line. The dark line appears to be a prothallus but is actually created by the intensely pigmented outer cells of the thallus cortex. The photobiont partner of Asterothyrium atromarginatum is a species of Trebouxia (a genus of green algae); their cells are more or less spherical and measure 6–8 μm in diameter. Asterothyrium microsporum is similar in morphology to A. atromarginatum, but its thallus lacks the black bordering line.
