= Calopadiopsis =

Scientific classification
- Kingdom: Fungi
- Division: Ascomycota
- Class: Lecanoromycetes
- Order: Lecanorales
- Family: Ectolechiaceae
- Genus: Calopadiopsis; Lücking & R.Sant. (2002)

Type species
- Calopadiopsis tayabasensis (Vain.) Lücking & R.Sant. (2002)

Species
- C. aeruginescens C. tayabasensis

Genus of fungi

Calopadiopsis is a genus of lichen-forming fungi in the family Ectolechiaceae. It was circumscribed in 2002 by the lichenologists Robert Lücking and Rolf Santesson. It has two species:

- Calopadiopsis aeruginescens Lücking (2008)
- Calopadiopsis tayabasensis (Vain.) Lücking & R.Sant. (2002)
