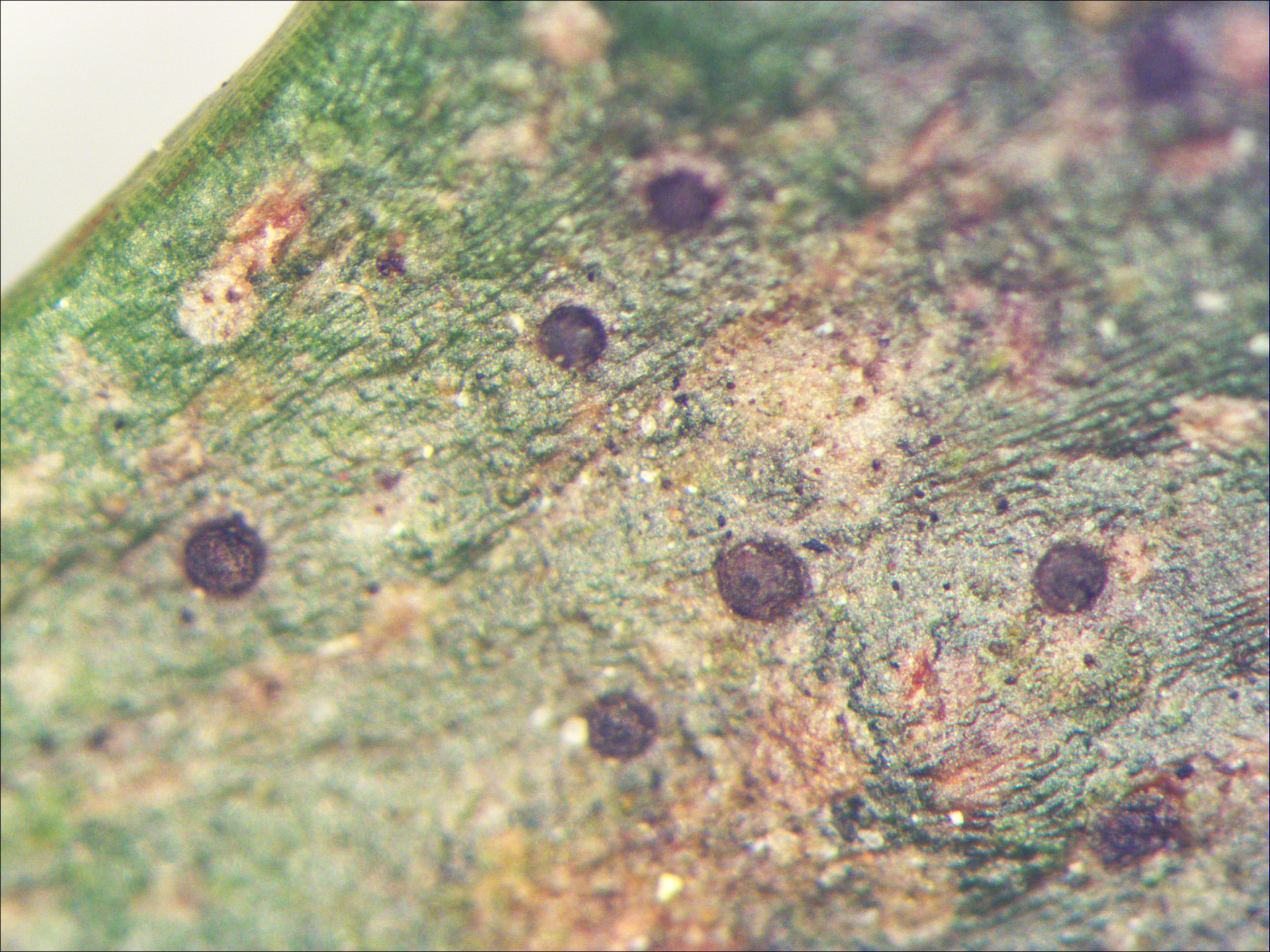
- Tapellaria phyllophila

Scientific classification
- Kingdom: Fungi
- Division: Ascomycota
- Class: Lecanoromycetes
- Order: Lecanorales
- Family: Ectolechiaceae
- Genus: Tapellaria; Müll.Arg. (1890)

Type species
- Tapellaria herpetospora Müll.Arg. (1890)

Synonyms
- Melittosporis Clem. (1909); Mellitiosporiopsis Rehm (1900); Pazschkea Rehm (1898)

= Tapellaria =

Genus of lichen-forming fungi

Tapellaria is a genus of mostly leaf-dwelling lichens in the family Ectolechiaceae. These lichens form thin, paint-like crusts on their host surfaces and are found mainly in tropical regions of the Americas, with about twenty known species. The genus was first proposed in 1890 by the lichenologist Johannes Müller Argoviensis. Tapellaria lichens reproduce both sexually through small black disc-shaped structures and asexually through distinctive hood-shaped outgrowths that release thread-like spores.

== Taxonomy ==
The genus was circumscribed by the lichenologist Johannes Müller Argoviensis in 1890, with Tapellaria herpetospora assigned as the type species. The combination of a chlorococcoid photobiont, black lecideine apothecia, Ectolechiaceae-type asci, muriform or transversely septate spores, and—most decisively—the hood-shaped campylidia with multi-septate thread-like conidia sets Tapellaria apart from superficially similar foliicolous genera such as Badimiella and Kantvilasia.

== Description ==
Tapellaria forms a thin, paint-like crust (a crustose thallus) that sits flush against its leaf or bark substrate and never develops an outer skin (it is ecorticate). A separate prothallus—an early growth fringe visible in some lichens—is absent. Microscopic examination reveals a partner alga with spherical green cells 6–18 μm across; these chlorococcoid cells supply the lichen's photosynthetic energy.

The sexual reproductive bodies are small, black apothecia that rest on the thallus surface, pinched slightly at the base. Their flattened discs remain plane for most of their life and may carry a faint grey or white dusting (pruina). Surrounding each disc is a low rim (the proper exciple) that is the same colour as the disc itself; in cross-section it resembles a shallow cup whose walls are built from dark-pigmented, brick-like cells. Inside, the clear (hyaline) hymenium stains blue with iodine (KI+), indicating the presence of starch-like compounds, and remains firmly gelatinous when treated with potassium hydroxide solution. Slender threads called paraphyses weave through this layer, repeatedly branching and re-joining without swollen tips.

The asci are broad and club-shaped and conform to the Ectolechiaceae type: their walls stain a vivid blue in iodine, and the upper cap (tholus) is thickened and deeply amyloid, pierced by a narrow axial column. Each ascus contains one to eight colourless ascospores, either with several cross-walls (transversely septate) or with both cross- and longitudinal walls forming a brick-like (muriform) pattern; the spores are ellipsoid to cylindrical and lack any gelatinous envelope.

Asexual propagation occurs in distinctive, hood-shaped outgrowths called campylidia. These tiny, erect structures sport in-rolled flaps that protect the spore-producing surface. They release long, thread-like (filiform) conidia divided by three to seven septa; the spores are often slightly curved and may detach with small algal cells attached, allowing the lichen to disperse as a ready-made symbiotic unit. No characteristic secondary metabolites have been detected in the genus.

== Ecology ==
Ecologically, Tapellaria is almost entirely tropical, with about twenty recognised species centred in the Neotropics, and most species grow directly on living leaves (foliicolous).

== Species ==
- Tapellaria albomarginata Lücking (2011)
- Tapellaria bilimbioides R.Sant. (1952)
- Tapellaria corticola Kalb & Vězda (1987)
- Tapellaria epiphylla (Müll.Arg.) R.Sant. (1952)
- Tapellaria floridensis Common & Lücking (2011)
- Tapellaria gilva Zahlbr. (1911)
- Tapellaria granulosa Lücking & Rivas Plata (2011)
- Tapellaria herpetospora Müll.Arg. (1890)
- Tapellaria intermedia Flakus & Lücking (2008) – Bolivia
- Tapellaria isidiata Kalb & Aptroot (2021) – Cameroon
- Tapellaria leonorae M.Cáceres & Lücking (2000) – Brazil
- Tapellaria major (Lücking) Lücking (1999)
- Tapellaria malmei R.Sant. (1952)
- Tapellaria marcellae Lücking (1999) – Ecuador
- Tapellaria moelleri (Henriq. ex Nyl.) R.Sant. (1952)
- Tapellaria nana (Fée) R.Sant. (1952)
- Tapellaria nigrata (Müll.Arg.) R.Sant. (1952)
- Tapellaria palaeotropica G.Neuwirth & Stock.-Wörg. (2017)
- Tapellaria parvimuriformis W.C.Wang & J.C.Wei (2020) – Thailand
- Tapellaria phyllophila (Stirt.) R.Sant. (1952)
- Tapellaria puiggarii (Müll.Arg.) R.Sant. (1952)
- Tapellaria samoana Zahlbr. (1907)
- Tapellaria saxicola Vězda & Poelt (1988)
- Tapellaria schindleri Kalb & Vězda (1987)
- Tapellaria similis Kalb (1992)
