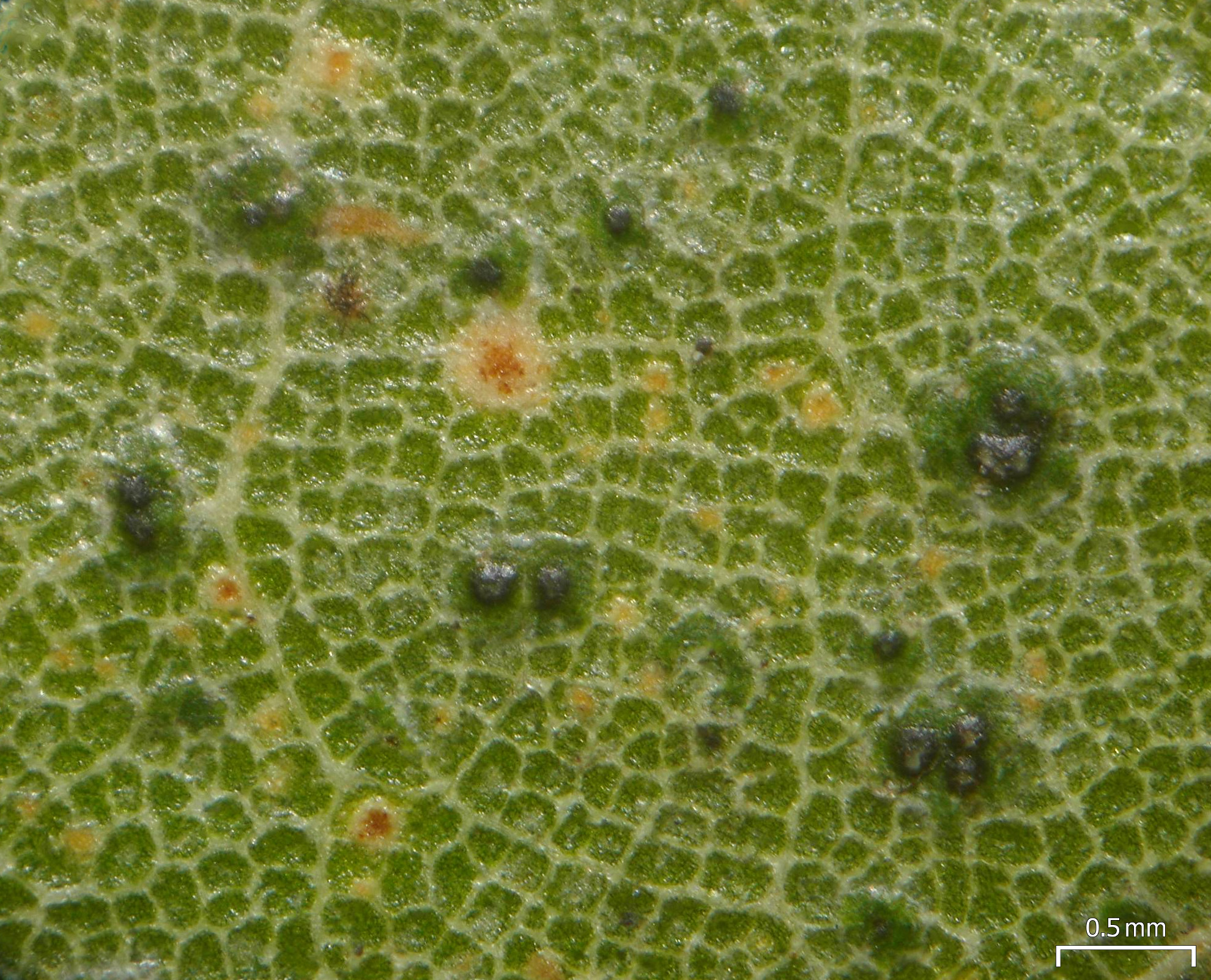
- Asterothyrium decipiens on leaves of Persea, North Carolina

Scientific classification
- Kingdom: Fungi
- Division: Ascomycota
- Class: Lecanoromycetes
- Order: Graphidales
- Family: Gomphillaceae
- Genus: Asterothyrium; Müll.Arg. (1890)

Type species
- Asterothyrium argenteum Müll.Arg. (1890)

Synonyms
- Actinoteichus Cavalc. & Poroca (1971); Asterothyriomyces Cif. & Tomas. (1953); Diplopeltopsis Henn. ex Höhn. (1911); Psorotheciella Sacc. & P.Syd. (1902); Stictoclypeolum Rehm (1904)

= Asterothyrium =

Genus of lichens

Asterothyrium is a genus of leaf-dwelling lichens in the family Gomphillaceae. These tiny lichens form small, star-shaped fruiting bodies on the surface of leaves in tropical and subtropical forests. They are most commonly found in humid, shaded environments where leaves remain moist and clean. The genus includes 19 recognised species distributed primarily throughout Central and South America.

== Taxonomy ==
Asterothyrium was circumscribed by Johannes Müller Argoviensis in 1890 for a group of foliicolous lichens characterised by small, zeorine apothecia with a star-like, lobulate thalline margin (the genus name alludes to this "aster-shaped" rim). Rolf Santesson later selected Asterothyrium argenteum as lectotype in his 1952 monograph. A later, homonymous use of the name Asterothyrium by Paul Hennings (1904) is illegitimate under the botanical code. It corresponds to the genus Septothyrella published by Franz Xaver Rudolf von Höhnel. The genus was originally placed in the family Asterothyriaceae (order Ostropales).

Within Asterothyriaceae, Asterothyrium is set apart by its hemiangiocarpic development and a thallus with a cellular cortex; it is most readily separated from the related Psorotheciopsis, whose apothecia are truly sessile and lack a thalline margin. Species concepts in Asterothyrium have historically been based on the form of the thalline rim and the size and septation of the ascospores, which range from 1-septate to muriform; these features remain important in current treatments.

The South American funga is diverse: Lidia Itatí Ferraro and Robert Lücking (2007) provided a regional revision, describing four new species (A. bisporum, A. rostratum, A. subargenteum, and A. segmentatum) and proposing the new combination A. pallidum for material previously treated as a variety of A. anomalum. Their work also clarified several country records and offered an identification key reflecting the circumscription of the genus.

== Description ==
Asterothyrium species are tiny leaf-dwelling lichens that partner with green alga. Their fruiting bodies (apothecia) sit on the surface of the leaf as small, round discs that range in colour from yellow-green or grey to brown or almost black. A thick, persistent rim made from bits of the lichen body gives many species a star-like outline; in some, this rim bends over part of the disc. This construction is zeorine in form: the margin includes both the inner fungal tissues and an outer, thalline layer derived from the lichen surface. Development is hemiangiocarpic, meaning the young apothecia are initially covered and then open as they mature. The apothecial wall (exciple) is built from tightly packed cells in a jelly-like matrix and reacts iodine-positive (I+ red); the hymenium is colourless and non-amyloid (H–; KI–). The paraphyses are slender and sinuous, often with slightly swollen tips. Asci are ovoid to cylindrical with a conspicuous internal ring (tholus), and the colourless ascospores vary widely among species: there may be one to eight per ascus, they can be short-ellipsoid to cylindrical, with one or several cross-walls or a dense, muriform partitioning; in some species the spore walls are distinctly thickened.

Asexual structures are common and take the form of pycnidia (minute flask- or disc-like bodies that release conidia). Four pycnidial types are reported in the genus: type I are bottle-shaped and immersed to slightly raised; type II are conical or wart-like along the thallus margin; type III are flat, central, and sunk into the thallus under a thin covering; type IV resemble an inverted funnel with a more or less long tube. The conidia are usually colourless and needle- to spindle-shaped, produced by simple, rod-like conidiogenous cells; in different species they may be non-septate or have up to three cross-walls. In the southern South American material, type-IV pycnidia with many simple, rod-shaped conidia were associated with A. rostratum, whereas other species such as A. microsporum and A. umbilicatum show the type-II and type-III conditions respectively.

== Habitat and distribution ==
Asterothyrium species are foliicolous (living on the surfaces of still-attached leaves) so they are tied to warm, humid forests where suitable foliage is continuously available. As with other leaf-dwelling lichens, they are most frequent in tropical to subtropical forest biomes.

In southern South America the genus is well documented from north-eastern Argentina, eastern Paraguay, and adjacent Brazil. Verified records span lowland and foothill forests, including secondary rainforest, gallery forest along rivers, and forest edges; collections come from sites such as the Yungas of Salta (Argentina), riparian and seasonally flooded margins in Corrientes (Argentina), and protected forest in Alto Paraná, Amambay, Caazapá, Itapúa and Canindeyú (Paraguay), with additional material from Rio Grande do Sul (Brazil).

Because they grow on living leaves, host choice is broad but restricted to plants with long-lived, clean laminae in humid shade. Reported hosts include species of Cupania (Sapindaceae), Trichilia (Meliaceae), Piper (Piperaceae), and members of Rubiaceae and Bignoniaceae, as well as grasses such as Merostachys. Collections note microhabitats such as forest understory, stream banks, and seasonally wet clearings—places that remain moist yet receive intermittent light.

== Species ==
As of September 2025, Species Fungorum (in the Catalogue of Life) accepts 19 species of Asterothyrium:

- Asterothyrium argenteum Müll.Arg. (1890)
- Asterothyrium atromarginatum Herrera-Camp. & Lücking (2002)
- Asterothyrium bisporum L.I.Ferraro & Lücking (2007)
- Asterothyrium decipiens (Rehm) R.Sant. (1952)
- Asterothyrium filiforme Lücking & R.Sant. (2008)
- Asterothyrium microsporum R.Sant. (1952)
- Asterothyrium microthyrioides Henn. (1904)
- Asterothyrium monosporum Müll.Arg. (1890)
- Asterothyrium octomerum R.Sant. (1952)
- Asterothyrium pallidum (Henssen & Lücking) L.I.Ferraro & Lücking (2007)
- Asterothyrium pernambucense (Cavalc.) Lücking & Sérus. (1998)
- Asterothyrium pittieri Müll.Arg. (1891)
- Asterothyrium rondoniense Bat. & H.Maia ex Henssen & Lücking (1999)
- Asterothyrium rostratum L.I.Ferraro & Lücking (2007)
- Asterothyrium sasae Y.Suto (2018)
- Asterothyrium segmentatum L.I.Ferraro & Lücking (2007)
- Asterothyrium septemseptatum Lücking (1999)
- Asterothyrium subargenteum L.I.Ferraro & Lücking (2007)
- Asterothyrium vezdae Flakus & Lücking (2008)
