= Byssolecania =

Scientific classification
- Kingdom: Fungi
- Division: Ascomycota
- Class: Lecanoromycetes
- Order: Lecanorales
- Family: Ectolechiaceae
- Genus: Byssolecania; Vain. (1921)

Type species
- Byssolecania fuscolivida Vain. (1921)

Species
- B. fuscolivida B. pluriseptata B. subvezdae B. variabilis B. vezdae

Genus of lichen-forming fungi

Byssolecania is a genus of lichen-forming fungi in the family Ectolechiaceae.

== Species ==
As of July 2024, Species Fungorum (in the Catalogue of Life) accept five species of Byssolecania:

- Byssolecania fuscolivida Vain. (1921)
- Byssolecania pluriseptata Breuss (2007)
- Byssolecania subvezdae Lücking (2004)
- Byssolecania variabilis Vězda, Kalb & Lücking (2000)
- Byssolecania vezdae Kalb & Lücking (2000)
