= Barubria =

Scientific classification
- Kingdom: Fungi
- Division: Ascomycota
- Class: Lecanoromycetes
- Order: Lecanorales
- Family: Ectolechiaceae
- Genus: Barubria; Vězda (1986)
- Species: B. fuscorubra

Binomial name
- Barubria fuscorubra (Vězda) Vězda (1986)

Synonyms
- Bacidia fuscorubra Vězda (1975)

Single-species fungal genus

Barubria is a fungal genus in the family Ectolechiaceae. It contain a single species Barubria fuscorubra, a leaf-dwelling lichen. The genus was established in 1986 by the Czech lichenologist Antonín Vězda, based on material collected from Guinea (West Africa). It is characterised by dark blue, sharply pointed campylidia (asexual spore-producing structures) and by asci (spore sacs) whose tip stains blue in iodine. The species forms a thin, smooth crust on leaf surfaces and produces brown fruiting bodies (apothecia) that narrow where they meet the crust.

== Taxonomy ==
In 1986, Antonín Vězda established Barubria when he split an informal group he called "Lobaca", using differences in ascus (spore sac) structure. Genera with a Sporopodium-type ascus and campylidia (specialised asexual spore-producing structures) were placed in an expanded Ectolechiaceae. Within that group, Vězda recognised five new genera, including Barubria. He placed the Byssoloma-type lineage in Pilocarpaceae (since synonymized with Ectolechiaceae) as Fellhanera. Barubria was published as monospecific, meaning it contained a single species. Its type and only species is B. fuscorubra, published as a new combination (comb. nov.) based on the basionym Bacidia fuscorubra. The type collection is from Sérédou (Macenta Prefecture, Guinea).

Barubria is defined by a combination of microscopic traits: a thin, even thallus; biatorine apothecia constricted at the base, with a flat to slightly convex disc; a paraplectenchymatous exciple that lacks crystals; densely branched, anastomosing paraphyses; and clavate asci with a J+ tholus (staining blue in iodine) of the Sporopodium type. The ascospores are ellipsoid and 3-septate, meaning they are divided into four cells. The genus produces dark blue campylidia that taper to a sharp apex and release short-stalked, fusiform conidia. In overall appearance, Barubria can resemble Fellhanera, but it differs in its ascus type and in having campylidia. It also differs from Badimia (which also has 3-septate spores) by lacking crystals in the exciple and by producing a different campylidial conidial type. In Vězda's identification key to Ectolechiaceae, Barubria is identified by the combination of 3-septate spores (eight per ascus), branched and anastomosing paraphyses, and lanceolate, one-celled campylidial conidia.

The name Barubria flavescens was proposed for inclusion in Barubria in 1999, but it was later transferred to the monotypic genus Baflavia as Baflavia flavescens.

== Description ==
Barubria forms a thin, even thallus, a smooth, film-like crust, on leaf surfaces (foliicolous). Its apothecia are biatorine (with a pale, proper margin rather than a thalline margin). They are characteristically narrowed where they meet the thallus, and the disc is flat to slightly convex. The apothecial rim (exciple) is paraplectenchymatous (brick-wall-like tissue) and lacks crystals. The hymenial threads (paraphyses) are densely branched and often anastomose, meaning they fork and re-join. The asci are clavate (club-shaped) and have a J+ tholus, meaning the apical dome turns blue in iodine, with a Sporopodium-type structure.

Ascospores are colourless, ellipsoid and 3-septate (four-celled), typically eight per ascus. The genus also produces distinctive campylidia, specialised asexual fruit bodies. They are dark blue and taper to a sharply pointed apex, and they release short-stalked, fusiform (spindle-shaped) conidia that are one-celled and lanceolate in face view. The lichen can resemble Fellhanera in overall appearance, but it differs in having a Sporopodium-type ascus and in producing campylidia. It differs from Badimia by lacking crystals in the exciple and by having a different form of campylidia.

== Habitat and distribution ==
Barubria is foliicolous (living on leaves) and, as originally circumscribed, was known only from Africa; the genus was published as monospecific. The type and only species, B. fuscorubra, is based on material from Guinea (West Africa), from Macenta Prefecture (Sérédou), at 900 m.
