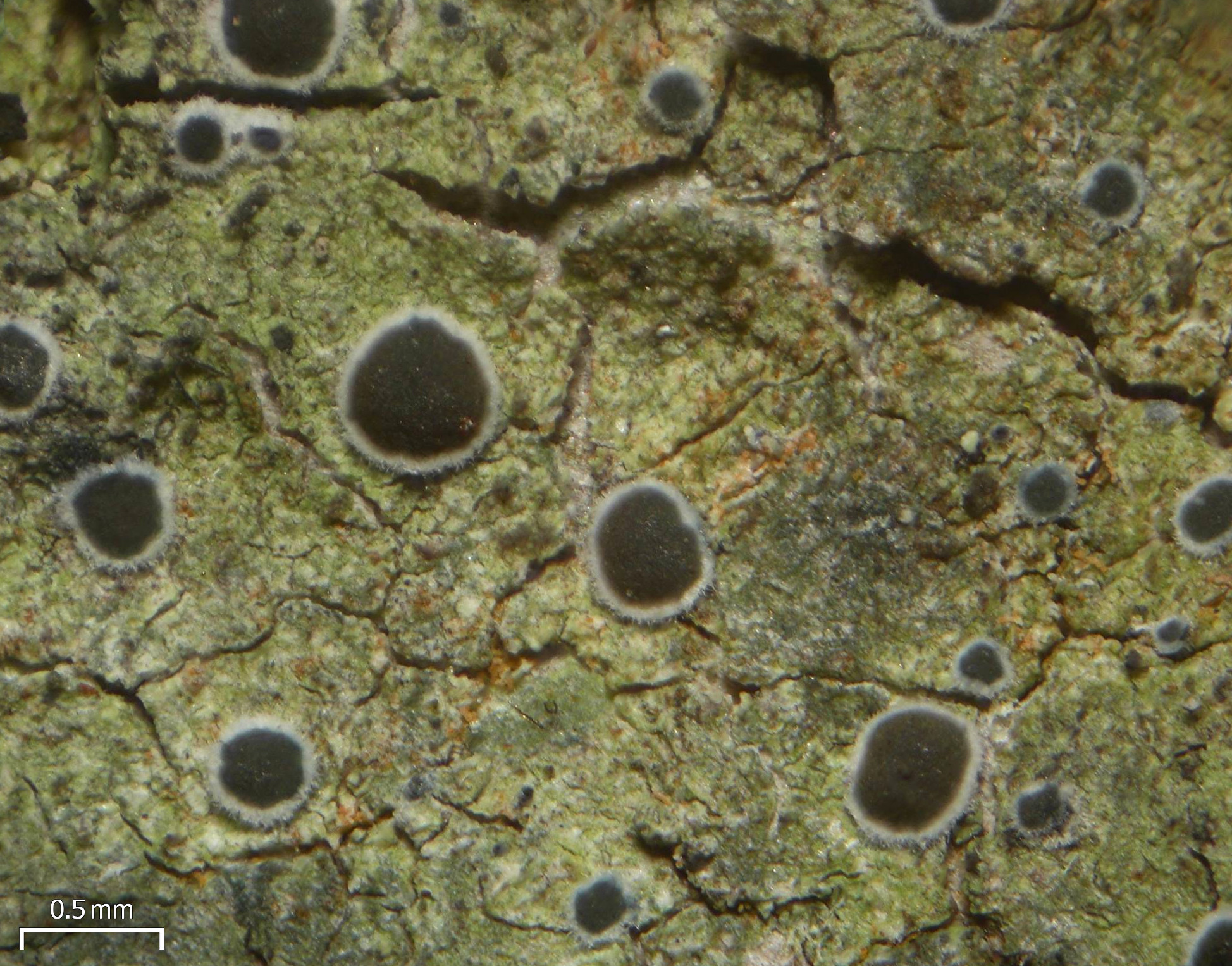
- Byssoloma leucoblepharum

Scientific classification
- Kingdom: Fungi
- Division: Ascomycota
- Class: Lecanoromycetes
- Order: Lecanorales
- Family: Ectolechiaceae
- Genus: Byssoloma; Trevis. (1853)

Type species
- Byssoloma leprieurii Trevis. (1853)

Species
- See text

Synonyms
- Calidia Stirt. (1876); Limbalba Nieuwl. (1916); Pilocarpon Vain. (1890); Tricholechia A.Massal. (1853); Wainioa Nieuwl. (1916)

= Byssoloma =

Genus of lichen-forming fungi

Byssoloma is a genus of leaf-dwelling lichens in the family Ectolechiaceae.

== Taxonomy ==
The genus was circumscribed by the Italian botanist Vittore Benedetto Antonio Trevisan de Saint-Léon in 1853.

== Description ==
Species in genus Byssoloma form crustose, effuse (spreading) lichens that lack a cortex (outer protective layer). Their photobiont, or photosynthetic partner, is of the chlorococcoid type, a form of green algae.

The apothecia (fruiting bodies), are sessile (directly attached to the thallus without a stalk) and approximately circular in shape. They lack a thalline margin (a rim formed by the lichen thallus) and possess a true exciple, which is a layer of loosely arranged hyphae that can appear hairy or web-like (tomentose-arachnoid) in some species. The hymenium, the spore-bearing tissue, reacts with iodine to turn blue (I+ blue). The hamathecium, consisting of paraphyses (filamentous support structures), is unbranched or slightly branched and not or only slightly thickened at the tips.

The hypothecium, a layer beneath the hymenium, is dark red-brown and may turn purple when treated with potassium hydroxide (K) solution in European species. The asci, which are the sac-like structures where spores develop, typically contain eight spores. They have thick walls and a blue-staining apical dome with a darker blue tubular ring structure and an amyloid (starch-like) gelatinous coat.

The ascospores are three-septate (having three internal partitions), colourless, and found in European species. Asexual reproductive structures, the pycnidia, are also sessile and roughly spherical, usually covered by a layer of loosely interwoven hyphae. The conidiophores (spore-producing cells) are unbranched, forming flask-shaped, bacillar (rod-like), or ellipsoidal conidia (asexual spores) that are constricted in the middle.

Chemically, argopsin, a secondary metabolite (lichen product), is sometimes detected in one species, but otherwise, Byssoloma lacks lichen products.

== Species ==
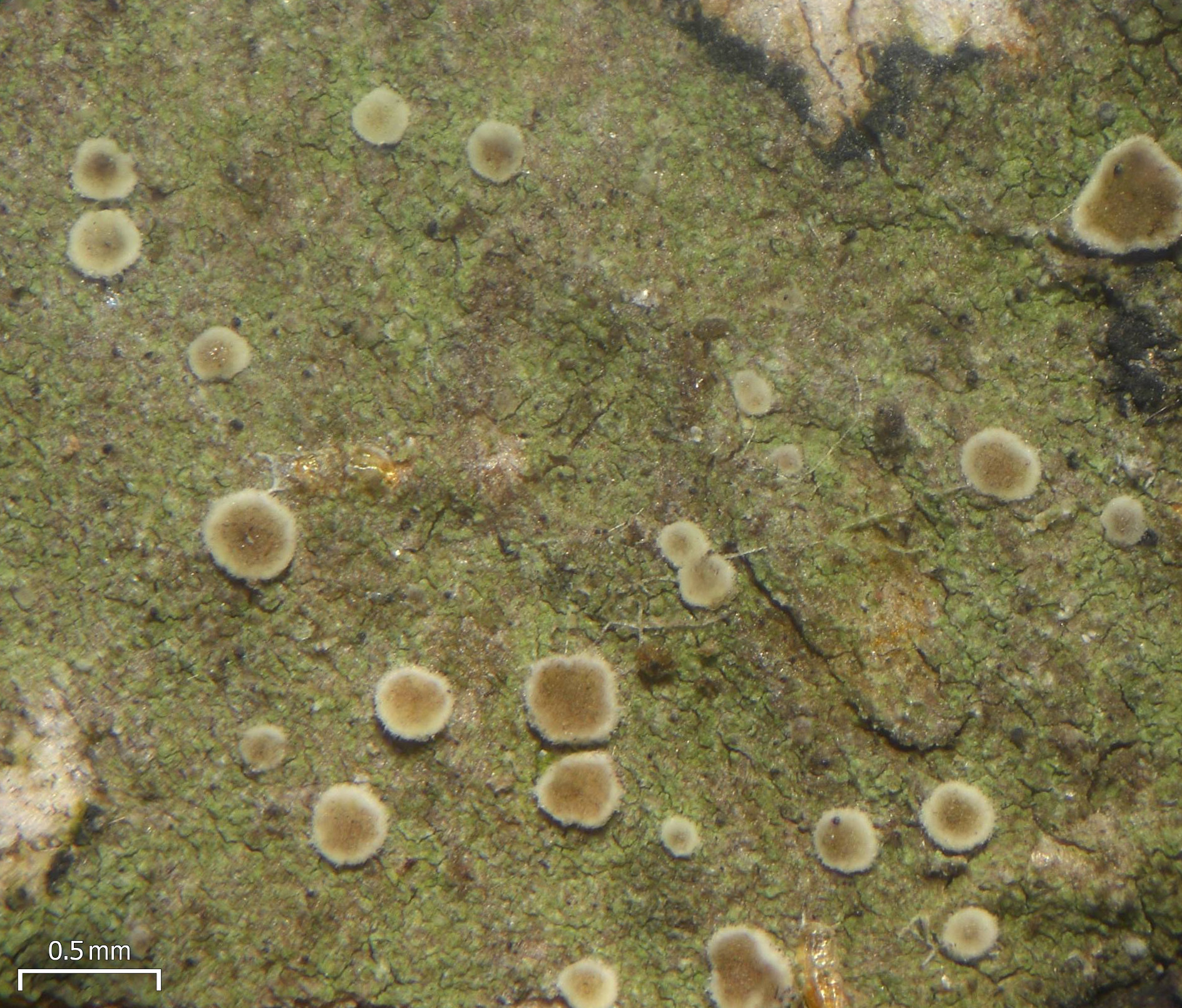
Byssoloma meadii

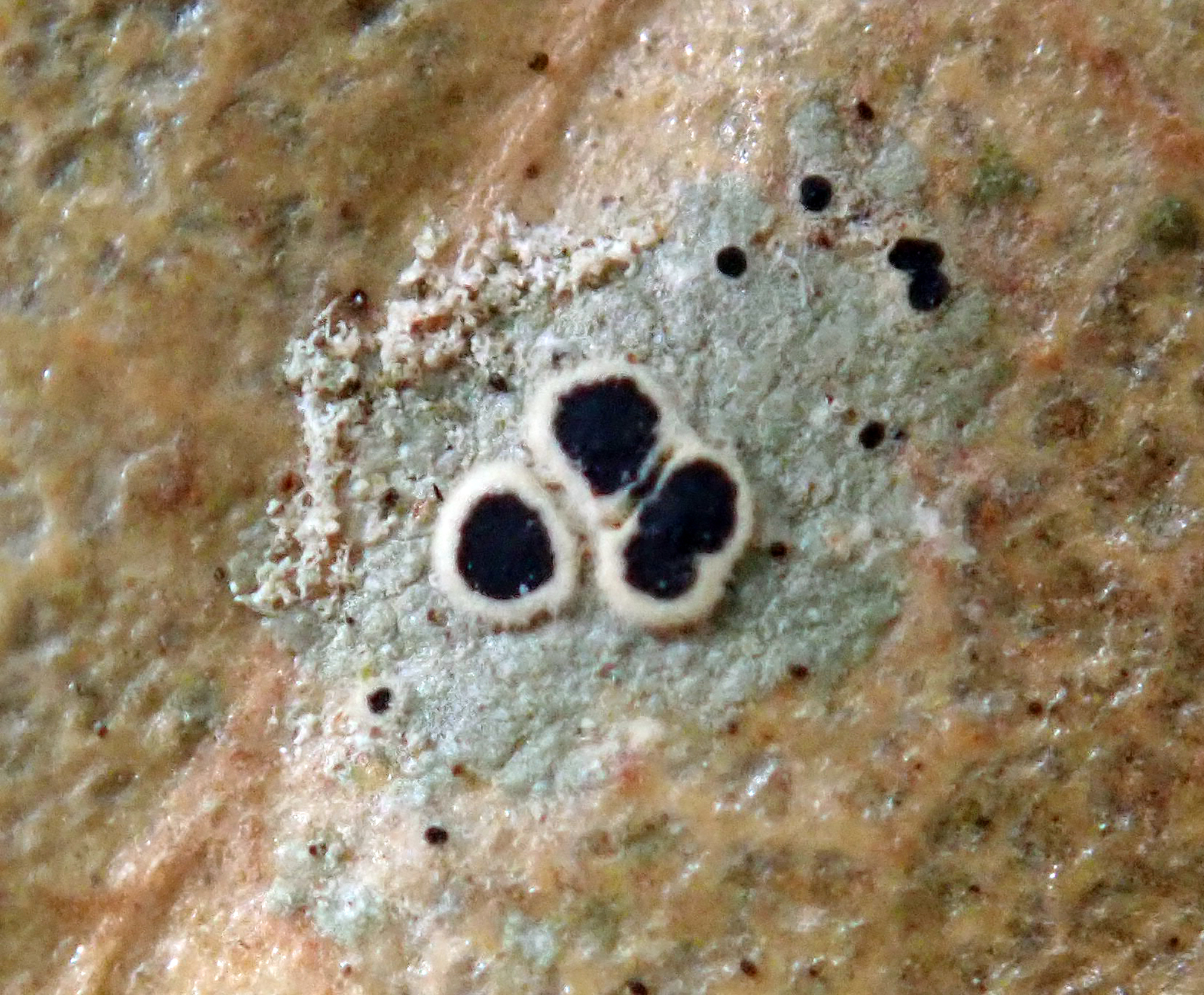
Byssoloma subdiscordans

As of July 2024, Species Fungorum accepts 39 species of Byssoloma.

- Byssoloma annuum (Vain.) G.Thor, Lücking & Tat.Matsumoto (2000)
- Byssoloma aurantiacum Kalb & Vězda (1990)
- Byssoloma australiense P.M.McCarthy & Elix (2018)
- Byssoloma braulioi Lücking (2008)
- Byssoloma brunneodiscum W.C.Wang & J.C.Wei (2020) – China
- Byssoloma carneum Rain.Schub., Greber & Lücking (2003)
- Byssoloma catarinense L.I.Ferraro & Lücking (2008)
- Byssoloma catillariosporum M.Cáceres, M.W.O.Santos & Aptroot (2013)
- Byssoloma chlorinum (Vain.) Zahlbr. (1932)
- Byssoloma confusum Farkas & Vězda (1993)
- Byssoloma diederichii Sérus. (1998)
- Byssoloma dimerelloides Sipman & Aptroot (1991)
- Byssoloma discordans (Vain.) Zahlbr. (1923)
- Byssoloma fuscothallinum Lücking (2006)
- Byssoloma fuscum van den Boom (2016)
- Byssoloma humboldtianum Lücking & Kalb (2000)
- Byssoloma hypophyllum Lücking & Kalb (2000)
- Byssoloma kakouettae (Sérus.) Lücking & Sérus. (2002)
- Byssoloma kalbii Sérus. (1996) – Madeira
- Byssoloma laurisilvae Breuss (2013) – Europe
- Byssoloma leucoblepharum (Nyl.) Vain. (1926)
- Byssoloma llimonae Sérus., Gómez-Bolea, Longán & Lücking (2002)
- Byssoloma maderense Breuss (2014)
- Byssoloma marginatum (Arnold) Sérus. (1992)
- Byssoloma meadii (Tuck.) S.Ekman (1996)
- Byssoloma melanodiscocarpum W.C.Wang & J.C.Wei (2020) – China
- Byssoloma microcarpum Kalb & Vězda (1994)
- Byssoloma multipunctatum Lücking (2008)
- Byssoloma murinum Vězda (1987)
- Byssoloma orientale K.Miyaz. & Y.Ohmura (2023) – East Asia
- Byssoloma permutans (Nyl.) Lücking (2013)
- Byssoloma rubrofuscum W.C.Wang & J.C.Wei (2020) – China
- Byssoloma rubromarginatum Messuti & de la Rosa (2007)
- Byssoloma spinulosum Sérus. (2011)
- Byssoloma sprucei (C.Bab. ex Müll.Arg.) Lücking & M.Cáceres (2008)
- Byssoloma subdiscordans (Nyl.) P.James (1971)
- Byssoloma subleucoblepharum G.Thor, Lücking & Tat.Matsumoto (2000)
- Byssoloma subundulatum (Stirt.) Vězda (1986)
- Byssoloma tricholomum (Mont.) Zahlbr. (1923)
- Byssoloma vanderystii Sérus. (1979) – Africa
- Byssoloma xanthonicum Aptroot (2014) – New Caledonia
