= Lasioloma =

Scientific classification
- Kingdom: Fungi
- Division: Ascomycota
- Class: Lecanoromycetes
- Order: Lecanorales
- Family: Ectolechiaceae
- Genus: Lasioloma; R.Sant. (1952)

Type species
- Lasioloma arachnoideum (Kremp.) R.Sant. (1952)

Genus of lichen-forming fungi

Lasioloma is a genus of lichenized fungi in the family Ectolechiaceae. The genus was circumscribed by the Swedish lichenologist Rolf Santesson in 1952, with Lasioloma arachnoideum assigned as the type species. Found predominantly in tropical rainforests, genus Lasioloma contains both foliicolous (leaf-dwelling) and corticolous (bark-dwelling) species. The foliicolous species are distinguished by their woolly prothallus (initial growth stage), a thallus that ranges from dispersed to continuous, and a hairy apothecial margin (the edge of the spore-producing structure). In contrast, corticolous species typically do not have a woolly prothallus, and their thalli are usually continuous, or unbroken. Regardless of the substrate they inhabit, all known Lasioloma species are characterized by the production of campylidia (types of specialized reproductive structures) and branched conidia (asexual, non-motile spores).

== Species ==
- Lasioloma antillarum Lücking, Högnabba & Sipman (2021) – Antilles
- Lasioloma appendiculatum Breuss (2002) – Nicaragua
- Lasioloma arachnoideum (Kremp.) R.Sant. (1952)
- Lasioloma corticola P.M.McCarthy (2020) – Australia
- Lasioloma heliotropicum Bat. & M.P.Herrera (1964)
- Lasioloma inexspectatum R.Sant. & Lücking (1999)
- Lasioloma longiramosum W.C.Wang & A.Abas (2023) – China
- Lasioloma krishnasinghii Jagad.Ram & G.P.Sinha (2022) – Andaman Islands
- Lasioloma pauciseptatum van den Boom (2018) – Suriname
- Lasioloma phycophilum (Vain.) R.Sant. (1952)
- Lasioloma phycophorum (Vain.) R.Sant. (1952)
- Lasioloma spinosum Hafellner & Vězda (1994)
- Lasioloma stephanellum (Nyl.) Lücking & Sérus. (2001)
- Lasioloma trichophorum (Vain.) R.Sant. (1952)
- Lasioloma verrucosum W.C.Wang & X.L.Wei (2023) – China
