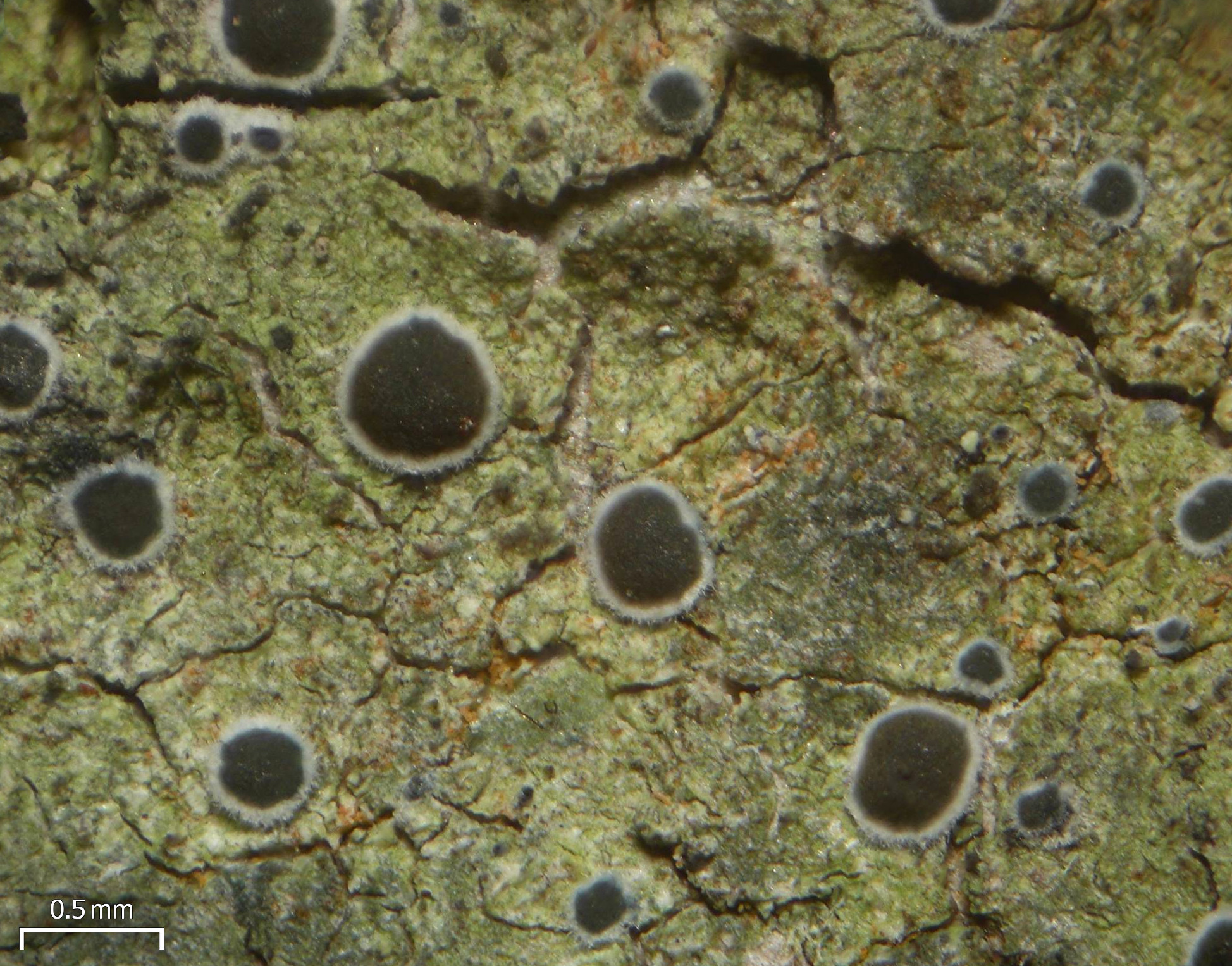
- Byssoloma leucoblepharum; scale bar is 0.5 mm

Scientific classification
- Kingdom: Fungi
- Division: Ascomycota
- Class: Lecanoromycetes
- Order: Lecanorales
- Family: Ectolechiaceae; Zahlbr. (1905)

Type genus
- Ectolechia Trevis. (1852)

Synonyms
- Pilocarpaceae Zahlbr. (1905); Byssolomataceae Zahlbr. (1926); Lasiolomataceae Hafellner (1984); Micareaceae Vězda ex Hafellner (1984); Roccellinastraceae Hafellner (1984)

= Ectolechiaceae =

Family of lichen-forming fungi

The Ectolechiaceae are a family of lichen-forming fungi in the order Lecanorales. The species of this family have a cosmopolitan distribution and have been found in a variety of climatic regions. The family was first described by Alexander Zahlbruckner in 1905, originally for a group of tropical, leaf-dwelling lichens. Its scope has since expanded considerably, and the family now encompasses both tropical genera such as Byssoloma and Calopadia and the large, predominantly temperate-to-arctic genus Micarea. As of 2026, the family contains more than 30 genera and an estimated 470 species. It has also been referred to in some sources as Pilocarpaceae, although current treatments use Ectolechiaceae.

== Taxonomy ==
Ectolechiaceae was circumscribed by Alexander Zahlbruckner in Adolf Engler's influential 1905 work Die Natürlichen Pflanzenfamilien. Zahlbruckner defined the family around small, crust-forming lichens with a single-celled green alga as the partner (then referred to as Protococcus), and described them as producing tiny, round apothecia that begin sunken in the thallus and later sit on the surface, usually without a well-developed margin. He noted that the disc may be flat to shallowly cup-shaped and either exposed from the start or temporarily covered when young by a thin skin that later tears away, and he characterised the internal tissues by well-developed paraphyses and asci bearing one to eight colourless spores ranging from simply septate to strongly multi-septate (muriform) forms. In his treatment the family was confined to tropical, leaf-dwelling lichens (including those on fern fronds), and he subdivided it into several genera on the basis of spore form, paraphysis structure, and whether algal cells occur in the upper or lower apothecial layers, recognising groups such as Asterothyrium, Lopadiopsis, Sporopodium, Lecaniella, Arthotheliopsis, and Actinoplaca.

The family name Ectolechiaceae is based on the generic name Ectolechia, which has largely fallen out of use in modern classifications. Current treatments instead apply the relevant generic names (such as Sporopodium) to the ectolechiaceous lineage discussed in recent phylogenetic work. (Note: The name Ectolechia has been applied in more than one sense and its current synonymy differs among databases. Index Fungorum treats Ectolechia Trevis. (1852) as a synonym of Sporopodium, whereas MycoBank links the name to Ocellularia; Ectolechia A.Massal. (1853) is an illegitimate later homonym (Art. 53.1), meaning the name cannot be used because it was published after another genus had already been given the same name.)

In older classification systems, the mainly tropical, leaf-dwelling (foliicolous) genera now treated in this family were often separated from largely temperate crustose lineages such as Micarea, which was commonly treated as the type genus of a separate family, Micareaceae. Morphological comparisons in the late 20th century and early molecular studies both questioned whether those family boundaries reflected evolutionary history, and proposed that the foliicolous "pilocarpaceous" element and the micareoid Micarea lineage belong to a single broader family concept.

Using mitochondrial small-subunit rDNA data, Andersen and Ekman concluded that Micarea (in its traditional sense) does not remain a single lineage unless the predominantly foliicolous taxa traditionally treated in Pilocarpaceae/Ectolechiaceae are included, and they therefore treated Micareaceae and Ectolechiaceae as synonyms within an expanded family. On nomenclatural grounds they argued that the correct name for that expanded family would be Pilocarpaceae, because Pilocarpaceae and Ectolechiaceae were both published in 1905 whereas Micareaceae was introduced later.

That name choice is not followed under current nomenclature because Pilocarpaceae Zahlbr. (1905) is an illegitimate later homonym of Pilocarpaceae J.Agardh (1858). Recent treatments therefore use Ectolechiaceae as the correct family name for the clade historically discussed under Pilocarpaceae, and regard Byssolomataceae (used in some databases) as a later synonym. In analyses using multiple genetic loci, a mainly tropical, foliicolous assemblage (often discussed as Ectolechiaceae sensu stricto and including genera such as Byssoloma, Calopadia, Fellhanera, Lasioloma and Sporopodium) is recovered as distinct from the temperate-to-arctic lineages centred on Micarea (including Helocarpon), clarifying why single-locus trees previously produced contradictory "family" signals.

== Description ==
Ectolechiaceae species are crustose and have ascomata in the form of brightly-coloured apothecia (fruiting bodies) with a poorly-developed margin comprising loosely-intertwined hyphae. The ascospores are hyaline and often elongated with one or more septa.

== Genera ==
Ectolechiaceae (listed as Byssolomataceae in the Catalogue of Life) contains 34 genera and an estimated 470 species. The following list shows the genera, authority, year of publication, and number of species as of 2026.

- Aquacidia Aptroot (2018) – 3 spp.
- Badimiella Malcolm & Vězda (1994) – 1 sp.
- Baflavia Lücking (2008) – 1 sp.
- Bapalmuia Sérus. (1993) – 23 spp.
- Barubria Vězda (1986) – 1 sp.
- Brasilicia Lücking, Kalb & Serus. (2008) – 6 spp.
- Bryogomphus Lücking, W.R.Buck, Sérus. & L.I.Ferraro (2005) – 1 sp.
- Byssolecania Vain. (1921) – 8 spp.
- Byssoloma Trevis. (1853) – 53 spp.
- Calopadia Vězda (1986) – 24 spp.
- Calopadiopsis Lücking & R.Sant. (2002) – 2 spp.
- Ceratopycnidium Maubl. (1907) – 2 spp.
- Eugeniella Lücking, Sérus. & Kalb (2008) – 13 spp.
- Fellhanera Vězda (1986) – 69 spp.
- Fellhaneropsis Sérus. & Coppins (1996) – 11 spp.
- Helocarpon Th.Fr. (1860) – 4 spp.
- Kantvilasia P.M.McCarthy, Elix & Sérus. (2000) – 1 sp.
- Karinomyces Howland, Boggess, Hollinger & Lendemer (2026) – 1 sp.
- Lasioloma R.Sant. (1952) – 12 spp.
- Loflammia Vězda (1986) – 4 spp.
- Loflammiopsis Lücking & Kalb (2000) – 1 sp.
- Logilvia Vězda (1986) – 1 sp.
- Micarea Fr. (1825) – 156 spp.
- Podotara Malcolm & Vězda (1996) – 1 sp.
- Pseudocalopadia Lücking (1999) – 2 spp.
- Roccellinastrum Follmann (1968) – 7 spp.
- Septotrapelia Aptroot & Chaves (2007) – 4 spp.
- Sporopodiopsis Sérus. (1997) – 2 spp.
- Sporopodium Mont. (1851) – 19 spp.
- Szczawinskia A.Funk (1984) – 4 spp.
- Tapellaria Müll.Arg. (1890) – 23 spp.
- Tapellariopsis Lücking (1999) – 1 sp.

Several generic names historically applied in Ectolechiaceae are treated as synonyms in recent multilocus work. For example, the monotypic genus Leimonis is treated as a synonym of Helocarpon, and Szczawinskia is treated as a synonym of Micarea; some databases and checklists continue to list these names separately, which can lead to differences in reported genus counts between sources.
