= Fellhanera borbonica =

Scientific classification
- Kingdom: Fungi
- Division: Ascomycota
- Class: Lecanoromycetes
- Order: Lecanorales
- Family: Ectolechiaceae
- Genus: Fellhanera
- Species: F. borbonica

Binomial name
- Fellhanera borbonica Sérus., van den Boom & Brand (2011)
- Holotype: forêt de Bois de Couleur des Hauts, Réunion

Species of lichen-forming fungus

Fellhanera borbonica is a rare species of lichen-forming fungus in the family Ectolechiaceae. Described in 2011 from a single specimen collected in the montane rainforests of Réunion, this lichen is distinctive for being the first member of its genus to produce ascospores with a complex internal structure divided by multiple walls. The species forms inconspicuous grey-green crusts on shaded volcanic rock and produces small black fruiting bodies with a violet tinge when fresh. It is known only from its original discovery site at about 1,500 metres elevation in the humid "Bois de Couleur des Hauts" forest.

== Taxonomy ==
Fellhanera borbonica was described in 2011 by Emmanuël Sérusiaux, van den Boom and Brand on the basis of a single gathering from the montane "Bois de Couleur des Hauts" forest on Réunion. The new species expands the concept of the mainly tropical, crust-forming genus Fellhanera (family Ectolechiaceae), which until then had contained only taxa with thin-walled, single-septate spores. F. borbonica is the first member of the genus to develop truly sub-muriform to muriform ascospores—spores divided by both cross-walls and one or two longitudinal walls—and to produce biclavate (club-shaped at both ends) asexual conidia. These characters set it apart from morphologically similar species such as F. elliottii and F. paradoxa, whose spores are longer and whose conidia are narrowly bacillar or pear-shaped. The epithet borbonica recalls Île Bourbon, the historical name of Réunion.

== Description ==
The lichen forms an inconspicuous grey-green to pale-grey crust on shaded basalt, the thallus cracking into tiny polygonal areoles 0.4–0.7 mm across. A thin algal layer of spherical green cells (5–8 μm in diameter) lies beneath a thin fungal cortex; where the surface is fissured, the white medulla is visible under high magnification. Black-brown apothecia (fruiting bodies) are uncommon but distinctive: 0.5–0.7 mm wide, strongly constricted at the base and capped by a flat to slightly convex disc with a violet flush when fresh. The exciple is barely 30 micrometres (μm) thick and grades from a paraplectenchymatous interior to a loose mesh of outward-pointing hyphae at the rim. Below a colourless hymenium 60–65 μm tall lies a dark-brown hypothecium up to 70 μm thick that remains unchanged in potassium hydroxide solution (K–). Asci are club-shaped and contain eight ellipsoid spores, each 18–20 × 5–7 μm with three to four cross-walls and one or two oblique or longitudinal walls; a gelatinous halo surrounds every spore and shows best after treatment with K. Half-embedded pycnidia with orange-tinged walls produce masses of simple, club-shaped conidia 4–5 × 1.5–2 μm. Standard chemical spot tests and thin-layer chromatography detect no lichen substances.

== Habitat and distribution ==
Fellhanera borbonica is known only from its type locality on Réunion, where it occupies a shaded basaltic outcrop at about 1500 m elevation. The site is a disturbed but still humid pocket of montane rainforest dominated by mixed broad-leaved "Bois de Couleur" species. The crust grows directly on the volcanic rock rather than on bark or soil. F. borbonica is one of two Fellhanera species that have been recorded from Réunion; the other is F. bouteillei.
