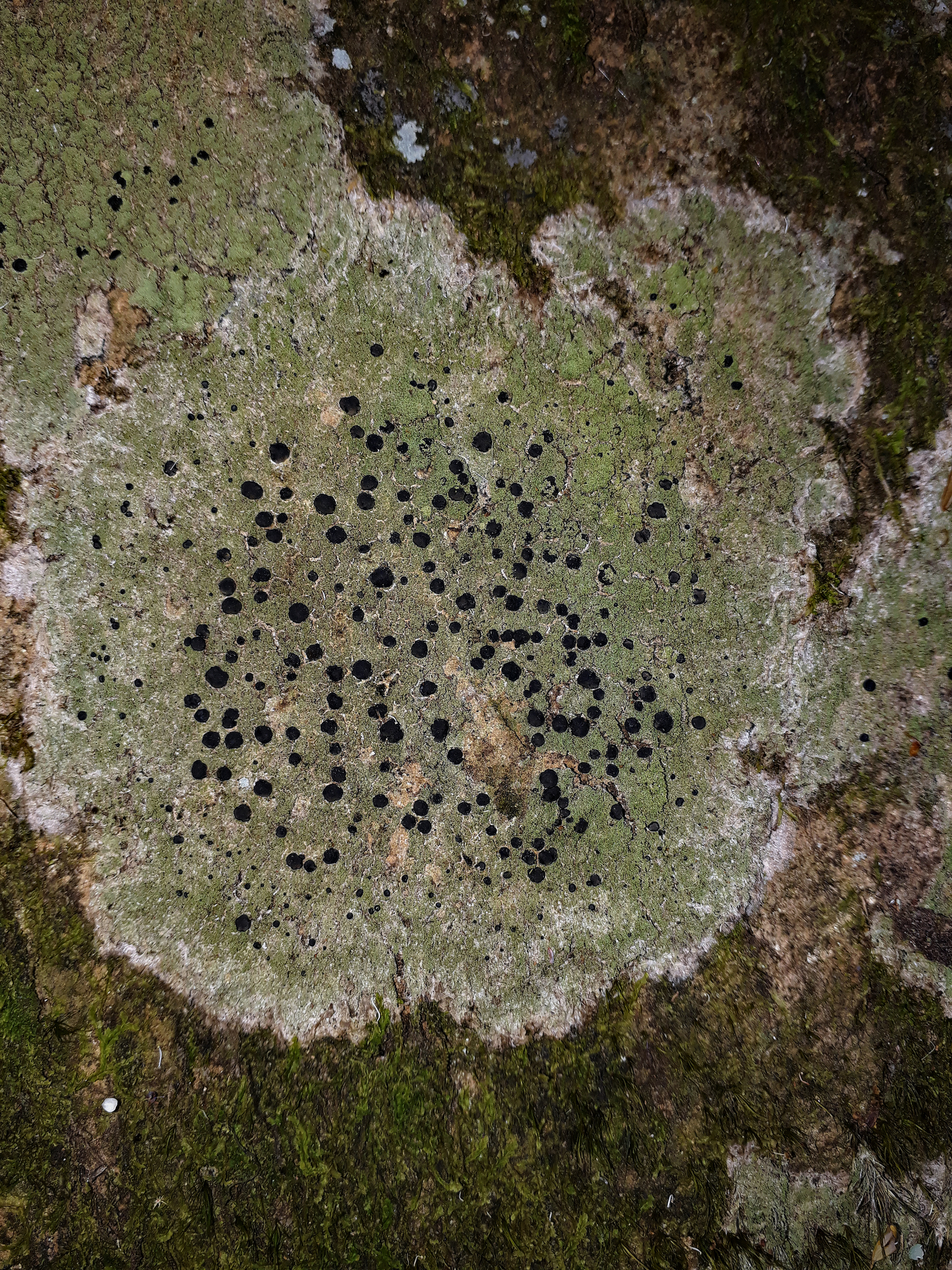
- Saxicolous Megalaria crispisulcans at Maungaraho, Kaipara District

Scientific classification
- Domain: Eukaryota
- Kingdom: Fungi
- Division: Ascomycota
- Class: Lecanoromycetes
- Order: Lecanorales
- Family: Ramalinaceae
- Genus: Megalaria
- Species: M. crispisulcans

Binomial name
- Megalaria crispisulcans A.J.Marshall, Blanchon et de Lange

= Megalaria crispisulcans =

Species of lichen

Megalaria crispisulcans is a species of isidiate lichen in the family Ramalinaceae. Found in New Zealand, it was formally described as a new species in 2023. The lichen typically grows on the bark of māhoe and mamangi trees, and has also been found growing on rocks.

== Taxonomy ==
The species was described in 2023 by Andrew J. Marshall, Peter de Lange and Dan Blanchon. The type specimen was collected from Hautu Marama / Hodge's Basin, a pocket of remnant coastal forest within Woodhill Forest in Auckland, New Zealand, from the bark of Melicytus ramiflorus. The holotype is kept at the herbarium of Unitec Institute of Technology in Mount Albert. The species epithet, crispisulcans, is a word formed the Latin words 'crispus' (uldulating) and 'sulcatus' (grooved), referring to the crinkled outer rim of often seen in the species.

The species was first identified during surveys conducted in 2020 in the Auckland Region, during which a specimens were identified in the Waitākere Ranges area, which were similar in appearance to Megalaria orokonuiana, but had morphological differences, such as a marginal prothallus and longer isidia.

Phylogenetic analysis indicates the species is closely related to Megalaria orokonuiana, and more distantly related to Megalaria grossa and Megalaria laureri.

== Description ==
Megalaria crispisulcans can be distinguished from other Megalaria species in New Zealand by the presence of a white prothallus which extends 5 mm (0.20 in) or more from the thallus, a bright green isidiate thallus (when freshly sampled), and by having a more prominent coralloid isidia, compared to the granular isidia of Megalaria orokonuiana.

== Distribution and habitat ==
Megalaria crispisulcans is endemic to New Zealand. While most specimens have been collected from the Waitākere Ranges and Woodhill Forest, it is known to occur in Northland, the Bay of Plenty, the Kawhia Harbour and the Chatham Islands, and likely occurs elsewhere in New Zealand.

Megalaria crispisulcans is both corticolous (growing on bark) and occasionally saxicolous (growing on rock). It often grows in partially shaded sites, often the bark of māhoe and mamangi, but has also been found growing on nīkau, West Coast kōwhai and Melicytus chathamicus, often in association with Porina exocha, Pseudocyphellaria rufovirescens and Sticta lacera. The species has been observed growing on both conglomerate and andesite rock.
