= Buellia lordhowensis =

Scientific classification
- Kingdom: Fungi
- Division: Ascomycota
- Class: Lecanoromycetes
- Order: Caliciales
- Family: Caliciaceae
- Genus: Buellia
- Species: B. lordhowensis

Binomial name
- Buellia lordhowensis Elix (2020)
- Holotype site: Rocky Run Creek, Lord Howe Island

Species of lichen

Buellia lordhowensis is a little-known saxicolous (rock-dwelling), crustose lichen species in the family Caliciaceae, first described in 2020. It is only known to occur on Lord Howe Island, Australia.

== Taxonomy ==
The lichen was formally described in 2020 by the Australian lichenologist John Elix. It is named after its type locality, Lord Howe Island in New South Wales.

== Description ==
Buellia lordhowensis is characterised by a crust-like body (thallus) that varies in texture from cracked (rimose) to a cracked-tile appearance (rimose-areolate), spreading up to 55 mm wide. The individual tile-like segments, called areoles, are either tightly clustered or spread out, ranging in size from 0.2 to 0.8 mm, with an irregular, angular, and flat shape. The surface of the thallus is a pale yellow-grey, with a dull appearance. It has a well-defined, black border (prothallus) around the edges and between the areoles. The inner layer of the thallus (the medulla) is white and lacks calcium oxalate, as it does not react to sulphuric acid and iodine tests. The cells of the green algae living in symbiosis with the fungus (photobiont cells) are relatively small, measuring 6–11 μm in diameter.

The reproductive structures of the lichen, known as apothecia, are tiny (0.1–0.25 mm wide), lecideine in form, and appear level with or immersed in the thallus. These structures have a black, non-powdery (epruinose), and either flat or slightly sunken disc. The rim surrounding the disc (the proper exciple) is initially raised above the disc but becomes level with it over time. This rim has an outer zone that is aeruginose-black, measuring 25–35 μm thick, while the layer just above the spore-producing tissue (epihymenium) is dark brown to bluish-green. The supporting tissue below the spore-producing tissue (hypothecium) is brown to dark brown and 70–80 μm thick. The actual spore-producing layer (hymenium) is 45–55 μm thick, clear, and not interspersed with particles; the layer beneath it (subhymenium) is pale brown and 10–15 μm thick. The slender, branching structures (paraphyses) within the hymenium are 1.5–2 μm wide, with aeruginose-brown capped tips. The spore-producing sacs (asci) are typically of the Bacidia type, usually containing eight spores. The spores themselves are of the Buellia type, brown, ellipsoid, and measure 9–13 by 5–8 μm. Older spores have a constriction at the division, and their outer walls are finely wrinkled (microrugulate). The pycnidia, another type of reproductive structure, are brown to black and immersed. The rod-shaped spores (conidia) produced in these structures measure 6–9 by 0.7–1 μm. Chemically, the medulla of the lichen contains 4,5-dichlorolichexanthone as its major component.

Buellia lordhowensis is similar to Buellia lichexanthonica. It differs, however, by having immersed apothecia and a prominent black prothallus.

== Habitat and distribution ==
Buellia lordhowensis is known to occur only at its original collection site. It was found on basalt rocks in a lowland forest beside a rocky stream on Lord Howe Island. Associated lichens occurring in the same habitat included Buellia homophylia, Megalaria cf. laureri, Parmotrema reticulatum, and Xanthoparmelia thamnoides.
