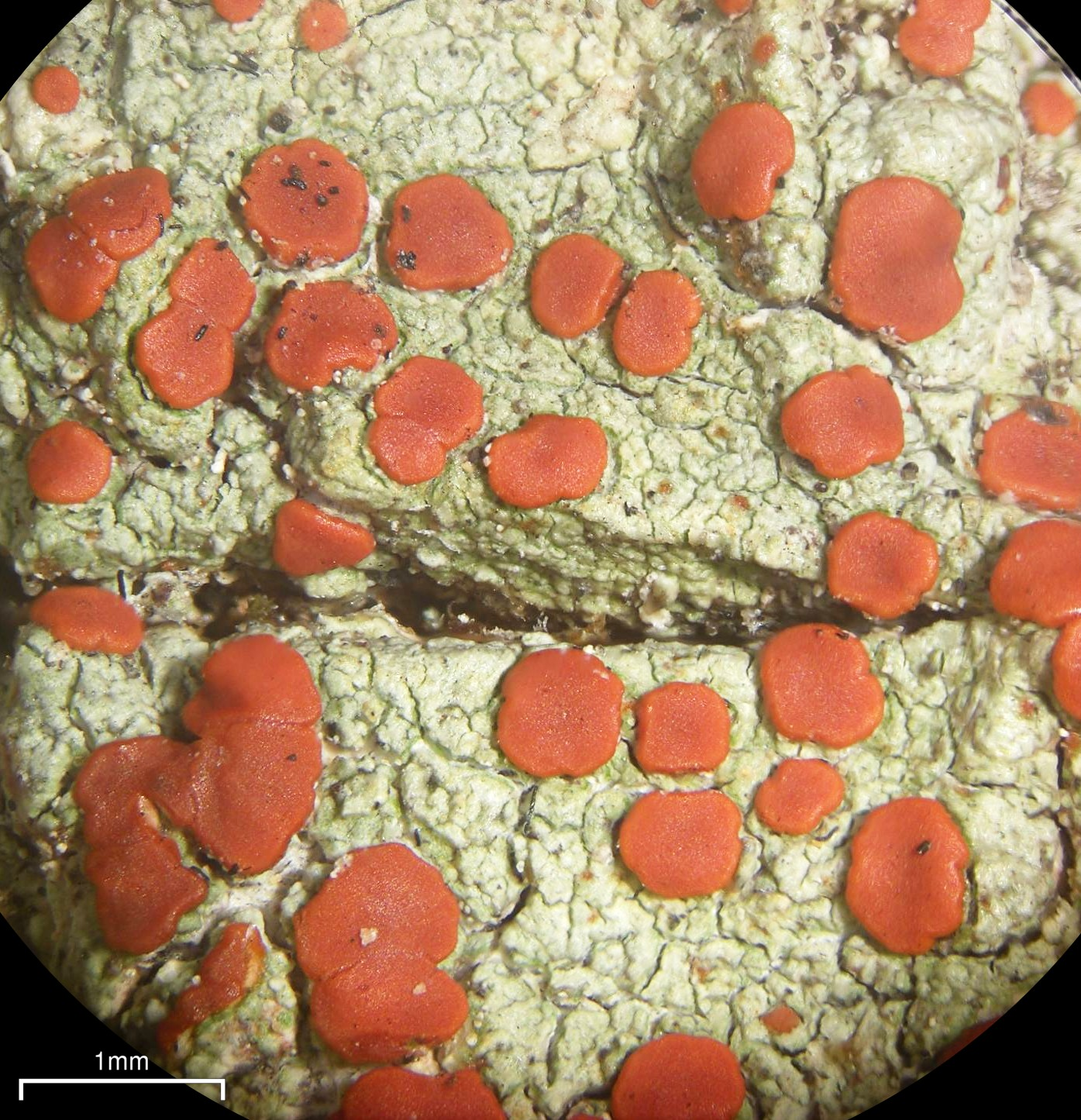
- Ramboldia russula

Scientific classification
- Kingdom: Fungi
- Division: Ascomycota
- Class: Lecanoromycetes
- Order: Lecanorales
- Family: Ramboldiaceae; S.Stenroos, Miądl. & Lutzoni (2014)
- Genus: Ramboldia; Kantvilas & Elix (1994)

Type species
- Ramboldia stuartii (Hampe) Kantvilas & Elix (1994)

= Ramboldia =

Genus of lichen-forming fungi

Ramboldia is a genus of lichen-forming fungi in the family Ramboldiaceae. The genus was established in 1994 to accommodate several Australasian lichens that form crusts on wood, bark, and rock surfaces, and it was named in honour of the German mycologist Gerhard Rambold. These lichens are characterised by their small, disc-shaped fruiting bodies and their chemical composition, which includes β-orcinol derivatives and sometimes anthraquinones, though they lack the distinctive crimson reaction found in the related genus Pyrrhospora. The genus contains about 40 species found worldwide, ranging in colour from pale grey to nearly black.

== Taxonomy ==
Ramboldia was erected in 1994, when Gintaras Kantvilas and John Elix showed that several Australasian Lecidea-like wood-inhabiting lichens did not fit any recognised genus of the Lecanoraceae and therefore warranted a new taxon. In their protologue they noted morphological affinities with Pyrrhospora but emphasised the complete absence of the KOH-reactive crimson or purple anthraquinones that characterise that genus, thus justifying separation. The authors placed five species in Ramboldia at inception—lignicolous R. stuartii (designated type) and R. subnexa, corticolous R. brunneocarpa, and the rock-dwelling pair R. petraeoides and R. plicatula. The genus name honours the German mycologist Gerhard Walter Rambold for his contributions to the study of Australasian lecideoid lichens.

The genus was emended in 2008 by the inclusion of Pyrrhospora species containing the anthraquinone compound russulone in their apothecia and having a prosoplectenchymatous exciple. The family Ramboldiaceae was erected in 2014 to contain the genus.

== Description ==
Ramboldia grows as a crust that lies flat against its substrate. The thallus can be a patchwork of tiny, tile-like areoles, a more diffuse film (effuse), or so slight that it is barely visible. Its colour varies from pale grey through reddish brown to almost black. As in many lichens, the photosynthetic partner (photobiont) is a single-celled green alga of the trebouxioid type, which supplies carbohydrates to the fungal host.

The sexual fruiting bodies are small, light tan to black discs (apothecia). Because they are lecideine, the rim is formed entirely by fungal tissue—the surrounding lichen crust does not contribute a thallus-derived margin. When young, each disc is encircled by a persistent wall (true exciple) made of tightly glued, radiating hyphae; in very mature apothecia this wall may erode and disappear flush with the disc surface. Beneath the hymenium the supporting tissue (hypothecium) is colourless, while the hymenium itself is threaded with sparsely branched paraphyses whose tips may swell or darken. The asci are of the Lecanora type and each produces eight narrowly ellipsoidal to rod-shaped ascospores that remain single-celled and lack an outer gelatinous coat. Asexual propagation takes place in immersed pycnidia, minute flask-like structures that release thread-like conidia.

Chemical analyses show that most species contain β-orcinol derivatives, and some also produce anthraquinones, although the apothecia never give the crimson or purple potassium hydroxide (K+) reaction typical of the related genus Pyrrhospora. Superficially, Ramboldia can resemble Carbonea, Lecidella, Miriquidica and members of the Lecanora symmicta group, but it differs from each in the microscopic architecture of its exciple or asci.

== Species ==
As of July 2025, Species Fungorum (in the Catalogue of Life) accept 40 species of Ramalina.

- Ramboldia amagiensis (Räsänen) Kalb, Lumbsch & Elix (2008)
- Ramboldia amarkantakana Upreti & Nayaka (2009)
- Ramboldia arandensis (Elix) Kalb, Lumbsch & Elix (2008)
- Ramboldia atromarginata Kantvilas (2016)
- Ramboldia aurantiaca (Aptroot & Diederich) Kalb, Lumbsch & Elix (2008)
- Ramboldia aurea (Kalb & Elix) Kalb, Lumbsch & Elix (2008)
- Ramboldia badia Aptroot (2022) – Brazil
- Ramboldia blastidiata Kantvilas & Elix (2007)
- Ramboldia blochiana Lendemer & R.C.Harris (2011) – North America, Central America, South America, West Indies
- Ramboldia brunneocarpa Kantvilas & Elix (1994)
- Ramboldia buleensis Elix & P.M.McCarthy (2017)
- Ramboldia bullata (Kalb & Elix) Kalb, Lumbsch & Elix (2008)
- Ramboldia canadensis G.Thor & T.Sprib. (2024)
- Ramboldia cinnabarina (Sommerf.) Kalb, Lumbsch & Elix (2008)
- Ramboldia crassithallina Kalb (2001)
- Ramboldia curvispora P.M.McCarthy & Elix (2017)
- Ramboldia elabens (Fr.) Kantvilas & Elix (2007)
- Ramboldia farinosa Kalb (2004)
- Ramboldia gowardiana (T.Sprib. & M.Hauck) Kalb, Lumbsch & Elix (2008)
- Ramboldia greeniana Kantvilas (2016)
- Ramboldia griseococcinea (Nyl.) Kalb, Lumbsch & Elix (2008)
- Ramboldia haematites (Fée) Kalb, Lumbsch & Elix (2008)
- Ramboldia heterocarpa (Fée) Kalb, Lumbsch & Elix (2008)
- Ramboldia insidiosa (Th.Fr.) Hafellner (1995)
- Ramboldia laeta (Stirt.) Kalb, Lumbsch & Elix (2008)
- Ramboldia lusitanica (Räsänen) Kalb, Lumbsch & Elix (2008)
- Ramboldia manipurensis (Kr.P.Singh) Kalb, Lumbsch & Elix (2008)
- Ramboldia neolaeta Kalb & Elix (2008)
- Ramboldia oxalifera P.M.McCarthy & Elix (2018)
- Ramboldia petraeoides (Nyl. ex C.Bab. & Mitt.) Kantvilas & Elix (1994)
- Ramboldia plicatula (Müll.Arg.) Kantvilas & Elix (1994)
- Ramboldia quaesitica Elix & Kalb (2008)
- Ramboldia russula (Ach.) Kalb, Lumbsch & Elix (2008)
- Ramboldia sanguinolenta (Kremp.) Kalb, Lumbsch & Elix (2008)
- Ramboldia siamensis Buaruang, Elix & Kalb (2009)
- Ramboldia sorediata Kalb (2001)
- Ramboldia stuartii (Hampe) Kantvilas & Elix (1994)
- Ramboldia subcinnabarina (Tønsberg) Kalb, Lumbsch & Elix (2008)
- Ramboldia subnexa (Stirt.) Kantvilas & Elix (1994)
- Ramboldia subplicatula Elix & P.M.McCarthy (2017)
