= Fellhanera silhouettae =

Scientific classification
- Kingdom: Fungi
- Division: Ascomycota
- Class: Lecanoromycetes
- Order: Lecanorales
- Family: Ectolechiaceae
- Genus: Fellhanera
- Species: F. silhouettae

Binomial name
- Fellhanera silhouettae Aptroot & Seaward (2004)

Species of lichen-forming fungus

Fellhanera silhouettae is a species of crustose lichen in the family Ectolechiaceae. It was described in 2004 from the granitic island of Silhouette in the Seychelles. It forms a thin, granular green thallus on tree bark and occasionally over mosses and is recognised by its minute urn-shaped, orange-brown fruit-bodies, a hypothecium that flashes deep crimson when a drop of potassium hydroxide solution is applied, and elongate, five- to six-septate spores. The species appears to be confined to the mid-elevation evergreen forests of Silhouette Island, and may well be endemic there.

== Taxonomy ==
Fellhanera silhouettae was formally described in 2004 by André Aptroot and Mark Seaward in their paper describing four lichens new to science from the Seychelles. The holotype was collected at 220 m elevation along the trail to Jardin Marron on Silhouette Island, where it grew at the base of a living Tabebuia tree. The epithet silhouettae refers to the type locality. Although pycnidia have not been observed, the combination of a Byssoloma-type ascus structure and a non-aeruginous apothecial base places the species unambiguously in Fellhanera, separating it from superficially similar members of Byssoloma and Fellhaneropsis. Among other in the genus, it most closely resembles the foliicolous F. subfuscatula but differs in its deeper orange apothecia, red-reacting hypothecium and slightly larger, often clavate (club-shaped) ascospores.

== Description ==
The thallus forms a continuous, dull grey-green film that looks powdery to the naked eye because it is composed of tiny, meal-like granules (a texture call farinose). No cortex or distinct margin is present, and the lichen merges imperceptibly with the substrate. The photobiont is a green alga that is not apparent without microscopy.

Apothecia (fruiting bodies) are scattered, round and distinctly urn-shaped: their bases pinch inwards where they meet the thallus, giving each fruit-body the look of a tiny cup with a raised rim. Young discs are flat and pale, but mature ones become slightly convex and deepen to orange-brown while the rim remains a shade lighter. Diameters range from 0.35 to 0.50 mm (rarely to 0.8 mm) and heights from 0.1 to 0.5 mm. A thin pale-brown epihymenium overlies a clear hymenium about 70 micrometres (μm) tall. Slender, flexuous paraphyses branch freely; their tips broaden to about 4 μm, giving extra support to the hymenium. The excipulum consists of radiating, intertwined hyphae, while the hypothecium beneath is a rich orange-brown that instantly turns vivid red in a potassium hydroxide spot-test.

Each cylindrical-clavate ascus typically holds six spores (occasionally four or eight). The spores are elongate-clavate, tapering at either end, with five (sometimes six) internal cross-walls (septa). They measure 20–25 × 4–5 μm and show a slight waist at each septum. No asexual propagules or conidiomata have been observed to occur in this species.

== Habitat and distribution ==
The species is known only from the mid-elevation evergreen forests of Silhouette Island, one of the granitic inner islands of the Seychelles archipelago. There it colonises the bark of hardwoods such as Tabebuia and, less often, the surface of damp moss mats in shaded but well-ventilated sites around 200 m elevation. The age and isolation of Silhouette's biota led its discoverers to suggest that F. silhouettae may be endemic to the island, although further surveys of neighbouring islands are needed to confirm this. F. silhouettae is one of nine Fellhanera species that has been documented in the Seychelles Group.
