= Ramboldia curvispora =

Scientific classification
- Kingdom: Fungi
- Division: Ascomycota
- Class: Lecanoromycetes
- Order: Lecanorales
- Family: Ramboldiaceae
- Genus: Ramboldia
- Species: R. curvispora

Binomial name
- Ramboldia curvispora P.M.McCarthy & Elix (2017)

Species of lichen

Ramboldia curvispora is a species of crustose lichen in the family Ramboldiaceae. Found in Australia, it was described as a new species in 2017 by lichenologists John Elix and Patrick McCarthy. The specific epithet refers to its characteristic curved ascospores. The lichen is only known to occur on the South Coast of New South Wales, where it grows on both hard and soft siliceous rocks.

== Taxonomy ==
Ramboldia curvispora was described as a new species in 2017 by Patrick McCarthy and John Elix in their survey of coastal lichens from southern New South Wales. The epithet curvispora refers to the distinctive, gently curved ascospores that separate it from morphologically similar species in the genus.

Within Ramboldia, the species is most easily confused with Ramboldia blastidiata. However, R. curvispora lacks any detectable lichen products, whereas R. blastidiata contains norstictic acid. In addition, the blastidia—tiny, bud-like propagules used for asexual reproduction—stay dark and firmly attached in R. curvispora instead of whitening, abrading and turning into powdery sorediate patches as in R. blastidiata. Its spores are also longer (10–17 μm versus 8.5–12 μm) and usually bent rather than straight. Collectively, these anatomical, chemical and spore shape differences justify its recognition as a distinct taxon.

== Description ==
The lichen forms a grey-green to yellow-olive crustose thallus—that is, a thin crust tightly attached to the rock surface—usually 0.15–0.80 mm thick and up to about 10 cm wide. Ageing cracks divide the surface into tiny, angular areoles (islet-like pieces) 0.2–1.2 mm across. These may become slightly domed or even puff up into low mounds. The upper surface is often roughened by numerous dark blastidia (50–70 μm), which are globe-to-irregularly shaped outgrowths that can break free and start new colonies. A true protective cortex is patchy or absent, so the green algal layer (made of round chlorococcoid cells 10–16 μm wide) lies just beneath a thin skin of fungal tissue. No calcium-oxalate crystals are present in the medulla, and chemical spot tests are negative.

Fruit-bodies (apothecia) are plentiful. Each is initially sunk into the crust but soon sits flush with, or slightly above, the surface; they range from 0.21 to 0.74 mm across and have a dusky brown-black, glossy disc. The margin is the same colour as the disc and stays intact for most of the life of the apothecium. Internally, a clear to faintly brownish excipulum (the rim of intertwined hyphae) surrounds the hymenium. A thin blue-green layer at the top of the hymenium reacts blue in potassium hydroxide solution (K) and purple in nitric acid. The hymenium itself is 45–60 μm tall. Ascospores are produced eight per ascus; they are colourless, narrowly ellipsoid, usually bent, sometimes with a faint internal partition, and measure 10–17 × 3.5–5.5 μm. Separate flask-shaped pycnidia generate long, thread-like conidia 7–10 × 0.5–1 μm that serve as another asexual dispersal method.

== Habitat and distribution ==
Ramboldia curvispora is an exclusively saxicolous (rock-dwelling) species restricted, so far, to the south-eastern seaboard of Australia. It colonises hard or soft siliceous rocks—including vertical shale and sandstone cliffs—directly on or just above the high-tide zone, where it receives frequent sea spray and occasional soil runoff. At some coastal sites, particularly the shaded shale walls of Callala Bay and nearby localities, it forms dense mosaics together with the equally spray-tolerant Fellhanera robusta and other maritime crusts, including Porpidia littoralis, which is only known to occur at this site.

Records span a roughly 300-kilometre stretch of the New South Wales coast (Tomakin, Crookhaven Heads, Gerringong and Jervis Bay) and extend inland to the sandstone escarpments of Morton National Park. The distribution suggests a preference for the humid, temperate climate of the Illawarra–South Coast region, but further collecting may reveal a wider range along comparable seaside cliffs and sheltered tableland outcrops.
