= Fellhaneropsis =

Scientific classification
- Kingdom: Fungi
- Division: Ascomycota
- Class: Lecanoromycetes
- Order: Lecanorales
- Family: Ectolechiaceae
- Genus: Fellhaneropsis; Sérus. & Coppins (1996)

Type species
- Fellhaneropsis myrtillicola (Erichsen) Sérus. & Coppins (1996)

Genus of lichen-forming fungi

Fellhaneropsis is a genus of lichen-forming fungi in the family Ectolechiaceae. The genus comprises 11 accepted species as of 2025. These inconspicuous lichens form extremely thin, smooth to powdery films that spread over bark, leaves, or other plant surfaces, and unlike their close relatives in Fellhanera, they produce no detectable lichen products.

== Taxonomy ==
Fellhaneropsis was circumscribed by Emmanuël Sérusiaux and Brian John Coppins in 1996, in a study of foliicolous (leaf-dwelling) lichens from Madeira. They introduced the genus to accommodate two species that had previously been placed in Bacidia: B. myrtillicola and B vezdae. Of these, F. myrtillicola was selected as the type species. In the original treatment, the authors regarded the new genus as closely allied to Fellhanera, but concluded that these species were distinct enough to justify separation at genus level.

Sérusiaux and Coppins based that decision on a combination of microscopic characters. They described Fellhaneropsis as having an extremely thin, crust-like thallus without a cortex, small apothecia constricted at the base, and a thin but distinct tissue around the apothecium (the excipulum) made of elliptical to polyhedral cells arranged in upright rows rather than the more typical paraplectenchymatous tissue seen in Fellhanera. They also noted Byssoloma-type asci, long narrow ascospores divided by transverse septa, and distinctive pycnidia that produce long, thread-like, sigmoid conidia; in F. myrtillicola, a second type of shorter, rod-shaped (bacilliform) conidium is also present.

The authors regarded those long threadlike (filiform) conidia as especially diagnostic, and suggested that the way the pycnidia appear to develop from spore-producing apothecia was a singular feature among the lichenized fungi known to them. On that basis, they treated Fellhaneropsis as a distinct genus rather than as part of Fellhanera sensu stricto, whose species have a typically paraplectenchymatous excipulum and bacilliform, ellipsoid, or pear-shaped conidia. The genus was named in honour of the Austrian lichenologist Josef Hafellner.

== Description ==
Fellhaneropsis species form an extremely thin, crust-like thallus that sits flush against the substrate and lacks any protective outer skin (cortex). The surface is usually smooth to slightly powdery and varies from whitish to dull grey-green, spreading in inconspicuous films over bark, leaves or other plant material. The internal photobiont partner is a simple chlorococcoid alga—tiny, spherical cells 5–12 μm in diameter—that are evenly dispersed through the fungal tissue. Because there is no distinct hypothallus (the dark border seen in some crusts), colonies merge almost imperceptibly into the underlying surface.

Sexual reproduction occurs in small, stalkless apothecia measuring 0.1–0.4 mm across. Each fruit body is pinched in at the base and loses its thin rim early, leaving a flat to slightly convex disc. The disc's wall, or true exciple, is a delicate layer of rounded to polyhedral cells arranged more or less upright rather than in the densely interwoven 'brickwork' typical of many lichens. Inside, colourless paraphyses branch and link together, surrounding club-shaped asci that contain eight ascospores. Both the ascus tip and its gelatinous outer coat stain blue in iodine—an amyloid reaction. The spores are long and needle-to-spindle-shaped, divided by three to seven cross-walls, and sometimes wrapped in a faint, jelly-like sheath.

Asexual reproduction takes place in minute pycnidia sunk into the thallus. These flask-shaped structures are ringed by upright, fringe-like hyphae around the pore (ostiole) and usually release one type of conidium: a very slender, thread-like spore with no internal walls. In F. myrtillicola a second, shorter bacilliform conidium is also produced. No secondary lichen substances have so far been detected in the genus, setting Fellhaneropsis apart from its chemically positive relative Fellhanera.

== Species ==
As of December 2025, Species Fungorum (in the Catalogue of Life) accept 11 species of Fellhaneropsis.

- Fellhaneropsis almquistiorum S.Ekman (2015)
- Fellhaneropsis australiana Lücking (2001) – Australia
- Fellhaneropsis humicola P.M.McCarthy (2021) – Australia
- Fellhaneropsis kurokawana G.Thor, Lücking & Tat.Matsumoto (2000) – Japan
- Fellhaneropsis macrocarpa P.M.McCarthy, Elix & Kantvilas (2017) – Australia
- Fellhaneropsis myrtillicola (Erichsen) Sérus. & Coppins (1996)
- Fellhaneropsis pallidonigrans (Müll.Arg.) Kantvilas & Lücking (2009)
- Fellhaneropsis rhododendri Aptroot (2012) – Europe
- Fellhaneropsis sigmoidea W.C.Wang & J.C.Wei (2025) – China
- Fellhaneropsis subantarctica Øvstedal (2006)
- Fellhaneropsis tasmanica P.M.McCarthy, Kantvilas & Elix (2017) – Australia
- Fellhaneropsis vezdae (Coppins & P.James) Sérus. & Coppins (1996)
