= Fellhanera baeomycoides =

Scientific classification
- Kingdom: Fungi
- Division: Ascomycota
- Class: Lecanoromycetes
- Order: Lecanorales
- Family: Ectolechiaceae
- Genus: Fellhanera
- Species: F. baeomycoides

Binomial name
- Fellhanera baeomycoides M.Cáceres & Aptroot (2017)

Species of lichen-forming fungus

Fellhanera baeomycoides is a species of terricolous (ground-dwelling) lichen in the family Ectolechiaceae. Found in Brazil, it was formally described as a new species in 2017 by the lichenologists Marcela Eugenia da Silva Cáceres and André Aptroot. The type specimen was collected by the authors along a trail near a field station in the Adolfo Ducke Forest Reserve (Manaus); here it was found growing on the ground in an open area of an old-growth rainforest. The lichen has a granular, grayish-green thallus that lacks a cortex and a prothallus. The species epithet refers to the way the stipitate apothecia resemble those in genus Baeomyces.
