= Ramboldia blochiana =

Scientific classification
- Kingdom: Fungi
- Division: Ascomycota
- Class: Lecanoromycetes
- Order: Lecanorales
- Family: Ramboldiaceae
- Genus: Ramboldia
- Species: R. blochiana

Binomial name
- Ramboldia blochiana Lendemer & R.C.Harris (2011)

Species of lichen

Ramboldia blochiana is a species of corticolous (bark-dwelling), crustose lichen in the family Ramboldiaceae. The species is characterized by a sorediate thallus and shares chemical and morphological characteristics with the widespread Ramboldia russula, but it also possesses distinct chemical components and a unique geographical distribution. Though it is found across tropical and subtropical regions of the New World on various substrates, its distribution might be wider than currently known due to collection biases against sterile, asexually reproducing crustose lichens.

== Taxonomy ==
The species Ramboldia blochiana was defined and introduced to the scientific world in 2011 by lichenologists James Lendemer and Richard C. Harris. The type specimen was found in Bahia, Brazil, specifically on the lower slopes of Pico das Almas. The species epithet, blochiana, is a tribute to Ellen D. Bloch, the collections manager at the cryptogamic herbarium of the New York Botanical Garden.

== Description ==
Ramboldia blochiana features a superficial thallus that ranges in color from creamy white to dark gray and can be thin and continuous or thicker with irregular areoles. This thallus, unique among its counterparts, is sorediate, with soredia stemming from pustular soralia. The species' apothecia are biatorine and bright red, becoming irregular in shape as they mature. Its ascospores are hyaline, narrowly ellipsoid, and non-halonate. Lichexanthone, fumarprotocetraric acid, secalonic acid, and russulone are chemical substances present in this lichen species.

Ramboldia blochiana is considered the sorediate counterpart to Ramboldia russula, sharing the same chemistry and apothecial morphology. There are only three known members of the Ramboldia russula group that produce asexual propagules, R. arandensis, R. cinnabarina, and R. subcinnabarina. However, Ramboldia blochiana stands apart from these species by its unique chemical composition, and geographical distribution.

== Habitat and distribution ==
This lichen species grows on a diverse range of corticolous substrates including Pinus, Vellozia, Vaccinium, and wood. It is dispersed across the tropical and subtropical regions of the New World, with known collections in Brazil, Venezuela, the Dominican Republic, Haiti, southeastern Coastal Plain and southern Appalachian Mountains in the US, and Mexico. The authors suggest that the actual distribution of Ramboldia blochiana may be broader, as sterile asexually reproducing crustose lichens often face collection bias and thus there is often insufficient data to determine their full range.
