= Fellhanera ivoriensis =

Scientific classification
- Kingdom: Fungi
- Division: Ascomycota
- Class: Lecanoromycetes
- Order: Lecanorales
- Family: Ectolechiaceae
- Genus: Fellhanera
- Species: F. ivoriensis

Binomial name
- Fellhanera ivoriensis Lücking & R.Sant. (2001)

Species of lichen-forming fungus

Fellhanera ivoriensis is a species of foliicolous (leaf-dwelling) lichen. First described in 2001, this species is distinguished from its relatives in the Fellhanera by its soredia-covered thallus and the characteristics of its apothecia (fruiting bodies). It is native to the Ivory Coast in West Africa.

== Taxonomy ==
The lichen was formally described in 2001 by the lichenologists Robert Lücking and Rolf Santesson. The type specimen of Fellhanera ivoriensis was collected in the Ivory Coast, specifically in the Adiopodoume region, 17 km (11 mi) west of Abidjan at the IDERT Institute within a rainforest ecosystem.

== Description ==
The thallus of Fellhanera ivoriensis is foliicolous, presenting as a continuous, smooth to very minutely farinose surface (as if covered with a white, mealy powder). It has pale greenish to brownish grey colouration with scattered to confluent soralia. Initially, these soralia are rounded, measuring 0.1–0.3 mm in diameter, but later become irregularly confluent and very pale yellowish-green. The soredia are approximately 15–20 μm in diameter, consisting of algal cells about 3–4 μm in diameter and a paraplectenchymatous hyphal cortex that is 1–3 μm thick. The photobiont is a green algal species of Chlorococcaceae, with cells measuring 4–7 μm in diameter.

The apothecia (fruiting bodies) of Fellhanera ivoriensis are sessile with a constricted base, rounded, and measure 0.2–0.4 mm in diameter. The disc is flat to slightly convex, ranging in colour from brown to greyish brown, sometimes with an orange tinge, and has a non-prominent, chamois-coloured margin. The excipulum is paraplectenchymatous, 20–35 μm thick, and colourless, while the hypothecium in darker apothecia is dark brown to blackish brown, measuring 15–20 μm in height. The hymenium is 40–50 μm high and colourless. Paraphyses are 1 μm thick, branching, and anastomosing. Asci (spore-bearing cells) are clavate, 35–45 by 8–10 μm, with eight ascospores per ascus. These ascospores are oblong to ellipsoid, contain three septate, are colourless, and measure 14–18 by 3–4 μm.

Pycnidia in Fellhanera ivoriensis are wart- to barrel-shaped, 0.1–0.15 mm in diameter, and chamois-coloured with a wide ostiole. The conidia are narrowly ellipsoid to bacillar, non-septate, colourless, and measure 5–6 by 1.0–1.2 μm.

== Similar species ==
Fellhanera ivoriensis is part of the genus Fellhanera that includes species with sorediate thalli. It is distinguished from F. viridi by its darker apothecia with a dark brown hypothecium and the paler thallus and soralia. Fellhanera ivoriensis is similar to F. rhapidophylli but can be identified by its ellipsoid bacillar conidia. Other species with similar dark apothecia, such as F. lambinonii, F. seroexspectata, and F. muhlei, differ in either their apothecial discs or thallus and soralia characteristics.
