= Hafellia alisioae =

Scientific classification
- Kingdom: Fungi
- Division: Ascomycota
- Class: Lecanoromycetes
- Order: Caliciales
- Family: Caliciaceae
- Genus: Hafellia
- Species: H. alisioae

Binomial name
- Hafellia alisioae Etayo & Marbach (2003)

Synonyms
- Buellia alisioae (Etayo & Marbach) Giralt & van den Boom (2011)

Species of lichen

Hafellia alisioae is a rare species of corticolous (bark-dwelling), crustose lichen in the family Caliciaceae. Found in the Canary Islands, it was formally described as a new species in 2003 by Javier Etayo and Bernhard Marbach. The species epithet alisioae is derived from alisios, the Spanish word for the moisture-laden Atlantic winds that blow from the northeast, bringing high humidity and rain to exposed coasts with biodiverse lichen growth. Mireia Giralt and Pieter P.G. van den Boom proposed to transfer the taxon to the genus Buellia in 2011.

== Description ==
The thallus of Hafellia alisioae is crustose, meaning it forms a crust-like layer that adheres closely to the substrate. It can appear either smooth and continuous or granular with a rough surface. The thallus is relatively thin, measuring between 0.05 and 0.15 micrometres (μm), and its colour ranges from cream-white to ochraceous. Beneath the thallus is a thin, black layer called the hypothallus.

The apothecia (fruiting bodies) are black and range from 0.25 to 0.90 mm in diameter. They can be rounded or irregular in shape. Initially, they are flat with a slightly raised margin that is the same colour as the apothecia, but they become convex as they mature and lose the clear margin. The exciple, a rim surrounding the apothecia, is 30 to 50 μm broad and brown or greenish-brown, with a less dark zone towards the centre. It is composed of cells with small lumina and thick brown walls that merge with the underlying hypothallus.

The hymenium, which is the fertile spore-bearing layer of the apothecia, measures between 100 and 110 μm thick and contains many oil droplets, and has a hyaline (translucent) or slightly greenish appearance. The top layer of the hymenium, the epihymenium, is brown to olive-brown due to the colour of the paraphysis tips. Paraphyses are sterile, thread-like filaments among the asci, measuring 1.5 to 2.0 μm thick, with branched ends and heads that are 3 to 4 μm wide containing intracellular pigment.

The asci, which are the sac-like structures containing spores, typically hold eight spores each. The ascospores are gray-brown, straight to slightly curved, and measure between 20 and 30 μm in length and 8 to 11 μm in width. They have weak to moderate thickenings near the tips and septa (partitions between cells), with almost hyaline tips and smooth surfaces. Conidiomata, structures that produce asexual spores, have an oblong to ellipsoid shape and measure 4–6 by 1–1.5 μm.

The thallus reacts with potassium hydroxide solution (K) by turning red due to the presence of norstictic acid. The apothecia contain two types of pigments: a brown pigment that does not react with potassium hydroxide (K–) or nitric acid (N–), and an olive-green pigment that intensifies with potassium hydroxide (K+) but does not react with nitric acid (N–).

== Habitat and distribution ==
Hafellia alisioe is known exclusively from its type locality, an exposed cliff rich in lichen flora and covered by small, leaning shrubs. It grows abundantly near the ground on thin twigs measuring 0.5–1.0 cm in diameter. This location also supports other rare, fruticose lichens, including several endemic species of Ramalina, Teloschistes flavicans, and the endangered Tomabea scutellifera. Other crustose lichens that commonly occur along H. alisioe include Caloplaca aegatica (possibly Caloplaca aurantellina), Chrysothrix candelaris, Hafellia gomerana, Lepraria species, Pertusaria albescens, and Pertusaria velata.
