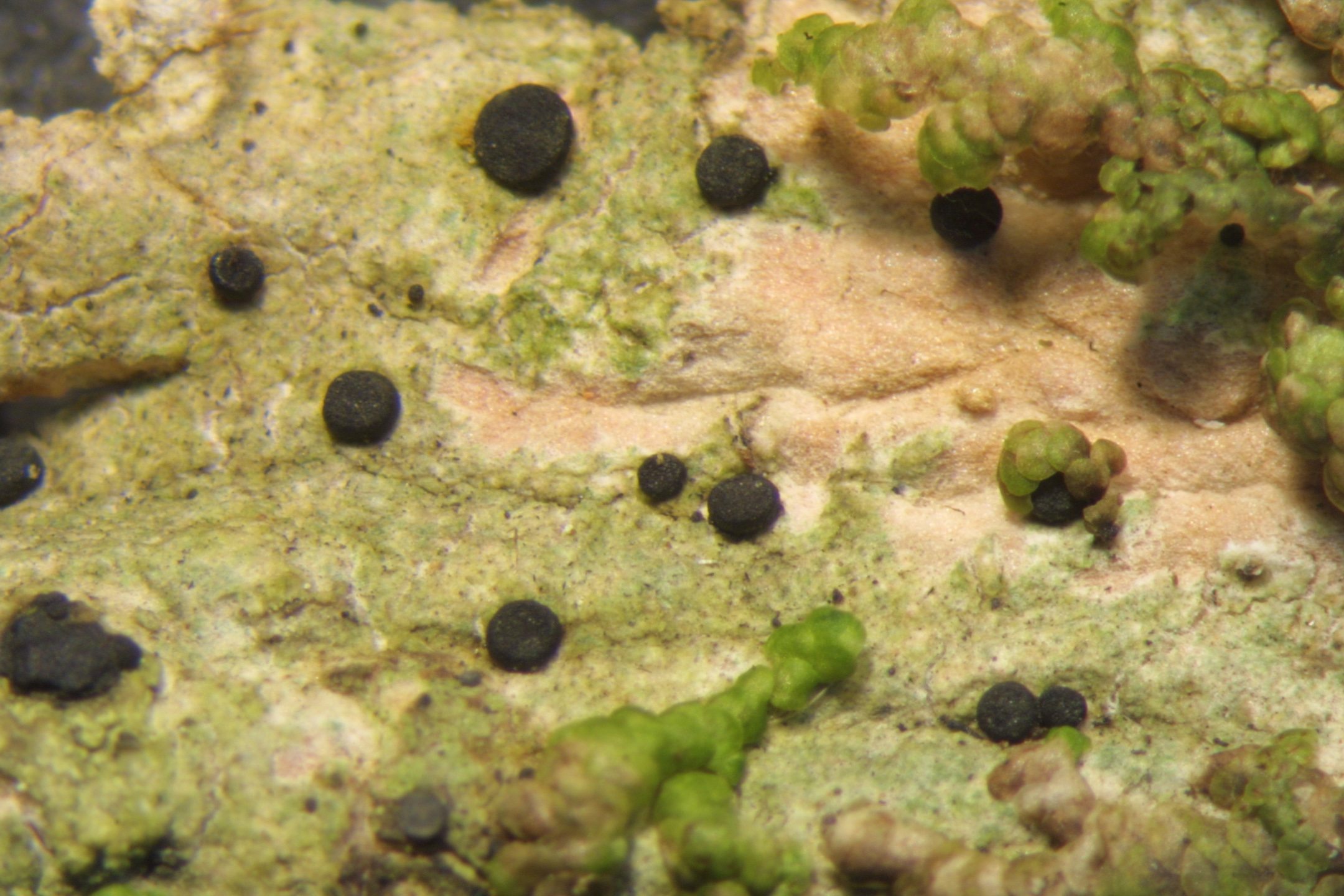
- Megalaria grossa

Scientific classification
- Kingdom: Fungi
- Division: Ascomycota
- Class: Lecanoromycetes
- Order: Lecanorales
- Family: Ramalinaceae
- Genus: Megalaria; Hafellner (1984)

Type species
- Megalaria grossa (Pers. ex Nyl.) Hafellner (1984)

Synonyms
- Catillochroma Kalb (2007)

= Megalaria =

Genus of lichen-forming fungi

Megalaria is a genus of lichen-forming fungi in the family Ramalinaceae. It contains 46 species of crustose lichens, the majority of which grow on bark. The genus was established in 1984 and has since grown to include species from diverse regions ranging from subantarctic islands to tropical forests. Most Megalaria species are recognised by their large, black fruiting bodies that sit directly on the lichen's surface, along with their thick-walled ascospores that are divided by a single internal partition. The genus primarily colonises tree bark in moist, shaded habitats, though some species also grow on rocks or mosses in mountainous and polar environments.

== Taxonomy ==
The genus was circumscribed by Austrian lichenologist Josef Hafellner in 1984, with Megalaria grossa assigned as the type species.

The genus Catillochroma has been synonymised with Megalaria by Alan Fryday and James Lendemer (2010) due to similar morphological characteristics. While this synonymisation has been debated, recent molecular phylogenetics studies support a broader circumscription of Megalaria that includes Catillochroma, pending further research with expanded taxon sampling.

== Description ==
Megalaria lichens have a crustose thallus (lichen body), which means it forms a crust-like layer that adheres closely to the substrate. The thallus lacks a distinct outer cortex, and its surface can range from smooth and continuous to granular in texture. The lichen's primary photosynthetic partner, or photobiont, is typically from the genus Dictyochloropsis, though other single-celled algae may also be involved.

The fruiting bodies, or ascomata, of Megalaria are sessile apothecia, meaning they are directly attached to the thallus without a stalk. These apothecia are relatively large and black, and they do not have a margin formed from the thallus (known as a thalline margin). Instead, the edge of the apothecium is made up of the true exciple, which is a layer of hyphae (fungal filaments) arranged in a vertical or anticlinal manner. These hyphae are coated in a thick gel. The hymenium (the spore-producing tissue) of the apothecia is generally colourless to pale brown, while the upper layer, called the epithecium, contains pigments that turn from greenish to dark purple when treated with potassium hydroxide solution (K+). The layer beneath the hymenium, the hypothecium, often shares this greenish to purple colouration, though it can sometimes appear pale.

The interior of the apothecia, or hamathecium, contains numerous slender paraphyses, which are thread-like sterile cells that can be either unbranched or slightly branched. Their tips are club-shaped, but they lack the dark caps sometimes seen in other lichens. The asci (spore-producing sacs) are typically cylindrical to club-shaped and contain between two and eight spores. These asci are of the Lecanora-, Bacidia-, or Biatora-type, which means they feature a broad, non-reactive (non-amyloid) apical cushion and a distinct ocular chamber.

The spores produced by Megalaria are generally ellipsoidal in shape, divided by one internal septum (1-septate), colourless, and smooth with thick walls. Unlike some other lichen spores, they do not have a distinct outer sheath. In addition to its sexual reproductive structures, Megalaria also produces asexual spores, or conidia, in structures called pycnidia. These conidia are colourless and can be ellipsoidal to cylindrical in shape.

Chemical spot tests generally do not detect any products in Megalaria species, although some species can produce secondary metabolites such as atranorin, zeorin, and fumarprotocetraric acid.

== Species ==
As of November 2025, Species Fungorum (in the Catalogue of Life) accepts 46 species of Megalaria.

- Megalaria allantoidea Fryday (2007) – Kerguelen Islands
- Megalaria anaglyptica (Kremp.) Fryday & Lendemer (2010)
- Megalaria bengalensis Jagad.Ram, Aptroot, G.P.Sinha & Kr.P.Singh (2007) – India
- Megalaria bryophila (Müll.Arg.) Elix (2012)
- Megalaria crispisulcans A.J.Marshall, Blanchon & de Lange (2023) – New Zealand
- Megalaria endochroma (Fée) Fryday & Lendemer (2010)
- Megalaria grossa (Pers. ex Nyl.) Hafellner (1984)
- Megalaria hafellneriana Kantvilas (2016) – Tasmania
- Megalaria imshaugii Fryday (2004)
- Megalaria insularis P.M.McCarthy & Elix (2018) – Australia
- Megalaria intermiscens (Nyl.) Fryday & Lendemer (2010)
- Megalaria intermixta (Nyl.) Kalb (2007)
- Megalaria jemtlandica (Th.Fr. & Almq.) Fryday (2004)
- Megalaria laureri (Hepp ex Th.Fr.) Hafellner (1993)
- Megalaria leptocheila (Tuck.) Fryday & Lendemer (2010)
- Megalaria leucochlora (Mont.) Fryday & Lendemer (2010)
- Megalaria macrospora Fryday (2004)
- Megalaria maculosa (Stirt.) D.J.Galloway (2004)
- Megalaria melaloma (Zahlbr.) Kantvilas (2008)
- Megalaria melanopotamica (I.M.Lamb) Fryday & Lendemer (2010)
- Megalaria montana P.M.McCarthy & Elix (2016) – Australia
- Megalaria obludens (Nyl.) Fryday & Lendemer (2010)
- Megalaria ochraceonigra (Räsänen) Kalb (2007)
- Megalaria orokonuiana Fryday & A.Knight (2012) – New Zealand
- Megalaria pannosa (Zahlbr.) Fryday & Lendemer (2010)
- Megalaria phaeolomiza (I.M.Lamb) Fryday & Lendemer (2010)
- Megalaria planocarpa Kantvilas (2016) – Tasmania
- Megalaria pulverea (Borrer) Hafellner & E.Schreiner (1992)
- Megalaria semipallida (Nyl. ex C.Knight) D.J.Galloway (2004)
- Megalaria spodophana (Nyl.) D.J.Galloway (2004)
- Megalaria subcarnea (Müll.Arg.) D.J.Galloway (2004)
- Megalaria subintermixta (Müll.Arg.) Kantvilas (2016)
- Megalaria sublivens (Nyl.) D.J.Galloway (2004)
- Megalaria subtasmanica Kantvilas (2008) – Tasmania
- Megalaria variegata (Müll.Arg.) D.J.Galloway (2004)
