= Fellhanera naevioides =

Scientific classification
- Kingdom: Fungi
- Division: Ascomycota
- Class: Lecanoromycetes
- Order: Lecanorales
- Family: Ectolechiaceae
- Genus: Fellhanera
- Species: F. naevioides

Binomial name
- Fellhanera naevioides Lücking, B.Moncada & Álvaro (2023)
- Type locality: Amazonas, Colombia

Species of lichen-forming fungus

Fellhanera naevioides is a species of leaf-dwelling, crustose lichen-forming fungus in the family Ectolechiaceae. It is a tiny, yellowish gray lichen that grows on living leaves in the understory of lowland rainforest in the Colombian Amazon. The species was described in 2023 and is named for its resemblance to Fellhanera naevia, from which it differs in its more scattered thallus and darker fruiting bodies.

== Taxonomy ==
Fellhanera naevioides was described as a new species in 2023 by Robert Lücking, Bibiana Moncada, and Wilson Ricardo Álvaro-Alba. It was introduced as a species similar to Fellhanera naevia but separable by its dispersed, minutely scalloped (crenulate) thallus and its darker apothecia. The epithet naevioides was explained by the authors as referring to the species' similarity to F. naevia.

== Description ==
The body (thallus) grows on living leaves as a crust up to 2 cm (0.8 in) across and about 15–25 μm thick. It is scattered in patches with irregular to finely scalloped (crenulate) margins. The surface is smooth to uneven and light yellowish gray. No visible border zone (prothallus) was observed. In cross-section, the thallus lacks an outer skin (cortex) and consists of more or less parallel fungal threads (hyphae) with clusters of algal cells between them. The algal partner (photobiont) is a green, rounded (chlorococcoid) alga.

The fruiting bodies (apothecia) sit directly on the thallus surface (sessile) and are rounded to irregular in outline, slightly convex, and about 0.1–0.2 mm in diameter. The disc is brown-black to black, and the inner fungal rim (proper margin) disappears with age (evanescent). The outer wall (excipulum) is strongly reduced (about 10–20 μm wide) and olive-brown, while the base of the fruiting body is well developed and brown-black (K−). The spore-bearing layer (hymenium) is about 35–40 μm high. The asci are club-shaped (clavate, about 30–35 × 5–6 μm), each containing eight colorless ascospores. The ascospores are divided into 4 cells (3-septate) and measure about 8–12 × 2.5–3 μm; they do not stain with iodine (I−). No secondary metabolites were detected using microscopic spot tests (applied under the microscope to thin sections).

== Habitat and distribution ==
The species is known from Colombia, with collections reported from the departments of Amazonas and Caquetá. It occurs in lowland rainforest, where it grows on leaves in the understory, often on palm leaves. It has been documented from about 240–250 m (790–820 ft) elevation and is currently known from two localities represented by several collections.
