= Hafellia gomerana =

Scientific classification
- Kingdom: Fungi
- Division: Ascomycota
- Class: Lecanoromycetes
- Order: Caliciales
- Family: Caliciaceae
- Genus: Hafellia
- Species: H. gomerana

Binomial name
- Hafellia gomerana Etayo & Marbach (2003)

Synonyms
- Buellia gomerana (Etayo & Marbach) Giralt & van den Boom (2011)

Species of lichen

Hafellia gomerana is a species of corticolous (bark-dwelling), crustose lichen in the family Caliciaceae. It is found in the Canary Islands. It has a creamy white-coloured thallus, and unique microscopic and chemical characteristics.

== Taxonomy ==
The lichen was formally described as a new species in 2003 by Javier Etayo and Bernhard Marbach. The species epithet refers to La Gomera, the island where the type specimen was collected. The new combination Buellia gomerana was proposed by Mireia Giralt and Pieter P.G. van den Boom in 2003; they suggested that this taxon as well as Hafellia alisioae (described simultaneously with H. gomerana), belonged to the genus Buellia (citing Elix 2009).

== Description ==
Hafellia gomerana is a crustose lichen with a white thallus that reacts with potassium hydroxide solution (K+ red). It has small, black reproductive structures (apothecia), which measure 0.25–0.50 mm in diameter (occasionally up to 0.60 mm). These apothecia begin flat with a slightly raised black margin that matches the colour of the disc but become convex as they mature, eventually losing the margin. The apothecial wall (exciple) is 20–30 μm thick on the sides and 60–70 μm at the base. It has a brown coloration and does not react to chemical tests with potassium hydroxide solution (K−).

The internal layer of the apothecia (hymenium) is 90–120 μm thick (up to 150 μm in some cases). It is filled with numerous small oil droplets (1–6 μm in diameter) and is mostly transparent, sometimes appearing slightly greenish. The hymenium is fragile and breaks easily under pressure. The uppermost layer (epihymenium) is brown to olive-brown in colour. The paraphyses—thread-like filaments within the hymenium—are septate (divided into segments) and have branching tips with enlarged ends that contain pigment. These filaments are 2–4 μm wide at their tips.

The asci (spore-producing structures) typically contain eight spores. The ascospores are grey-brown when mature, with lighter, almost transparent tips. They are 13–19 μm long and 6.5–8.0 μm wide and have thickened walls near the ends and along the septa (internal partitions), giving them a distinct, pseudo-tetrablastic appearance. The spores are smooth and can range in shape from straight to strongly curved. Conidiomata, the structures that produce asexual spores (conidia), were not recorded in the original description, but were later reported from specimens collected in Tenerife. They had a bacilliform shape and measured 6–9 by 1 μm.

== Habitat and distribution ==
Hafellia gomerana is endemic to the Canary Islands. It has been reported from its type locality in La Gomera, and from Tenerife.
