= Pyrrhospora palmicola =

Scientific classification
- Kingdom: Fungi
- Division: Ascomycota
- Class: Lecanoromycetes
- Order: Lecanorales
- Family: Lecanoraceae
- Genus: Pyrrhospora
- Species: P. palmicola

Binomial name
- Pyrrhospora palmicola Aptroot & Seaward (2009)

Species of lichen

Pyrrhospora palmicola is a type of corticolous (bark-dwelling), crustose lichen in the family Lecanoraceae. It has a yellow thallus with rounded to irregular apothecia (fruiting bodies) with pale brown or black discs. The lichen is found in Mato Grosso, Brazil, and the Seychelles.

== Taxonomy ==
Pyrrhospora palmicola was described as a new species in 2009 by the lichenologists André Aptroot and Mark Seaward. The type specimen was collected in 1974 from Anse Mais, Aldabra (Seychelles), where it was found growing on Cocos nucifera. This lichen is noted for its yellow thallus and the presence of a xanthone, most likely thiophanic acid, a characteristic distinguishing it from related species.

== Description ==
The lichen has a bright citrine-yellow to greenish-yellow or straw-coloured thallus, with a diameter of up to 1 cm. Apothecia are sessile and round to irregular in outline, measuring 0.2–0.4 mm in diameter. The disc is pale brown to usually fuscous brown to black, flat to convex, dull, and sometimes covered with a thin layer of white pruina. The margin of the apothecium is hardly prominent to evanescent and is about 0.1 mm wide, often becoming excluded. The excipulum is largely orange-brown in section and pale brown inside.

The hypothecium is orange-brown, approximately 20 μm high. The hymenium is infrequently anastomosing, not inspersed, and about 50–70 μm high. The epihymenium is orange-brown, with numerous relatively large crystals, about 5 μm high, with the crystals in potassium hydroxide solution dissolving to reveal slightly swollen paraphysis tips with the upper 1–2 cells grey-tinted. Ascospores are ellipsoid, 14–16 by 5–6 μm, with a wall nearly 1 μm wide.

This species is the first Pyrrhospora with a yellow, C+ (orange) thallus but without soredia. The authors suggest that it is probably closely related to P. quernea, sharing xanthones and small, pale to dark apothecia.

== Chemistry ==
The species contains a xanthone, most probably thiophanic acid. In terms of standard spot tests, the thallus reacts UV+ (pink) and C+ (orange).

== Habitat and distribution ==
Pyrrhospora palmicola was originally known to occur only in the type locality in Aldabra, Seychelles. It grows corticolously on coastal trees and shrubs. It has since been reported from the Chapada dos Guimarães, Mato Grosso, Brazil.
