= Pyrrhospora endaurantia =

Scientific classification
- Domain: Eukaryota
- Kingdom: Fungi
- Division: Ascomycota
- Class: Lecanoromycetes
- Order: Lecanorales
- Family: Lecanoraceae
- Genus: Pyrrhospora
- Species: P. endaurantia

Binomial name
- Pyrrhospora endaurantia Kalb & Aptroot (2021)

Species of lichen

Pyrrhospora endaurantia is a species of lichen in the family Lecanoraceae. Found in Kenya, it was described as a new species in 2021 by the lichenologists Klaus Kalb and André Aptroot. The type was collected on the Roaring Rocks in Tsavo West National Park (Central Province), at an altitude of about 1,300 m (4,300 ft). Here it was found growing on tree twigs in a savannah. The lichen has a dull, pale grey thallus bordered by a black hypothallus about 0.1 mm wide. The specific epithet endaurantia refers to its orange-red subhymenium and orange hypothecium (the tissue immediately below the subhymenium). The thallus of the lichen turns yellow with the K chemical spot test. Thin-layer chromatography showed the presence of atranorin in the thallus.

== Description ==
Pyrrhospora endaurantia forms a thin (roughly 0.05–0.1 mm), dull crust that is pale ochre-grey and minutely cracked into tiny polygons (areoles). A narrow, jet-black hypothallus only about 0.1 mm wide outlines the thallus as it spreads across twigs in the East-African savannah. The internal partner is a chlorococcoid green alga whose microscopic, spherical cells supply photosynthetic sugars to the fungus. Simple spot tests turn the surface yellow in potassium hydroxide solution (KOH, or the K test), indicating the presence of atranorin—one of the common sunscreen compounds that lichens deploy against intense light.

The lichen's fruiting bodies (apothecia) sit directly on the thallus but appear slightly pinched where they meet it, giving them a shallow, goblet-like stance 0.3–0.9 mm in diameter. When young, the discs are flat, matt to faintly glossy, and framed by a low, black rim; with age they become gently convex and the margin often fades to brown or erodes away. If attrition exposes the interior, a vivid orange hypothecium (the supporting tissue beneath the spore layer) is revealed—so rich in pigment that it flashes blood-red in KOH and releases a pinkish plume into the reagent. Above the hypothecium the hymenium is usually yellow but grades to red or orange-red as it approaches the pigmented layer, while the very top surface (epihymenium) is dark brown and sprinkled with granules that dissolve to green in KOH. Each ascus bears eight ellipsoid ascospores; they are colourless when young but gradually fill with orange oil, and mature at 7.5–12.5 μm long by 5–5.5 μm wide. No specialised asexual propagules (pycnidia) have been observed, and thin-layer chromatography detects only atranorin in the thallus together with an unknown orange pigment in the hypothecium that migrates close to—but not exactly with—7-chloroemodin.
