= Fellhanera gyrophorica =

Scientific classification
- Kingdom: Fungi
- Division: Ascomycota
- Class: Lecanoromycetes
- Order: Lecanorales
- Family: Ectolechiaceae
- Genus: Fellhanera
- Species: F. gyrophorica

Binomial name
- Fellhanera gyrophorica Sérus., Coppins, Diederich & Scheid. (2001)

Species of lichen-forming fungus

Fellhanera gyrophorica is a corticolous species in the family Ectolechiaceae. Previously noted in several publications as an unidentified Fellhanera species, it was formally named and described due to its unique characteristics and lack of ascomata (fruiting bodies).

== Taxonomy ==
The species was scientifically described in 2001 by the lichenologists Emmanuël Sérusiaux, Brian John Coppins, Paul Diederich, and Christoph Scheidegger. Fellhanera gyrophorica was initially recorded as an unidentified species in several works before its formal description in 2001. It belongs to the genus Fellhanera, known for its obpyriform conidia (i.e., shaped like an inverted pear), similar to many species in the F. subternella group. However, the production of gyrophoric acid in its pycnidial walls is an unusual trait for the group. The pycnidia of Fellhanera gyrophorica are notable for being sessile or shortly stalked, a characteristic not commonly found in the Ectolechiaceae.

== Description ==
The thallus of Fellhanera gyrophorica is corticolous, often forming large, noticeable patches or streaks along bark fissures. Its colour ranges from pale yellowish-green to green with a bluish tinge. The thallus consists of goniocysts that are finely farinose (like a whitish mealy powder) or scurfy granular, and it can be thin or thick and granular-warted when well-developed. The margin of the thallus is not well defined, lacking a prothallus. The photobiont is likely a Chlorococcaceae species, with green, spherical cells.

Pycnidia are a prominent feature, always present, and can be sessile or slightly stalked. They are pinkish to pale orange-brown, with a slightly pruinose outer wall. They typically react C+ (red) due to the production of gyrophoric acid. Conidia are typically obpyriform in shape.

== Similar species ==
Fellhanera gyrophorica resembles Micarea pycnidiophora, which also produces C+ (red) pycnidia due to gyrophoric acid. However, Micarea pycnidiophora has longer, bacilliform conidia and a more oceanic distribution. Other European corticolous species with conspicuous pycnidia but without ascomata may also resemble Fellhanera gyrophorica, but none of these species produce gyrophoric acid in their pycnidia.

== Habitat and distribution ==
This species is primarily found in Central Europe, with occurrences in Austria, Lithuania, Luxembourg, Poland, Switzerland, and Ukraine. It is typically found in well-preserved, shady, and humid broad-leaved forests at low elevations. Fellhanera gyrophorica grows on various deciduous and coniferous trees and is often associated with lichens such as Anisomeridium polypori, Graphis scripta, and Micarea prasina. Its habitats indicate a high ecological continuity, often featuring rich epiphytic lichen floras.
