= Fellhanera antennophora =

Scientific classification
- Kingdom: Fungi
- Division: Ascomycota
- Class: Lecanoromycetes
- Order: Lecanorales
- Family: Ectolechiaceae
- Genus: Fellhanera
- Species: F. antennophora

Binomial name
- Fellhanera antennophora Aptroot (2002)

Species of lichen-forming fungus

Fellhanera antennophora is a species of corticolous (bark-dwelling) crustose lichen in the family Ectolechiaceae. It occurs in Brazil.

== Taxonomy ==
Fellhanera antennophora was described as a new species by the Dutch lichenologist André Aptroot in 2002. It was identified from Brazil, in the Minas Gerais region. The species is noted for its distinct campylidia (helmet-shaped conidioma), which are the longest reported in the genus Fellhanera.

== Description ==
Fellhanera antennophora has a crustose (crust-like), finely granular thallus that can reach up to 13 cm (5.1 in) in diameter. The colour ranges from sandy brown to pale hues. The thallus is surrounded by an inconspicuous brown hypothallus with occasional visible granules. It hosts chlorococcoid green algae, mostly ellipsoid, measuring about 3–7 μm in diameter.

The granules of the thallus are more or less spherical (globose), measuring 20–50 μm in diameter. Apothecia (fruiting bodies) are flat to slightly convex, 0.5–1.0 mm in diameter, and 0.2–0.4 mm high. They are chocolate brown, often with nearly black spots, and have a greyish-white margin that fades with maturity. The excipulum is paraplectenchymatous, with dark brown hypothecium cells inside and hyaline (translucent), KOH-soluble crystals outside.

Ascospores are fusiform to long-ellipsoid, hyaline, and 3-septate, measuring 19–22 by 3–5 μm. Pycnidia are stalked with simple or rarely branched, dark brown to black conical campylidia that are often bent and mostly covered by a thallus-coloured pruina.

Chemical analysis of Fellhanera antennophora has shown no detectable substances, with reactions to chemical spot tests (K and C tests) being negative.

== Habitat and distribution ==
This species was discovered on an upright liana in one of the richest forest remnants near the Banho do Belchior area in Serra do Caraça, Brazil. It is typically found in association with lichen species from the genera Bulbothrix and Coenogonium.
