= Ramboldia gowardiana =

Scientific classification
- Kingdom: Fungi
- Division: Ascomycota
- Class: Lecanoromycetes
- Order: Lecanorales
- Family: Ramboldiaceae
- Genus: Ramboldia
- Species: R. gowardiana

Binomial name
- Ramboldia gowardiana (T.Sprib. & M.Hauck) Kalb, Lumbsch & Elix (2008)

Synonyms
- Pyrrhospora gowardiana T.Sprib. & M.Hauck (2003)

Species of lichen

Ramboldia gowardiana is a species of corticolous (bark-dwelling), crustose lichen in the family Ramboldiaceae. First discovered in 2003 in Montana, United States, it typically appears as a grayish or greenish crust on tree bark, particularly on conifers like pines and firs. The lichen is characterised by its small, bright red to orange-red reproductive structures (apothecia) visible on its surface. R. gowardiana is found in dry, temperate forests from Alaska to California, often at elevations between 300 and 1,400 meters (about 980 to 4,600 feet). Initially classified in a different genus, it was reclassified as Ramboldia in 2008 based on genetic studies. This lichen is part of the biodiversity of the Pacific Northwest region of North America.

== Taxonomy and naming ==
Pyrrhospora gowardiana was described as a new species in 2003 by Toby Spribille and Martin Hauck. The type specimen was collected in Lincoln County, Montana, in the northern Salish Mountains, in a forest on the south side of Edna Creek, approximately 7.5 km (4.7 mi) southwest of Trego. The lichen was abundant on the bark of twigs of Larix occidentalis (western larch) and was associated with other lichens such as Bryoria fuscescens and Lecanora circumborealis. The collection was made by Spribille at an elevation of 1,160 m (3,810 ft) on March 16, 2002. The holotype is deposited in the Canadian Museum of Nature, with isotypes distributed among several other herbaria. The species epithet honours the Canadian lichenologist Trevor Goward. Klaus Kalb, H. Thorsten Lumbsch, and John Elix transferred the taxon to Ramboldia in 2008 following a molecular phylogenetics study of the genus. In a later molecular analysis, R. gowardiana has a sister placement to R. elabens, indicating a close genetic relationship.

== Description ==
Ramboldia gowardiana has a crust-like thallus, which can range in color from grey and greyish olive to greenish-grey and whitish, particularly near the edges. The thallus is typically cracked and divided into small, irregular sections (rimose-areolate) and can be somewhat warty (verruculose or verrucose), though it is rarely smooth. The thallus lacks reproductive structures like soredia and isidia, which are common in many other lichens. Sometimes, a hypothallus—a layer beneath the main body—can be seen, with a dark reddish-brown to blackish colour. The thickness of the thallus varies widely, ranging from 100 to 1,000 μm.

The lichen contains a green algal partner (photobiont) of the trebouxioid type, with cells that are typically spherical or slightly oval, measuring between 6 and 26 μm in diameter.

Ramboldia gowardiana produces numerous apothecia, the fruiting bodies that produce spores. These apothecia are small, ranging from 0.2 to 2.5 mm in diameter, and can be found either individually or in clusters that merge to form small mounds. The apothecia are red to deep orange-red, with a matt surface that can be flat to strongly convex. They often have a constricted base and a surface that may be smooth or have irregular wrinkles and small bumps that sometimes radiate outward from the center.

The internal structure of the apothecia includes a hymenium, which is the layer where spores develop. This layer is 40 to 60 μm tall, pale yellowish to colorless, and becomes orangish towards the top. The hymenium reacts strongly with Lugol's iodine (IKI+ dark blue) but does not react with potassium hydroxide (K−). The top layer of the hymenium, known as the epihymenium, is 8 to 16 μm tall and ranges from deep burnt-orange to orangish-yellow. This layer also reacts with potassium hydroxide solution (KOH) (K+ purple) and contains tiny crystals, likely anthraquinones, that turn purple when treated with KOH.

The asci, or spore-producing cells, are cylindrical and contain eight spores each. These spores are colourless, one-celled, and narrowly ellipsoidal, measuring 7.5 to 12 μm in length and 2 to 3 μm in width. The hypothecium, a layer beneath the hymenium, is 70 to 110 μm tall and composed of irregularly interwoven fungal filaments. The excipulum, which surrounds the apothecium, is often indistinct but can sometimes form a raised margin that is the same colour as the disc. It appears as a 60 to 90 μm-wide orangish-red zone in cross-section.

About 30% of Ramboldia gowardiana specimens contain pycnidia, small flask-shaped structures that produce asexual spores (conidia). These conidia are filiform (thread-like), colourless, and slightly curved, measuring 15 to 23 μm long with a club-like thickening at one end.

Chemically, Ramboldia gowardiana reacts positively to certain chemical tests: PD+ (red) and K+ (purple) in its apothecia. The lichen contains atranorin and fumarprotocetraric acid, as detected by thin-layer chromatography.

== Similar species ==
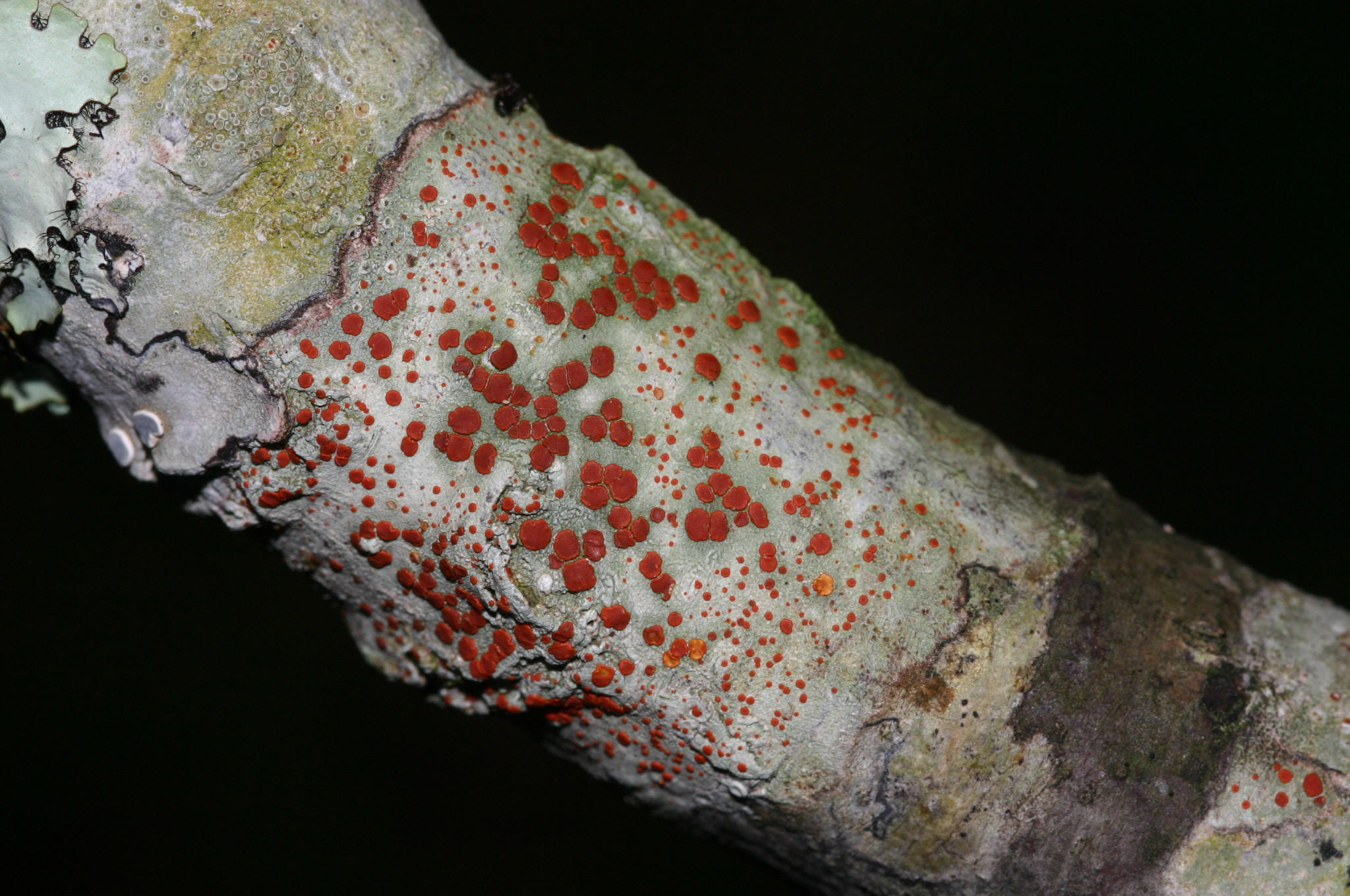
Ramboldia russula is one of a few lookalike species that resemble R. gowardiana, but it is chemically distinct.

According to the species authors, Pyrrhospora gowardiana was often mistaken for the more widespread Ramboldia cinnabarina, but there are several key differences. R. cinnabarina typically has a thin, whitish thallus that often bears small, creamish-white soralia, while R. gowardiana usually has a greyish, warty thallus that can range from thin to very thick. Additionally, R. gowardiana lacks soredia entirely, a feature commonly found in R. cinnabarina. The apothecia in R. gowardiana are generally larger, more clustered, and strongly convex, unlike the smaller and more scattered apothecia of R. cinnabarina.

Another similar species is Ramboldia russula, a pan-tropical lichen that also lacks soredia and has a greyish thallus. However, R. russula differs chemically, containing lichexanthone and norstictic acid, which are not present in R. gowardiana.

In its range, R. gowardiana might also be confused with Bilimbia rubricosa, which shares the characteristic deep red apothecia. However, B. rubricosa has a yellowish thallus due to the presence of usnic acid, narrow, multi-septate spores, and typically grows on hard, decorticated wood rather than bark.

Chemically, R. gowardiana shares the presence of fumarprotocetraric acid and atranorin with both R. cinnabarina and R. elabens, though atranorin may be absent in some specimens of R. cinnabarina.

== Habitat and distribution ==
Ramboldia gowardiana is found in dry, temperate forests, predominantly growing on the bark of twigs and branches of conifers at elevations ranging from 300 to 1,400 meters. This lichen species is commonly associated with trees like Pseudotsuga menziesii (Douglas-fir), Larix occidentalis (western larch), Pinus contorta (lodgepole pine), Pinus ponderosa (ponderosa pine), and Picea engelmannii (Engelmann spruce) in inland areas. In Oregon and California, it also occurs on Abies procera (noble fir) and Pinus attenuata (knobcone pine).

In northwestern Montana, R. gowardiana can be particularly abundant on the bark of Larix occidentalis branches and fine twigs, though it also grows on other conifers such as Abies grandis (grand fir), Abies lasiocarpa (subalpine fir), and Pinus monticola (western white pine), and rarely on Acer glabrum (Rocky Mountain maple). The lichen typically thrives in dry woodlands with low snow cover, short snow seasons, and warm, low-precipitation summers. The branches it colonizes are often rich in other lichen species commonly found on Pinus and Larix branches, including Bryoria fuscescens, Hypogymnia imshaugii, Lecanora circumborealis, and Lecanora schizochromatica.

In contrast, Ramboldia cinnabarina, a related species, tends to inhabit upper montane to subalpine forests, particularly on the trunks of Abies lasiocarpa and Picea engelmannii in areas with more consistent snow cover. The distinction between the niches of R. gowardiana and R. cinnabarina is especially noticeable in northwestern Montana, where R. gowardiana favours branches while R. cinnabarina is more commonly found on trunks.

Ramboldia gowardiana is known to occur from coastal southern Alaska to northern California, extending inland to Idaho and Montana. It has also been recorded from the Channel Islands off the coast of California. Many records of this species are from western Montana, suggesting that its distribution may be concentrated in the inland mesothermic forests of the Pacific Northwest.
