= Megalaria hafellneriana =

Scientific classification
- Domain: Eukaryota
- Kingdom: Fungi
- Division: Ascomycota
- Class: Lecanoromycetes
- Order: Lecanorales
- Family: Ramalinaceae
- Genus: Megalaria
- Species: M. hafellneriana

Binomial name
- Megalaria hafellneriana Kantvilas (2016)

Species of lichen

Megalaria hafellneriana is a species of crustose lichen in the family Ramalinaceae. Found in Tasmania, Australia, it was formally described as a new species in 2016 by lichenologist Gintaras Kantvilas. The species epithet honours Austrian lichenologist Josef Hafellner, who circumscribed the genus Megalaria and, according to the author, "undertook some of the pioneering, albeit unpublished research on Australian species".

== Description ==
Megalaria hafellneriana features a crust-like thallus that becomes patchily scurfy and granular, with a cream-white surface lacking a cortex. Its apothecia are scattered and roundish, with a black, epruinose disc that starts off flat but eventually turns convex. The hymenium is about 60–80 μm thick and has a blue-black, bluish-green or olive epithecial layer on top, while its asci are clavate and usually 8-spored. Its paraphyses are simple to sparsely branched with expanded apices. The lichen contains no detectable chemical substances.
