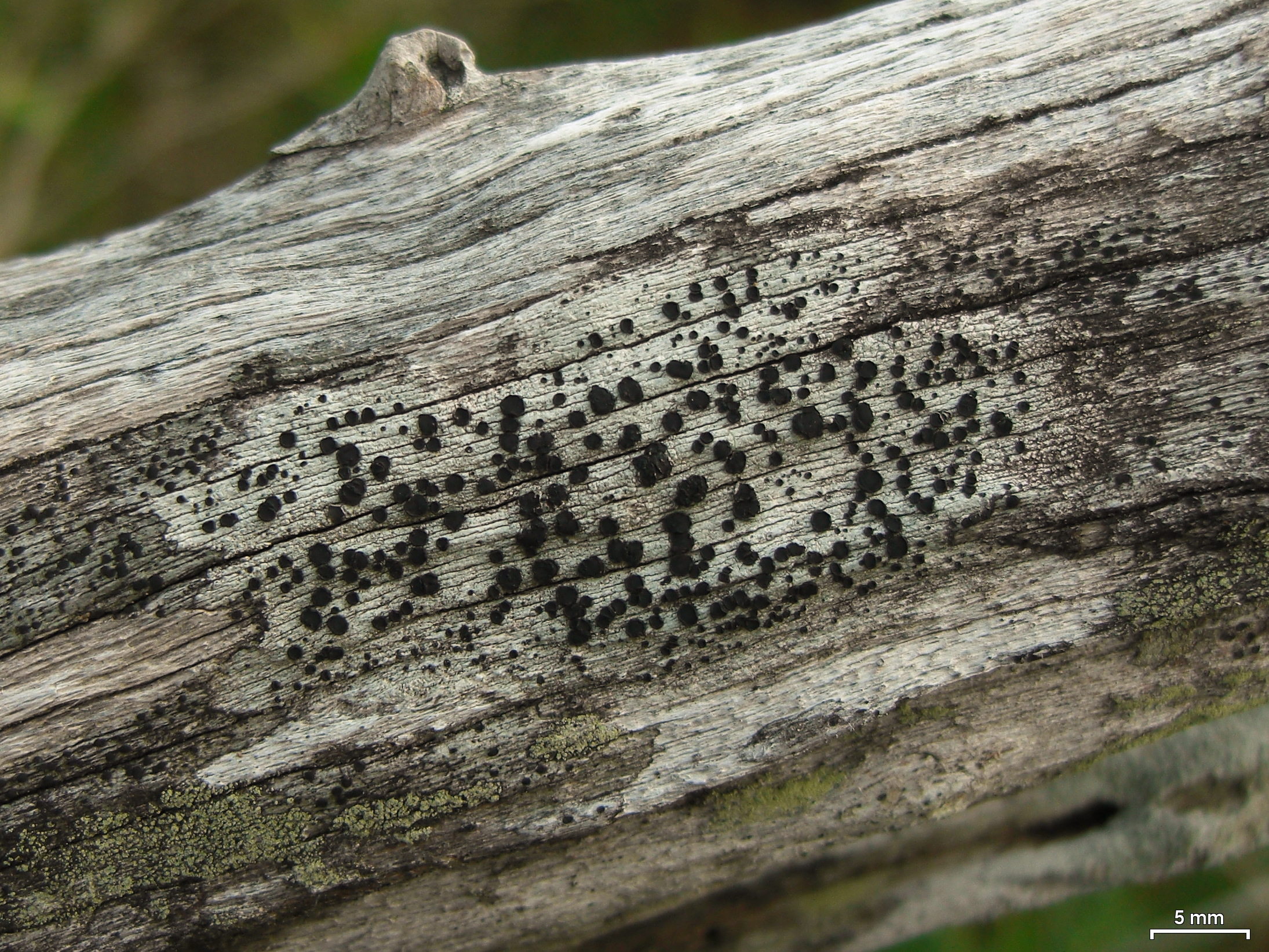
- Presumed Hafellia lichen, not identified to species

Scientific classification
- Domain: Eukaryota
- Kingdom: Fungi
- Division: Ascomycota
- Class: Lecanoromycetes
- Order: Caliciales
- Family: Caliciaceae
- Genus: Hafellia; Kalb, H.Mayrhofer & Scheid. (1986)

Type species
- Hafellia leptoclinoides (Nyl.) Scheid. & H.Mayrhofer (1986)

= Hafellia =

Genus of lichen-forming fungi

Hafellia is a genus of lichen-forming fungi in the family Caliciaceae. The genus has a widespread distribution, especially in tropical regions. The genus is named in honour of the Austrian lichenologist Josef Hafellner. The genus was proposed by the German lichenologist Klaus Kalb in 1986 to contain two bark-dwelling species, formerly in genus Buellia, with callispora-type spores. These ascospores have ridged walls, and are thin walled at their tips at early states of their differentiation.

== Species ==
- Hafellia alisioae Etayo & Marbach (2003) – Canary Islands
- Hafellia gomerana Etayo & Marbach (2003) – Canary Islands
- Hafellia nortetrapla Aptroot, Oliveira Junior & M.Cáceres (2020) – Brazil
- Hafellia pruinosa Marbach & Kalb (2000) – Guatemala
