= Fellhanera robusta =

Scientific classification
- Kingdom: Fungi
- Division: Ascomycota
- Class: Lecanoromycetes
- Order: Lecanorales
- Family: Ectolechiaceae
- Genus: Fellhanera
- Species: F. robusta

Binomial name
- Fellhanera robusta P.M.McCarthy & Elix (2017)

Species of lichen-forming fungus

Fellhanera robusta is a species of crustose lichen in the family Ectolechiaceae. Found in Australia, it was described as a new species in 2017. The type specimen was collected from a vertical shale cliff in Callala Bay (Jervis Bay, New South Wales). This location receives sea spray as well as surface runoff from above, and maintains a diverse lichen flora that contrasts with the absence of lichens in the surrounding shore area.

The thick, whitish lichen thallus of Fellhanera robusta forms irregularly shaped discs measuring up to 5 cm (2 in) in diameter; its specific epithet alludes to its unusual form. The lichen contains the secondary chemicals atranorin and norgangaleoidin.

== Taxonomy ==
Fellhanera robusta was described as new to science in 2017 by Patrick M. McCarthy and John A. Elix on the basis of material collected from a seaside shale cliff at Callala Bay, Jervis Bay, New South Wales. The species belongs to the mostly tropical genus Fellhanera (family Ectolechiaceae) but is unusual in being saxicolous—it lives on rock rather than on leaves or bark—and in forming a conspicuously thick, wart-covered crust. The specific epithet, robusta, alludes to this chunky, contorted thallus.

Within the genus, F. robusta sits in the F. bouteillei group, characterised by pale apothecia that produce permanently one-septate spores.

== Description ==
The lichen forms discrete, often circular colonies up to about 5 cm wide. Its thallus is crustose—a thin, paint-like growth firmly bonded to the rock surface—but rapidly thickens inward to produce warts and low cushions that give an almost cerebriform (brain-like) texture. Near the margin the crust is pale to medium grey-green, with individual warts (verrucae) 0.5 mm wide and about 0.2 mm tall; towards the centre the warts swell to 4 mm across and may reach 1.5–2.5 mm in height, turning whitish as they age . Microscopic inspection shows a poorly developed outer cortex above a dense layer of green, spherical algal cells, and a white medulla packed with calcium oxalate crystals—the latter give a gritty feel when the crust is cut. Simple chemical spot tests yield K+ (yellow), KC+ (red), while C and PD are negative, reflecting the presence of atranorin and norgangaleoidin.

Reproductive structures are plentiful in F. robusta. Apothecia sit flat or slightly raised on the larger warts; each is lecideine to biatorine (lacking a thalline rim), creamy-white to faintly greenish and 0.4–1.1 mm in diameter, sometimes merging into clusters. The disc starts plane but often arches gently with age; both disc and margin are unpigmented and translucent when moist. Internally, the hymenium is 50–65 μm tall, and each ascus bears eight colourless, narrowly ellipsoid spores with a single central wall (septum) measuring 8–15 × 3.5–7 μm. Immersed flask-shaped pycnidia release spherical to slightly ovoid conidia 1.5–2.5 μm across; these minute propagules provide an additional asexual means of dispersal.

A lookalike species, Fellhanera incolorata, grows on mangrove bark in southern New South Wales. In addition to the different habitat, it can be distinguished from F. robusta by differences in the thickness and form of its thallus, in secondary chemistry (F. incolorata contains atranorin and thuringione), and in spore size.

== Habitat and distribution ==
As of its original publication, Fellhanera robusta was known only from a single, 4–5 m-high vertical shale cliff bordering the tideline at Callala Bay on the northern shore of Jervis Bay, south-eastern New South Wales. The cliff face is unusually soft and friable, creating fresh rock surfaces that are alternately washed by sea spray and leached by soil water seeping from above—a combination that seems critical for the lichen's establishment. In this narrow, roughly 50 m-stretch the species forms dense mosaics together with the equally salt-tolerant Ramboldia curvispora, a yet-to-be-described Porpidia, and scattered colonies of Acarospora citrina, Amandinea julianeae, Buellia species, Physcia littoralis and Scoliciosporum umbrinum.

No other populations have been recorded despite targeted searches of similar coastal exposures; the lichen is therefore considered a local endemic, its distribution apparently restricted to this highly specialised microhabitat.
