= Ramboldia blastidiata =

Scientific classification
- Domain: Eukaryota
- Kingdom: Fungi
- Division: Ascomycota
- Class: Lecanoromycetes
- Order: Lecanorales
- Family: Ramboldiaceae
- Genus: Ramboldia
- Species: R. blastidiata

Binomial name
- Ramboldia blastidiata Kantvilas & Elix (2007)

Species of lichen

Ramboldia blastidiata is a species of saxicolous (rock-dwelling) and crustose lichen in the family Lecanoraceae. Found in Australia, it was formally described as a new species in 2007 by lichenologists Gintaras Kantvilas and John Elix. The type specimen was collected by the first author from the western slopes of Strzelecki Peaks on Flinders Island (Tasmania) at an altitude of 150 m (490 ft); here, in dry sclerophyll forest, it was found growing on a granite boulder. The lichen forms pale grey-green, olive-green to dull olive-brown crust-like patches up to 30 cm (12 in) wide. The authors suggest that it is widespread in temperate Australia and Tasmania, but not commonly collected. Others saxicolous lichens that it usually grows with include Ramboldia petraeoides, Lecanora farinacea, Xanthoparmelia mougeotina, and species from the genera Buellia and Rhizocarpon. The specific epithet blastidiata refers to the presence of blastidia, which are vegetative propagules that contain mycobiont and photobiont and are produced by yeast-like budding.
