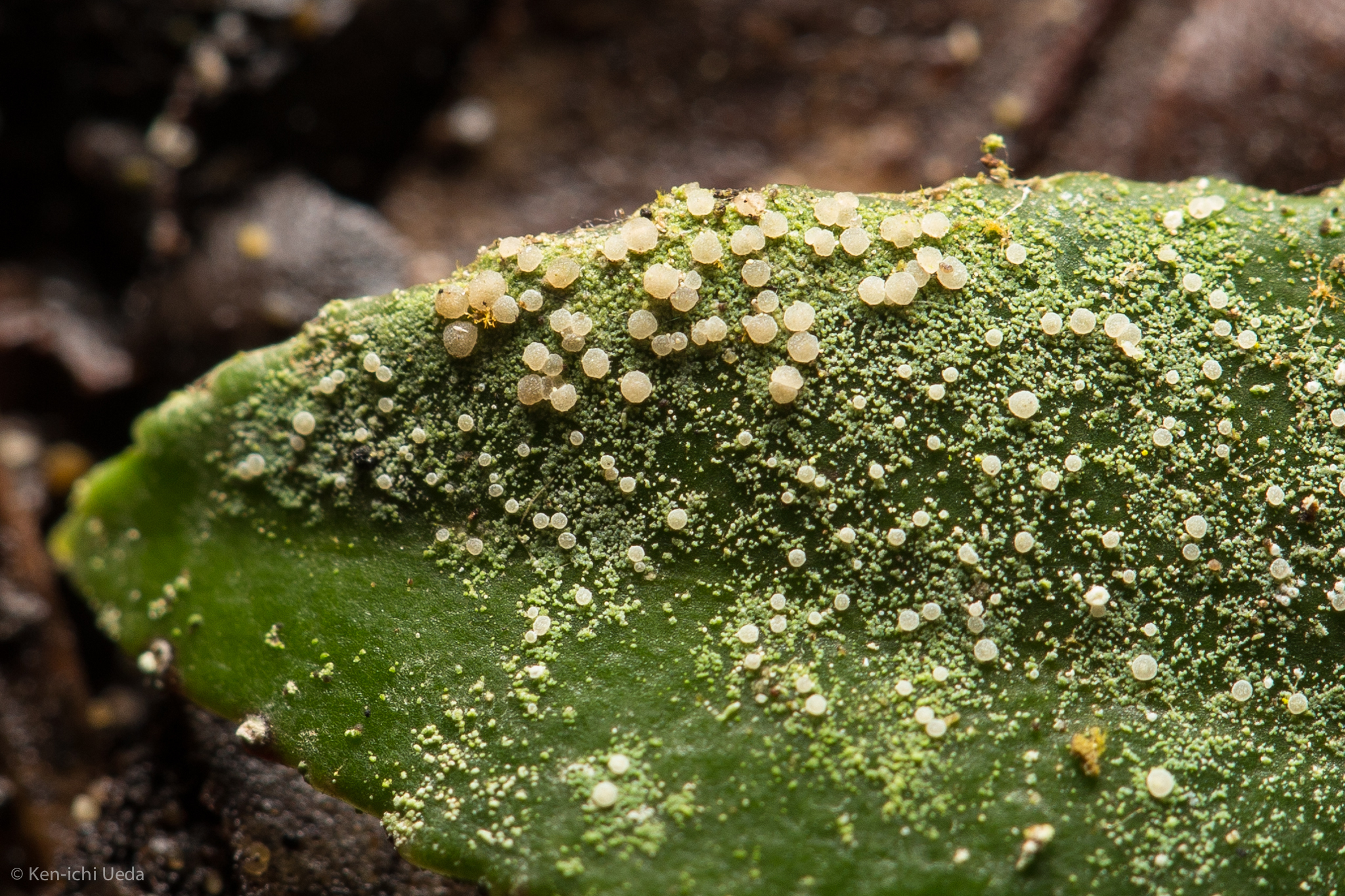
- Fellhanera bouteillei

Scientific classification
- Kingdom: Fungi
- Division: Ascomycota
- Class: Lecanoromycetes
- Order: Lecanorales
- Family: Ectolechiaceae
- Genus: Fellhanera; Vèzda (1986)

Type species
- Fellhanera fuscatula (Müll.Arg.) Vězda (1986)

Species
- See text.

Synonyms
- Lobaca Vězda (1983)

= Fellhanera =

Genus of lichen-forming fungi

Fellhanera is a genus of mostly leaf-dwelling lichens in the family Ectolechiaceae. Established by the lichenologist Antonín Vězda in 1986 and named in honour of the Austrian lichenologist Josef Hafellner, the genus comprises 69 accepted species as of 2026. These small lichens form powdery, crust-like growths that adhere tightly to their substrate without developing a true protective skin (a cortex), and they produce distinctive chemical compounds including roccellic acid and zeorin that help distinguish them from similar-looking genera.

== Taxonomy ==
Fellhanera was established by Antonín Vězda in 1986 for a set of mainly leaf-dwelling (foliicolous) lichens with hyaline (colourless), septate ascospores (spores divided by cross-walls) that had been scattered across the catch-all genera Bacidia, Catillaria, and Lopadium. Vězda had earlier treated the group informally as Lobaca, but as ascus structure became a key criterion in the 1980s he split the material into two groups: species with a Byssoloma-type apical apparatus (ascus-tip structure) were placed in Pilocarpaceae (since synonymized with Ectolechiaceae) as Fellhanera, while those with Sporopodium-type asci (and campylidia; small, curved asexual structures) were moved to ectolechiaceous genera (in or near Ectolechiaceae). He designated Fellhanera fuscatula (originally described as Patellaria fuscatula by Johannes Müller Argoviensis in 1881) as the type species and made 17 new combinations at publication.

In Vězda's circumscription, Fellhanera is diagnosed by biatorine apothecia (pale-margined fruiting bodies); a paraplectenchymatous exciple (a brick-wall–like rim tissue); thin paraphyses that are simple to branched and often anastomosing (joining); and asci sheathed in a thin amyloid gel with an amyloid tholus (apical dome) of the Byssoloma type. The ascospores are colourless, ellipsoid (egg-shaped), typically 1- or 3-septate, only rarely weakly muriform (with a few longitudinal walls); the conidiomata are sessile and wart-like, producing simple pyriform (pear-shaped) conidia. Vězda separated Fellhanera from the genera Byssoloma and Byssolecania chiefly by the exciple: in Fellhanera it is paraplectenchymatous, whereas many Byssoloma species have a byssoid (cottony), often crystal-rich exciple that sometimes only becomes clear after treatment with potassium hydroxide solution, so superficial similarity can be misleading.

The genus name is an anagram honouring Josef Hafellner, whose studies of ascus morphology underpinned this re-organisation; as delimited by Vězda, all included species were foliicolous lichen.

== Description ==
Fellhanera species form a crust-like thallus that adheres tightly to the substrate but never develops a true protective skin (cortex). When young the surface usually looks powdery or scurfy, ranging from whitish through grey-green to dull ochre, and may break into shallow wart-like bumps or irregular cracks as it matures. Some species produce minute soredia or blastidia—tiny, easily detached granules that propagate the lichen vegetatively—yet even these remain embedded in the soft, corticolous crust. The algal partner (photobiont) is a simple green chlorococcoid cell about 5–12 micrometres (μm) in diameter, and there is little or no distinct hypothallus, so the colony often merges imperceptibly into the bark or leaf it covers.

Fruiting bodies of Fellhanera lichens are small, stalkless apothecia that start flat and can become slightly domed; their discs may carry a delicate white bloom (pruina) and vary in colour from pale beige or yellow to dark brown. The rim of fungal tissue (true exciple) is built of rounded cells that can erode with age, leaving the disc exposed. Within, a clear hymenium reacts blue in iodine because each club-shaped ascus has an amyloid cap and coat; eight smooth, colourless ascospores are produced, usually divided by one to seven transverse walls (septa) and sometimes surrounded by a gelatinous sheath. Many specimens remain sterile in the field and instead develop plentiful immersed pycnidia—minute pustules whose gaping ostioles release tear-drop-shaped conidia. Chemically the genus is characterised by roccellic acid, zeorin and occasionally usnic acid or asemone; dropping acetone on a scrap of thallus on a microscope slide yields a tell-tale white ring of precipitated substances, a quick test that separates Fellhanera (chemically positive) from the look-alike genus Bacidina (chemically negative).

== Species ==
As of February 2026, Species Fungorum accepts 69 species of Fellhanera.

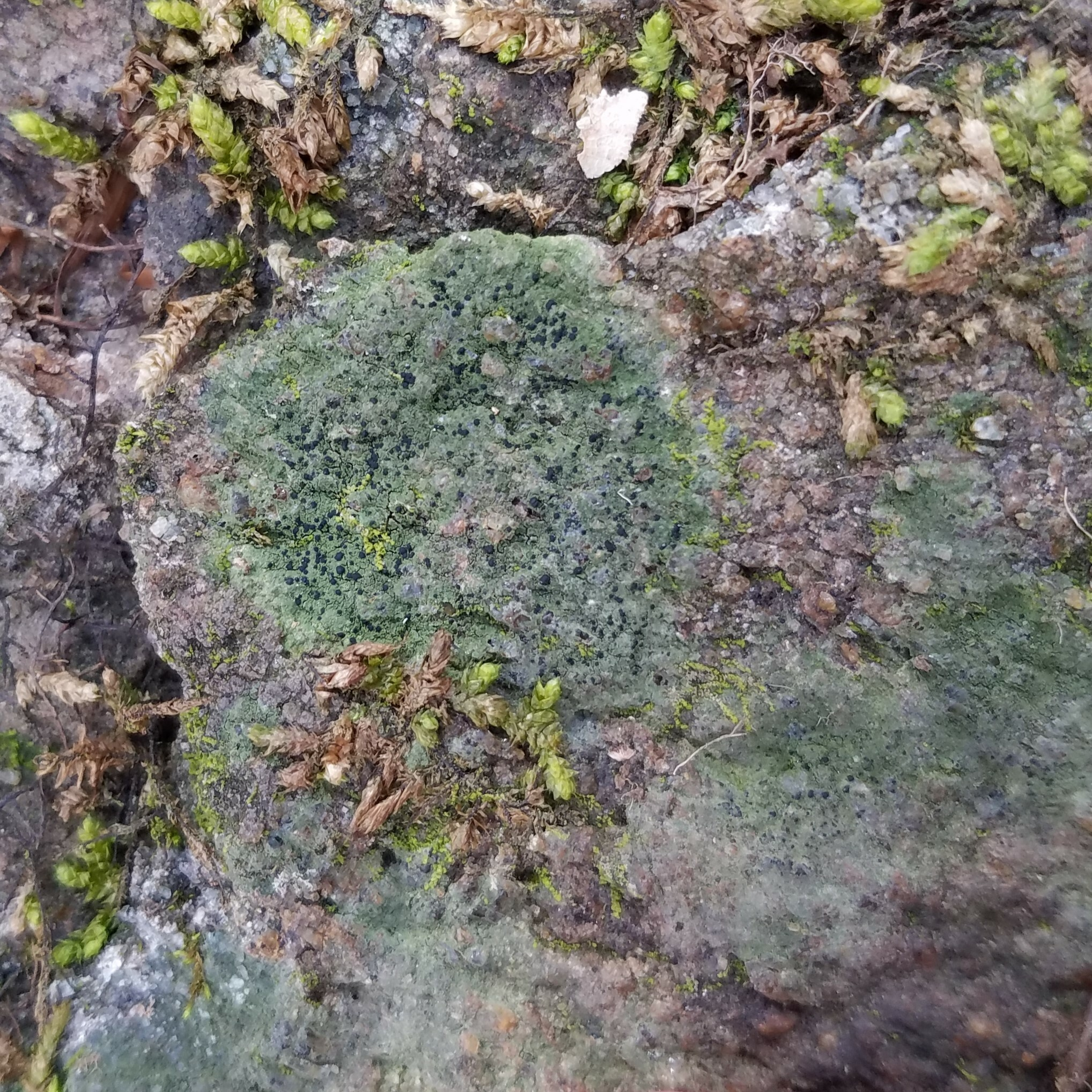
Fellhanera silicis

- Fellhanera africana (Vězda) Lücking (2001)
- Fellhanera albidocincta (Vain.) Lücking (2001)
- Fellhanera antennophora Aptroot (2002)
- Fellhanera atrofuscatula Herrera-Camp. & Lücking (2004)
- Fellhanera azorica van den Boom (2021)
- Fellhanera badimioides Lücking, Lumbsch & Elix (1994)
- Fellhanera baeomycoides M.Cáceres & Aptroot (2017)
- Fellhanera borbonica Sérus., van den Boom & M. Brand (2011)
- Fellhanera bouteillei (Desm.) Vězda (1986)
- Fellhanera bullata Kalb & Vězda (1991)
- Fellhanera chejuensis Lőkös, S.Y.Kondr. & Hur (2013)
- Fellhanera christiansenii Sérus. & Vězda (1994)
- Fellhanera colchica (Vězda) Llop (2007)
- Fellhanera congesta (Vězda) Vězda (1986)
- Fellhanera cryptocarpa (Riddle) Brako (1989)
- Fellhanera crucitignorum C.A.Morse & Ladd (2013)
- Fellhanera dominicana (Vain.) Vězda (1986)
- Fellhanera endopurpurea Hafellner & Vězda (1991)
- Fellhanera eriniae R.C.Harris & Lendemer (2009)
- Fellhanera fallax R.C.Harris & Lendemer (2009)
- Fellhanera flavostanhopeae Lücking & R.Sant. (2008)
- Fellhanera fragilis (Vězda) Lücking & Kalb (2001)
- Fellhanera fuscatula (Müll.Arg.) Vězda (1986)
- Fellhanera granulosa R.C.Harris & Lendemer (2009)
- Fellhanera guatemalensis van den Boom (2014)
- Fellhanera gyrophorica Sérus., Coppins, Diederich & Scheid. (2001)
- Fellhanera hybrida R.C.Harris & Lendemer (2009)
- Fellhanera incolorata P.M.McCarthy & Elix (2017)
- Fellhanera ivoriensis Lücking & R.Sant. (2001)
- Fellhanera laeticolor (Malme) Kalb (2016)
- Fellhanera mackeei Lücking & Hürl. (2001)
- Fellhanera maritima S.Y.Kondr., Lőkös & Hur (2013)
- Fellhanera mastothallina (Vain.) Lücking & Sérus. (2001)
- Fellhanera microdiscus (Vain.) Vězda (1986)
- Fellhanera minnisinkorum R.C.Harris & Lendemer (2009)
- Fellhanera montesfumosi R.C.Harris & Lendemer (2009)
- Fellhanera naevia (Vain.) Lücking & M.Cáceres (2001)
- Fellhanera naevioides Lücking, B.Moncada & Álvaro (2023) – Colombia
- Fellhanera nashii van den Boom (2004)
- Fellhanera obscurata Herrera-Camp. & Lücking (2004)
- Fellhanera ochracea Sparrius & Aptroot (2000)
- Fellhanera parvula (Vězda) Vězda (1986)
- Fellhanera pluviosilvestris P.M.McCarthy & Elix (2019) – Australia
- Fellhanera pruinosa Meethong, Lücking & Lumbsch (2026)
- Fellhanera punctata Lücking (2008)
- Fellhanera rhaphidophylli (Rehm) Vězda (1986)
- Fellhanera robusta P.M.McCarthy & Elix (2017)
- Fellhanera rubrolecanorina A.B.Peña & Colín (2004)
- Fellhanera santessonii Barillas & Lücking (1992)
- Fellhanera scottii F.Berger (2021)
- Fellhanera semecarpi (Vain.) Vězda (1986)
- Fellhanera seroexspectata Sérus. (1996)
- Fellhanera silhouettae Aptroot & Seaward (2004) – Seychelles
- Fellhanera silicis R.C.Harris & Ladd (2009)
- Fellhanera stanhopeae (Müll.Arg.) Lücking, Lumbsch & Elix (1994)
- Fellhanera stictae Etayo (2017)
- Fellhanera stipitata Weerakoon & Aptroot (2016) – Sri Lanka
- Fellhanera subfuscatula Lücking (1997)
- Fellhanera sublecanorina (Nyl.) Vězda (1987)
- Fellhanera submicrommata (Vězda) Lücking & Kalb (2001)
- Fellhanera subnaevia van den Boom (2021)
- Fellhanera subparvula van den Boom (2021)
- Fellhanera substanhopeae Lücking (1999)
- Fellhanera vezdae (Coppins & P.James) V.Wirth (1987)
- Fellhanera subtilis (Vězda) Diederich & Sérus. (1990)
- Fellhanera tasmanica Lücking & Elix (2001) – Australia
- Fellhanera termitophila Aptroot & M.Cáceres (2013) – Brazil
- Fellhanera tricharioides Lücking & R.Sant. (2008)
- Fellhanera tropica Elix (2008)
- Fellhanera tubulifera Rain.Schub. & Lücking (2003) – Costa Rica
- Fellhanera verrucifera Lücking (1997)
- Fellhanera viridisorediata Aptroot, M.Brand & Spier (1998)
- Fellhanera vulgata (Malme) Lücking (2021)
- Fellhanera wirthii (Vězda) Vězda 1986)
