= Josef Hafellner =

Austrian lichenologist and mycologist

- Born: 1951 (age 74–75)
- Scientific career
- Fields: Lichenology, mycology
- Institutions: Karl-Franzens-Universität
- Author abbrev. (botany): Hafellner

Josef Hafellner (1951– ) is an Austrian mycologist and lichenologist. He was awarded the Acharius Medal in 2016 for his lifetime contributions to lichenology. Before his retirement, he was a professor at the Karl-Franzens-Universität in Graz. Hafellner started developing an interest in lichens while he was a student at this institution, studying under Josef Poelt. He earned a master's degree in 1975 and a PhD in 1978, defending a doctoral thesis about the genus Karschia. In 2003, Hafellner received his habilitation. By this time, he had studied with French lichenologist André Bellemère (1927–2014) at Saint-Cloud, where he learned techniques of transmission electron microscopy and how their application in studying asci could be used in lichen systematics. His 1984 work Studien in Richtung einer natürlicheren Gliederung der Sammelfamilien Lecanoraceae und Lecideaceae has been described as "probably the single most influential publication in lichen systematics in the latter half of the 20th century".

His research interests include the classification and taxonomy of lichens and lichenicolous fungi and lichen floristics of the eastern European Alps. He has made about 100,000 scientific collections of specimens, including about 8000 lichenicolous fungi. Hafellner has introduced more than 600 scientific names to science, and as of 2016, authored or co-authored 289 scientific publications. In 2007 he started to edit and distribute the exsiccata Lichenicolous Biota.

== Eponymy ==
Hafellner has been honoured by having several taxa named after him, including five genera:

- Fellhanera Vězda (1986)
- Fellhaneropsis Sérus. & Coppins (1996)
- Hafellia Kalb, H.Mayrhofer & Scheid. (1986)
- Hafellnera Houmeau & Cl.Roux 1984)
- Henfellra Halıcı, D.Hawksw., Z.Kocakaya & Kocakaya (2016)

The following species are also named after Hafellner: Arthonia pepei Etayo & Pérez-Ort. (2016); Biatora hafellneri Rodr.Flakus & Printzen (2016); Biatoropsis hafellneri Millanes, Diederich, M.Westb. & Wedin (2016); Caloplaca hafellneri S.Y.Kondr. & Kärnefelt (2009); Capronia hafellneri Nograsek (1990); Capronia josefhafellneri Zhurb. & Etayo (2016); Dactylospora hafellneriana Sérus. (1984); Enterographa fellhaneroides Yeshitela, Eb.Fisch., Killmann & Sérus. (2009); Hypotrachyna hafellneri Elix, T.H.Nash & Sipman (2009); Malcolmiella fellhaneroides Lücking (2008); Megalaria hafellneriana Kantvilas (2016); Opegrapha hafellneri E.Zimm., Etayo & F.Berger (2016); Phaeosporobolus fellhanerae R.C.Harris & Lendemer (2009); Schismatomma hafellneri Egea & Torrente (1989); Stigmidium hafellneri Zhurb. (2009); Triblidium hafellneri Magnes (1997); Trichoconis hafellneri U.Braun, Khodos., Darmostuk & Diederich (2016); Xanthoparmelia hafellneri Elix (1999); Xanthoria hafellneri S.Y.Kondr. & Kärnefelt (2003).

== Selected works ==
A complete listing of Hafellner's 289 scientific publications up to 2016 is given in Grube and colleagues' commemorative article. Hafellner's major works include the following:

- Hafellner, J (1979). Karschia. Revision einer Sammelgattung an der Grenze von lichenisierten und nicht-lichenisierten Ascomyceten [Revision of a collective genus on the border of lichenized and non-lichenized Ascomycetes]. Beiheft zur Nova Hedwigia (in German). Vol. 62. pp. 1–248.
- Poelt, J.; Hafellner, J. (1975). "Schlauchpforten bei der Flechtengattung Thelocarpon". Phyton (in German). 17: 67–77.
- Hafellner, J. (1981). "Monographie der Flechtengattung Letrouitia (Lecanorales, Teloschistineae)" [Monograph of the lichen genus Letrouitia (Lecanorales, Teloschistineae)]. Nova Hedwigia (in German). 35: 645–729.
- Hafellner, J. (1984). "Studien in Richtung einer natürlicheren Gliederung der Sammelfamilien Lecanoraceae und Lecideaceae". In Hertel, H.; Oberwinkler, F. (eds.). Beitrage zur Lichenologie. Festschrift J. Poelt [Studies in the direction of a more natural classification of the collective families Lecanoraceae and Lecideaceae]. Beiheft zur Nova Hedwigia (in German). Vol. 79. Vaduz: J. Cramer. pp. 241–371.
