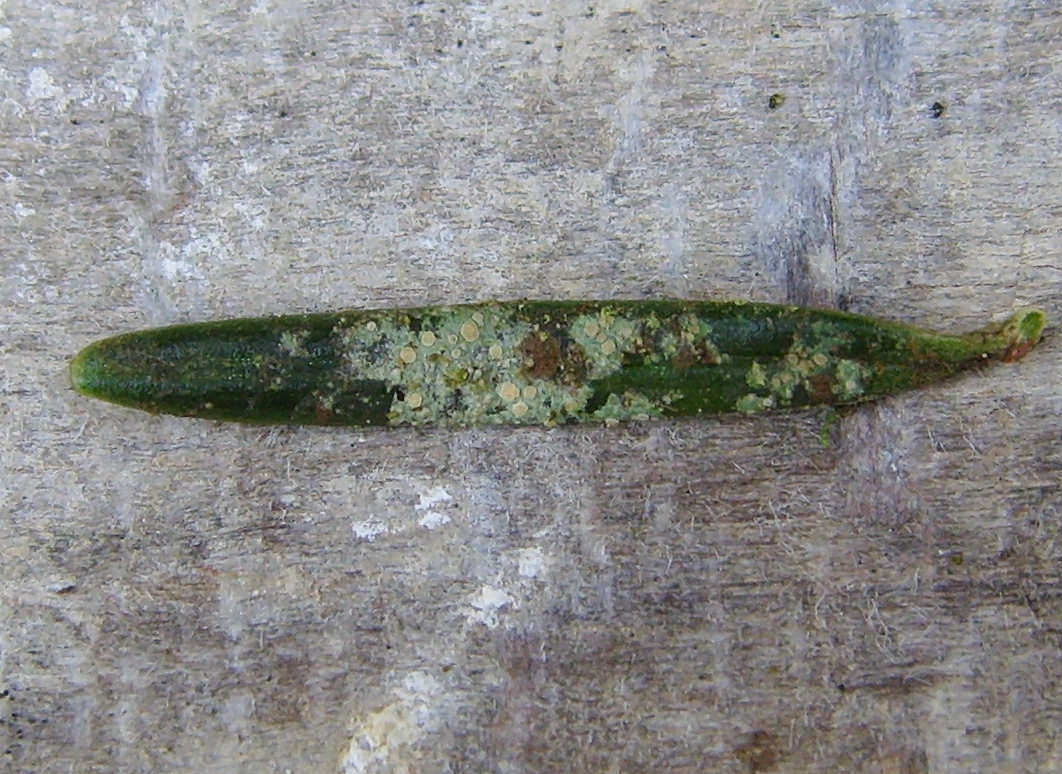

Scientific classification
- Kingdom: Fungi
- Division: Ascomycota
- Class: Lecanoromycetes
- Order: Lecanorales
- Family: Ectolechiaceae
- Genus: Fellhanera
- Species: F. bouteillei

Binomial name
- Fellhanera bouteillei (Desm.) Vězda (1986)

Synonyms
- Parmelia bouteillei Desm. (1847)

= Fellhanera bouteillei =

Species of lichen-forming fungus

Fellhanera bouteillei is a species of leaf-dwelling lichen belonging to the family Ectolechiaceae. It has a cosmopolitan distribution.
