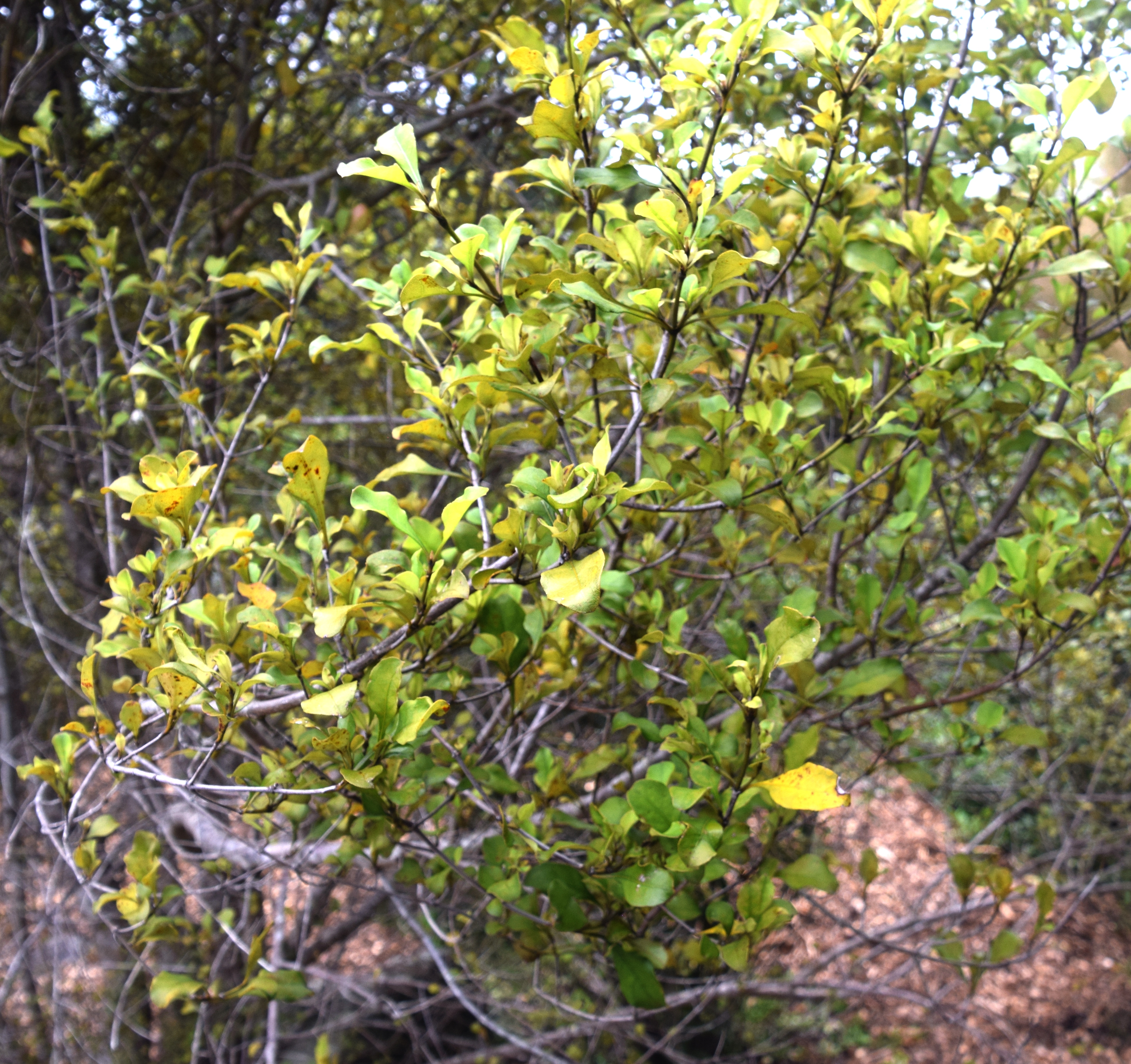
- In Auckland Botanic Gardens

Scientific classification
- Kingdom: Plantae
- Clade: Tracheophytes
- Clade: Angiosperms
- Clade: Eudicots
- Clade: Asterids
- Order: Gentianales
- Family: Rubiaceae
- Genus: Coprosma
- Species: C. arborea

Binomial name
- Coprosma arborea Kirk

= Coprosma arborea =

Species of plant endemic to New Zealand

Coprosma arborea is a species of tree found in New Zealand, traditionally known in Māori by the name mamangi. A typical occurrence location of the species is in the Hamilton Ecological District in New Zealand's North Island.

== Description ==
It is a small, bushy tree reaching 8–12 m (26–39 ft) in height with a trunk diameter of 20–50 cm (8–20 in). The branches are closely set, with slender branchlets. Adult leaves are somewhat glossy and hairless; they are dark green or yellow-green above and often mottled with maroon or purple and a pale wine-red underneath. The fruit is a non-poisonous juicy berry, containing two small seeds, usually oblong and 6–8 mm in length. The flowers have insignificant petals and are wind pollinated, with long anthers and stigmas.
