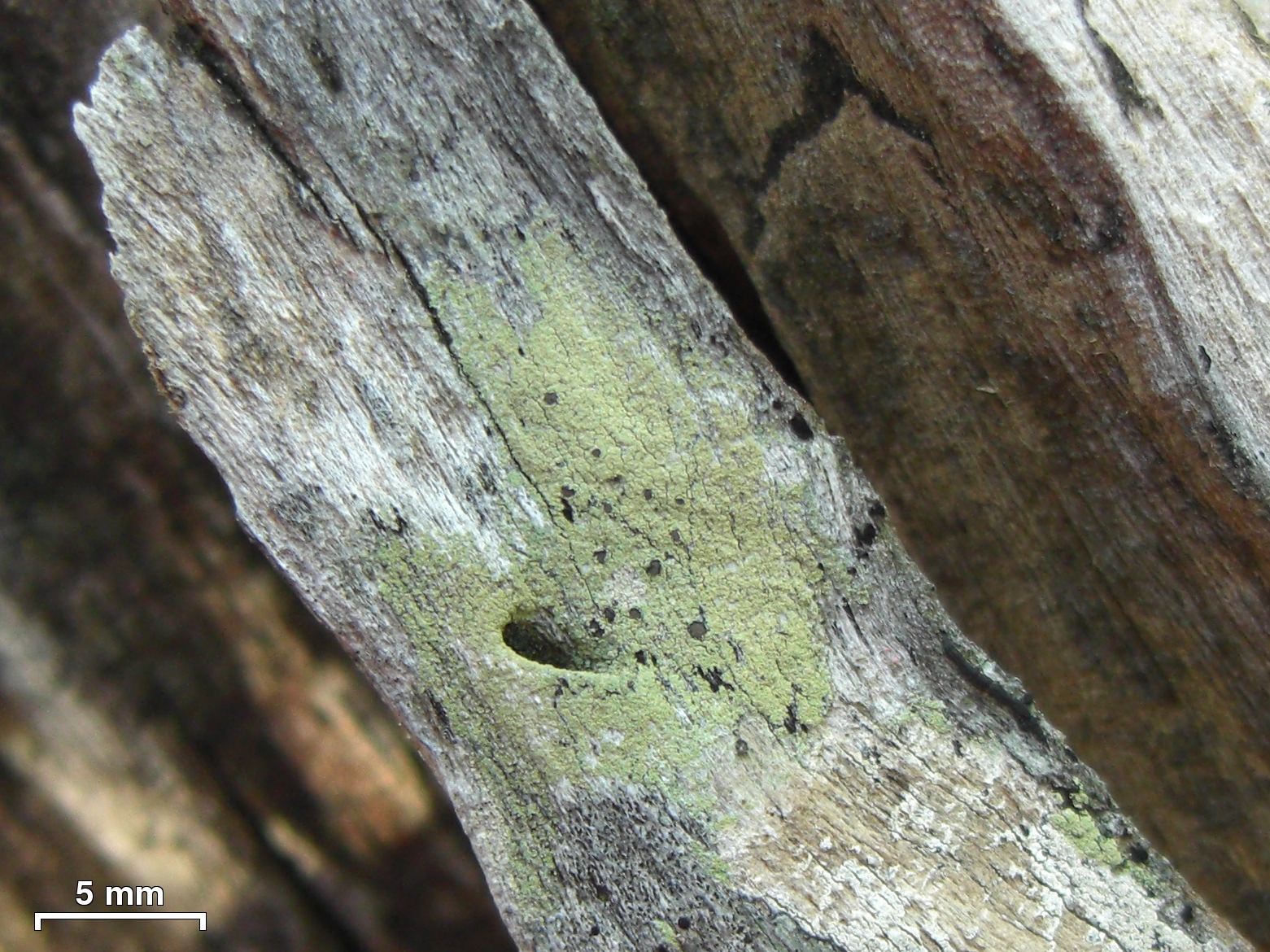
- Pyrrhospora quernea

Scientific classification
- Domain: Eukaryota
- Kingdom: Fungi
- Division: Ascomycota
- Class: Lecanoromycetes
- Order: Lecanorales
- Family: Lecanoraceae
- Genus: Pyrrhospora; Körb. (1855)

Type species
- Pyrrhospora quernea (Dicks.) Körb. (1855)

= Pyrrhospora =

Genus of lichens

Pyrrhospora is a genus of lichen-forming fungi in the family Lecanoraceae. The genus was established in 1855 by the German lichenologist Gustav Wilhelm Körber, who named it after the distinctive reddish-brown colour of the spores, combining Greek words meaning 'reddish-brown' and 'spore'. These lichens form thin crusty films on rocks and tree bark, producing button-shaped fruiting bodies that start reddish-brown and turn almost black with age. The genus contains eight species and is distinguished by its unique spore colouration and chemical compounds including anthraquinone pigments that give the characteristic reddish tinge.

== Taxonomy ==
The genus was circumscribed by German lichenologist Gustav Wilhelm Körber in 1855, with Pyrrhospora quernea assigned as the type species. In his protologue, Körber described Pyrrhospora as having distinctive reddish-brown coloured spores (monoblastic spores), a feature that he noted was unusual among lichens and which distinguished it from the related genus Biatora. The generic name derives from the Greek πυρρός (pyrrhos, meaning 'reddish-brown') and σπορά (spora, meaning 'spore'), directly referencing the characteristic spore colouration that defines the genus. Körber noted that this lichen formed a uniform crustose thallus with a barely distinct prothallus, and emphasised that the reddish-brown spores were the primary distinguishing character that necessitated establishing a separate genus rather than placing these species within existing genera.

== Description ==
The thallus of Pyrrhospora forms a thin, crust-like film that sits superficially on its rock or bark substrate. Its surface ranges from finely granular to slightly cracked into tiny areoles, and some species develop minute, scale-like lobes (squamules). Powdery reproductive structures called soredia may be present, allowing the lichen to spread vegetatively. The photosynthetic partner (photobiont) is a green alga from the genus Trebouxia, which supplies carbohydrates to the fungal partner.

Reproduction takes place in sessile apothecia—button-shaped fruit bodies that start reddish brown and become almost black and shiny with age. A true exciple composed of tightly bound, radially aligned fungal hyphae is visible when apothecia are young but erodes as they mature, so no thalline margin surrounds the disc. Microscopic examination shows a reddish-purple reaction in the pigmented epithecium when treated with potassium hydroxide solution, while the underlying hymenium is clear, 50–60 μm tall, and turns blue in iodine solution. Slender sterile filaments (paraphyses) thread the hymenium; they are usually unbranched and only slightly widened at the tips. Each club-shaped (clavate) ascus holds eight single-celled ascospores that are broadly ellipsoidal, smooth, and colourless to faintly brown by maturity, lacking a separate outer sheath.

Secondary chemistry provides additional diagnostic characters. The apothecia contain anthraquinone pigments—including 7-chloroemodin—and various xanthones, compounds that often impart the reddish tinge and positive potassium hydroxide reaction. The thallus synthesises a broader suite of lichen products such as atranorin, fumarprotocetraric, norstictic and connorstictic acids, thiophanic acid, arthothelin and its isomer, usnic acid, and several chlorinated xanthones.

== Species ==
As of June 2025, Species Fungorum (in the Catalogue of Life) accept eight species of Pyrrhospora:

- Pyrrhospora bhutanensis Aptroot (2002)
- Pyrrhospora chlororphnia (Tuck.) Aptroot & Seaward (2005)
- Pyrrhospora endaurantia Kalb & Aptroot (2021)
- Pyrrhospora fuscisidiata Aptroot & Wolseley (2007)
- Pyrrhospora luminescens Aptroot & Wolseley (2007)
- Pyrrhospora palmicola Aptroot & Seaward (2009) – Seychelles
- Pyrrhospora quernea (Dicks.) Körb. (1855)
- Pyrrhospora rubiginans (Nyl.) P.James & Poelt (1981)
