= Micarea bebourensis =

Scientific classification
- Kingdom: Fungi
- Division: Ascomycota
- Class: Lecanoromycetes
- Order: Lecanorales
- Family: Ectolechiaceae
- Genus: Micarea
- Species: M. bebourensis

Binomial name
- Micarea bebourensis M.Brand, van den Boom & Sérus. (2014)

Species of lichen-forming fungus

Micarea bebourensis is a species of lichen-forming fungus in the family Ectolechiaceae. It was described as new to science in 2014 from Réunion (Mascarene archipelago) in the Indian Ocean. The type specimen was collected in the Forêt de Bébour, along the trail to Cassé de Takamaka, in wet montane rainforest at about 1,340 m elevation, where it was found growing on a rotting standing trunk. On Réunion it has been recorded from lower montane forest at roughly 1,200–1,500 m, on decaying wood and on introduced trees including Cryptomeria japonica. The species epithet bebourensis alludes to the name of the forest from which it was collected.

The thallus is pale to brownish grey or greenish and is typically tuberculate when young, with small raised tubercles that can later break open to give a rough, blue-grey, soralia-like surface, although true powdery soredia are not formed. The apothecia are small (up to about 0.6 mm across), light to dark greyish brown, and often nearly globose with a constricted base. The ascospores are ovate to shortly rod-shaped (bacilliform), usually 1-septate (sometimes up to 3-septate), about 11–14 × 3.3–4.3 μm. Chemically, the species produces gyrophoric acid (C+ red), a feature used to separate it from look-alikes such as Micarea lignaria and M. pseudolignaria, and the authors noted that its placement in Micarea is somewhat uncertain because its asci and tholus differ from those typical of the core group of the genus.
