= Takamaka =

Takamaka is the name of several places in the Indian Ocean:

- Takamaka, Réunion, a village in Réunion
- Takamaka, Seychelles is a region of Mahé, Seychelles
- Île Takamaka (disambiguation), the name of two islands in the Chagos Archipelago
- Calophyllum tacamahaca, a genus of tropical flowering plants
