= Micarea isidiosa =

Scientific classification
- Kingdom: Fungi
- Division: Ascomycota
- Class: Lecanoromycetes
- Order: Lecanorales
- Family: Ectolechiaceae
- Genus: Micarea
- Species: M. isidiosa

Binomial name
- Micarea isidiosa M.Brand, van den Boom & Sérus. (2014)
- Type locality: Forêt de Bébour, Réunion

Species of lichen-forming fungus

Micarea isidiosa is a species of lichen-forming fungus in the family Ectolechiaceae. It was described as new to science in 2014 from the tropical island of Réunion (Mascarene archipelago) in the Indian Ocean. The type collection was made in the Forêt de Bébour, on the path from Bélouve to Cabane Dufour, where it grew on stems of Erica in wet montane ericoid (heather-family) thickets at about 1,890 m elevation. On Réunion it has been recorded from the same high-elevation thickets (about 1,900–2,000 m), where it occurs on Erica stems.

The lichen forms a discontinuous greenish to brownish thallus up to about 3 cm across, made of small, globose, isidia-like areoles that can become elongated and forked. These structures arise directly from a partly dark border zone (prothallus) rather than as true isidia growing from the surface. Its black apothecia (fruiting bodies) are small (to about 0.4 mm wide) and contain narrow, rod-shaped spores that are typically 3–7-septate (about 22.5–29.8 × 2.8–2.9 μm). Chemically, it produces gyrophoric acid (C+ red) and has distinctive pigments in the apothecia, including a blue-green pigment that reacts K+ (intense green) and a red hymenial pigment that gives a characteristic dark-blue granular precipitate in N. These characters were used to separate it from similar Réunion species such as Micarea tenuispora.
