= Micarea pseudocoppinsii =

Scientific classification
- Kingdom: Fungi
- Division: Ascomycota
- Class: Lecanoromycetes
- Order: Lecanorales
- Family: Ectolechiaceae
- Genus: Micarea
- Species: M. pseudocoppinsii

Binomial name
- Micarea pseudocoppinsii M.Brand, van den Boom & Sérus. (2014)

Species of lichen-forming fungus

Micarea pseudocoppinsii is a species of lichen-forming fungus in the family Ectolechiaceae. It was described as new to science in 2014 from the tropical island of Réunion (Mascarene archipelago) in the Indian Ocean. The type collection was made north-northwest of Piton de la Fournaise, along the Ravine Savane Cimetière trail, where it grew on the soft bark of Acacia heterophylla in mixed montane forest at about 2,050 m elevation. On Réunion it is known from montane sites between about 1,500 and 2,050 m, where it has been found on Acacia bark and overgrowing mosses. The species epithet refers to the similar Micarea coppinsii.

The lichen forms a small, diffuse, pale greenish thallus (about 1.5 cm across) made up of tiny granules or goniocysts (small clusters of algal cells wrapped in fungal hyphae), with locally well-developed, convex soralia about 0.3–0.6 mm wide that produce very fine, light-green soredia. Its apothecia are small (to about 0.4 mm wide), convex, and pale (white to pale orange, sometimes partly bluish grey), and contain 8 rod-shaped to ellipsoid spores per ascus that are up to 3-septate (about 11.5–14.7 × 4.2–5.7 μm). Chemically, it produces gyrophoric acid (C+ red; K−, P−), and it was separated from M. coppinsii by its shorter spores and the absence of methylhiascic acid. It was considered most likely related to the Micarea peliocarpa group because of its apothecial structure and sorediate thallus.
