= Micarea takamakae =

Scientific classification
- Kingdom: Fungi
- Division: Ascomycota
- Class: Lecanoromycetes
- Order: Lecanorales
- Family: Ectolechiaceae
- Genus: Micarea
- Species: M. takamakae

Binomial name
- Micarea takamakae M.Brand, van den Boom & Sérus. (2014)

Species of lichen-forming fungus

Micarea takamakae is a species of lichen-forming fungus in the family Ectolechiaceae. It was described as new to science in 2014 from the tropical island of Réunion (Mascarene archipelago) in the Indian Ocean. The type collection was made west-southwest of Saint-Benoît, along the road to Takamaka (about 3 km south-west of Abondance les Hauts), where it was found at about 620 m elevation in a high-rainfall disturbed area with planted trees, growing on decaying wood of a standing trunk. The species is known only from the type locality, and its name refers to "Le Cassé de Takamaka", a scenic area on the island's northern flank.

The lichen has an inconspicuous, whitish thallus that is partly endoxylic (partly within the decaying wood) and is made up of scattered goniocysts (tiny clusters of algal cells wrapped in fungal hyphae). Its apothecia (fruiting bodies) are very small and adnate (to about 0.2 mm wide), and it produces ellipsoid spores that are 0–1-septate (about 8.8–10.2 × 3.1–3.8 μm). The species also contains an unidentified chemical that the authors suggested may be confluentic acid (or a related compound), which would be unusual in Micarea. They also noted that, although the excipulum and hymenium resemble those of Micarea erratica, the combination of other characters (including the small spores and chemistry) sets it apart.
