= Micarea boryana =

Scientific classification
- Kingdom: Fungi
- Division: Ascomycota
- Class: Lecanoromycetes
- Order: Lecanorales
- Family: Ectolechiaceae
- Genus: Micarea
- Species: M. boryana

Binomial name
- Micarea boryana M.Brand, van den Boom & Sérus. (2014)

Species of lichen-forming fungus

Micarea boryana is a species of lichen-forming fungus in the family Ectolechiaceae. It was described as new to science in 2014 from the tropical island of Réunion (Mascarene archipelago) in the Indian Ocean. The type collection was made in the Cirque de Cilaos, north of Cilaos in the Forêt du Grand Matarum, where it grew on bark of the planted conifer Cryptomeria japonica in montane forest at about 1,420 m elevation. On Réunion it has been recorded from several sites between about 1,200 and 1,500 m, and has always been reported as epiphytic on Cryptomeria. The species epithet honours the French naturalist and early Réunion lichen collector Jean-Baptiste Bory de Saint-Vincent.

The lichen forms a greenish to greyish-brown areolate thallus up to about 5 cm across, with small flat to slightly convex (sometimes almost granular) areoles and a thin, dark bluish-black border zone (prothallus) that becomes more eroded with age. Its grey to bluish-black apothecia (fruiting bodies) are very small (usually under about 0.16 mm wide), and contain narrow, needle-like (acicular) spores that are typically 3-septate (about 16–27 × 2.0–2.5 μm). Conspicuous dark pycnidia are often present and may show a white droplet of conidia at the top. Chemically, the species produces gyrophoric acid (C+ red), and it was distinguished from similar acicular-spored taxa (including Micarea mutabilis) by a combination of its dark prothallus, smaller and less septate spores, and its prominent conidial structures.
