= Micarea sublithinella =

Scientific classification
- Kingdom: Fungi
- Division: Ascomycota
- Class: Lecanoromycetes
- Order: Lecanorales
- Family: Ectolechiaceae
- Genus: Micarea
- Species: M. sublithinella

Binomial name
- Micarea sublithinella M.Brand, van den Boom & Sérus. (2014)

Species of lichen-forming fungus

Micarea sublithinella is a species of bark-dwelling, lichen-forming fungus in the family Ectolechiaceae. It was described as new to science in 2014 from the tropical island of Réunion (Mascarene archipelago) in the Indian Ocean. The type collection was made north-northwest of Piton de la Fournaise, along the Ravine Savane Cimetière trail, where it grew on bark of Acacia heterophylla in mixed montane forest at about 2,050 m elevation. On Réunion it has also been recorded from other montane localities, at elevations from about 1,370 to 1,720 m, where it occurs on wood of rotting trunks and on tree bark.

The lichen forms a thin green thallus (about 2 cm across) that is continuous or broken into flat, rounded areoles over a slightly shiny film. Its apothecia are very small (usually to about 0.4 mm wide), dull and light brownish, and become convex to almost spherical (globose). The ascospores are obovoid, usually 0–1-septate, and measure about 12.5–15 × 5–5.8 μm. Pycnidia have not been observed. Chemically, it produces protolichesterinic acid (a fatty acid), with crystals reported mainly in the epihymenium but also present in the thallus. It can be confused in the field with Micarea lithinella, which differs in being saxicolous (rock-dwelling) and in lacking lichen substances.
