= Micarea senecionis =

Scientific classification
- Kingdom: Fungi
- Division: Ascomycota
- Class: Lecanoromycetes
- Order: Lecanorales
- Family: Ectolechiaceae
- Genus: Micarea
- Species: M. senecionis

Binomial name
- Micarea senecionis van den Boom (2010)
- Type locality: Barranco de la Poceta, Canary Islands

Species of lichen-forming fungus

Micarea senecionis is a species of crustose lichen in the family Ectolechiaceae. It forms small, whitish patches and produces reddish-brown to blackish fruiting bodies. The species is known only from Lanzarote (Canary Islands), where it grows on dead shrubs of Kleinia neriifolia.

== Taxonomy ==
Micarea seneciae was described as a new species in 2010 by Pieter van den Boom, based on material collected on Lanzarote (the Canary Islands). The type collection was made on 8 March 2003 at El Risco de Famara (Barranco de la Poceta), at 475 m elevation, where it was found growing on dead standing Kleinia neriifolia. The host plant was referred to as Senecio kleinia in the original description but is now placed in Kleinia as Kleinia neriifolia. The holotype is deposited in the herbarium of the University of Liège (LG). The original epithet seneciae was later corrected to senecionis to bring the name into grammatical agreement with the Latin genitive of the host genus Senecio.

Van den Boom placed the species in Micarea because the apothecia have only a weakly developed true exciple (the rim tissue), the sterile filaments in the hymenium (paraphyses) are branched and often interconnected, and the asci are of the Lecanora-type while producing small, single-septum ascospores. The paraphyses are comparatively broad for the genus, a feature reported otherwise in species such as M. erratica and M. botryoides.

== Description ==
The thallus forms whitish to pale cream patches up to about 3 mm wide and up to about 0.2 mm thick, typically as small, sharply delimited areas among other crustose lichens. The photobiont is a chlorococcoid green alga with cells 6–15 μm in diameter.

The apothecia are reddish-brown to dark brown or blackish, up to 0.4 mm across, and usually lack a distinct margin; they range from nearly flat to slightly convex. In spot tests, the upper parts of the apothecia (epithecium and hymenium) show no colour reaction with potassium hydroxide or nitric acid (K−, N−). Under the microscope, the paraphyses are mostly 2–2.5 μm thick and may have widened tips up to 5 μm, which are often darkly pigmented. The asci are 8-spored and measure 25–35 × 8–10 μm. The ascospores are hyaline, ellipsoid, 1-septate, and about 8–10 × 2.5–3.5 μm. No pycnidia were observed, and no lichen products were detected.

== Habitat and distribution ==
At the time of its description, Micarea senecionis was known only from the type locality on Lanzarote, where it occurred abundantly on shrubs of Kleinia neriifolia in a Kleinio-Euphorbietum community (a shrubland association dominated by Kleinia and Euphorbia) on volcanic outcrops in a valley with a west-northwest-facing slope. It was recorded growing together with other lichens including Bryostigma muscigenum, Toninia populorum, various Caloplaca species, Lecania cyrtella, and Xanthoria parietina.
