= Micarea viridileprosa =

Scientific classification
- Kingdom: Fungi
- Division: Ascomycota
- Class: Lecanoromycetes
- Order: Lecanorales
- Family: Ectolechiaceae
- Genus: Micarea
- Species: M. viridileprosa

Binomial name
- Micarea viridileprosa Coppins & van den Boom (2001)

Species of lichen-forming fungus

Micarea viridileprosa is a species of crustose lichen in the family Ectolechiaceae that was first described in 2001. This crustose lichen is known to grow on bark, wood, and soil, and is distinguishable by its bright greenish soredia.

== Taxonomy ==
It was formally described as a new species by the lichenologists Brian John Coppins and Pieter van den Boom in 2001. The type specimen of Micarea viridileprosa was collected in France, Finistère, near Douarnenez at Pointe du Millier, Moulin de Keriolet, in a sheltered valley on mature Castanea sativa. A later molecular analysis showed that Micarea viridileprosa is a sister species to Micarea micrococca.

== Description ==
The thallus of Micarea viridileprosa is crustose, composed of bright greenish goniocysts (vegetative propagules), which can coalesce to form larger granules. These goniocysts are typically 12–18 μm in diameter, but can grow up to 25–40 μm. The thallus may appear glossy when dry due to a thin coating of gelatinous algae. The lichen's growth often gives the appearance of irregular "soralia", producing powdery "soredia" which can cover the entire thallus.

Each goniocyst contains a few green algal cells surrounded by hyphae, with the hyphae being hyaline (translucent) and incrusted with gyrophoric acid crystals. The algal cells are about 4.5–7 μm in diameter, each containing a clear oil-drop. Apothecia (fruiting bodies) are rare; if present they are adpressed to semi-immersed in the thallus, and measure 0.1–0.5 mm in width. The apothecia are whitish to pallid and convex, lacking a distinct margin. The hymenium is 35–50 μm tall, with the paraphyses being richly branched and about 1.5–2 μm wide in the mid-hymenium.

The ascospores of Micarea viridileprosa are oblong-ellipsoid or ovovoid in shape, measuring 8–12(-14) by 2.5–4 μm, and from zero to two septa. Pycnidia are very rare and grey-brown, either sessile or stalked, measuring 20–50 μm in diameter and 50–100 μm in height. The conidia are narrowly oblong-ellipsoid to bluntly fusiform, measuring 4.5–6 by 1.3–2 μm, and are often seen extruding from the ostiole.

== Chemistry ==
The thallus and apothecia of Micarea viridileprosa test C+ (red) in spot test reaction, indicating the presence of gyrophoric acid. This chemical is also present in the apothecia, which helps distinguish it from other similar species. The pycnidial walls have an olivaceous, K+ (violet), C+ (violet) pigment.

== Habitat and distribution ==
Micarea viridileprosa is found in various habitats, including on the bark of trees such as Betula, Alnus glutinosa, Pinus sylvestris, Prunus padus, and Quercus robur. It is also found on rotting wood and soil, in open woodlands, on sloping sides of ditches, and in peat-moor habitats. The species is widespread in the Netherlands and Belgium and has been recorded in England, Wales, France, Germany, Italy, Portugal, and Switzerland.
