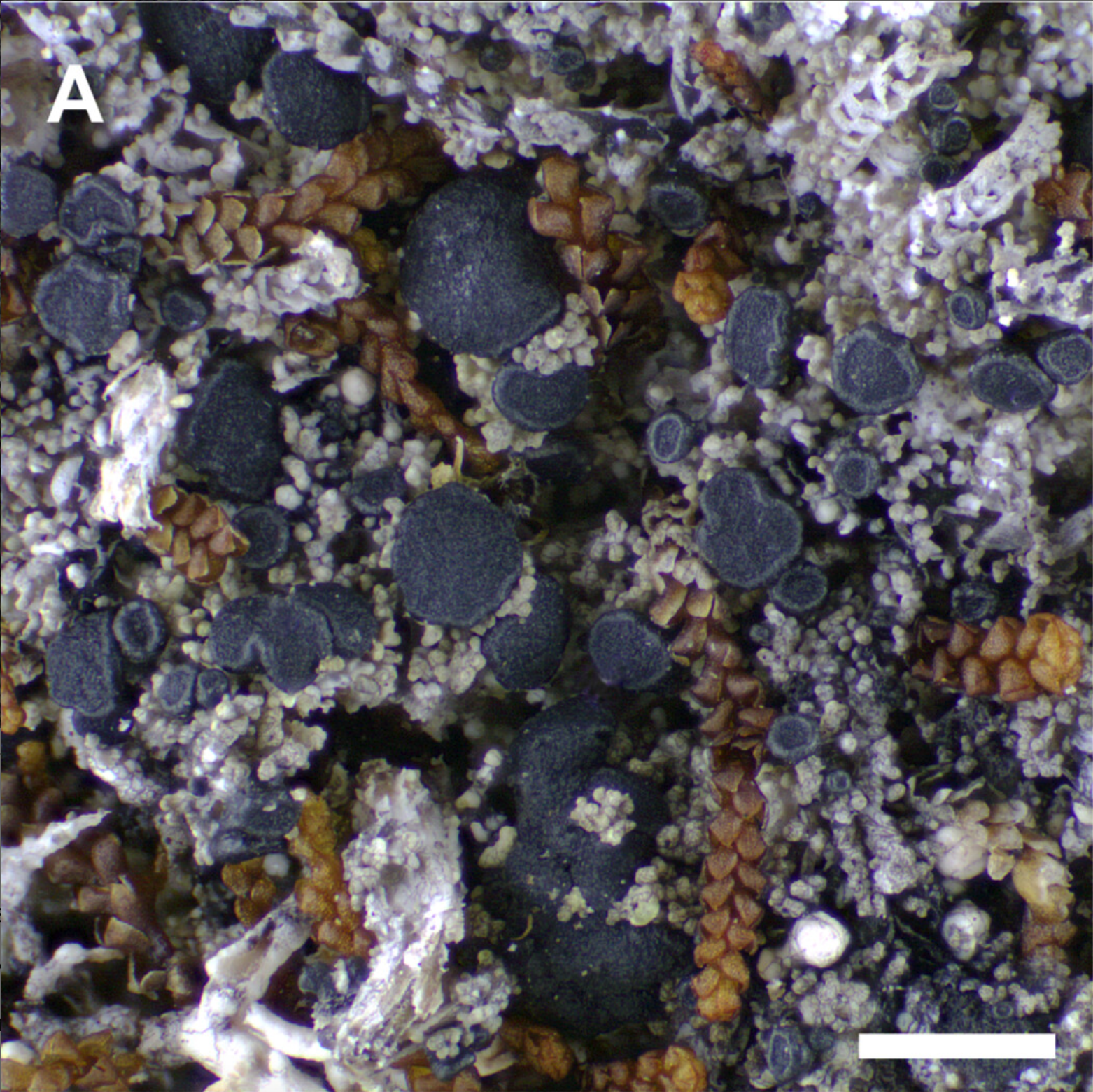
- scale: 1 mm

Scientific classification
- Kingdom: Fungi
- Division: Ascomycota
- Class: Lecanoromycetes
- Order: Lecanorales
- Family: Ectolechiaceae
- Genus: Helocarpon
- Species: H. crassipes

Binomial name
- Helocarpon crassipes Th.Fr. (1860)

Synonyms
- Lecidea crassipes (Th.Fr.) Nyl. (1862); Micarea crassipes (Th.Fr.) Coppins (1983); Helocarpon pulverulum (Th.Fr.) Türk & Hafellner (1993); Lecidea crassipes f. pulverula Th.Fr. (1874); Lecidea crassipes f. moriformis Th.Fr. (1874)

= Helocarpon crassipes =

Species of lichen-forming fungus

Helocarpon crassipes is a species of crustose lichen-forming fungus in the family Ectolechiaceae. It was first described by Theodor Magnus Fries in 1860, based on specimens from northern Norway, and serves as the type species of the genus Helocarpon. The lichen forms a thin, whitish crust and produces small, black, often stalked fruiting bodies. It is found in arctic and alpine habitats in Europe and North America, where it typically grows over mosses on exposed rocks or ground.

== Taxonomy ==
Helocarpon crassipes was described by Theodor Magnus Fries as a new species and, at the same time, used as the basis for the new genus Helocarpon. In the original account, Fries wrote that it may recall a Lecidea at first glance, but that closer examination shows it to be an unusual lichen with a distinctive form; he also remarked that, in overall appearance, it can resemble a robust Calicium. Fries reported the species growing on mosses, which it encrusts. In the protologue it was recorded from multiple localities in eastern Finnmark (far north-eastern Norway).

Later authors placed the species in Micarea, but a 2026 molecular study supported recognising Helocarpon as a separate genus. Using five genetic markers, the authors recovered Helocarpon as the sister group to the rest of Micarea (in a broad sense), and H. crassipes grouped with H. assimilatum, H. erraticum and H. paratropum within that lineage.

In their taxonomic treatment, Myllys and co-authors narrowed the lectotype to specimen S L2136, because two specimens in herbarium S share the same label data. They also concluded that Helocarpon pulverulum represents ordinary variation in thallus development within H. crassipes and treated it as a synonym.

== Description ==
The thallus is crustose and spreading (effuse), thin, and whitish, with scattered minute, wart-like granules. A distinct hypothallus is present, whitish but sometimes with a pinkish tinge, and described as having a varnished (sometimes slightly gelatinous) look. The apothecia (fruiting bodies) are black and solid, typically raised on a more-or-less thick stalk that may be straight or curved. Some apothecia can appear stalkless when the stalk is curved, immersed in the moss, and hidden. The disc is initially urn-shaped and then flattening, finally becoming convex to almost hemispherical, very black, opaque, and bare. The margin is carbonized (blackened), at first thicker and raised, later thinning and eventually rolling back. Older apothecia may become misshapen and tuberculate. The asci are club-shaped (clavate and typically contain eight simple, hyaline ascospores, usually about 13–18 μm long and about 4 μm wide; smaller spores (about 8–10 μm by about 3 μm) were also reported.

A modern summary characterises the apothecia as black, typically 0.2–0.6 mm across, and distinctly marginate and often shortly stalked when young, with a well-developed exciple. Pycnidia are reported to be rare and sessile (about 0.065–0.15 mm across), producing microconidia about 6–9 × 1–1.5 μm; no secondary lichen products have been detected.

== Habitat and distribution ==
Helocarpon crassipes is an arctic-alpine lichen that typically grows over bryophytes (including mosses). It is reported from Europe and North America. In Switzerland, H. crassipes is rare and is documented from the canton of Graubünden. It grows over mosses in cold, exposed habitats, including on wind-swept summit rocks, and it can also occur on the ground where mosses or plant debris provide a stable surface. Swiss records include a collection on humus in a subalpine spruce (Picea) forest at the Albulapass, and a later record from the Val Poschiavo area of the southern Swiss Alps at about 2,000 m, in larch and Swiss stone pine woodland.

In the Swiss Lichen Red List work, the species was evaluated using IUCN criteria and placed in the category Least Concern (LC); the authors considered that its rarity in collections does not, by itself, indicate an immediate conservation risk. In the same review, it was treated as threatened in Great Britain and Slovakia, and reported as absent from Germany, Italy, the Netherlands, Finland and Sweden.
