= Micarea cilaosensis =

Scientific classification
- Kingdom: Fungi
- Division: Ascomycota
- Class: Lecanoromycetes
- Order: Lecanorales
- Family: Ectolechiaceae
- Genus: Micarea
- Species: M. cilaosensis

Binomial name
- Micarea cilaosensis M.Brand, van den Boom & Sérus. (2014)
- Type locality: Cirque de Cilaos, Réunion

Species of lichen-forming fungus

Micarea cilaosensis is a species of lichen-forming fungus in the family Ectolechiaceae. It was described as new to science in 2014 from the tropical island of Réunion (Mascarene archipelago) in the Indian Ocean. The type collection was made in the Cirque de Cilaos, in the Forêt du Grand Matarum along the trail to Caverne Dufour, where it grew on bark of the introduced conifer Cryptomeria japonica at about 1,420 m elevation. It is known only from this locality, at the margin of disturbed natural forest, and its name refers to the Cirque de Cilaos. Index Fungorum treats the original spelling cilaoensis as an orthographic error and corrects it to cilaosensis, in accordance with the standard Latin formation of adjectival epithets from the place name Cilaos, and under the Code's provisions for mandatory correction of incorrect Latinization (ICN Art. 60).

The lichen forms a green, thin thallus (about 3 cm across) with an uneven surface of slightly convex granules. Its small apothecia are pale (whitish to greyish) and up to about 0.4 mm wide, with a pale margin and a slightly constricted base. The spores are ovoid to ellipsoid and usually 0–1-septate (about 11–12 × 4.0–4.4 μm). White, flask-shaped pycnidia are often present and produce both large, non-septate macroconidia (about 38–48 × 0.9–1.1 μm) and smaller rod-shaped (bacilliform) microconidia (about 5.2–7.1 × 0.9–1.1 μm). Chemically, it contains gyrophoric acid (C+ red) and shows a Cinereorufa-green pigment in the apothecia. It can look superficially like a Lecania because of its pale-margined apothecia, but it differs from the similar Micarea denigrata by having broader spores and much larger macroconidia.
