= Micarea sipmanii =

Scientific classification
- Kingdom: Fungi
- Division: Ascomycota
- Class: Lecanoromycetes
- Order: Lecanorales
- Family: Ectolechiaceae
- Genus: Micarea
- Species: M. sipmanii

Binomial name
- Micarea sipmanii Sérus. & Coppins (2009)
- Holotype site: Basse-Terre Island, West Indies

Species of lichen-forming fungus

Micarea sipmanii is a rare species of corticolous (bark-dwelling) lichen in the family Ectolechiaceae. Described in 2009 from a specimen collected on Basse-Terre Island in Guadeloupe, this lichen forms thin crusts of whitish to bluish-grey granules on smooth tree bark in wet montane rainforest. It is distinguished by its distinctive reproductive structures that resemble tiny branched trees up to 2.2 mm tall, each topped with an inflated head containing thread-like ascospores.

== Taxonomy ==
Micarea sipmanii was described in 2009 by Emmanuël Sérusiaux and Brian John Coppins, based on a specimen collected in April 1995 on Basse-Terre Island (Guadeloupe). The holotype was taken from a wet montane rainforest ridge at 820 m elevation along the Rivière du Grand Carbet. Molecular and morphological traits place the species within the M. peliocarpa–alabastrites–cinerea group of Micarea, a clade characterised by bluish pigments, multiseptate spores and filiform (threadlike) conidia. The authors named the fungus in honour of the Dutch lichenologist Harrie Sipman, to whom the paper was dedicated.

== Description ==
The lichen forms a very thin, cortex-lacking (ecorticate) crust of whitish- to bluish-grey granules, each usually less than 0.1 mm across, scattered or loosely clustered on smooth bark. The thallus contains gyrophoric acid, giving a C+ (red) reaction, while spot tests are otherwise negative.

Apothecia may be absent or abundant. When present they are 0.1–0.5 mm wide, convex to hemispherical, often tuberculate and proliferating over older discs; the margin is lacking and the disc ranges from pale orange-brown to bluish-grey. The exciple is reduced, composed of branched hyphae; the hymenium is 50–65 μm high and stains reddish in nitric acid. Asci (usually eight-spored) are 40–55 × 12–15 μm and amyloid; the oblong-fusiform ascospores are 7-septate, 27–33 × 4–4.5 μm.

Asexual structures are striking: numerous arbuscular (shrub- or treelike) pycnidia stand on delicate, often branched stalks 1.4–2.2 mm long, each bearing an inflated, rostrate head up to 0.3 mm wide that is thinly hairy and translucent. The pycnidium cavity is packed with filiform conidia, 44–52 × 1–1.2 μm, mostly aseptate (lacking internal partitions, or septa) but occasionally 1–3-septate.

== Habitat and distribution ==
The species is known only from the type locality on Basse-Terre, Guadeloupe, where it grows on the vertical trunk of a smooth-barked tree in extremely wet, mid-elevation rainforest near the famous Chutes du Carbet waterfalls. Despite later surveys in similar habitats on the island, no additional populations have been found.
