= Micarea borbonica =

Scientific classification
- Kingdom: Fungi
- Division: Ascomycota
- Class: Lecanoromycetes
- Order: Lecanorales
- Family: Ectolechiaceae
- Genus: Micarea
- Species: M. borbonica

Binomial name
- Micarea borbonica M.Brand, van den Boom & Sérus. (2014)

Species of lichen-forming fungus

Micarea borbonica is a species of lichen-forming fungus in the family Ectolechiaceae. It was described as new to science in 2014 from the tropical island of Réunion (Mascarene archipelago) in the Indian Ocean. The type collection was made on the slopes west-northwest of Piton de la Fournaise, along the road to Bourg-Murat, at about 1,970 m elevation, where it grew on bark of Sophora (S. denudata) in a small montane forest. On Réunion it occurs across much of the montane forest zone (both natural and human-modified sites), where it has been found on a range of native and introduced trees, on branches of Erica, and on decorticated wood, from about 800 to 2,000 m. The specific epithet borbonica refers to the island's former French name, Île Bourbon.

The lichen forms a small, dull white to pale greenish thallus (to about 1.5 cm across) that is uneven and may appear granular, with some granules resembling tiny isidia. Its pale apothecia are small (to about 0.5 mm wide) and range from whitish to pale brownish or bluish grey, with fusiform spores that are typically 3–7-septate (about 15–27 × 3.0–4.1 μm) and often slightly curved. The species also produces conspicuous macropycnidia with strongly sigmoid macroconidia (about 30–42 × 1.0–1.3 μm). Chemically, it contains gyrophoric acid and methylhiascic acid (C+ red), and its apothecia include a cinereorufa-green pigment. The combination of its spore and conidial characters and this chemistry is used to separate it from similar Réunion species such as Micarea peliocarpa and M. cinerea.
