= Micarea melanoprasina =

Scientific classification
- Kingdom: Fungi
- Division: Ascomycota
- Class: Lecanoromycetes
- Order: Lecanorales
- Family: Ectolechiaceae
- Genus: Micarea
- Species: M. melanoprasina

Binomial name
- Micarea melanoprasina M.Brand, van den Boom & Sérus. (2014)
- Type locality: Réserve naturelle de la Roche Écrite, Réunion

Species of lichen-forming fungus

Micarea melanoprasina is a species of lichen-forming fungus in the family Ectolechiaceae. It was described as new to science in 2014 from the tropical island of Réunion (Mascarene archipelago) in the Indian Ocean. The type collection was made in the Réserve naturelle de la Roche Écrite, on the track to the summit, where it grew on the trunk of Acacia heterophylla in montane rainforest at about 1,500 m elevation. On Réunion it has been found at elevations between about 1,400 and 1,900 m, growing on tree trunks and on the branches of shrubs (including Dombeya, Gaertnera, and Chassalia).

The lichen forms a pale green body (thallus) up to about 5 cm across, composed of fine, coral-like granules (goniocysts—tiny clusters of algal cells wrapped in fungal hyphae) that grow on a distinctive bluish-black border zone (prothallus). Its fruiting bodies (apothecia) are grey to black, very small (about 0.12–0.15 mm wide), convex, and lack a visible rim. The spores are oval-oblong to slightly club-shaped, undivided or 2-celled (0–1-septate), about 8–10 × 4–5 μm, with the cross-wall offset towards the broader end. An occasional asexual stage is present as tiny sunken pycnidia producing short rod-shaped conidia (asexual spores). The thallus contains an unidentified chemical (negative in K, P, and C spot tests), and both thallus and apothecia contain a Cinereorufa-green pigment. These features, together with the dark prothallus and finely coral-like thallus, were used to distinguish it from similar members of the Micarea prasina group (including M. subviridescens, which has larger spores and produces prasinic acid).
