= Micarea fennica =

Scientific classification
- Kingdom: Fungi
- Division: Ascomycota
- Class: Lecanoromycetes
- Order: Lecanorales
- Family: Ectolechiaceae
- Genus: Micarea
- Species: M. fennica

Binomial name
- Micarea fennica A.Launis & Myllys (2019)

Species of lichen-forming fungus

Micarea fennica is a species of lichen in the family Ectolechiaceae. Originally found in Finland, it was formally described as a new species in 2019 by lichenogists Annina Launis and Leena Myllis. The type specimen was discovered in an old growth forest in Kalajanvuori, Rautalampi, (Pohjois-Häme, Finland). Here it was found growing on the softened wood of a standing dead Pinus sylvestris, along with Micarea prasina.

== Description ==
The lichen has a pale olive-green thallus comprising tiny green granules spread out on the surface of its woody substrate. These granules are goniocysts (small, roughly spherical aggregations of photobiont cells surrounded by hyphae) measuring 17–25 μm in diameter. Pycnidia (asexual fruiting bodies) are dark grey to dark brown and occur on small stalks up to 1 mm tall.

A molecular phylogenetic analysis of several Micarea species showed Micarea fennica to be most closely related to M. prasina (the type species of genus Micarea), and, like other species in the M. prasina species complex, Micarea fennica contains micareic acid. M. prasina does not have stalked pycnidia.

== Habitat and distribution ==
Until recently, Micarea fennica was known only from a couple of locations in Finland, where it grows in old growth forest. It probably needs the late decay stages of dead wood, such as that provided by the slow-decaying Pinus sylvestris stumps. The authors suggest that it is likely a rare species and may be under threat of extinction due to forest management practices that remove its substrate. In 2021, the lichen was recorded from several locations in the Russian Far East, namely Siberia, and Kamchatka. Its substrates in these locations were softwood stumps and bark of Larix gmelinii and Picea abies.
