= Micarea termitophila =

Scientific classification
- Kingdom: Fungi
- Division: Ascomycota
- Class: Lecanoromycetes
- Order: Lecanorales
- Family: Ectolechiaceae
- Genus: Micarea
- Species: M. termitophila

Binomial name
- Micarea termitophila Aptroot & M.Cáceres (2014)
- Holotype: Fazenda São Francisco, Brazil

Species of lichen-forming

Micarea termitophila is a species of lichen-forming fungus in the family Ectolechiaceae. It grows on the soil of termite nests in Brazil.

== Taxonomy ==
The lichen Micarea termitophila was formally described by the lichenologists André Aptroot and Marcela Cáceres in 2014. The holotype, collected from a black termite nest in Amazonas, Brazil, is preserved at the ISE herbarium (Federal University of Sergipe), with an isotype at ABL (University of Groningen).

== Description ==
The thallus of Micarea termitophila is corticate and plicate with a greenish hue, approximately 50 mm thick, and has a dull and roughened surface texture. The thallus houses myrmecioid algae, about 2–4 mm in diameter, beneath a thin, hyaline cortex.The authors note that it somewhat resembles a crustose Stereocaulon in thallus form.

Apothecia (fruiting bodies) are appressed, emerging between the thallus granules and often becoming prominent, measuring 0.2–0.3 mm in diameter. They are typically round or lobate, featuring a convex, dull, black disc. The hymenium is clear, ranging from 30 to 50 μm in height and turns violet when treated with potassium hydroxide (KOH) solution, especially noticeable in the upper parts. The hypothecium is purplish-brown, turning orange-brown with KOH. This species produces 8-spored asci and pyriform, aseptate, hyaline ascospores measuring 7–9 by 3.0–3.5 μm. Pycnidia are found on the same thallus, often grouped separately, with black, bacilliform conidia measuring about 4–5 by 1 μm.

Chemical tests on the thallus, including UV light and various spot tests (C, K, KC, P), are negative, and no lichen products have been detected with thin-layer chromatography.

== Habitat and distribution ==
At the time of its original publication, Micarea termitophila was known only to occur only in its type locality in Brazil, where it grows on termite nests attached to trees within primary rainforests.
