= Micarea tenuispora =

Scientific classification
- Kingdom: Fungi
- Division: Ascomycota
- Class: Lecanoromycetes
- Order: Lecanorales
- Family: Ectolechiaceae
- Genus: Micarea
- Species: M. tenuispora

Binomial name
- Micarea tenuispora M.Brand, van den Boom & Sérus. (2014)
- Type locality: Forêt du Grand Matarum, Réunion

Species of lichen-forming fungus

Micarea tenuispora is a species of bark-dwelling, lichen-forming fungus in the family Ectolechiaceae. It was described as new to science in 2014 from the tropical island of Réunion (Mascarene archipelago) in the Indian Ocean. The type collection was made in the Cirque de Cilaos, in the Forêt du Grand Matarum along the trail to Caverne Dufour. It was found there growing on bark of the introduced conifer Cryptomeria japonica in montane forest at about 1,420 m elevation. On Réunion it has been recorded at the edges of disturbed natural forests between about 1,200 and 1,500 m, always on Cryptomeria bark. The species epithet tenuispora refers to its very slender ascospores.

The lichen forms a thin, patchy body (thallus), up to about 5 cm across, that is pale greenish to brownish. The surface bears scattered small patches (areoles) that soon develop into short, cylindrical to coral-like (coralloid) outgrowths (up to about 0.3 mm high), resembling isidia. Its fruiting bodies (apothecia) are dark grey to black and small (up to about 0.9 mm wide), containing very narrow, needle-like spores that are typically divided into 4–6 cells (3–5-septate) and measure about 31–35 × 2.2–2.5 μm. Chemically, it produces gyrophoric acid (giving a red reaction in the C spot test), and it was distinguished from other Micarea species on Réunion by the combination of its outgrowth-bearing thallus and its unusually long, thin, multi-celled spores.
