= Micarea melaeniza =

Scientific classification
- Kingdom: Fungi
- Division: Ascomycota
- Class: Lecanoromycetes
- Order: Lecanorales
- Family: Pilocarpaceae
- Genus: Micarea
- Species: M. melaeniza

Binomial name
- Micarea melaeniza Hedl., 1892

Species of fungus

Micarea melaeniza is a species of fungus belonging to the family Pilocarpaceae.

It is native to Europe.
