= Micarea alectorialica =

Scientific classification
- Kingdom: Fungi
- Division: Ascomycota
- Class: Lecanoromycetes
- Order: Lecanorales
- Family: Ectolechiaceae
- Genus: Micarea
- Species: M. alectorialica

Binomial name
- Micarea alectorialica M.Brand, van den Boom & Sérus. (2014)
- Type locality: Forêt de Bébour, Réunion

Species of lichen-forming fungus

Micarea alectorialica is a species of bark-dwelling, lichen-forming fungus in the family Ectolechiaceae. It was described as new to science in 2014 from the tropical island of Réunion (Mascarene archipelago) in the Indian Ocean. The type collection was made in the Forêt de Bébour, in wet montane ericoid (heather-family) thickets, where it grew on stems of Erica at about 1,890 m elevation. On Réunion it has been recorded mainly from similar high-elevation thickets around 1,900–2,000 m, where it is reported to be abundant.

The lichen forms a pale, areolate thallus (to about 5 cm across) in which the small areoles break open into convex soralia (usually up to about 0.6 mm across) that are white to pale greenish. The powdery soredia are roughly 25–35 μm wide. Its shiny black apothecia (fruiting bodies) are convex and small (to about 0.7 mm across) and the spores are fusiform, typically 1–3-septate (about 17–20 × 4.5–5.6 μm). Chemically, the species is characterized by the presence of alectorialic acid (with a C+ red reaction and K+ yellow, P+ yellow) and it also contains a fatty acid. These features help separate it from most other Micarea species, which rarely produce alectorialic acid. The species epithet alectorialica alludes to this characteristic feature.
