= Micarea hypoviolascens =

Scientific classification
- Kingdom: Fungi
- Division: Ascomycota
- Class: Lecanoromycetes
- Order: Lecanorales
- Family: Ectolechiaceae
- Genus: Micarea
- Species: M. hypoviolascens

Binomial name
- Micarea hypoviolascens Czarnota & Coppins (2005)

Species of lichen-forming fungus

Micarea hypoviolascens is a species of wood-dwelling crustose lichen in the family Ectolechiaceae. Found in Scotland, it was described as a new species in 2005. It is the second Micarea species with the olivaceous, K+ (deep violet) pigment (Sedifolia-grey) in the hypothecium. It forms a greyish-green crust on wood and produces small, convex, blackish fruiting bodies. The species is known only from ancient oak woodland in the western Scottish Highlands and remains very rare across Europe.

== Taxonomy ==
Micarea hypoviolascens was described as a new species in 2005 by Paweł Czarnota and Brian Coppins, based on material collected in ancient oak woodland in Argyll (western Scotland), where it was growing on hard wood of a deciduous stump close to the ground. The species epithet hypoviolascens refers to the hypothecium (the tissue below the spore-bearing layer) and to the violet reaction shown by that layer when stained with potassium hydroxide solution (the K test).

The species is distinctive within Micarea because an olivaceous pigment (Sedifolia-grey) is concentrated throughout the hypothecium, producing a strong K+ violet (and C+ violet) reaction. Among described species, this pigment distribution has otherwise been reported only in the South African Micarea endoviolascens, but that species has larger, corticate areoles, larger apothecia, differently formed pycnidia, and a terricolous habit.

== Description ==
The thallus of Micarea hypoviolascens forms an uneven, greyish-green to greenish-white crust of shallow, usually contiguous areoles, typically 40–200 micrometres (μm) across. It may be partly endoxylic (developing within the wood) or mostly superficial, and the areoles are about 100–180(–200) μm thick in section. A true cortex is absent, although some areoles have a thin, hyaline surface layer. The photobiont is a "micareoid" green alga with spherical cells about 3.5–7 μm in diameter.

Apothecia are usually numerous and may be crowded in small groups; they are immarginate and strongly convex, often becoming pinched at the base and sometimes almost spherical. They are grey when young but soon darken to black with a greyish tinge, typically 0.1–0.25 mm in diameter (occasionally to about 0.4 mm). The hymenium is 30–40 μm tall and reacts violet with K and C. The epithecium is not clearly delimited, but may appear pale brownish from pigmented paraphysis tips. Asci are 8-spored and of the Micarea-type, and the ascospores are oblong-ellipsoid, usually with two oil droplets, undivided or have a single internal crosswall (0–1-septate). They measure about 10–12 μm long, occasionally reaching 13.4 μm, and 3–4 μm wide, occasionally reaching 4.3 μm.

The hypothecium is olive to olive-brown and gives an intense K+ (violet) reaction, especially in the lower part, and a C+ (violet) reaction. Pycnidia are partly immersed in the areoles or become sessile. They are spherical with a wide ostiole (opening), and their wall contains the same violet-reacting pigment. Conidia are bacilliform and about 9–11.5 × 1.3–2.1 μm.

Standard thallus spot tests are negative (K, C, KC, Pd, UV), although thin-layer chromatography has detected an unidentified substance (Rf class 6 in solvent system A). In the field, the species can resemble other lignicolous Micarea with black, immarginate apothecia and a thin, whitish-green thallus (such as M. melaena, M. lignaria and sometimes M. denigrata), but those species have different anatomy and pigmentation, and their thalli give positive reactions (C+ red or Pd+ red) that are absent in M. hypoviolascens.

== Habitat and distribution ==
Micarea hypoviolascens is confirmed only from the type locality in the western Scottish Highlands, where the climate is strongly influenced by the Atlantic and is mild, very wet, and humid. It was found in a narrow belt of ancient woodland dominated by Quercus petraea on the west bank of a sea loch, growing on hard wood of a deciduous stump near the ground. Associated species recorded with it include Micarea alabastrites, M. melaena, Lichenomphalia umbellifera and Placynthiella icmalea.

In an environmental DNA survey of epiphytic lichens in the Czech Republic, it was represented by a single mitochondrial small subunit ribosomal DNA (mtSSU) from an upper montane site that was 98% identical to a Scottish reference barcode. The authors treated this identification as uncertain, because a 98% match could indicate an undescribed close relative; the lack of corresponding detections in internal transcribed spacer (ITS) data also points in that direction, and the species has not yet been found in the Czech Republic by specimen-based surveys.
