= Micarea farinosa =

Scientific classification
- Kingdom: Fungi
- Division: Ascomycota
- Class: Lecanoromycetes
- Order: Lecanorales
- Family: Ectolechiaceae
- Genus: Micarea
- Species: M. farinosa

Binomial name
- Micarea farinosa Coppins & Aptroot (2008)

Species of lichen-forming fungus

Micarea farinosa is a species of saxicolous (rock-dwelling) lichen in the family Ectolechiaceae. It forms light green, powdery patches on rocks and soil in sheltered woodland spots like tree bases and dry rock overhangs. Originally discovered in Welsh woodland in 2008, it has since been found across western Europe and as far away as South Korea.

== Taxonomy ==
Micarea farinosa was described as new to science by Brian J. Coppins and André Aptroot in 2008. The holotype was collected in Wales (Ceredigion) from sheltered shale fragments at the base of a tree in old woodland. It was distinguished from the similar M. lithinella by its powdery (farinose) thallus, smaller apothecia, and smaller, simple spores; pale-fruited Micarea myriocarpa can look similar in the field, but has a more scurfy granular thallus, typically narrower and often 1-septate spores, and a reddish to orange-brown hypothecium.

== Description ==
The thallus is light green and distinctly farinose, i.e., made of tiny mealy granules. Microscopically these granules are goniocysts, small spherical packets of the alga and fungal hyphae, 12–18 micrometres (μm) in diameter (sometimes merging into granules up to about 35 μm). The outer hyphae are colourless and the algal cells are 4–7 μm across.

Apothecia (disc-like fruiting bodies) are very small, usually 0.15–0.3 mm across, pale orange to orange-brown, and convex to nearly spherical; they are immarginate (lacking a distinct rim). The apothecial rim tissue (exciple) is poorly developed and colourless; the ascospore-bearing layer (hymenium) is 24–30 μm high, with a colourless upper surface (epihymenium) and a clear lower layer (hypothecium). The supporting threads (paraphyses) are scanty, branched, 1–1.5 μm wide (to 2 μm at the tips), with a few stouter threads up to 3 μm. Asci measure 27–30 × 7–10 μm and contain simple (non-septate), colourless spores that are ovoid to oblong-ellipsoid, 5–7.5 × 2–3.4 μm. No asexual fruiting bodies (pycnidia) have been seen, and thin-layer chromatography detected no lichen products.

== Habitat and distribution ==
Micarea farinosa grows on acidic rock or consolidated soil, and sometimes over dying mosses, in sheltered microhabitats such as dry overhangs, recesses at tree bases, and the soil of upended root plates. Confirmed records are from south-west England (Cornwall), Wales (Ceredigion and Radnorshire), and western Scotland (Wigtownshire and Argyll). It is also found in France, Sweden, and the Netherlands. Its known distribution was increased considerably in 2016 when it was recorded from Jangseong County in South Korea.
