= Micarea hyalinoxanthonica =

Scientific classification
- Kingdom: Fungi
- Division: Ascomycota
- Class: Lecanoromycetes
- Order: Lecanorales
- Family: Ectolechiaceae
- Genus: Micarea
- Species: M. hyalinoxanthonica

Binomial name
- Micarea hyalinoxanthonica M.Brand, van den Boom & Sérus. (2014)
- Type locality: Sentier de Takamaka, Réunion

Species of lichen-forming fungus

Micarea hyalinoxanthonica is a species of lichen-forming fungus in the family Ectolechiaceae. It was described as new to science in 2014 from the tropical island of Réunion (Mascarene archipelago) in the Indian Ocean. The type collection was made in the Forêt de Bébour, along the Sentier de Takamaka, where it grew on a Dombeya tree in montane forest at about 1,380 m elevation. It is known only from the type locality, where it was reported growing over decaying bryophytes (including liverworts) on the tree bole. The species epithet hyalinoxanthonica refers to the xanthone compound produced by the species and to a distinctive feature of its apothecia, which become translucent (hyaline) when moist.

The lichen forms a thin, pale greenish thallus up to about 3 cm across that is made of dense goniocysts (small clusters of algal cells wrapped in fungal hyphae), giving it a soft, felty appearance. Its apothecia (fruiting bodies) are abundant, pale beige, and become translucent when wet. They are small (usually 0.1–0.5 mm, rarely to about 0.6 mm wide) and contain 8 bacilliform spores per ascus that are typically 3-septate (about 13.2–17.0 × 3.2–3.6 μm) and visibly constricted at the septa. The species produces a xanthone (reported as thiophanic acid), giving a K+ (yellow) and C+/KC+ (orange) reaction, with crystals present in the thallus and apothecia. It was compared with other xanthone-producing Micarea such as M. xanthonica and M. isabellina.
