= Micarea capitata =

Scientific classification
- Kingdom: Fungi
- Division: Ascomycota
- Class: Lecanoromycetes
- Order: Lecanorales
- Family: Ectolechiaceae
- Genus: Micarea
- Species: M. capitata

Binomial name
- Micarea capitata M.Svenss. & G.Thor (2011)
- Holotype: Mt. Ramundberget, Sweden

Species of lichen-forming fungus

Micarea capitata is a species of moss-dwelling lichen in the family Ectolechiaceae. Described in 2011 from Härjedalen in north-western Sweden, this rarely recorded lichen is characterised by minute black apothecia with a distinctly constricted base and a mottled, darkly pigmented hypothecium. The species grows on shoots of the pleurocarpous moss Hylocomium splendens on rocks in open forests, where it forms an extremely thin, pale grey crust that is easily overlooked in the field.

== Taxonomy ==
Micarea capitata was described as a new species by Måns Svensson and Göran Thor from material collected in Härjedalen (north-western Sweden) in 2007. The holotype was gathered on the pleurocarpous moss Hylocomium splendens growing on a boulder in a subalpine deciduous woodland on the eastern slope of Mt. Ramundberget (Tännäs parish; 730 m elevation).

The species name capitata refers to its rounded, head-like apothecia (the small, disc-shaped fruiting bodies). In their discussion, Svensson and Thor emphasized a combination of characters that separates M. capitata from similar Micarea species: its very small, black apothecia with a distinctly constricted base; ascospores that are usually 1-septate (occasionally non-septate); and a mottled, darkly pigmented hypothecium (a tissue layer beneath the spore-producing layer). They considered it hard to place in existing informal groupings within Micarea because of its unusual apothecial pigment, though they suggested it might be related to species in Coppins's "Group H", which shares minute black apothecia, 0–1-septate spores, and a thin thallus lacking detectable lichen substances.

== Description ==
The thallus is crustose and forms small patches over shoots of Hylocomium splendens. It is often extremely thin and may be difficult to see, but where visible it is pale grey. The apothecia are numerous and scattered; they are black, convex to hemispherical, and typically 0.15–0.25 mm across (overall range 0.10–0.35 mm), with the base narrowed where each apothecium attaches to the substrate.

Microscopically, the photobiont is micareoid in form, with spherical cells about 4–7 μm across. The hymenium (spore-bearing layer) is about 30–40 μm tall and is usually streaked blue-green. The asci are 8-spored, and the ascospores are hyaline, ellipsoid, and typically 9–11 × 3–4 μm, usually with a single septum. The paraphyses are branched and interconnected, embedded in a gel that does not dissolve in potassium hydroxide solution, and the hypothecium is blackish green and distinctly mottled because the pigment is patchily distributed. No lichen substances were detected by thin-layer chromatography; standard spot tests and ultraviolet light were negative. The authors reported that the blue-green apothecial pigment resembles (but is not identical to) the insoluble pigment Cinereorufa-green as described in the pigment literature.

In the field, M. capitata may be confused with other tiny, black-apotheciate Micarea species on bryophytes. It is especially similar to M. hylocomii, and also compared it with M. olivacea, which differs in lacking a distinctly constricted apothecial base and in having an olivaceous pigment that is K+ (green) in the hymenium and hypothecium, along with abundant pycnidia.

== Habitat and distribution ==
Micarea capitata is known only from two sites in Härjedalen in north-western Sweden. In both cases it grew on Hylocomium splendens on rocks in open forest. The type collection came from a boulder in subalpine deciduous woodland dominated by Betula pubescens, and the second record was made beside a stream in an old-growth Picea abies forest, where it grew on the vertical face of a boulder.

At both localities the lichen was found on one- to three-year-old shoots of its moss host, often on yellowing shoots that appeared to be dying, which suggests the occupied substrate is short-lived. Svensson and Thor therefore suggested the species may rely on frequent dispersal to establish on new shoots. They also cautioned that it is easily overlooked: in the field it may appear only as a slight discolouration of Hylocomium, and it can resemble other small organisms on mosses when viewed with a hand lens. Although the host moss is common in Fennoscandia and the authors suspected the lichen might be more widespread than the few records suggest, later targeted searches in northern Sweden (2008–2010) and a revision of relevant herbarium material did not yield additional specimens. They proposed that fruiting bodies may be most frequent in spring, making summer and autumn surveys less effective. The fact that it occurs on apparently still-living host shoots led them to suggest it may have a parasitic life strategy comparable to that proposed for some other bryophyte-associated lichens. Micarea capitata was later reported as new to Norway, based on a small patch found on a moss-covered, leaning trunk of living rowan (Sorbus aucuparia) in humid old-growth woodland on the island of Meløya (Nordland). The lichen grew with both Hylocomium splendens and Hypnum cupressiforme, and the site was described as sheltered by boulders and rock walls that help maintain a moist microclimate.
