= Micarea phylicae =

Scientific classification
- Kingdom: Fungi
- Division: Ascomycota
- Class: Lecanoromycetes
- Order: Lecanorales
- Family: Ectolechiaceae
- Genus: Micarea
- Species: M. phylicae

Binomial name
- Micarea phylicae (Øvstedal) Myllys & Kantvilas (2026)

Synonyms
- Szczawinskia phylicae Øvstedal (2010)

Species of lichen-forming fungus

Micarea phylicae is a species of crustose lichen in the family Ectolechiaceae. Found in the Tristan da Cunha–Gough Island, it was described as a new species in 2010 by Dag Øvstedal, as Szczawinskia phylicae. The type specimen was collected during the Norwegian Tristan da Cunha expedition of 1937–1938. Captain Erling Christophersen and botanical assistant Yngvar Mejland found the specimen above Sandy Point in Tristan da Cunha, where it was growing on Island Cape myrtle (Phylica arborea) at an altitude of 300 m (980 ft). The species was reclassified in the genus Micarea in 2026.
