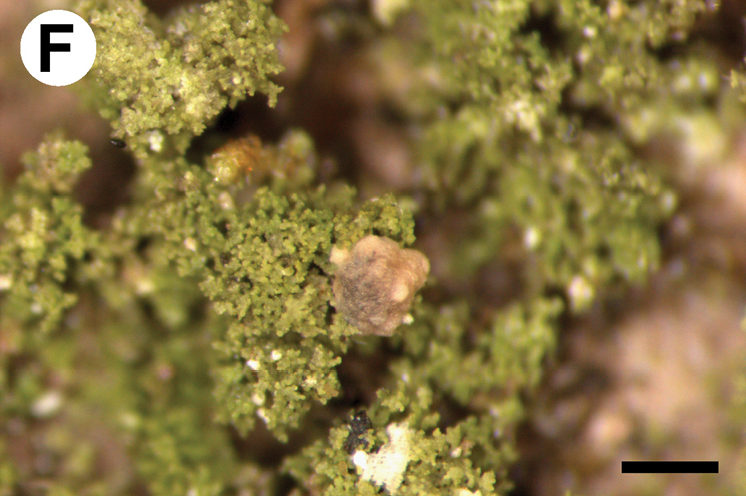

Scientific classification
- Kingdom: Fungi
- Division: Ascomycota
- Class: Lecanoromycetes
- Order: Lecanorales
- Family: Ectolechiaceae
- Genus: Micarea
- Species: M. pauli

Binomial name
- Micarea pauli Guzow-Krzemińska, A.Łubek & M.Kukwa (2019)

= Micarea pauli =

Species of lichen-forming fungus

Micarea pauli is a species of corticolous and lignicolous (bark- and wood-dwelling), crustose lichen in the family Ectolechiaceae. It is only known to occur in Poland's Białowieża Forest.

== Taxonomy ==
The lichen was formally described as a new species in 2019 by Beata Guzow-Krzemińska, Ann Łubek, and Martin Kukwa. The type specimen was collected by the third author from Białowieża Forest in Białowieża National Park (Równina Bielska); there it was found growing on an Alnus glutinosa tree. The species epithet pauli refers to Polish lichenologist Paweł Czarnota, who, according to the authors, is a "specialist in the genus who monographed it in Poland".

== Description ==
Micarea pauli has an indeterminate crustose thallus that grows within or on its bark substrate, appearing as a greenish film. The thallus, which lacks a prothallus, comprises tiny areoles about 0.1 mm in diameter that develop branched and coral-like (coralloid) isidia that are densely packed to form a nearly continuous layer over the thallus. Apothecia occur rarely; when present, they are beige with spots of grey pigment measuring up to 0.5 mm in diameter. Asci contains eight spores and measure 30–35 by 9–12 μm. The ascospores range in shape from ovoid, to ellipsoidal, to oblong, and have dimensions of 7–13 by 3.5–4.5 μm; some of them have a single septum. Micarea pauli contains methoxymicareic acid, a lichen product that can be detected using thin-layer chromatography.

Micarea aeruginoprasina and M. nigra are somewhat similar in morphology, but can be distinguished from M. pauli by differences in apothecial pigmentation.

== Habitat and distribution ==
Micarea pauli is only known to occur from a few locations in the Białowieża Forest. Most specimens have been recorded on the bark of Alnus glutinosa, but it has also been found on the bark of Tilia cordata and on decorticated wood.
