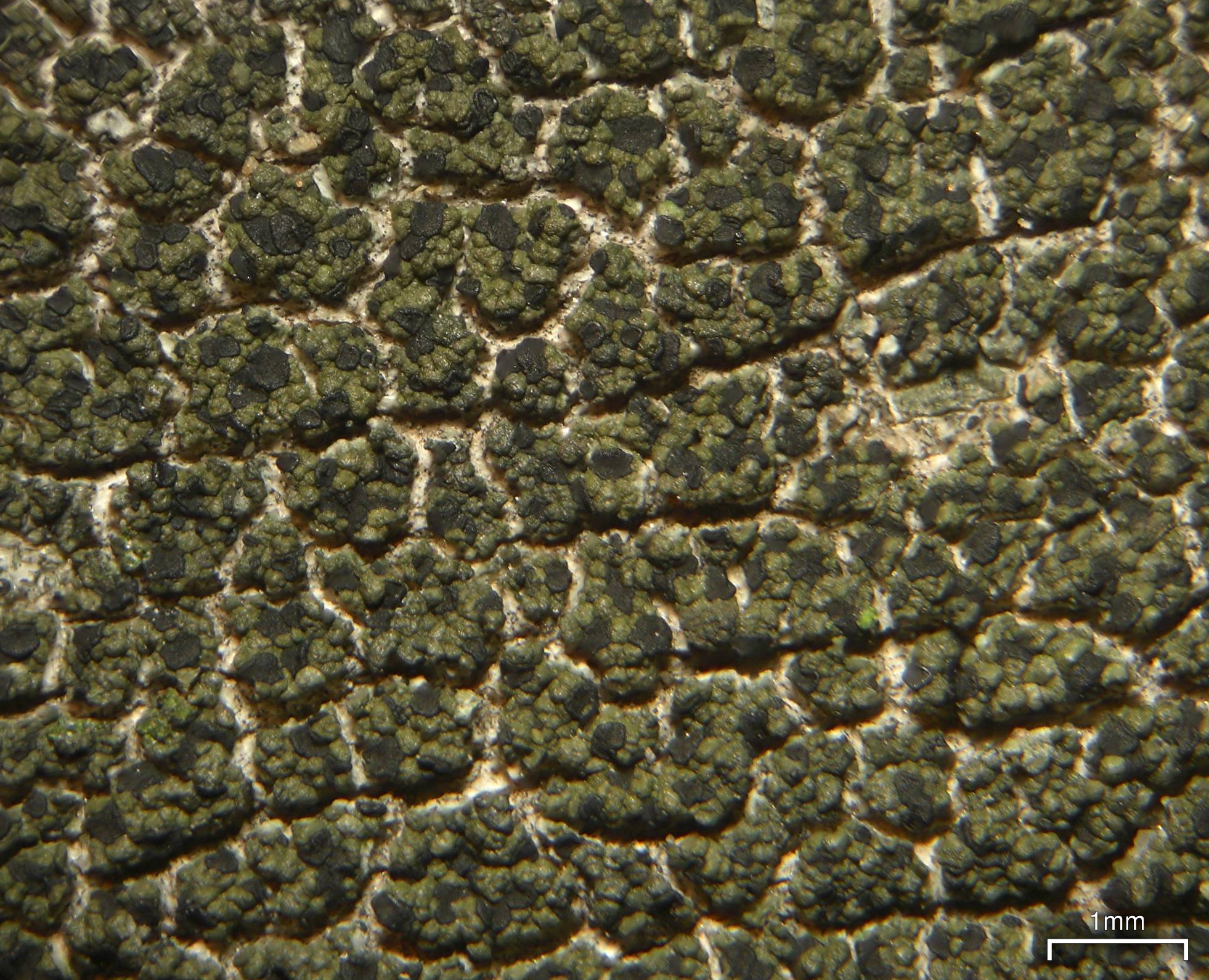
- Helocarpon erraticum

Scientific classification
- Kingdom: Fungi
- Division: Ascomycota
- Class: Lecanoromycetes
- Order: Lecanorales
- Family: Ectolechiaceae
- Genus: Helocarpon; Th.Fr. (1860)

Type species
- Helocarpon crassipes Th.Fr. (1860)

Species
- H. assimilatum H. crassipes H. erraticum H. paratropum

Synonyms
- Leimonis R.C.Harris (2009)

= Helocarpon =

Genus of lichen-forming fungi

Helocarpon is a genus of lichen-forming fungi in the family Ectolechiaceae. It contains a small number of crustose species that occur mainly in cool, northern and montane environments, where they grow on soil or rock. The genus is closely related to Micarea, but differs in a suite of morphological traits and is treated as a distinct lineage in modern multilocus classifications. Species in the genus are associated with cool climates and are found mainly in arctic, subarctic, and alpine regions, where they grow on soil or rock. The genus was proposed by Theodor Magnus Fries in 1860, and a major molecular study published in 2026 confirmed it as a distinct lineage separate from Micarea.

== Taxonomy ==
Helocarpon was established by Theodor Magnus Fries in 1860, with H. crassipes assigned as the type species. Its placement has shifted between classifications. In morphology-based systems its wider relationships were uncertain, and Josef Hafellner introduced the monogeneric family Helocarpaceae in 1984 to accommodate the genus. Some later outline classifications instead placed Helocarpon in Micareaceae alongside Micarea and other superficially similar crustose lichens.

Authors also differed on rank and circumscription: some retained Helocarpon as a distinct genus, whereas others treated it within a broad Micarea concept (for example, in a European revision that grouped H. crassipes with morphologically similar Micarea species). Early molecular work added noise rather than clarity because a mitochondrial-rDNA sequence attributed to H. crassipes was later shown to represent a species of Bryobilimbia; together with limited taxon sampling, this contributed to conflicting placements in the early literature.

A comprehensive five-locus phylogeny published in 2026 recovered Helocarpon as a strongly supported clade that is sister to Micarea in a broad sense, and treated it as a separate genus rather than as the earliest-diverging branch of Micarea. In that treatment, several species long placed in Micarea were recombined into Helocarpon, and the monotypic genus Leimonis (described for the saxicolous Lecidea/Micarea species erratica) was reduced to synonymy with Helocarpon. Although Micarea lynceola was transferred to Leimonis in 2017, the 2026 study did not support erratica and lynceola as a monophyletic pair in mtSSU analyses and treated lynceola as part of a separate Micarea lineage rather than within Helocarpon. The same study also treated Helocarpon pulverulum as a synonym of H. crassipes, interpreting it as part of a continuum of thallus development rather than as a separate species.

The 2026 revision discussed additional taxa that might prove related to Helocarpon but were not formally transferred because of missing or inconclusive data. For example, the placement of Micarea doliiformis was treated as unresolved despite an apparent relationship in some single-locus analyses, and other species (such as the North American Micarea subalpina) were flagged as potentially relevant but in need of targeted sampling and sequencing.

== Description ==
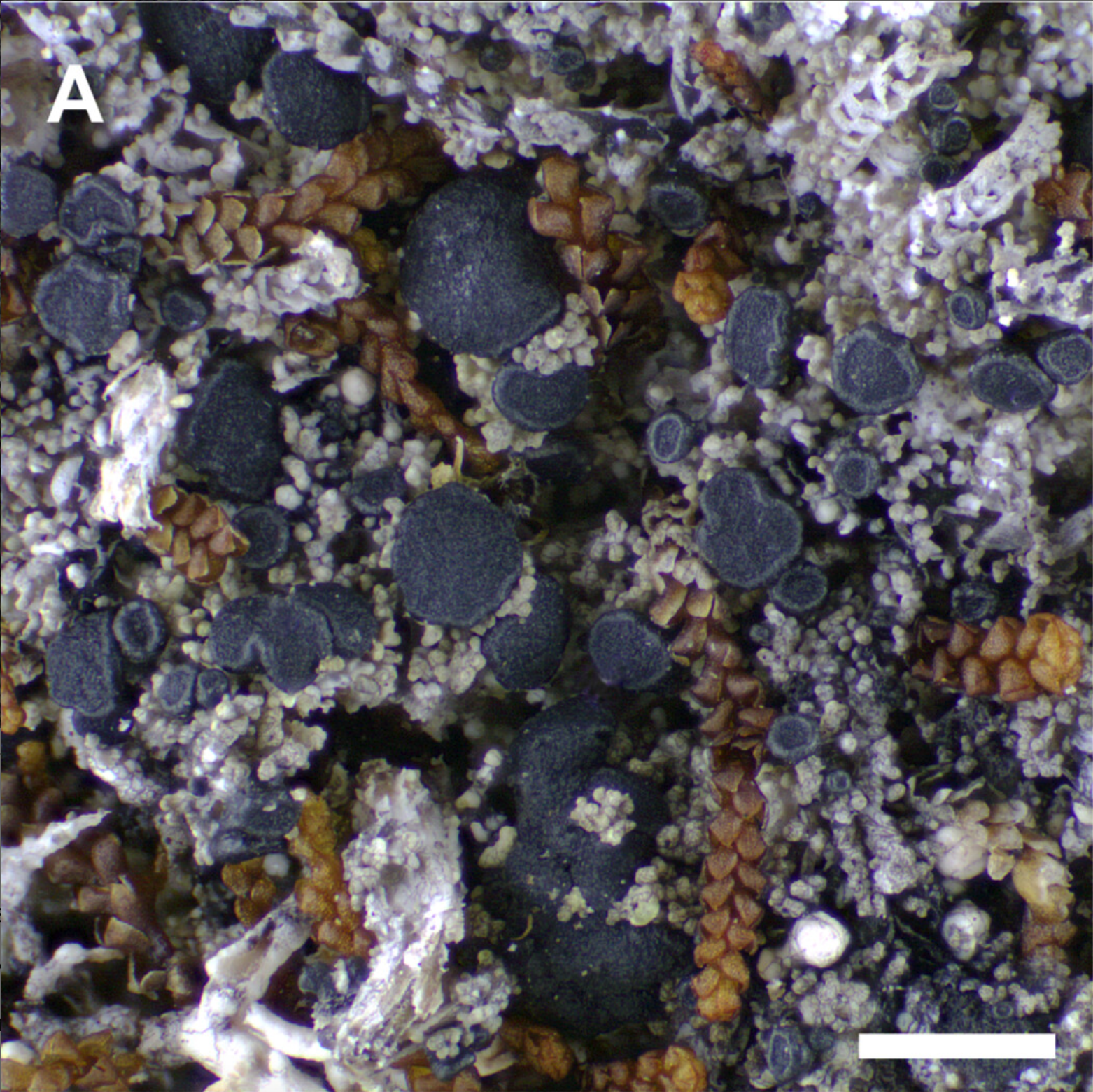
Closeup of Helocarpon crassipes showing its black, marginate apothecia; scale: 1 mm

Species of Helocarpon are crustose lichens with a thallus that ranges from thin and poorly developed to well-developed and distinctly areolate. Compared with many species traditionally placed in Micarea, members of the Helocarpon lineage tend to have a more conspicuous apothecial margin (a well-developed exciple) and, in some taxa, relatively large photobiont cells rather than the paired "micareoid" arrangement common in Micarea sensu stricto. Apothecia (fruiting bodies) are generally dark (often black), and in the type species they are characteristically shortly stalked and clearly marginate. Internal pigmentation is often strong in the apothecial tissues (for example, dark hypothecial colours have been used in traditional species concepts within the group).

Some species associate secondarily with cyanobacteria in addition to their green-algal photobiont. In the arctic-alpine H. assimilatum, cyanobacteria occur in Nostoc-containing cephalodia, whereas the closely related saxicolous H. paratropum lacks Nostoc cephalodia and instead commonly shows Stigonema clusters between the areoles. Chemically, species in the lineage were characterized in the 2026 revision as lacking detectable lichen substances in the standard sense used for many Micarea groups.

== Habitat and distribution ==
Helocarpon is most often encountered in cool-climate habitats, especially in arctic, subarctic, and alpine or subalpine environments. Species occur on mineral soil or plant debris on the ground (terricolous) as well as directly on rock (saxicolous). In the 2026 synthesis, H. crassipes and H. assimilatum were discussed as terricolous species associated with arctic-alpine settings, while H. erraticum was described as mostly saxicolous and widely distributed.

The most range-restricted species discussed in detail was H. paratropum, which was treated as an arctic-alpine lichen known from Scotland and Scandinavia and also reported from Canada. It resembles H. assimilatum morphologically but differs in substrate preference and in its cyanobacterial associations.

== Species ==
The 2026 multilocus revision recognised four species in Helocarpon:

- Helocarpon assimilatum (Nyl.) M.Svenss., Myllys & Kantel. (2026)
- Helocarpon crassipes Th.Fr. (1860)
- Helocarpon erraticum (Körb.) M.Svenss., Myllys & Kantel. (2026)
- Helocarpon paratropum (Nyl.) M.Svenss., Myllys & Kantel. (2026)
