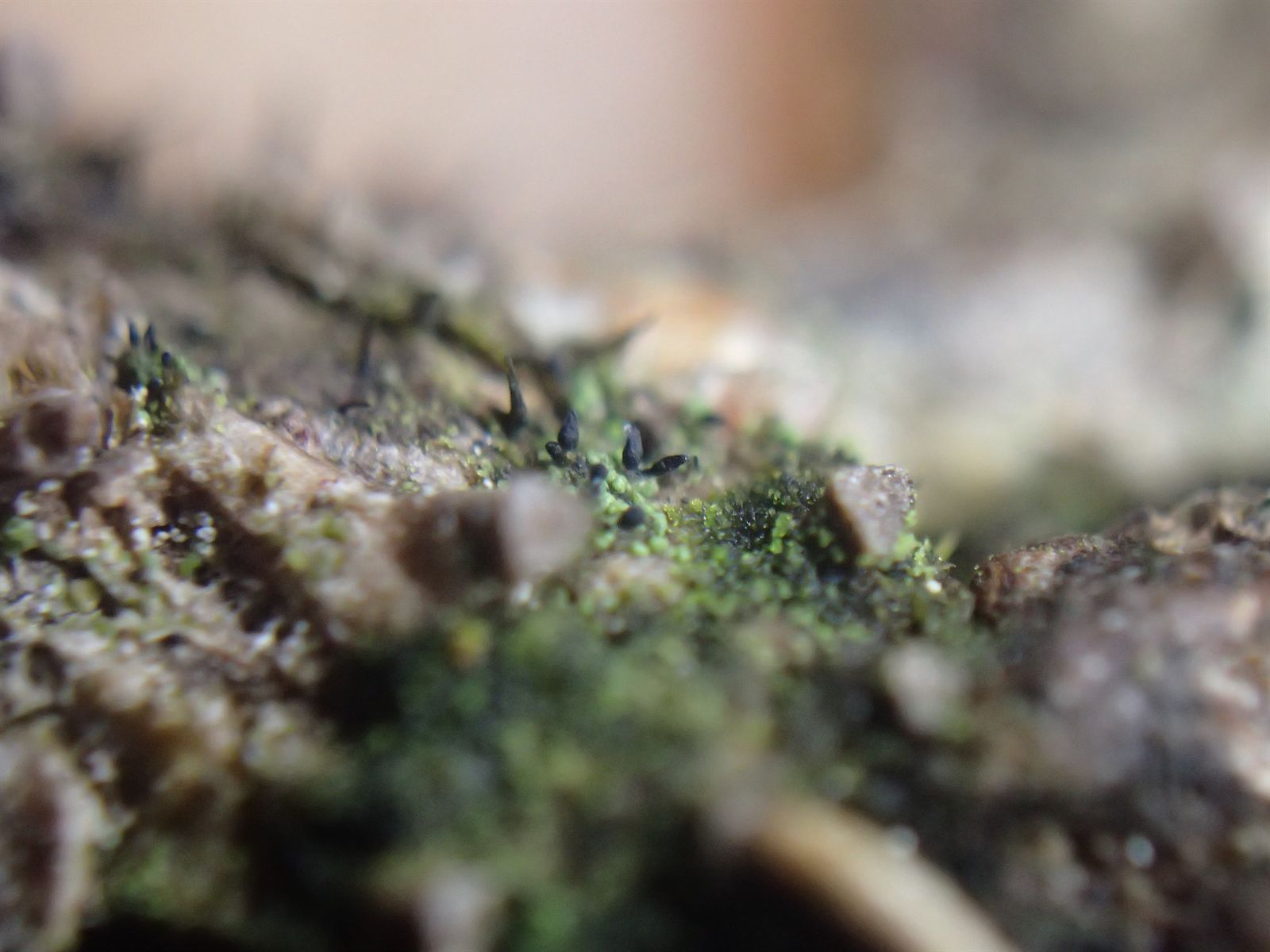

Scientific classification
- Kingdom: Fungi
- Division: Ascomycota
- Class: Lecanoromycetes
- Order: Lecanorales
- Family: Ectolechiaceae
- Genus: Micarea
- Species: M. leucopoda

Binomial name
- Micarea leucopoda (Holien & Tønsberg) Myllys & Kantvilas (2026)

Synonyms
- Szczawinskia leucopoda Holien & Tønsberg (2002)

= Micarea leucopoda =

Species of lichen-forming fungus

Micarea leucopoda is a rare species of lichen in the family Ectolechiaceae. It is characterised by its distinctive granular body that appears dark greenish to greyish green and its unique stalked reproductive structures with black, spoon-shaped heads on whitish stalks. First described in 2002, this lichen grows primarily on the twigs of spruce and fir trees in humid coniferous forests across an amphi-Atlantic distribution, being found in coastal regions of central Norway and Newfoundland, Canada. The species typically occurs in older, undisturbed forests with high humidity, where it forms part of species-rich communities of lichens. Though previously found in Sweden, M. leucopoda is now regionally extinct there, with its disappearance linked to forestry operations that destroyed its habitat and altered the local environmental conditions, demonstrating its sensitivity to forest management practices.

== Taxonomy ==
Micarea leucopoda was formally described as a new species in 2002 by the Norwegian lichenologists Håkon Holien and Tor Tønsberg, as Szczawinskia leucopoda. Prior to its formal description, specimens of this lichen had been misidentified as Szczawinskia tsugae in earlier publications. The holotype specimen (the reference specimen used to formally describe the species) was collected on 13 March 1997, from twigs of Picea abies in an old spruce forest located in a small brook ravine on marine sediments west of Foss, Overhalla, Nord-Trøndelag, Norway, at an elevation of 80 m. This type specimen is housed in the herbarium of the University of Bergen. The species was reclassified in the genus Micarea in 2026.

== Description ==
Micarea leucopoda has a distinctive granular thallus (the main body of the lichen) that appears dark greenish to greyish green. The granules measure about 0.08–0.24 mm in diameter and often form clusters, with thallus patches reaching 0.28–2.0 mm across. The thallus lacks both soredia and isidia (propagules for asexual reproduction).

A distinctive feature of M. leucopoda is its stalked pycnidia (asexual reproductive structures) which reach 0.11–0.36 mm in height. These structures consist of a black, spathulate (spoon-shaped) head on a short whitish to greyish stalk. The pycnidial head is typically two to four times longer than the stalk and often produces a whitish slime containing filiform (thread-like) conidia (asexual spores) at its tip. These conidia are usually strongly curved, sigmoid (S-shaped) or flexuose (wavy), indistinctly septate (divided by cross-walls), and measure 35–95 μm in length by 1.0 μm in width.

Micarea leucopoda occasionally produces sexual reproductive structures (apothecia). These are lecideine in form (disk-shaped with a distinct rim), measuring 0.12–0.44 mm in diameter. The disk appears pale greyish to bluish grey, initially flat but becoming convex with age, and slightly pruinose (covered with a frost-like coating). The margin is pale greyish and distinct in young apothecia but becomes less prominent with age. The ascospores (sexual spores) are filiform, colourless, spirally twisted in the asci (spore-producing cells), 4–9 septate, and measure 38–80 μm in length by 1.5 μm in width.

Chemically, M. leucopoda contains norstictic acid, which can be detected by a yellowish reaction turning rusty red when potassium hydroxide solution (K) is applied to crystals in the epihymenium (upper layer of the fruiting body), hymenium (spore-producing layer), and excipulum (outer layer of the fruiting body).

== Habitat and distribution ==
Micarea leucopoda has an amphi-Atlantic distribution pattern, being found in coastal regions of Central Norway and in Newfoundland, Canada. This distribution reflects what lichenologists refer to as the "Trøndelag phytogeographical element", a biogeographical pattern shared by only a few lichen species. M. leucopoda grows in humid coniferous forest environments where it forms part of species-rich lichen communities belonging to the Lobarion association. These communities are typically found in older, relatively undisturbed forest stands with high humidity and good air quality.

In Norway, M. leucopoda is predominantly found on thin twigs of Norway spruce (Picea abies), with only one recorded instance on rowan (Sorbus aucuparia). In Canada, specimens have been collected from balsam fir (Abies balsamifera) trunks and black spruce (Picea mariana) twigs. The lichen occurs at relatively low elevations, with documented sites ranging from near sea level up to approximately 190 metres in elevation.

Micarea leucopoda is often associated with other rare or ecologically significant lichens including Biatora rufidula, Fuscopannaria ahlneri, Gyalideopsis piceicola, Lichinodium ahlneri, and Pseudocyphellaria crocata. The critically endangered species Erioderma pedicellatum, another lichen with an amphi-Atlantic distribution pattern, has been found growing in the same locality as M. leucopoda. The species' habitat requirements and restricted distribution pattern suggest it may be sensitive to forest management practices and could serve as an indicator of high-value conservation forests with long ecological continuity.

Micarea leucopoda was historically present in Sweden but is now considered regionally extinct (RE) in the country. Its disappearance has been directly linked to forestry operations that removed its habitat and dramatically altered the local microclimate, particularly through increased drying. This species appears to be particularly sensitive to habitat disturbance, having disappeared from Swedish forests alongside other rare lichens including Erioderma pedicellatum and Lichinodium ahlneri, making this a well-documented case of multiple co-extinctions resulting from forest management practices.
