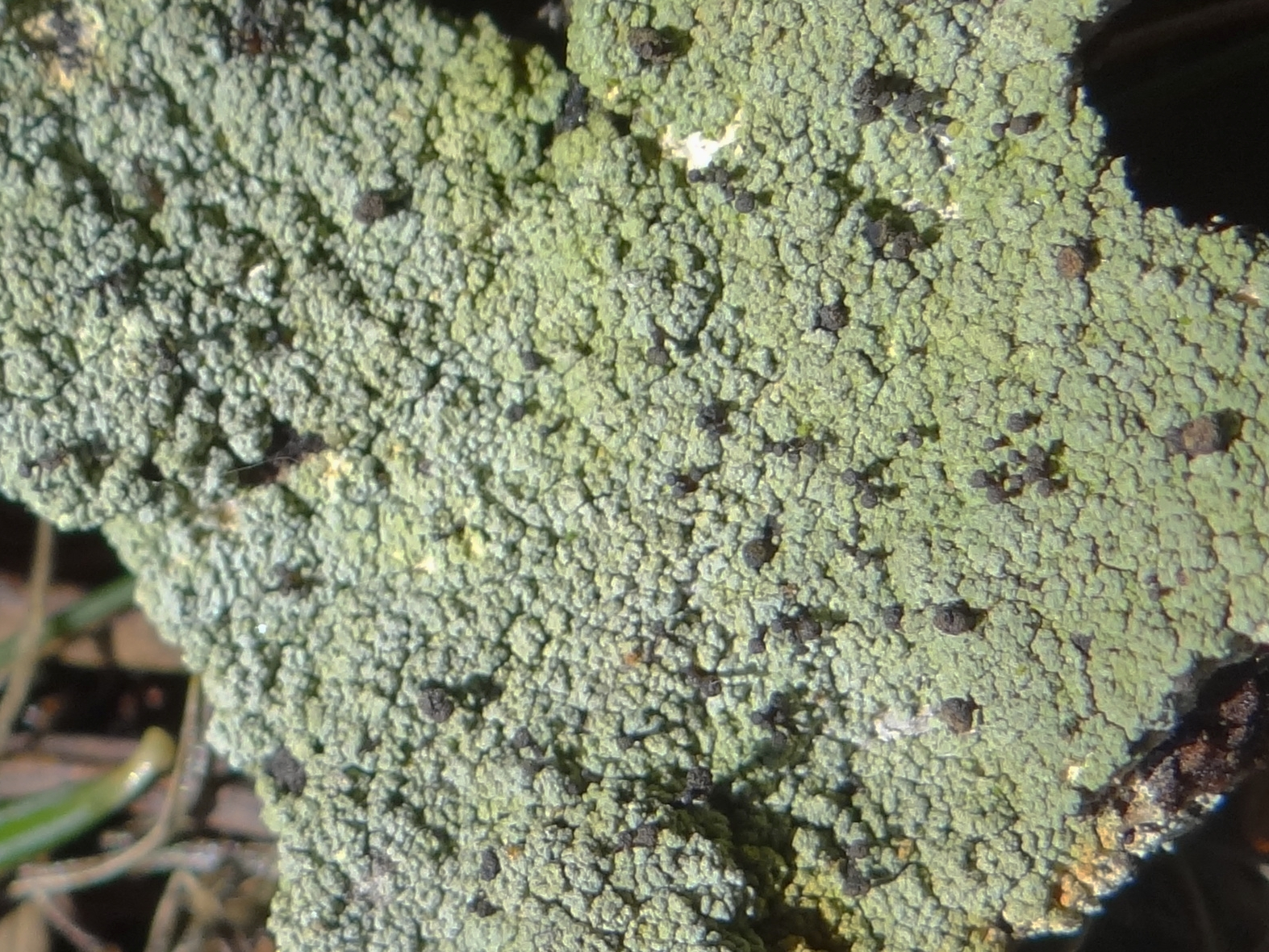
- Micarea prasina

Scientific classification
- Kingdom: Fungi
- Division: Ascomycota
- Class: Lecanoromycetes
- Order: Lecanorales
- Family: Ectolechiaceae
- Genus: Micarea; Fr. (1825)

Type species
- Micarea prasina Fr. (1825)

Synonyms
- Hastifera D.Hawksw. & Poelt (1986); Stereocauliscum Nyl. (1865); Szczawinskia A.Funk (1984); Uluguria Vězda (2004)

= Micarea =

Genus of lichen-forming fungi

Micarea is a genus of lichen-forming fungi in the family Ectolechiaceae. The widely distributed genus contains 156 species and new species are described actively. Species in the genus are crustose lichens and their photobiont (the non-fungal organism) is a single-celled green alga. The genus was established by the Swedish mycologist Elias Fries in 1825. Micarea lichens are typically small and often overlooked, producing minute fruiting bodies that are usually whitish, grey, or bluish in colour. Many species reproduce both sexually through spores and asexually through specialised structures, and they are found on substrates ranging from tree bark and dead wood to rocks and even moss. The genus has a cosmopolitan distribution, with species recorded from Europe, Australasia, the Americas, Africa, and oceanic islands. Several species are of interest to researchers studying how shifts between different substrates and reproductive strategies drive the formation of new species.

== Taxonomy ==
Micarea was circumscribed by Elias Magnus Fries in his 1825 work Systema Orbis Vegetabilis. In his diagnosis, Fries characterised the genus by an effuse, crust-like thallus made up of aggregated gelatinous granules, together with free, almost spherical apothecia that are "always open" and lack a distinct margin. He recorded it from rocks and especially damp wood, and remarked that sterile material of Micarea prasina (the type species) could be difficult to tell apart from algae-like crusts recognised at the time.

There have been some taxonomic disputes about the genus. Early molecular studies suggested that Micarea as traditionally circumscribed did not always form a single evolutionary lineage, because some analyses placed other ectolechiaceous genera within Micarea when only one or a few gene regions were sampled. A large, five–locus phylogeny published in 2026 (based on worldwide sampling of 314 specimens representing 102 species) recovered Micarea in a broad sense as a single, moderately to strongly supported clade when some lineages historically treated as separate genera were included. In that analysis, Micarea formed the sister lineage to a predominantly tropical, foliicolous (leaf-dwelling) clade ("Ectolechiaceae sensu stricto") that includes genera such as Byssoloma, Calopadia, Fellhanera, Lasioloma and Sporopodium, although support for this relationship varied among analyses.

On a classificatory level, that study favoured a middle-ground ("mesogeneric") solution rather than splitting the phylogeny into many small genera. It treated the earliest-diverging lineage (centred on Micarea crassipes and allies) as the separate genus Helocarpon, and retained the remaining clades in Micarea. It also reduced Szczawinskia to synonymy with Micarea (with new combinations for its species) and treated Uluguria as a synonym as well. The authors also discussed two small, potentially related genera. In their expanded sampling, Fellhaneropsis (including the type, F. myrtillicola) fell within the broader Micarea clade, but its placement and status were treated as unresolved because of missing data and limited sampling. Separate gene-tree analyses also suggested that Micareopsis irriguata may belong within the Micarea melanoprasina lineage, although this placement was treated as provisional pending additional data.

The 2026 phylogeny also recovered multiple strongly supported infrageneric clades that often correlate with combinations of thallus structure, ascospore and conidial morphology, and pigment or secondary-chemistry profiles. The core M. prasina group (the clade containing the type species) is largely characterised by goniocyst-based thalli and by the restricted occurrence of micareic acid, methoxymicareic acid, and prasinic acid, whereas many of the more basal lineages lack detectable lichen substances and include a wider mix of thallus forms and photobiont types.

=== Classification ===
The familial placement of Micarea has changed as classification systems have been revised. In morphology-based schemes the genus was long treated as the type of the family Micareaceae. Molecular phylogenetic work then showed that the "core" Micarea lineage is closely allied to, and in single-locus analyses can intergrade with, a predominantly tropical group of foliicolous lichens that had often been treated as the separate family Pilocarpaceae; this led to proposals to merge Micareaceae into that broader family concept.

Under current nomenclature, Pilocarpaceae is treated as an illegitimate name and Ectolechiaceae as the correct family name for this group, while Byssolomataceae (used in some databases) is treated as a later synonym. The 2026 multilocus revision adopted Ectolechiaceae for Micarea and recovered the genus as the sister lineage to a mainly foliicolous clade ("Ectolechiaceae sensu stricto") containing genera such as Byssoloma and Calopadia.

== Description ==
Species of Micarea are small crustose lichens whose thallus forms a thin, spreading crust that may sit on the surface or be partly immersed in the substrate. The thallus is commonly built from tiny, almost spherical granules called goniocysts (minute clusters of fungal hyphae wrapped around algal cells). These granules may remain distinct, merge into convex areoles, or form a cracked (rimose) or scurfy crust; in some species the areoles break down into soredia for asexual dispersal, while isidia are only rarely present. A distinct marginal prothallus is usually absent or inconspicuous, and the thallus typically lacks a true outer cortex, though some species develop a thin, colourless outer layer.

The photobiont is usually a coccoid, single-celled green alga with thin-walled cells about 4–8 micrometres (μm)) across. In Micarea sensu stricto these "micareoid" photobionts have been identified mainly as members of Coccomyxa and Elliptochloris, with other algal partners recorded occasionally. Cephalodia (cyanobacteria-containing structures) have been documented in a small subset of species; published examples include M. flagellispora, M. incrassata, M. inopinula, M. saxicola, M. subconfusa and M. tubaeformis, with the cyanobacteria reported as Nostoc or Stigonema depending on the species.

Sexual fruiting bodies (apothecia) are usually present but are often minute (mostly under 1 mm across). They are commonly whitish to grey or bluish, but may be brown to black, and they are not pruinose. The apothecia are typically immarginate and sit close to the thallus. Stalked forms occur only rarely, and a thallus-derived margin is absent in almost all cases. Internally, the apothecial margin (exciple) ranges from poorly developed to well developed and is formed from radiating, branched hyphae. The pigments in these tissues can give characteristic reactions in standard chemical tests, and the spore-bearing layer (hymenium) is gelatinised and may turn blue in iodine. The hymenium contains mostly branched paraphyses, though some species also have sturdier, unbranched paraphyses; the tips are not, or only slightly, swollen and lack a dark apical cap. The asci bear eight spores and are club-shaped, with apical structures that show characteristic staining patterns. Ascospores are colourless and smooth, lack a perispore, and may be simple or transversely septate. Their shapes range from ellipsoid and ovoid to spindle-shaped or needle-like. Asexual reproductive structures are usually pycnidia (rarely sporodochia), which may be immersed, sessile, or raised on short stalks. Three conidium types are produced: macroconidia (often curved, thread-like, or coiled, and often septate), mesoconidia (shorter, usually aseptate, often with oil droplets, and mostly about 1–2 μm wide), and microconidia (very small, simple, and to about 1 μm wide). Chemically, many species have no detectable secondary metabolites by thin-layer chromatography, while others produce a range of substances. Gyrophoric acid occurs in several species.

== Reproduction ==
Lichen-forming fungi have developed diverse reproduction strategies. Genus Micarea is used as a model for studying how reproductive traits and environmental factors relate to speciation, because species differ in both substrate use and reproductive mode. Some Micarea species are generalists that can grow on several substrates, while others are restricted to narrow microhabitats. In the Micarea prasina group, some species are predominantly sexual, while others often lack sexual structures but bear numerous pycnidia that produce asexual conidia. The roles of the different conidium types are still not fully understood, but mesoconidia are thought to act as asexual propagules, based in part on specimens that regularly have only mesopycnidia and no apothecia. Recent phylogenetic analyses together with ancestral state reconstruction indicate that shifts in reproduction mode have evolved independently several times in the group, and that facultative and obligate lignicoles can be sister species. This pattern is consistent with a facultative lignicole ancestor, and suggests that shifts from bark to dead wood can coincide with a move towards asexual reproduction. One proposed explanation is that dead wood is a short-lived habitat, so species confined to it may need to colonise new suitable substrata quickly; faster dispersal via asexual propagules could then promote reproductive divergence and contribute to speciation.

== Species ==
As of February 2026, Species Fungorum (in the Catalogue of Life) accepts 156 species of Micarea. A major multilocus revision published in 2026 described four additional species (M. arthonioides, M. athromelaena, M. lignosorediata and M. regalis) and treated M. assimilata, M. crassipes, Micarea erratica and Micarea paratropa as belonging to Helocarpon rather than Micarea.

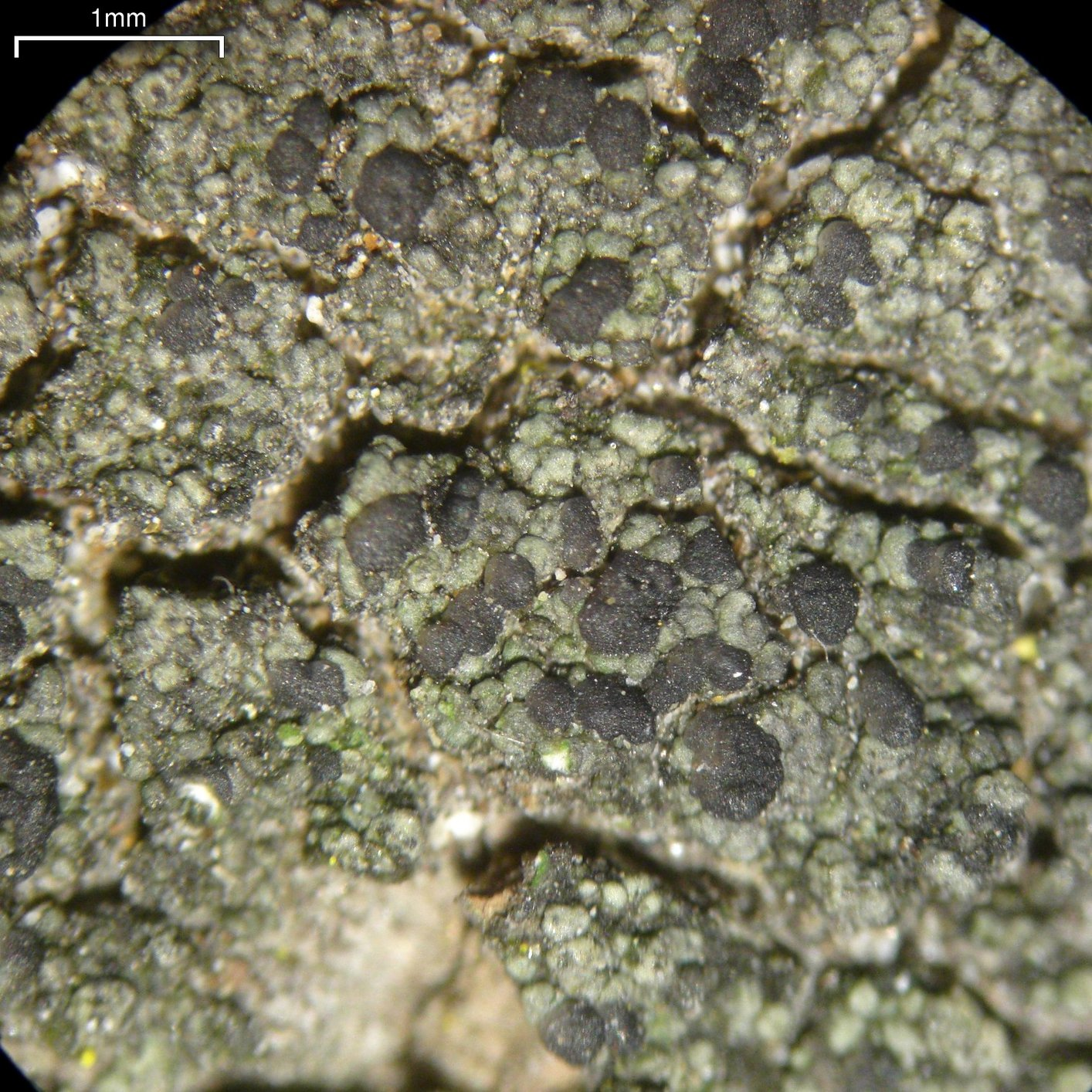
Micarea denigrata

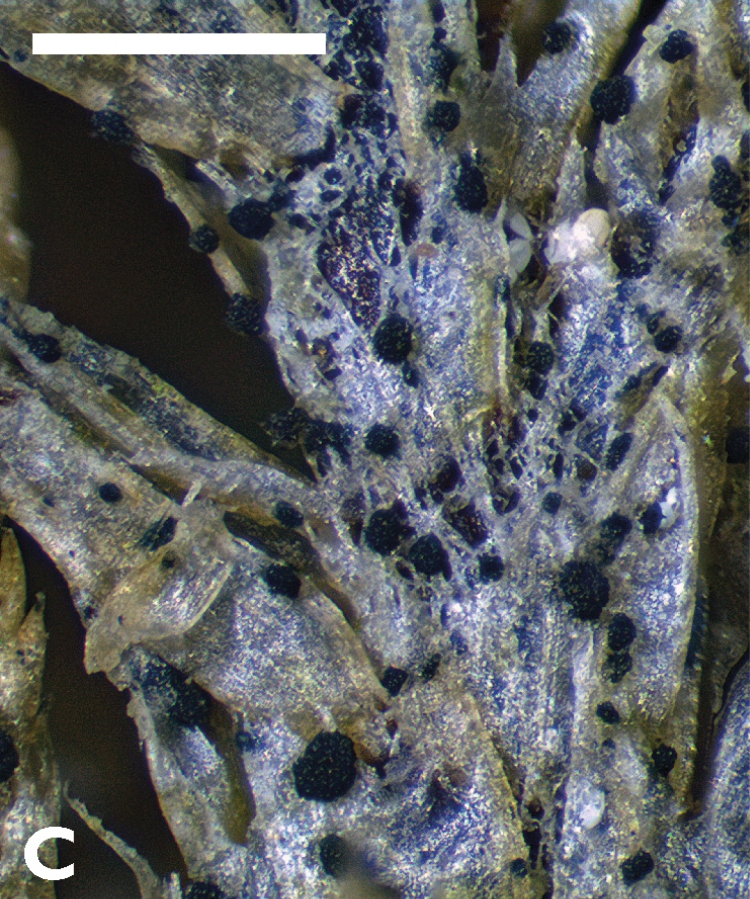
Micarea hylocomii; scale bar is 0.5 mm

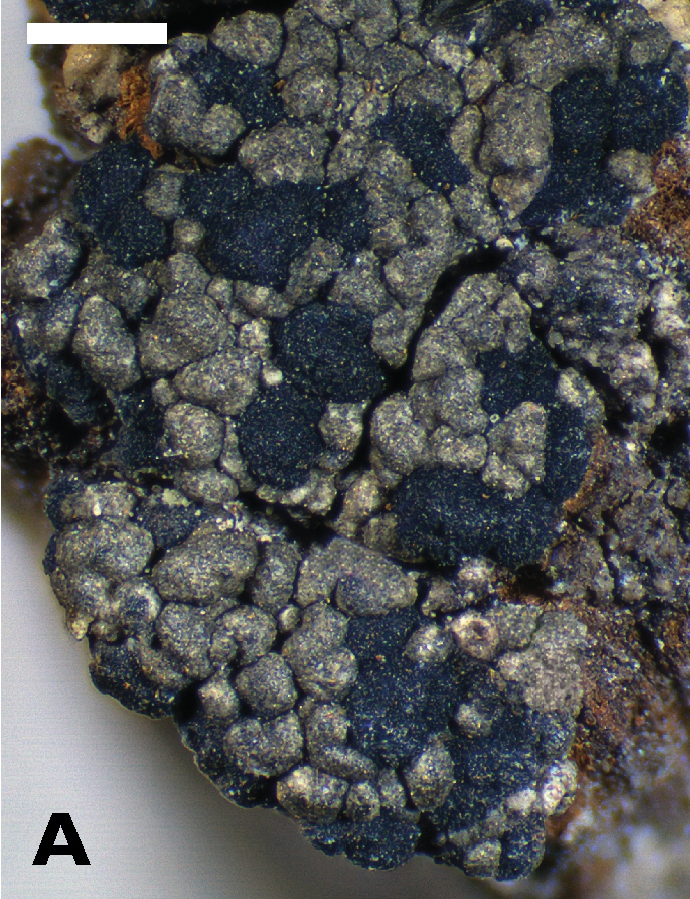
Micarea subconfusa; scale bar is 0.5 mm

- Micarea adnata Coppins (1983)
- Micarea aeruginoprasina van den Boom, Guzow-Krzemińska, A.M.Brand & Sérusiaux (2019)
- Micarea alabastrites (Nyl.) Coppins (1982)
- Micarea alectorialica M.Brand, van den Boom & Sérus. (2014)
- Micarea amplissima van den Boom & Etayo (2023)
- Micarea argopsinosa P.M.McCarthy & Elix (2016)
- Micarea arthonioides van den Boom, Aptroot, Kantel. & Myllys (2026)
- Micarea athromelaena Kantvilas, Myllys & Kantel. (2026)
- Micarea austroternaria Coppins & Kantvilas (1990) – Australia
- Micarea azorica van den Boom, Guzow-Krzemińska, A.M.Brand & Sérusiaux (2019)
- Micarea bacidiella (Vain.) Vězda (1976)
- Micarea bebourensis M.Brand, van den Boom & Sérus. (2014)
- Micarea borbonica M.Brand, van den Boom & Sérus. (2014)
- Micarea boryana M.Brand, van den Boom & Sérus. (2014)
- Micarea botryoides (Nyl.) Coppins (1980)
- Micarea byssacea (Th.Fr.) Czarnota, Guzow-Krzem. & Coppins (2010)
- Micarea canariensis van den Boom (2013)
- Micarea capitata M.Svenss. & G.Thor (2011)
- Micarea ceracea Coppins & Kantvilas (2019) – Australasia
- Micarea ceylanica Coppins (2021) – Sri Lanka
- Micarea cilaosensis M.Brand, van den Boom & Sérus. (2014)
- Micarea cinerea (Schaer.) Hedl. (1892)
- Micarea cinereopallida Coppins & Kantvilas (2019) – Australasia; South America
- Micarea contexta Hedl. (1892)
- Micarea coppinsii Tønsberg (1992)
- Micarea corallothallina M.Cáceres, D.A.Mota & Aptroot (2013)
- Micarea crassa P.M.McCarthy & Elix (2020)
- Micarea curvata Coppins (1983)
- Micarea czarnotae Launis, van den Boom, Sérus. & Myllys (2019)
- Micarea deminuta Coppins (1995)
- Micarea denigrata (Fr.) Hedl. (1892)
- Micarea doliiformis (Coppins & P.James) Coppins & Sérus. (2010)
- Micarea elachista (Körb.) Coppins & R.Sant. (1983)
- Micarea epiphylla van den Boom (2021)
- Micarea eucalypti P.M.McCarthy & Elix (2016)
- Micarea eximia Hedl. (1892)
- Micarea fallax Launis & Myllys (2019)
- Micarea farinosa Coppins & Aptroot (2008)
- Micarea fennica Launis & Myllys (2019)
- Micarea flagellispora Coppins & Kantvilas (1990) – Australasia
- Micarea flavoleprosa Launis, Malíček & Sérus. (2019)
- Micarea foliicola (Holien & Tønsberg) Myllys & Kantvilas (2026)
- Micarea globulosella (Nyl.) Coppins (1983)
- Micarea granuloblastidiata van den Boom (2017) – Panama
- Micarea hedlundii Coppins (1983)
- Micarea herbarum M.Brand, Coppins, Sérus. & van den Boom (2017) – Europe
- Micarea humilis P.M.McCarthy & Elix (2018) – Australia
- Micarea hyalinoxanthonica M.Brand, van den Boom & Sérus. (2014)
- Micarea hylocomii Poelt & Döbbeler (1975)
- Micarea hypoviolascens Czarnota & Coppins (2005)
- Micarea incrassata Hedl. (1892)
- Micarea inopinula (Nyl.) Coppins & T.Sprib. (2021)
- Micarea inquinans Tul.) Coppins (1992)
- Micarea intersociella (Stirt.) Coppins (1994)
- Micarea isabellina Coppins & Kantvilas (1990) – Australia
- Micarea isidioprasina van den Boom, Guzow-Krzemińska, Sérusiaux, M.Kukwa (2019)
- Micarea isidiosa M.Brand, van den Boom & Sérus. (2014)
- Micarea kartana Kantvilas & Coppins (2018) – Australia
- Micarea kemmleri Brackel (2016)
- Micarea laeta Launis & Myllys (2019)
- Micarea lapillicola (Vain.) Coppins & Muhr (1997)
- Micarea leprosula (Th.Fr.) Coppins & A.Fletcher (1975)
- Micarea leucopoda (Holien & Tønsberg) Myllys & Kantvilas (2026)
- Micarea levicula (Nyl.) Coppins (2001)
- Micarea lignaria (Ach.) Hedl. (1892)
- Micarea lignosorediata van den Boom, Aptroot, Kantel. & Myllys (2026)
- Micarea lithinella (Nyl.) Hedl. (1892)
- Micarea longispora Coppins (2021)
- Micarea magellanica (Müll.Arg.) Fryday (2004)
- Micarea marginata Coppins & Muhr (1988)
- Micarea melaena (Nyl.) Hedl. (1892)
- Micarea melaenida (Nyl.) Coppins (1983)
- Micarea melaeniza
- Micarea melanobola (Nyl.) Coppins (1983)
- Micarea melanoprasina M.Brand, van den Boom & Sérus. (2014)
- Micarea meridionalis van den Boom, M.Brand, Coppins & Sérus. (2017) – Europe
- Micarea microareolata Launis, Pykälä & Myllys (2019)
- Micarea micrococca (Körb.) Gams ex Coppins (2002)
- Micarea micromelaena Kantvilas & Coppins (2019) – Australasia
- Micarea microsorediata van den Boom, Guzow-Krzemińska, Sérusiaux, M.Kukwa (2019)
- Micarea minuta van den Boom, Guzow-Krzem. & Kukwa (2020) – western Europe
- Micarea misella (Nyl.) Hedl. (1892)
- Micarea mutabilis Coppins & Kantvilas (1990) – Australia
- Micarea myriocarpa V.Wirth & Vězda ex Coppins (1983)
- Micarea neostipitata Coppins & P.F.May (2001) – eastern North America
- Micarea nigella Coppins (1983)
- Micarea nigrata (Müll.Arg.) Kalb (1981)
- Micarea nitschkeana (J.Lahm ex Rabenh.) Harm. (1899)
- Micarea novae-zelandiae Zhurb. (2023) – Australasia
- Micarea nowakii Czarnota & Coppins (2007)
- Micarea olivacea Coppins (1983)
- Micarea oreina Kantvilas & Coppins (2019) – Australasia
- Micarea pallida Coppins & Kantvilas (2019) – Australasia
- Micarea pannarica Fryday (2004)
- Micarea parasitica van den Boom & Etayo (2023)
- Micarea parva Coppins (1995)
- Micarea pauli Guzow-Krzemińska, A.Łubek & M.Kukwa (2019)
- Micarea peliocarpa (Anzi) Coppins & R.Sant. (1979)
- Micarea phylicae (Øvstedal) Myllys & Kantvilas (2026)
- Micarea poliocheila (Vain.) Aptroot (2002)
- Micarea polycarpella (Erichsen) Coppins & Palice (1995)
- Micarea prasina Fr. (1825)
- Micarea prasinastra Coppins & Kantvilas (2019) – Australasia
- Micarea prasinella (Jatta) I.M.Lamb (1954)
- Micarea pseudocoppinsii M.Brand, van den Boom & Sérus. (2014)
- Micarea pseudolignaria M.Brand, van den Boom & Sérus. (2014)
- Micarea pseudomarginata Coppins (1989)
- Micarea pseudomicrococca Launis & Myllys (2019)
- Micarea pseudotsugae van den Boom, Guzow-Krzem. & Kukwa (2020) – western Europe
- Micarea pumila Kantelinen & Myllys (2021) – Kenya
- Micarea pusilla Launis, Malíček & Myllys (2019)
- Micarea pycnidiophora Coppins & P.James (1979)
- Micarea queenslandica P.M.McCarthy & Elix (2020)
- Micarea regalis Kantvilas & Myllys (2026)
- Micarea rubiformis P.M.McCarthy & Elix (2020)
- Micarea rubiginosa Coppins & Kantvilas (2019) – Australasia; South America
- Micarea rubioides Coppins (2021)
- Micarea sambuci van den Boom, M.Brand, Coppins & Sérus. (2019)
- Micarea sandyana Kantvilas (2019) – Australasia
- Micarea saxicola Coppins & Kantvilas (2019) – Australasia
- Micarea senecionis van den Boom (2010)
- Micarea sipmanii Sérus. & Coppins (2009)
- Micarea soralifera Guzow-Krzem., Czarnota, Łubek & Kukwa (2016)
- Micarea squamulosa Aptroot, Lücking & M.Cáceres (2019)
- Micarea stellaris Kantelinen & Myllys (2021) – Kenya
- Micarea stereocaulorum van den Boom & Etayo (2017)
- Micarea stipitata Coppins & P.James (1979)
- Micarea subalpina Coppins & T.Sprib. (2004)
- Micarea subcinerea M.Brand & van den Boom (2004)
- Micarea subconfusa (Nyl.) Alstrup (1994)
- Micarea subgranulans (Vain.) Aptroot (2002) – Brazil
- Micarea sublithinella M.Brand, van den Boom & Sérus. (2014)
- Micarea submilliaria (Nyl.) Coppins (1994)
- Micarea subnigrata (Nyl.) Coppins & H.Kilias (1981)
- Micarea subternaria (Vain.) Aptroot (2002)
- Micarea subviridescens (Nyl.) Hedl. (1892)
- Micarea svetlanae L.Konoreva & S.Chesnokov (2025)
- Micarea synotheoides (Nyl.) Coppins (1982)
- Micarea taitensis Kantelinen & Myllys (2021) – Kenya
- Micarea takamakae M.Brand, van den Boom & Sérus. (2014)
- Micarea tenuispora M.Brand, van den Boom & Sérus. (2014)
- Micarea termitophila Aptroot & M.Cáceres (2014) – Brazil
- Micarea ternaria (Nyl.) Vězda (1970)
- Micarea tsugae (A.Funk) Myllys & Kantvilas (2026)
- Micarea tomentosa Czarnota & Coppins (2007)
- Micarea tubaeformis Coppins & Kantvilas (2019) – Australasia
- Micarea turfosa (A.Massal.) Du Rietz (1923)
- Micarea usneae van den Boom & Ertz (2014) – Madeira
- Micarea versicolor Kantelinen, Hyvärinen & Myllys (2021) – Kenya
- Micarea viridiatra Coppins (1985) – Europe
- Micarea viridicapitata Córd.-Cháv., Aptroot & R.-E.Pérez (2014) – Mexico
- Micarea viridileprosa Coppins & van den Boom (2001) – western Europe
- Micarea vulpinaris (Nyl.) Muhr (1987)
- Micarea xanthonica Coppins & Tønsberg (2001) – Europe; North America
