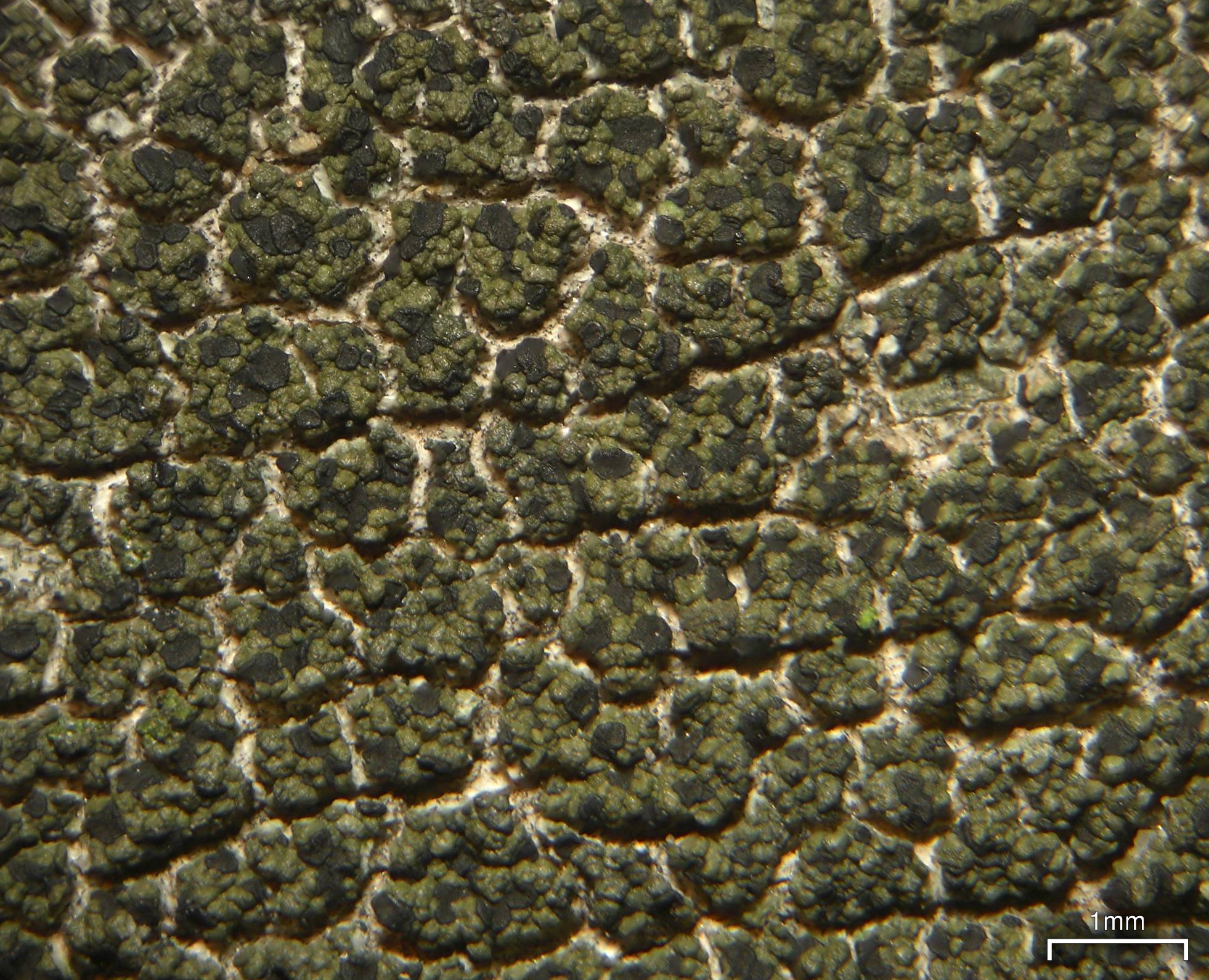

Scientific classification
- Kingdom: Fungi
- Division: Ascomycota
- Class: Lecanoromycetes
- Order: Lecanorales
- Family: Ectolechiaceae
- Genus: Helocarpon
- Species: H. erraticum

Binomial name
- Helocarpon erraticum (Körb.) M.Svenss., Myllys & Kantel. (2026)

Synonyms
- List: Lecidea erratica Körb. (1861); Biatora moestula (Nyl.) Arnold (1871); Biatorina expansa Arnold (1861); Lecidea demarginata Nyl. (1878); Lecidea dispansa Nyl. (1866); Lecidea erratica f. demarginata (Nyl.) Vain. (1934); Lecidea erratica f. dendroides Erichsen (1938); Lecidea erratica var. demarginata (Nyl.) Lettau (1912); Lecidea expansa Nyl. (1861); Lecidea expansa f. demarginata (Nyl.) Arnold (1884); Lecidea expansa subsp. demarginata (Nyl.) A.L.Sm. (1911); Lecidea expansa var. demarginata (Nyl.) A.L.Sm. (1926); Lecidea moestula Nyl. (1868); Lecidea sarcogynoides * dispansa (Nyl.) Branth & Rostr. (1869); Lecidea tephrizans Leight. (1878); Micarea erratica (Körb.) Hertel, Rambold & Pietschm. (1989); Leimonis erratica (Körb.) R.C.Harris & Lendemer (2009)

= Helocarpon erraticum =

Species of lichen-forming fungus

Helocarpon erraticum is a species of crustose lichen in the family Ectolechiaceae. It grows mainly on siliceous rock and is a widely distributed species.

== Taxonomy ==
The lichen was originally described in 1861 by German lichenologist Gustav Wilhelm Körber as Lecidea erratica. It was later treated in a broad sense within Micarea, and in 2009 Richard C. Harris and James Lendemer erected the genus Leimonis for it, emphasizing its saxicolous habit and its comparatively well-developed thallus and exciple.

A five-locus phylogeny published in 2026 recovered Helocarpon as a strongly supported clade sister to Micarea and showed that Leimonis (based on erratica) falls within Helocarpon as circumscribed there. That revision reduced Leimonis to synonymy and made the new combination Helocarpon erraticum.

== Description ==
In the 2026 revision, H. erraticum was described as forming a rather thick, olive-green to grey-green crust that cracks into small angular patches (rimose–areolate). Its fruiting bodies (apothecia) are numerous, very small (to about 0.4 mm across), and dark brown to blackish. The spores are narrow and colourless, and are usually simple but may have a single septum (1-septate).

== Habitat and distribution ==
Helocarpon erraticum is mostly saxicolous and occurs chiefly on siliceous rocks, where it can behave as an early coloniser of exposed mineral surfaces. The 2026 revision characterised it as widely distributed.
