= Micarea pseudolignaria =

Scientific classification
- Kingdom: Fungi
- Division: Ascomycota
- Class: Lecanoromycetes
- Order: Lecanorales
- Family: Ectolechiaceae
- Genus: Micarea
- Species: M. pseudolignaria

Binomial name
- Micarea pseudolignaria M.Brand, van den Boom & Sérus. (2014)
- Type locality: Forêt de Bébour, Réunion

Species of lichen-forming fungus

Micarea pseudolignaria is a species of lichen-forming fungus in the family Ectolechiaceae. It was described as new to science in 2014 from the tropical island of Réunion (Mascarene archipelago) in the Indian Ocean. The type collection was made in the Forêt de Bébour, on the path from Bélouve to Cabane Dufour, where it grew on soil in wet montane ericoid ericoid (heather-family) thickets at about 1,740 m elevation, overgrowing decaying bryophytes.

The lichen forms a small, greyish-green body (thallus), about 2 cm across, with a cracked surface of slightly domed patches (areoles, about 0.2–0.3 mm wide). It lacks a distinct outer skin (cortex), though parts of the surface are covered by a thin, clear dead layer (an epinecral layer). Its fruiting bodies (apothecia) are shiny black, convex, up to about 0.6 mm wide, and often merge to form compound structures. The ascospores are oval (ellipsoid), usually 2-celled (1-septate), and measure about 8.0–9.2 × 3.0–3.3 μm. Chemically, it contains an unidentified substance. The authors compared it with the similar Micarea lignaria, which differs in having larger spores with more cross-walls and a different set of lichen substances. The species was later compared with M. rubioides, from which it differs in lacking soralia, having shorter microconidia, and containing an unidentified PD− substance rather than argopsin; its ascospores are also shorter (8.0–9.2 μm).
