= Île Takamaka =

Île Takamaka may refer to one of two islands in separate groups in the Chagos Archipelago in the Indian Ocean:

- the Egmont Islands
- the Salomon Islands
