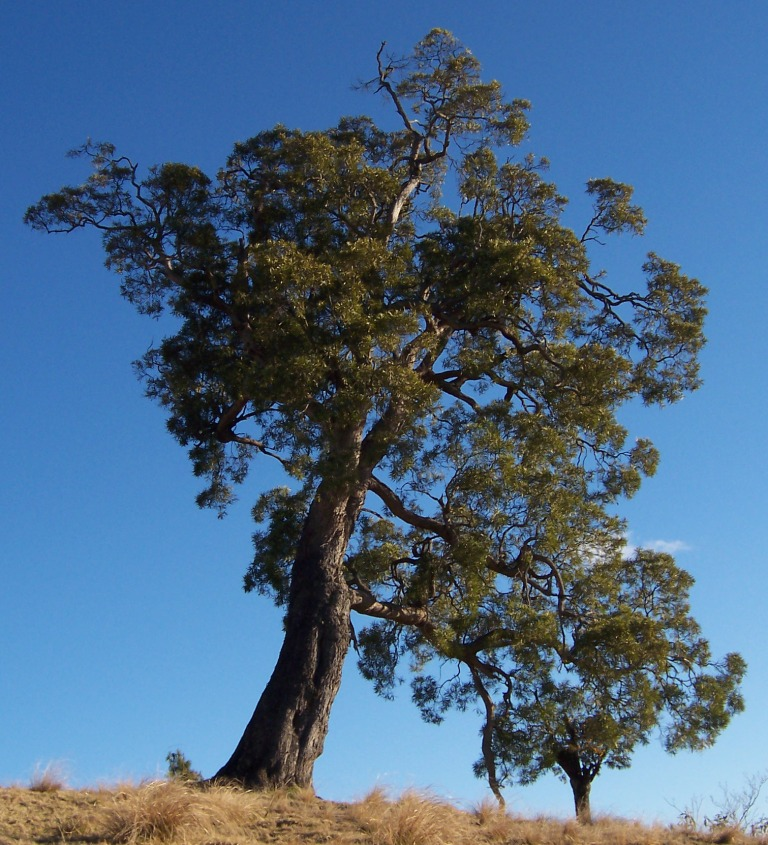

Scientific classification
- Kingdom: Plantae
- Clade: Tracheophytes
- Clade: Angiosperms
- Clade: Eudicots
- Clade: Rosids
- Order: Fabales
- Family: Fabaceae
- Subfamily: Caesalpinioideae
- Clade: Mimosoid clade
- Genus: Acacia
- Species: A. heterophylla

Binomial name
- Acacia heterophylla (Lam.) Willd.

Synonyms
- Feuilleea heterophylla (Lam.) Kuntze nom. illeg.; Mimosa heterophylla Lam.; Racosperma heterophyllum (Lam.) Pedley

= Acacia heterophylla =

Highland tamarind

Species of legume

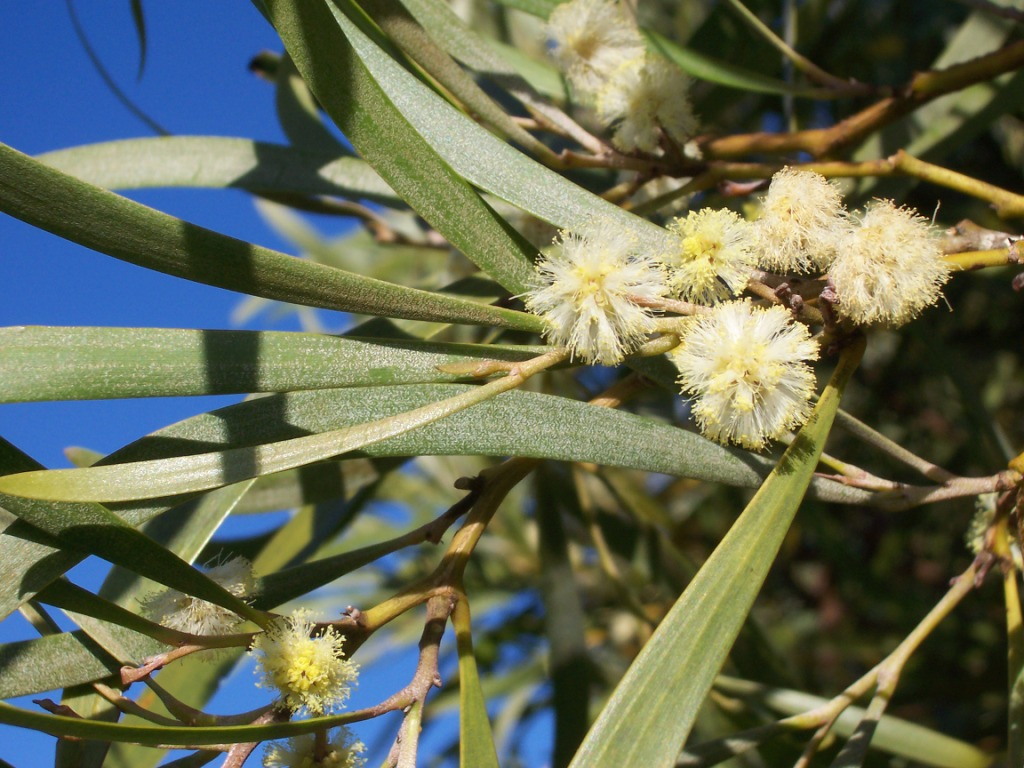
Foliage and flowers

Acacia heterophylla, commonly known as tamarin des hauts, (highland tamarind), is a species of flowering plant in the family Fabaceae and is native to Hawaii, Mauritius and Réunion. It is a shrub or tree with fissured bark, flattened phyllodes, spherical heads of pale yellow flowers and flat pods.

== Description ==
Acacia heterophylla is an evergreen tree that typically grows to a height of up to 25 m (82 ft), sometimes a shrub at altitudes above 2,000 m (6,600 ft) and has longitudinally fissured bark and an often twisted trunk. Its phyllodes are thickened, flattened, elongated and arched with entire edges and longitudinal veins. The flowers are borne in spherical heads in racemes in axils or on the ends of branches, each head with 30 to 40 pale yellow flowers. Flowering occurs from June to November, and the pods are about 100 mm (3.9 in) long with five to ten seeds.

== Taxonomy ==
This species was first formally described in 1783 by Jean-Baptiste Lamarck who gave it the name Mimosa heterophylla in Encyclopédie Méthodique. In 1806, Carl Ludwig Willdenow transferred the species to Acacia as A. heterophylla in Species Plantarum. Three subspecies have been described and the names are accepted by Plants of the World Online:

- Acacia heterophylla subsp. heterophylla is native to Mauritius and Réunion, and has been introduced to Madagascar.
- Acacia heterophylla subsp. koa (A.Gray) Morden & Faccenda is endemic to Hawaii.
- Acacia heterophylla subsp. koaia (Hillebr.) Morden & Faccenda is endemic to Hawaii.

== Dispersal history ==
Genetic sequence analysis has shown its closest relative is Acacia koa of Hawaii; the estimated time of divergence is about 1.4 million years ago. A. heterophylla sequences nest within those of the more diverse A. koa, making the latter species paraphyletic. Both species are descended from an ancestral species in Australia, presumably their sister species, Acacia melanoxylon; the means of dispersal to Hawaii and then to Réunion (the latter trip a distance of 18,000 km) is thought to have been seed-carrying by birds such as petrels (the seeds of these species are not adapted for prolonged immersion in seawater). Both species also have very similar ecological niches, which differ from that of A. melanoxylon.
