= Takamaka, Réunion =

Coordinates: 21°19′7″S 55°48′3″E

Takamaka is a village close to the southeastern tip of the island of Réunion. It is located close to Le Grand Brûlé, the caldera of the Piton de la Fournaise volcano, and is to the northeast of Saint-Philippe.
