= Gyrophoric acid =

Chemical found in some lichens

- Chemical structure of gyrophoric acid

Names
- Preferred IUPAC name 4-({4-[(2,4-Dihydroxy-6-methylbenzoyl)oxy]-2-hydroxy-6-methylbenzoyl}oxy)-2-hydroxy-6-methylbenzoic acid

Identifiers
CAS Number	548-89-0
3D model (JSmol)	Interactive image
ChEMBL	ChEMBL470648
ChemSpider	119550
PubChem CID	135728
UNII	BAQ44A6C6H
CompTox Dashboard (EPA)	DTXSID30203289
- InChI: InChI=1S/C24H20O10/c1-10-4-13(25)7-16(26)20(10)23(31)34-15-6-12(3)21(18(28)9-15)24(32)33-14-5-11(2)19(22(29)30)17(27)8-14/h4-9,25-28H,1-3H3,(H,29,30) Key: ATQPZSQVWCPVGV-UHFFFAOYSA-N
- SMILES: O=C(Oc1cc(c(C(=O)O)c(O)c1)C)c3c(cc(OC(=O)c2c(cc(O)cc2O)C)cc3O)C

Properties
Chemical formula	C_{24}H_{20}O_{10}
Molar mass	468.414 g·mol^{−1}
- Except where otherwise noted, data are given for materials in their standard state (at 25 °C [77 °F], 100 kPa). verify (what is ?) Infobox references

Gyrophoric acid is a tridepside. It is a double ester of the orsellinic acid. It can also be found in most of the species of the lichen genera Actinogyra, Lasallia, and Umbilicaria .

== Natural occurrence and biosynthesis ==
Gyrophoric acid is an orcinol-derived tridepside, meaning it is built from three orsellinic acid units linked by ester bonds. In nature the compound reaches its highest concentrations in rock-dwelling Umbilicaria lichens, but smaller amounts occur in several other genera, including Cryptothecia, Xanthoparmelia, Actinogyra and Lasallia. Gyrophoric acid often co-exists with simpler didepsides such as lecanoric acid, suggesting a shared metabolic origin.

Pharmacologically, gyrophoric acid has been demonstrated to possess broad-spectrum antimicrobial activity and a marked cytotoxic effect against a range of cancer cell lines in in vitro laboratory tests; it also absorbs ultraviolet radiation and has historically served as a natural dye and sunscreen for the lichen thallus. Laboratory screens suggesting antiproliferative and antioxidant actions make the molecule a potential lead for future drug development campaigns—provided supply problems can be solved, because wild lichens grow slowly and yield is low.

A 2022 long-read genomic survey of nine Umbilicaria species has now uncovered the compound's putative biosynthetic gene cluster. All producing species share a single non-reducing polyketide synthase (classified as PKS16) flanked by only two conserved neighbouring genes; the rest of the cluster (nine to fifteen open reading frames, depending on the species) is remarkably variable, which may explain the minor side-products frequently detected in high-performance liquid chromatography traces. The study shows that the polyketide synthase alone appears able to assemble the complete tridepside backbone, removing the need for any tailoring enzymes. This discovery opens the door to heterologous expression and combinatorial biosynthesis, giving chemists and microbiologists a realistic path to engineered analogues with improved potency or pharmacokinetics—and to scalable, fermentation-based manufacture that does not rely on harvesting slow-growing lichens.

== Related compounds ==
Collectively termed the gyrophoric acid chemosyndrome, a small family of structurally related tridepsides derives directly from gyrophoric acid. Once the parent tridepside has been assembled, fungal secondary metabolite enzymes can introduce further tailoring steps—most commonly decarboxylation, O-methylation, and/or ring C-hydroxylation. Each modification subtly alters polarity, ultraviolet absorption, and bioactivity, giving the lichen a broader chemical repertoire while preserving the characteristic orsellinic acid backbone.

Four naturally occurring mono-O-methyl congeners have been characterised so far. Methyl gyrophorate and 4-O-methylgyrophoric acid represent simple single-site methylations, whereas umbilicaric acid and ovoic acid combine methylation with either decarboxylation or additional oxidative changes. These derivatives are typically produced alongside the parent compound in Umbilicaria and related genera, and their relative proportions can vary markedly between species, habitats, or even individual thalli—an observation that underpins chemotaxonomic studies within the gyrophoric acid-producing lichens.
