= Xyloschistes =

Scientific classification
- Kingdom: Fungi
- Division: Ascomycota
- Class: Lecanoromycetes
- Order: Ostropales
- Family: Stictidaceae
- Genus: Xyloschistes; Vain. ex Zahlbr. (1903)
- Species: X. platytropa

Binomial name
- Xyloschistes platytropa (Nyl.) Vain. ex Zahlbr. (1903)

Synonyms
- Xylographa platytropa Nyl. (1868); Xyloschistomyces platytropae Cif. & Tomas. (1953)

Single-species lichen genus

Xyloschistes is a fungal genus in the family Stictidaceae. It is monospecific, containing the single species Xyloschistes platytropa. This fungus is a wood-dwelling species that typically develops subcortically: a thin, whitish thallus forms beneath bark on old timber and dead pine branches, and small black fruiting bodies later break through to the surface. It is known from Finland, where it was first collected in the 1860s, and has also been reported from Spain. In Finland it is currently treated as endangered.

The species was described by William Nylander in 1868 as Xylographa platytropa, and the genus was later validated by Alexander Zahlbruckner to accommodate it. Modern multigene molecular studies place Xyloschistes firmly within Stictidaceae, close to Ingvariella (and near Cryptodiscus and Geisleria), and interpret its life mode as primarily saprotrophic—consistent with the weak or occasional lichenisation reported in older accounts.

== Taxonomy ==
The genus was created to accommodate a species first described by William Nylander in 1868 as Xylographa platytropa, based on Finnish material collected on wood; Nylander provided a full Latin diagnosis and measurements for the species.

Edvard Vainio subsequently proposed the segregate genus Xyloschistes in 1883 and made the new combination Xyloschistes platytropa for Nylander's species. However, as currently interpreted by Index Fungorum, Vainio's generic name was not validly published under the botanical code (Art. 38.1(a), Shenzhen Code).

Alexander Zahlbruckner later published the genus validly in 1903 as Xyloschistes Vain. ex Zahlbr. in Engler & Prantl's "Die natürlichen Pflanzenfamilien". Zahlbruckner did not indicate a type at publication; Clements and Shear (1931) subsequently designated Xyloschistes platytropa as the type species.

Modern multigene analyses place Xyloschistes within the family Stictidaceae and clarify its nearest relatives. A family-wide three-marker study (mtSSU+LSU+ITS) recovered X. platytropa as a distinct lineage in Stictidaceae, adjacent to the lichenised genus Ingvariella and close to Geisleria; ancestral-state reconstructions in the same work code Xyloschistes as saprotrophic. A later analysis using concatenated mtSSU+LSU data (with ITS analysed separately) likewise placed Xyloschistes with Ingvariella and Cryptodiscus, with the newly segregated Absconditella resolved as the sister lineage. Stictidaceae, as presently circumscribed, contains both lichenised and non-lichenised lineages, a mix that accords with the classic concept of Xyloschistes.

== Description ==
Xyloschistes platytropa grows on wood, usually on bark or decorticated branches. The thallus is poorly developed—a vague, whitish patch that may lie beneath the bark—and is reported with a green alga of the Palmella-type as its photosynthetic partner (photobiont).

The apothecia (disc-like fruiting bodies) are at first immersed in the substrate and then break through, changing from urn-shaped to nearly flat with a thin, slightly raised margin. They are black, round to elongate, and about 0.5 mm across. The hymenium (spore-bearing layer) is about 40 μm thick; the upper and lower tissues around it (epithecium and hypothecium) are brownish, and the exciple is darker, almost black. The supporting threads (paraphyses) are rather loosely coherent and relatively thick, with somewhat darkened tips. In iodine reagents the hymenial gel shows a weak bluish staining reaction that soon shifts to yellowish or wine-red tones.

The asci usually contain a single ascospore (rarely two). The spores are long and narrow, initially with several cross-walls and eventually becoming muriform—that is, divided into many cells by both transverse and longitudinal walls; they mature to brownish-black. Reported measurements place them at roughly 22–36 μm long by 6–8 μm wide.

== Habitat and distribution ==
Early accounts agree that Xyloschistes platytropa is a wood-dwelling lichen. It grows on timber and on debarked twigs (especially pine), and is often subcortical: the thallus develops beneath the bark and the fruiting bodies later break through. Reported microhabitats include fence wood and dead, barkless pine branches.

All cited nineteenth-century records are from Finland. Nylander listed material from northern Karelia (near Lieksa) and from the municipality of Inari, Finland (near Veskoniemi), while Zahlbruckner noted a specimen from Evois documented by Johan Petter Norrlin in 1866. The 2021 Finnish national lichen checklist confirms the species for Finland and repeats the wood-dwelling type citation, matching these nineteenth-century accounts. It has also been reported from Spain. In Finland, the species is assessed as Endangered (EN) in the 2019 national Red List under criteria C1 and D, indicating a small population with inferred or observed decline and a very small or restricted population; the assessment places it in the forest wood-habitat group. In 2010 it had been listed as Data Deficient. Ancestral-state analyses interpret Xyloschistes as saprotrophic, with Ingvariella as a nearby lichenised relative.
