= Absconditella viridithallina =

Scientific classification
- Kingdom: Fungi
- Division: Ascomycota
- Class: Lecanoromycetes
- Order: Ostropales
- Family: Stictidaceae
- Genus: Absconditella
- Species: A. viridithallina

Binomial name
- Absconditella viridithallina Kalb & Aptroot (2018)

Species of lichen-forming fungus

Absconditella viridithallina is a species of crustose lichen in the family Stictidaceae. Found in South America, it was formally described as a new species in 2018 by lichenologists Klaus Kalb and André Aptroot. The type specimen was collected by Kalb at a location between Osasco and Cabreúva (São Paulo State) at an altitude of about 750 m (2,460 ft); here it was found growing on wood in a montane rainforest. The specific epithet refers to the olive-green colour of the thallus. The lichen is known to occur in montane forests of Brazil and Venezuela, where it grows on bark and on wood. Similar species in genus Absconditella include A. delutula and A. termitariicola, both of which have longer ascospores and smaller algal cells.

== See also ==
- List of lichens of Brazil
