= Absconditella amabilis =

Scientific classification
- Kingdom: Fungi
- Division: Ascomycota
- Class: Lecanoromycetes
- Order: Ostropales
- Family: Stictidaceae
- Genus: Absconditella
- Species: A. amabilis

Binomial name
- Absconditella amabilis T.Sprib. (2009)
- Holotype: Glacier National Park, British Columbia

Species of lichen

Absconditella amabilis is a rarely collected bark-dwelling lichen in the family Stictidaceae, first described in 2009 from the spray zone of a waterfall in the inland temperate rainforest of British Columbia. DNA-barcoded material from two humid montane forests in the Czech Republic has since shown that the species has a disjunct boreal–temperate range, persisting in permanently wet microsites on soaked conifer wood or living twigs. It produces minute, cream-coloured fruiting bodies that scarcely break the substrate surface and depends on constant moisture to survive.

== Taxonomy ==
The species was described in 2009 by Toby Spribille during a survey of old-growth inland rainforests in British Columbia. It belongs to the ostropalean genus Absconditella, a small group of lichens placed in the family Stictidaceae. Within the genus it is most closely compared with A. lignicola and A. trivialis, but it differs from the former in having markedly smaller fruit-bodies and narrower ascospores, and from the latter in its much shorter spores. The distinguishing combination of traits—a wax-coloured, flat-topped ascoma, a thin non-amyloid hymenium and three-celled spores no more than 15 μm long—clearly separates it from all previously named members of the genus.

The specific epithet amabilis is Latin for "lovely", chosen by the author to reflect the delicate appearance of the tiny fruit-bodies. The holotype was collected from Bear Creek Falls, Glacier National Park, B.C. and is deposited in the herbarium of the University of British Columbia. In the first European report of the species, Vondrák and colleagues in 2024 recorded two Czech specimens whose ITS and mtSSU sequences match the phenotype of the Canadian type material. Because no DNA sequence is yet available from the North American holotype, the authors retained the name A. amabilis for the European material but noted that future sequencing may reveal cryptic divergence from the Canadian population.

== Description ==
Absconditella amabilis forms no visible crust on the bark. Instead, its fungal filaments grow within the outer corky layers of the host tree (an endosubstratal habit), and its green-algal partner appears only as scattered, jelly-sheathed cells about 6 μm across. The fruit-bodies are minute, dome-shaped structures (technically perithecioid ascomata) that break through the bark surface. They are cream to pale yellow, 0.06–0.13 mm in diameter and 60–90 μm tall; a paler, flat to slightly cupped disc sits inside a persistent, waxy rim. Inside, the spore-bearing layer (hymenium) is around 50 μm high and is not stained by iodine solutions, indicating a non-amyloid wall structure. Eight spores develop in each slender cylindrical ascus; the spores are usually three-celled, narrowly ellipsoid, 10–15 μm long by 3–4.5 μm wide, with delicate, colourless walls. No secondary metabolites were detected by spot tests or thin-layer chromatography, and no asexual reproductive bodies (pycnidia) have been observed.

Czech collections share all diagnostic characters of the type but tend to develop slightly larger apothecia (0.10–0.20 mm across versus 0.06–0.13 mm) and have a very faint yellow-ochre hue in the subhymenium when fresh. All other micromorphological and chemical traits agree with Spribille's original description.

== Habitat and distribution ==
The type material of A. amabilis was collected in the inland temperate rainforest gorge of Glacier National Park, British Columbia, where the lichen grows endosubstratally on the bark of western hemlock (Tsuga heterophylla) 0.5–2 m above ground. The site lies within the perpetual spray of Bear Creek Falls, and the surrounding epiphytic community includes moisture-dependent taxa such as Parmeliopsis ambigua, a Lepraria species, and members of the Micarea prasina group. It has also been collected from the Thompson Plateau in B.C.

Two Czech records from the Jizerské hory and Krkonoše Mountains extend the range to Central Europe and confirm the species' reliance on permanently wet conifer substrates. In these montane forests it colonises soaked deadwood embedded in a brook bed and, at a second site, a living Picea twig in a boggy stand between 750 m and 800 m elevation. Environmental-DNA screening of 20 humid stream corridors detected the taxon at seven localities – one below 500 m, three between 500 m and 1,000 m, and three above 1,000 m – indicating a patchy distribution across all altitudinal belts surveyed. Throughout its known range A. amabilis behaves as a moisture-loving microhabitat specialist that persists where continuous moisture and intact forest cover maintain stable spray or seepage conditions on conifer bark and wood.
