= Acarosporina =

Scientific classification
- Kingdom: Fungi
- Division: Ascomycota
- Class: Lecanoromycetes
- Order: Ostropales
- Family: Stictidaceae
- Genus: Acarosporina; Sherwood (1977)

Type species
- Acarosporina monilifera (Ellis & Everh.) Sherwood (1977)

Species
- A. berberidis A. hormospora A. hyalina A. microspora A. monilifera

Genus of fungi

Acarosporina is a genus of plant-parasitic fungi in the family Stictidaceae. The genus was created in 1977 and contains five species. These fungi form small, cup-shaped fruiting bodies that break through the bark surface of infected trees. They are typically found on damaged or diseased bark, particularly on cankers of oak, beech, and maple trees. The genus is distinguished by its unusual ascospores, which break apart into numerous tiny fragments inside the fruiting body.

== Taxonomy ==
Acarosporina was established as a new genus by Martha Allen Sherwood in 1977 to accommodate bark-dwelling ascomycetes that had been placed mainly in Schizoxylon or in Stictis section Cyclostoma but differed in a consistent set of characters. Sherwood designated Schizoxylon moniliferum as the type, making the new combination Acarosporina monilifera. She also transferred Schizoxylon microsporum Davidson & Lorenz (1938) as A. microspora and described A. berberidis as a new species growing on barberry (Berberis) in Pakistan, so the genus originally comprised three species.

The circumscription was based on the distinctive spore development and associated anatomy. In Acarosporina, the fruiting bodies begin immersed in the bark and become erumpent, cup-shaped discs with an entire, dark margin and a pale ochraceous to brown disc. The margin is three-layered in section, with a conspicuous crystalline layer and abundant periphysioids; the subhymenium rests directly on host tissue. The asci are cylindrical with a distinct apical cap and stain blue in iodine (J+). Spores are produced in great numbers because the initially long, many-septate threadlike spores disarticulate into minute, unicellular "part-spores" inside or soon after leaving the ascus. Sherwood used this combination of polyspory with extremely small part-spores, together with the cupulate anatomy, to separate Acarosporina from superficially similar Stictis and Schizoxylon.

Sherwood explained the name as alluding to Acarospora, a lichen genus known for its many-spored asci and very small spores, reflecting the same key feature in Acarosporina. She also cautioned that specimens with much larger part-spores and a different suite of characters should remain in Stictis section Cyclostoma, indicating that disarticulating spores alone are not sufficient for generic placement.

Multi-gene phylogenies sampling Acarosporina microspora place Acarosporina within the Stictis (sensu stricto) clade of Stictidaceae. Those analyses showed Stictis to be polyphyletic, with several small genera—including Acarosporina, Glomerobolus and Ostropa—nested inside it; the authors therefore refrained from reclassification pending broader sampling.

== Description ==
The fruiting bodies (apothecia) of Acarosporina begin immersed in the bark and then break through the surface (erumpent) to form small, cup-shaped discs. The margin is entire and usually dark brown to black, while the disc is pale ochre to brown and sits deeply within the cup, often pulling away from the margin as it dries. In section, the margin is characteristically three-layered: a thick, dark outer wall; a distinct crystalline layer; and a zone rich in periphysioids—short, hair-like sterile elements that line the inner wall. The hymenial tissue rests directly on the host bark (or on a continuation of the wall) and is underlain by a thin subhymenium of small, angular, colorless cells. Paraphyses are numerous, thread-like, and commonly branched. The asci are cylindrical, with a distinct apical cap and an amyloid reaction—turning blue in iodine (J+)—a feature used by Sherwood to separate the genus from superficially similar taxa.

Spore development is distinctive. Each ascus produces long, very slender spores divided by many transverse septa; these soon break apart (disarticulate) into countless minute, one-celled "part-spores". After separating, the part-spores elongate, so that an ascus becomes filled with swarms of tiny, more-than-eight-seriate spores. This combination of polyspory with extremely small part-spores, together with the cupulate anatomy and iodine-positive ascus wall, defines Acarosporina and distinguishes it from Stictis sect. Cyclostoma and from Schizoxylon. Some species also produce asexual states with dark-walled pycnidia that generate simple, colorless conidia.

== Habitat and distribution ==
Acarosporina species develop on the bark of woody hosts, most often on cankered tissue where the fungus erupts through the surface. The type species, A. monilifera, is recorded on cankers of oak (Quercus) and beech (Fagus) in eastern North America. A. microspora occurs on bark cankers of maple (Acer) in the same region and is considered rare. A. berberidis was described from branches of Berberis in Pakistan. Across the genus the hymenium sits directly on host tissue and several species are regarded as parasitic on living bark; collections are scattered and local. Consistent with its bark-canker habit, the genus is treated as plant-parasitic within Stictidaceae, a family that otherwise spans saprobes and optionally lichenized lineages.

== Species ==
- Acarosporina berberidis Sherwood (1977)
- Acarosporina hormospora (Speg.) Sherwood (1977)
- Acarosporina hyalina P.R.Johnst. (1985)
- Acarosporina microspora (R.W.Davidson & R.C.Lorenz) Sherwood (1977)
- Acarosporina monilifera (Ellis & Everh.) Sherwood (1977)
