= Ostropomyces =

Scientific classification
- Domain: Eukaryota
- Kingdom: Fungi
- Division: Ascomycota
- Class: Lecanoromycetes
- Order: Ostropales
- Family: Stictidaceae
- Genus: Ostropomyces; Thiyagaraja, Lücking, Ertz & K.D.Hyde (2021)

Type species
- Ostropomyces pruinosellus Thiyagaraja, Lücking, Ertz & K.D.Hyde (2021)

Species
- O. pruinosellus O. thailandicus

Genus of lichens

Ostropomyces is a genus of fungi in the family Stictidaceae. It has two species, both of which are found in tropical forests in northern Thailand, where they grow as saprotrophs on bark.

== Taxonomy ==
The genus was circumscribed in 2021 by Vinodhini Thiyagaraja, Robert Lücking, Damien Ertz, and Kevin Hyde, with O. pruinosellus assigned as the type species. Ostropomyces is named for its similarity to genus Ostropa.

Molecular phylogenetic analysis shows that Ostropomyces and Ostropa are closely related, but the former differs from the latter in the presence of perithecial ascomata, the presence of periphysoids on the inner wall, the lack of an apical cap in the ascus, and four-spored asci. In contrast, Ostropa has circular ascomata opening by a transverse slit, periphysoids in the above part, a prominent apical cap in the ascus, and eight-spored or polysporous asci.

== Description ==
Ostropomyces have a whitish, pruinose thallus. The sexual morph of this genus includes perithecial ascomata that are typically solitary and either immersed or erumpent, with a distinct ostiole. The exciple has a clear border between the outer and inner layer, while the hamathecium comprises filamentous paraphyses that are septate, branched, hyaline, and filamentous. The asci are cylindrical and bitunicate, while the ascospores are overlapping and uniseriate, with a hyaline, transversely multi-septate structure. The cells of the ascospores are almost of equal size and deeply constricted at the septa of each cell, which allows them to easily break into small septate part-spores.

In its asexual morph, Ostropomyces develops erumpent, spherical pycnidia with a wall that shows two distinct layers in transverse section. The outer layer is hyaline and densely packed, while the inner layer is hyaline, loosely packed, and elongate in the pycnidial neck. Conidiophores line the inside and outside of the pycnidia wall, while the conidiogenous cells are hyaline. The conidia are similar in shape to the ascospores, being filiform, aseptate, hyaline, and guttulate at maturity.
