= Absconditella rosea =

Scientific classification
- Domain: Eukaryota
- Kingdom: Fungi
- Division: Ascomycota
- Class: Lecanoromycetes
- Order: Ostropales
- Family: Stictidaceae
- Genus: Absconditella
- Species: A. rosea

Binomial name
- Absconditella rosea Kalb & Aptroot (2018)

Species of lichen

Absconditella rosea is a species of crustose lichen in the family Stictidaceae. Found in Venezuela, it was formally described as a new species in 2018 by lichenologists Klaus Kalb and André Aptroot. The type specimen was collected at a location between Laguna Mucubají and Pico Mucuñuque (Mérida) at an altitude of about 3,500 m (11,500 ft); here it was found growing on detritus in páramo. The specific epithet refers to the pale pinkish colour of the ascomata. The lichen is only known to occur in Venezuela. A similar species in genus Absconditella is A. lignicola, which can be distinguished from A. rosea by its whitish apothecia and differences in ascospore morphology.
