= Absconditella antarctica =

Scientific classification
- Domain: Eukaryota
- Kingdom: Fungi
- Division: Ascomycota
- Class: Lecanoromycetes
- Order: Ostropales
- Family: Stictidaceae
- Genus: Absconditella
- Species: A. antarctica

Binomial name
- Absconditella antarctica Søchting & Vězda (2004)

Species of lichen

Absconditella antarctica is a species of terricolous (ground-dwelling) crustose lichen in the family Stictidaceae. It is found on Livingston Island in Antarctica.

== Taxonomy ==
The lichen was described as a new species in 2004 by Ulrik Søchting and Antonín Vězda in their floristic survey of the Hurd Peninsula, Livingston Island. The type was gathered on 17 February 1998 from a south-facing crevice near the summit of Mount Reina Sofía (277 m) where the lichen formed a thin, gelatinous crust on peaty soil and decomposing plant remains. The epithet antarctica reflects its polar range. Søchting and Vězda placed the fungus in Absconditella because it shares the genus's diagnostic suite: low gyalectoid apothecia with a clear excipulum, a comparatively tall hymenium, cylindrical asci capped by a distinct tholus, and colourless one-septate spores whose walls—and the hymenial tissues—turn wine-red when stained with iodine.

== Description ==
Absconditella antarctica forms a thin, blackish-green crust that spreads over decaying plant fragments and peat-rich soil. When it wets, the thallus swells into a jelly-like film—a consequence of its partnership with single-celled green algae (a chlorococcoid photobiont). The crust is only fractions of a millimetre thick and looks more like a soot-grey stain than a lichen body. Scattered across the surface are minute, pale yellow–ochre fruiting bodies 0.2–0.25 mm wide. These "gyalectoid" apothecia—so called because their low, cup-shaped profile recalls those of the genus Gyalecta—sit half-embedded in the substrate; a thick, entire rim surrounds a concave yellow-brown disc. A section shows a glass-clear excipulum (the outer tissue) and a hymenium about 100 μm high. Treating the section with iodine turns the hymenium, asci and ascospores wine-red (I+), a handy diagnostic reaction.

Microscopically, each ascus contains eight colourless, one-septate spores that are narrowly ellipsoid (18–22 × about 4.5 μm) with a thin wall and a median septum. The unbranched paraphyses are hair-fine (1–1.5 μm) but end in slightly swollen tips that support the hymenial surface. No secondary metabolites have been detected, so the species is recognised by the combination of its semi-immersed Dimerella pineti-like apothecia, two-celled spores, iodine reaction, and its preference for moist, humus-laden niches.
