= Acarosporina microspora =

Scientific classification
- Domain: Eukaryota
- Kingdom: Fungi
- Division: Ascomycota
- Class: Lecanoromycetes
- Order: Ostropales
- Family: Stictidaceae
- Genus: Acarosporina
- Species: A. microspora

Binomial name
- Acarosporina microspora (R.W.Davidson & R.C.Lorenz) Sherwood (1977)

Synonyms
- Schizoxylon microsporum R.W.Davidson & R.C.Lorenz (1938)

Species of fungus

Acarosporina microspora is a species of fungus in the family Stictidaceae. A plant pathogen, it causes a condition in elms known as Schizoxylon canker. It was originally described in 1938 under the name Schizoxylon microsporum.
