= Nanostictis caucasica =

Scientific classification
- Domain: Eukaryota
- Kingdom: Fungi
- Division: Ascomycota
- Class: Lecanoromycetes
- Order: Ostropales
- Family: Stictidaceae
- Genus: Nanostictis
- Species: N. caucasica

Binomial name
- Nanostictis caucasica Zhurb. (2017)

Species of fungus

Nanostictis caucasica is a species of lichenicolous (lichen-eating) fungus in the family Stictidaceae. It is known to occur only in a single locality in the North Caucasus region of Southern Russia, where it grows parasitically on the foliose lichen Parmelia sulcata.

== Taxonomy ==
Nanostictis caucasica was formally described as a new species in 2017 by Russian lichenologist Mikhail Zhurbenko. The type specimen was collected from a northern spur of Gora Armovka, a mountain in Krasnodar Krai. There, at an altitude of 1,830 m (6,000 ft), the fungus was found growing on the lobes of the foliose lichen Parmelia sulcata, which itself was growing on Betula litwinowii in a forest at the upper boundary of the mountain forest belt.

== Description ==
The fungus produces cup-shaped apothecia that are 250–600 μm in diameter; they emerge through the thallus surface of the host until they are about half or more exposed. They have a dull white, persistent margin that is grainy due to the crystal depositions on the surface. The asci are somewhat cylindrical with a rounded tip, and typical dimensions of 67–86 by 8–10.5 μm. Most of the asci contain eight ascospores, although in rare instances they only have four. The ascospores are hyaline, usually have between 10 and 16 septa, and measure 53.7–73.7 by 3.0–3.8 μm.

The type species of genus Nanostictis, N. peltigerae, has a morphology that is similar to N. caucasica. They differ in microscopic characteristics, such as numbers of spores in the ascus, spore septation, and spore size.
