= Lecanora mugambii =

Scientific classification
- Kingdom: Fungi
- Division: Ascomycota
- Class: Lecanoromycetes
- Order: Lecanorales
- Family: Lecanoraceae
- Genus: Lecanora
- Species: L. mugambii

Binomial name
- Lecanora mugambii Kirika, I.Schmitt, Fankhauser & Lumbsch (2011)

Species of lichen

Lecanora mugambii is a species of crustose lichen in the family Lecanoraceae. Found in western Kenya, it was described as new to science in 2011.

== Taxonomy ==
Lecanora mugambii was first discovered and described by Paul Kirika, Imke Schmitt, Johnathon Fankhauser, and H. Thorsten Lumbsch in 2011. The holotype specimen was found in Kenya's Western Province, on the slopes of Mount Elgon Forest; there it was growing on large boulders in remnant cloud forest. This lichen differentiates from Lecanora glaucodea in terms of its thicker thallus, broader ascospores and the presence of alectoronic acid.

== Description ==
The physical attributes of Lecanora mugambii include a thin to thick thallus, ranging in appearance from verrucose to verruculose-bullate and possessing a whitish-grey colour. Its surface is smooth and lacks both isidia and soredia. This lichen bears sessile, abundant, and dispersed apothecia that range from 0.6–1.5 mm in diameter. These apothecia have grey to grey-brown discs under a thick, granulose, whitish grey to bluish-grey pruina. Its ascospores are non-septate, hyaline, broadly ellipsoid to somewhat spherical, measuring 11–15 by 7–10.5 μm. The lichen's biochemistry reveals the presence of several compounds, including alectoronic acid, atranorin, chloroatranorin, physodic acid, usnic acid, and other unidentified alectoronic acid derivatives.

== Similar species ==
Lecanora mugambii shares some similarities with Lecanora glaucodea, a species native to the neotropics, but can be distinguished by its thicker, bullate thallus, larger apothecia, broader ascospores, and a distinct chemical composition. The species also bears resemblance to Lecanora formosula, which can be however readily identified by its thin thallus, slightly pruinose apothecial discs, smaller ascospores, and a different chemical profile.

== Habitat and distribution ==
Lecanora mugambii has been found on siliceous rocks in exposed locations on the edge of a remnant cloud forest. Its known habitat is limited to its type locality at an elevation of 2,500 m (8,200 ft), where it is quite common. This lichen coexists with other species such as Diploschistes scruposus, Ingvariella bispora, Pertusaria subventosa, and species from the genera Heterodermia, Punctelia, Tephromela, and Xanthoparmelia.

== See also ==
- List of Lecanora species
