= Sphaeropezia =

Scientific classification
- Kingdom: Fungi
- Division: Ascomycota
- Class: Lecanoromycetes
- Order: Ostropales
- Family: Stictidaceae
- Genus: Sphaeropezia; Sacc. (1884)

Type species
- Sphaeropezia alpina (Sacc.) Sacc. (1884)

Synonyms
- Bryodiscus B.Hein (1971); Lethariicola Grummann (1969)

Genus of fungi

Sphaeropezia is a genus of fungi in the family Stictidaceae. These tiny fungi produce small, dark, cup-shaped fruiting bodies that begin buried in their substrate and later push through the surface, opening by a central, star-shaped pore. The genus includes species with diverse lifestyles: some decompose dead wood and plant material, whilst others live as parasites on mosses, lichens, or even other fungi. Most species are found in cool, high-latitude or high-elevation regions of the Northern Hemisphere, where their minute, easily overlooked fruiting bodies make them appear genuinely rare.

== Taxonomy ==
Sphaeropezia was originally circumscribed by Pier Andrea Saccardo in 1884, but most of its species were later rolled into Odontotrema. A multilocus phylogeny published in 2012 showed that the family Odontotremataceae is polyphyletic: the type species O. phacidioides belongs to the "true" Odontotremataceae, whereas the clade containing "Odontotrema" cassiopes, "O." diffindens, several lichenicolous species and Bryodiscus arctoalpinus sits deep inside Stictidaceae. Because Sphaeropezia is the oldest available name for that second lineage, the authors reinstated it as a valid genus within Stictidaceae.

The same study synonymised the bryophyte-parasitic Bryodiscus and the lichenicolous Lethariicola with Sphaeropezia, making the latter the formal home for both saprotrophic and lichen-inhabiting species. It also transferred seven former Odontotrema taxa (S. arctoalpina, S. cassiopes, S. grimmiae, S. hepaticarum, S. melaneliae, S. ochrolechiae and S. thamnoliae) and recommended moving all remaining lichenicolous Odontotrema species—except O. stereocaulicola—to Sphaeropezia. Three previously undescribed members were added at the same time: S. capreae (wood-inhabiting), S. lyckselensis (fungicolous on Melittosporiella hymenia) and S. mycoblasti (lichenicolous on Mycoblastus). With these changes Sphaeropezia now encompasses saprobes, bryophyte parasites and lichenicolous fungi, while Odontotrema (in the strict sense) is restricted to a small, wood-dwelling core in Odontotremataceae.

== Description ==
Sphaeropezia lacks a lichen thallus and lives as a saprotroph on decaying organic matter or occasionally on other fungi. Its minute fruiting bodies begin buried in the substrate as rounded apothecia. As they mature they push partly or completely through the surface, remaining deeply cup-shaped (urceolate) and opening by a central, star-fissured pore. Mature apothecia are dark grey to brown and may carry a dusting of white pruina.

The wall (exciple) is built from tightly bound hyphae that grade into a layer of periphysoids lining the pore. Within, the hymenium sits in an iodine positive-staining (I+ blue) gelatinous matrix and is threaded with slender paraphyses that are either simple or forked near the tips. Cylindrical asci each hold eight or more ascospores, show a distinct apical cap, and react weakly or not at all to iodine. The spores themselves range from ellipsoidal to thread-like; they are colourless, multi-septate and—in one species—can fragment into tiny, single-celled propagules. No asexual fruit-bodies have been observed, and thin-layer chromatography has not revealed any characteristic secondary metabolites.

== Habitat and distribution ==
Species of Sphaeropezia exploit a wide range of cool, nutrient-poor microhabitats. Many behave as wood-rotters on weather-bleached twigs, stumps or standing trunks, or on dead herbaceous stems in sunny, rather dry situations. Others live as specialised parasites or commensals on mosses, leafy or fruticose lichens, and even on the old fruiting bodies of other fungi, so the genus spans saprobic, bryophilous, lichenicolous and fungicolous life-styles. Because the tiny, blackish apothecia are easily overlooked and often sparsely scattered, Sphaeropezia is seldom collected and most species appear genuinely rare.

Records are concentrated in high-latitude or high-elevation regions of the Northern Hemisphere. Several species are known only from boreal Scandinavia—for example S. capreae, which has been found in a single district near Lycksele, northern Sweden. Arctic occurrences extend to Svalbard and Greenland (S. cassiopes), while isolated temperate outliers include collections from Oregon, USA (S. mycoblasti). The authors note that known records are concentrated in boreal and Arctic–alpine regions, with only a few montane collections farther south.

== Species ==
As of July 2025, Species Fungorum (in the Catalogue of Life) accept 24 species of Sphaeropezia.

- Sphaeropezia arctoalpina (Döbbeler & Poelt) Baloch, Gilenstam & Wedin (2013)
- Sphaeropezia bryoriae (Diederich & Etayo) Baloch & Wedin (2013)
- Sphaeropezia capreae Baloch, Gilenstam & Wedin (2013)
- Sphaeropezia cassiopes (Rostr.) Baloch, Gilenstam & Wedin (2013)
- Sphaeropezia cucularis (Norman) Baloch & Wedin (2013)
- Sphaeropezia figulina (Norman) Baloch & Wedin (2013)
- Sphaeropezia grimmiae (B.Hein, E.Müll. & Poelt) Baloch, Gilenstam & Wedin (2013)
- Sphaeropezia hepaticarum (Döbbeler & Poelt) Baloch & Wedin (2013)
- Sphaeropezia intermedia (Diederich, Zhurb. & Etayo) Baloch & Wedin (2013)
- Sphaeropezia japewiae (Zhurb. & Diederich) Baloch & Wedin (2013)
- Sphaeropezia lecanorae (Diederich & G.Marson) Baloch & Wedin (2013)
- Sphaeropezia leucocheila P.R.Johnst. & M.A.M.Renner (2019) – New Zealand
- Sphaeropezia lyckselensis Baloch, Gilenstam & Wedin (2013)
- Sphaeropezia melaneliae (Diederich & Zhurb.) Baloch, Gilenstam & Wedin (2013)
- Sphaeropezia mycoblasti Diederich, Baloch & Wedin (2013)
- Sphaeropezia navarinoi (Etayo) Baloch & Wedin (2013)
- Sphaeropezia ochrolechiae (Diederich, Holien & Zhurb.) Baloch & Wedin (2013)
- Sphaeropezia pertusariae (Etayo, Diederich & Coppins) Baloch & Wedin (2013)
- Sphaeropezia rhizocarpicola (Zhurb., Diederich & Himelbr.) Baloch & Wedin (2013)
- Sphaeropezia santessonii (Zhurb., Etayo & Diederich) Baloch & Wedin (2013)
- Sphaeropezia shangrilaensis Thiyagaraja, Lücking, Ertz & K.D.Hyde (2021)
- Sphaeropezia sipei (Grummann) Baloch & Wedin (2013)
- Sphaeropezia thamnoliae (Zhurb., Diederich & Etayo) Baloch & Wedin (2013)
