= Absconditella termitariicola =

Scientific classification
- Kingdom: Fungi
- Division: Ascomycota
- Class: Lecanoromycetes
- Order: Ostropales
- Family: Stictidaceae
- Genus: Absconditella
- Species: A. termitariicola

Binomial name
- Absconditella termitariicola Aptroot & M.Cáceres (2016)
- Holotype: Amapá National Forest, Brazil

Species of lichen-forming fungus

Absconditella termitariicola is a species of crustose lichen in the family Stictidaceae. This small lichen was discovered in 2016 growing on termite nests attached to trees in the Amazon rainforest of Brazil. It forms thin, olive-green patches with tiny, flask-shaped fruiting structures that are often partially covered by the lichen body.

== Taxonomy ==
Absconditella termitariicola was described as new to science in 2016 by Marcela da Silva Cáceres and André Aptroot, based on material from the Amapá National Forest (Brazilian Amazon). The holotype was collected from a termite nest on a tree in disturbed forest, with additional material from a nearby primary tall forest; the species name refers to its occurrence on termite nests.

The species can be compared with Absconditella delutula, which has whitish, more open fruiting bodies (apothecia) that are never covered by the thallus; in contrast, A. termitariicola has apothecia that are immersed to emergent and often partly overgrown by the thallus.

== Description ==
The thallus of A. termitariicola is thin (under 0.1 mm), smooth to slightly shiny, and olive green, lacking a distinct prothallus. The apothecia are abundant, very small (about 0.15–0.25 mm in diameter), and pale ochraceous; they begin almost closed and then become perithecioid (flask-like) with a small pore (ostiole). The disc is medium brown and deeply concave, with a paler, raised margin. Asci are pyriform (pear-shaped), and the ascospores are hyaline, ellipsoid, and contain a single septum; they are relatively small, measuring 10–12 × 4.0–5.0 μm. No pycnidia were observed.

Standard spot tests were negative (UV−, C−, P−, K−), and thin-layer chromatography detected no lichen products in A. termitariicola.

== Habitat and distribution ==
The species grows on termite nests attached to trees in both disturbed forest and primary tall forest within the eastern Amazon. It is known only from Brazil (Amapá), where it was locally abundant at two nearby localities around about 30 m elevation. A. termitariicola is one of four Absconditella species that have been recorded from Brazil.

== See also ==
- List of lichens of Brazil
