= Nanostictis =

Scientific classification
- Kingdom: Fungi
- Division: Ascomycota
- Class: Lecanoromycetes
- Order: Ostropales
- Family: Stictidaceae
- Genus: Nanostictis; M.S.Christ. (1954)

Type species
- Nanostictis peltigerae M.S.Christ. (1954)

Genus of lichen-forming fungi

Nanostictis is a genus of lichenicolous (lichen-dwelling) fungi in the family Stictidaceae. These tiny fungi produce minute fruiting bodies that remain embedded within their host lichens and are characterised by very slender, thread-like ascospores divided by multiple cross-walls. The genus contains nine species that parasitise various lichen hosts, though its relationship to similar genera remains uncertain due to the lack of molecular studies on any Nanostictis species.

== Taxonomy ==
The genus was circumscribed in 1954 by the Danish lichenologist Mogens Skytte Christiansen, with Nanostictis peltigerae assigned as the type species.

The generic limits of Nanostictis remain unsettled. Its type species was separated from the superficially similar genus Cryptodiscus mainly because it produces very slender, thread-like ascospores and lives exclusively on lichens, usually those in the order Peltigerales. Molecular analysis of two elongated-spored, lichenicolous fungi (C. epicladonia and C. galaninae) showed that they sit firmly within Cryptodiscus, even though they share several outward features with Nanostictis. Their inclusion broadens the morphological concept of Cryptodiscus and blurs the once-clear distinction between the two genera. Because no species of Nanostictis has yet been sampled for DNA, its monophyly and exact placement in the Stictidaceae remain untested; a thorough molecular study will be needed to decide whether Nanostictis should be maintained or merged with related lineages.

== Description ==
Nanostictis is a lichen-inhabiting (lichenicolous) fungus that produces no visible thallus of its own. Its minute apothecia start out completely embedded in the host lichen. They open through a tiny pore but often remain flush with the surface, so the pale disc stays deeply immersed and never splits away from the surrounding rim when dry. The margin itself is thin, colourless and smooth, lacking any crystalline deposits.

The apothecial wall (exciple) is not clearly layered; it is built from short-celled, tightly glued hyphae or small, prismatic cells that may be hard to distinguish in section. The hymenium (fertile spore-bearing tissue) contains numerous thread-like paraphyses that neither branch extensively nor turn blue in iodine tests. Cylindrical asci have thin lateral walls, a distinct apical cap, show no iodine staining reaction, and usually hold eight ascospores. These spores are colourless, very slender (filiform) and divided by many transverse septa. Asexual reproductive bodies (conidiomata) have not been observed.

== Species ==
Nine species are accepted in Nanostictis; all of them are lichenicolous.

- Nanostictis caucasica Zhurb. (2017) – host: Parmelia sulcata
- Nanostictis christiansenii Etayo (1996) – host: Lobaria pulmonaria
- Nanostictis confusa Etayo (2017) – host: Hypotrachyna
- Nanostictis heterodermiae Etayo & Sipman (2017) – host: Heterodermia
- Nanostictis nephromatis Etayo (2008) – host: Nephroma arcticum
- Nanostictis peltigerae M.S.Christ. (1954) – host: Peltigera
- Nanostictis pluriseptata Etayo (2002) – host: Lobariella gr. pallida
- Nanostictis pseudocyphellariae Sherwood (1986) – host: Pseudocyphellaria
- Nanostictis stictae Etayo (2002) – host: Sticta
