= Spirographa ciliata =

Scientific classification
- Domain: Eukaryota
- Kingdom: Fungi
- Division: Ascomycota
- Class: Lecanoromycetes
- Order: Ostropales
- Family: Spirographaceae
- Genus: Spirographa
- Species: S. ciliata

Binomial name
- Spirographa ciliata (Kalb) Flakus, Etayo & Miądl. (2019)

Synonyms
- Cornutispora ciliata Kalb (1993)

Species of lichen

Spirographa ciliata is a species of lichenicolous fungus in the family Spirographaceae. It was first formally described by Klaus Kalb in 1993 as Cornutispora ciliata. Adam Grzegorz Flakus, Javier Etayo, and Jolanta Miądlikowska transferred it to genus Spirographa in 2019.
