= Ramalina baltica =

Scientific classification
- Domain: Eukaryota
- Kingdom: Fungi
- Division: Ascomycota
- Class: Lecanoromycetes
- Order: Lecanorales
- Family: Ramalinaceae
- Genus: Ramalina
- Species: R. baltica

Binomial name
- Ramalina baltica Lettau (1912)

Synonyms
- Ramalina obtusata f. baltica (Lettau) Räsänen (1948)

Species of lichen in the family Ramalinaceae

Ramalina baltica is a species of lichen in the family Ramalinaceae. The lichen was formally described as a new species by Georg Lettau in 1912. It was proposed for inclusion in the red data book of Belarus. It is also found in North America, where it occurs in fog zones of Central California.
