= Propoliopsis =

Scientific classification
- Domain: Eukaryota
- Kingdom: Fungi
- Division: Ascomycota
- Class: Lecanoromycetes
- Order: Ostropales
- Family: Stictidaceae
- Genus: Propoliopsis; Rehm (1914)

Type species
- Propoliopsis arengae Rehm (1914)

Single-species lichen genus

Propoliopsis is a genus of lichenized fungi in the family Stictidaceae. This is a monotypic genus, containing the single species Propoliopsis arengae.
