= Biostictis =

Scientific classification
- Domain: Eukaryota
- Kingdom: Fungi
- Division: Ascomycota
- Class: Lecanoromycetes
- Order: Ostropales
- Family: Stictidaceae
- Genus: Biostictis; Petr. (1950)

Type species
- Biostictis rubiacearum (Pat.) Petr.

Genus of fungi

Biostictis is a genus of fungi within the family Stictidaceae. It contains five species.
