= Delpontia =

Scientific classification
- Domain: Eukaryota
- Kingdom: Fungi
- Division: Ascomycota
- Class: Lecanoromycetes
- Order: Ostropales
- Family: Stictidaceae
- Genus: Delpontia; Penz. & Sacc. (1902)

Type species
- Delpontia pulchella Penz. & Sacc. (1902)

Genus of fungi

Delpontia is a genus of fungi within the family Stictidaceae. It is a monotypic genus, containing the single species Delpontia pulchella.

The genus name of Delpontia is in honour of Giovanni Battista Delponte (1812-1884), who was an Italian botanist and Professor of Botany in Turin.

The genus was circumscribed by Albert Julius Otto Penzig and Pier Andrea Saccardo in Malpighia Vol.15 on page 220 in 1901.
