= Cyanodermella =

Scientific classification
- Kingdom: Fungi
- Division: Ascomycota
- Class: Lecanoromycetes
- Order: Ostropales
- Family: Stictidaceae
- Genus: Cyanodermella; O.E.Erikss. (1981)

Type species
- Cyanodermella viridula (Berk. & M.A.Curtis) O.E.Erikss.

Genus of fungi

Cyanodermella is a genus of fungi within the family Stictidaceae. It contains five species.
