= Odontotrema =

Scientific classification
- Kingdom: Fungi
- Division: Ascomycota
- Class: Lecanoromycetes
- Order: Odontotrematales
- Family: Odontotremataceae
- Genus: Odontotrema; Nyl.

Type species
- Odontotrema phacidioides Nyl.

Genus of fungi

Odontotrema is a genus of fungi in the family Odontotremataceae.

== Species ==
As accepted by Species Fungorum;

- Odontotrema phacidioides Nyl. (1858)
- Odontotrema stereocaulicola Zhurb. (2010)

It has many former species;

- O. affine (E. Bommer, M. Rousseau & Sacc.) Mussat (1901) = Sporormiella affinis, Sporormiaceae
- O. alpinum (Sacc.) L. Holm (1979) = Sphaeropezia alpina, Odontotremataceae
- O. alpinum var. octopartitum Raitv. & Chleb. (2003) = Sphaeropezia alpina, Odontotremataceae
- O. anodontum Nyl. (1869) = Mycowinteria anodonta, Protothelenellaceae
- O. belonosporum Nyl. (1869) = Coccomycetella belonospora, Odontotremataceae
- O. bryoriae Diederich & Etayo (2002) = Sphaeropezia bryoriae, Odontotremataceae
- O. cassiopes (Rostr.) L. Holm (1975) = Sphaeropezia cassiopes, Odontotremataceae
- O. concentricum Stirt. (1884) = Ocellularia concentrica, Graphidaceae
- O. cuculare (Norman) Diederich (2002) = Sphaeropezia cucularis, Odontotremataceae
- O. figulinum (Norman) Diederich (2002) = Sphaeropezia figulina, Odontotremataceae
- O. firmatum Nyl. (1881) = Exarmidium hemisphaericum, Hyponectriaceae
- O. hemisphaericum (Fr.) Rehm (1888) = Exarmidium hemisphaericum, Hyponectriaceae
- O. inclusum (Pers.) P. Karst. (1885) = Exarmidium inclusum, Hyponectriaceae
- O. inclusum subsp. affine E. Bommer, M. Rousseau & Sacc. (1892) = Sporormiella affinis, Sporormiaceae
- O. inclusum var. affine (E. Bommer, M. Rousseau & Sacc.) Boud. (1907) = Sporormiella affinis, Sporormiaceae
- O. intermedium Diederich, Zhurb. & Etayo (2002) = Sphaeropezia intermedia, Odontotremataceae
- O. japewiae Zhurb. & Diederich (2009) = Sphaeropezia japewiae, Odontotremataceae
- O. lecanorae Diederich & G. Marson (2002) = Sphaeropezia lecanorae, Odontotremataceae
- O. longius Nyl. (1871) = Durella atrocyanea, Helotiaceae
- O. majus Leight. (1871) = Exarmidium inclusum, Hyponectriaceae
- O. melaneliae Diederich & Zhurb. (2002) = Sphaeropezia melaneliae, Odontotremataceae
- O. minus sensu auct. brit. = Exarmidium hemisphaericum, Hyponectriaceae
- O. navarinoi Etayo (2008) = Sphaeropezia navarinoi, Odontotremataceae
- O. ochrolechiae Diederich, Holien & Zhurb. (2002) = Sphaeropezia ochrolechiae, Odontotremataceae
- O. pertusariae Etayo, Diederich & Coppins (2002) = Sphaeropezia pertusariae, Odontotremataceae
- O. pini Romell (1895) = Cryptodiscus pini, Stictidaceae
- O. plantagineum (P. Karst.) P. Karst. (1885) = Trochila plantaginea, Cenangiaceae
- O. rhaphidosporum (Rehm) Rehm (1888) = Odontura rhaphidospora, Odontotremataceae
- O. rhizocarpicola Zhurb., Diederich & Himelbr. (2002) = Sphaeropezia rhizocarpicola, Odontotremataceae
- O. rhopalospermum Kirschst. (1938) = Phragmiticola phragmitis, Marthamycetaceae
- O. santessonii Zhurb., Etayo & Diederich (2002) = Sphaeropezia santessonii, Odontotremataceae
- O. sieversiae (E. Müll.) DiCosmo, Nag Raj & W.B. Kendr. (1983) = Phacidium sieversiae, Phacidiaceae
- O. sipei (Grummann) Diederich (2002) = Sphaeropezia sipei, Odontotremataceae
- O. subintegrum Nyl. (1867) = Exarmidium inclusum, Hyponectriaceae
- O. thamnoliae Zhurb., Diederich & Etayo (2002) = Sphaeropezia thamnoliae, Odontotremataceae
