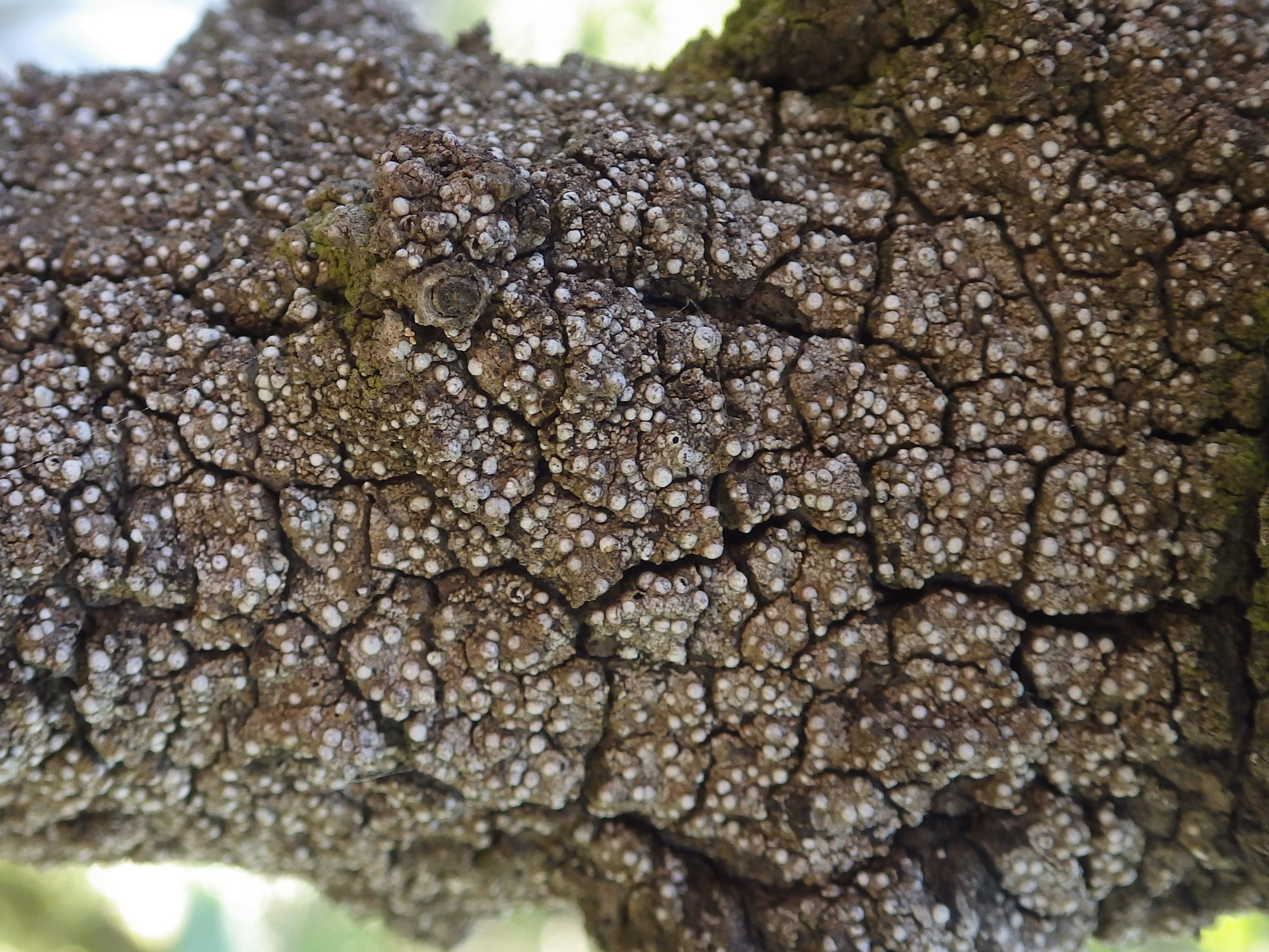
- Thelopsis isiaca in Portugal

Scientific classification
- Kingdom: Fungi
- Division: Ascomycota
- Class: Lecanoromycetes
- Order: Ostropales
- Family: Stictidaceae
- Genus: Thelopsis; Nyl. (1855)

Type species
- Thelopsis rubella Nyl. (1855)

= Thelopsis =

Genus of lichen-forming fungi

Thelopsis is a genus of lichen-forming fungi in the family Gyalectaceae. The genus was established by the Finnish lichenologist William Nylander in 1855 and contains small bark-dwelling crustose lichens that form thin crusts on surfaces. These lichens make flask-shaped fruiting bodies called perithecia, which contain numerous small ascospores divided by cross-walls. Recent molecular studies have revealed that the genus forms a closely related group within the broader Gyalecta complex, leading to taxonomic revisions that now recognise about a dozen species worldwide.

== Taxonomy ==
Thelopsis was circumscribed by the Finnish lichenologist William Nylander in 1855, with Thelopsis rubella as the type species. It is a small, cosmopolitan genus of crustose lichens characterised by globose, semi-gelatinous perithecia with short, stiff periphyses; polysporous asci that stain blue in iodine; and small, transversely septate to sub-muriform, colourless ascospores. Early authors placed the genus in the family Stictidaceae.

Antonín Vězda's 1968 revision treated just six species and suggested links to Ramonia. Subsequent authors noted additional morphological affinities with Topelia; Per Magnus Jørgensen and Vězda even considered moving the genus to the Gyalectales because of features shared with Belonia, although they retained it in the Ostropales at that time.

A multigene phylogeny published in 2021 delivered the first molecular appraisal of these relationships. The analysis showed that the type species T. rubella, along with T. byssoidea and the sterile taxon Opegrapha corticola, forms a strongly supported clade embedded in Gyalecta sensu lato, whereas T. melathelia resolves as sister to Ramonia valenzueliana. To align the taxonomy with these results, O. corticola was recombined as T. corticola, and T. melathelia was transferred to Ramonia. After these adjustments, Thelopsis sensu stricto—the three remaining species—constitutes a well-supported monophyletic group. Because this trio also shares distinctive morphological traits, the authors kept Thelopsis as a separate genus pending broader sampling to clarify the limits of Gyalecta.

Although early authors aligned Thelopsis with the Stictidaceae, multi-gene analyses by Ertz and colleagues (2021) showed that the three core species—T. rubella, T. byssoidea and the newly recombined T. corticola—form a strongly supported clade embedded in the family Gyalectaceae, not Stictidaceae. Building on these results, Cannon and colleagues (2024) adopt a narrower circumscription of Gyalecta that retains well-known genera such as Belonia, Cryptolechia and Pachyphiale and explicitly recognises the perithecial Thelopsis as a monophyletic lineage nested within the broader Gyalecta complex; they note that discarding the genus would render Gyalecta paraphyletic unless the latter were split into several segregate genera. Accordingly, their current treatment places Thelopsis as a distinct but closely allied genus within the Gyalectaceae.

== Description ==
Thelopsis produces a thin, sometimes almost indiscernible crust (a crustose thallus) that is partly embedded in, or slightly raised above, the surface on which it grows; in a few species it can be wispy and cotton-like (byssoid). Thallus colour varies from grey or greenish to orange-red, and a narrow whitish border (prothallus) may be present, though it is occasionally absent. The photosynthetic partner is a trentepohlioid alga—filamentous green algae of the genus Trentepohlia that often impart an orange tinge. Vegetative dispersal is uncommon: only one species develops minute pin-prick soralia that can merge into larger patches and release powdery soredia matching the thallus in colour.

The genus is distinguished by its flask-shaped sexual fruiting bodies (perithecia) which lie within or on the thallus, sometimes presenting as small wart-like bumps. These perithecia range from colourless through reddish brown to black and lack an additional protective outer wall (involucrellum). Their wall (exciple) may comprise flattened cells or distinct filamentous hyphae, and the internal gel shows no staining reaction to iodine. The cavity is threaded with slender, unbranched paraphyses and short periphyses. Each ascus contains numerous colourless ascospores divided by up to three (occasionally five) cross-walls and often surrounded by a delicate outer layer (perispore); in dilute iodine the ascus tip stains blue. Asexual spores are generated in pale, flask-like pycnidia, which in one species are subdivided into several chambers. Spot tests and thin-layer chromatography have so far detected no secondary metabolites (lichen products) in the genus.

== Species ==
As of July 2025, Species Fungorum (in the Catalogue of Life) accept 12 species of Thelopsis, although several more species are considered as accepted by Index Fungorum.

- Thelopsis africana van den Boom (2012) – Cape Verde
- Thelopsis byssoidea Diederich (1997)
- Thelopsis chirisanensis Lőkös, S.Y.Kondr. & Hur (2016) – South Korea
- Thelopsis corticola (Coppins & P. James) Sanderson & Ertz (2021)
- Thelopsis cruciata Aptroot & M.Cáceres (2014) – Brazil
- Thelopsis flavosorediata Aptroot & Schumm (2023)
- Thelopsis foveolata Renob. & Barreno (1996) – Europe
- Thelopsis gangwondoensis S.Y.Kondr., Lőkös, J.-J.Woo & Hur (2018) – South Korea
- Thelopsis isiaca Stizenb. (1895)
- Thelopsis loekoesii S.Y.Kondr., J.P.Halda & Hur (2016) – South Korea
- Thelopsis muriformis Aptroot & K.H.Moon (2009) – South Korea
- Thelopsis obscura Egea & Torrente (1996) – South Africa
- Thelopsis paucispora Breuss & M.Schultz (2007) – Socotra
- Thelopsis rubella Nyl. (1855)
- Thelopsis selenospora C.W.Dodge (1953)
- Thelopsis spinulosa Aptroot (2020) – Brazil
- Thelopsis tholoides Lettau (1940)
- Thelopsis ullungdoensis J.P.Halda, Dong Liu & Hur (2020) – South Korea
- Thelopsis umbratula Nyl. (1875)
