= Robergea =

Scientific classification
- Domain: Eukaryota
- Kingdom: Fungi
- Division: Ascomycota
- Class: Lecanoromycetes
- Order: Ostropales
- Family: Stictidaceae
- Genus: Robergea; Desm.

Type species
- Robergea unica Desm.

Genus of fungi

Robergea is a genus of fungi within the family Stictidaceae.

The genus was circumscribed by Jean-Baptiste Henri Joseph Desmazières in Ann. Sci. Nat. Bot. ser.3, vol.8 on page 177 in 1847.

The genus name of Robergea is in honour of Michel Robert Roberge (1791–1864), who was a French botanist and mycologist. He taught as a teacher at various girls' schools in Caen.

== Species ==
As of September 2022, the following species are accepted by Species Fungorum;

- Robergea cubicularis (Fr.) Bres. (1890)
- Robergea pupula (Tuck.) R.C. Harris (1975)
- Robergea unica Desm. (1847)

Note; R. lageniformis (Sollm.) Bonord. (1864) = Robergea cubicularis
