= Phaneromyces =

Scientific classification
- Kingdom: Fungi
- Division: Ascomycota
- Class: Lecanoromycetes
- Order: Ostropales
- Family: Phaneromycetaceae; Gamundí & Spinedi (1985)
- Genus: Phaneromyces; Speg. & Har. (1889)

Type species
- Phaneromyces macrosporus (Boud.) Speg. (1889)

Species
- P. macrosporus P. platensis

Genus of lichens

Phaneromyces is a genus of lichen-forming fungi in the monotypic family Phaneromycetaceae (order Ostropales). Phaneromyces consists of two species known from temperate South America.
