= Trinathotrema =

Scientific classification
- Kingdom: Fungi
- Division: Ascomycota
- Class: Lecanoromycetes
- Order: Ostropales
- Family: Stictidaceae
- Genus: Trinathotrema; Lücking, Rivas Plata & Mangold (2011)

Type species
- Trinathotrema stictideum (Nyl.) Lücking, R.Miranda & Kalb (2011)

Species
- T. hierrense T. lumbricoides T. stictideum

Genus of lichens

Trinathotrema is a genus of lichen-forming fungi in the family Stictidaceae. It has three species. The genus was circumscribed in 2011 by Robert Lücking, Eimy Rivas Plata, and Armin Mangold, with Trinathotrema stictideum assigned as the type species. The genus name is an imperfect anagram in honour of American lichenologist Thomas Nash III, combining the letters -tho, -na, and -tri. Although most members of the Stictidaceae have chlorococcoid green algae as their photobiont partner, Trinathotrema associates with a trentepohlioid photobiont.

== Species ==
- Trinathotrema hierrense Ertz & van den Boom (2012)
- Trinathotrema lumbricoides (Sipman) Sipman & Aptroot (2011)
- Trinathotrema stictideum (Nyl.) Lücking, R.Miranda & Kalb (2011)
