= Odontotremataceae =

Scientific classification
- Kingdom: Fungi
- Division: Ascomycota
- Class: Lecanoromycetes
- Order: Odontotrematales; Lücking (2019)
- Family: Odontotremataceae; D.Hawksw. & Sherwood (1982)

Type genus
- Odontotrema Nyl. (1858)

Family of fungi

The Odontotremataceae are a family of fungi in the monotaxonomic order Odontotrematales. Species of this family have a widespread distribution, but are especially prevalent from northern temperate areas.

== Taxonomy ==
The family Odontotremataceae is classified within the order Odontotrematales. This order is monotaxonomic, meaning it contains only one family. The order Odontotrematales was proposed by Robert Lücking as a new order, with Odontotremataceae as its sole family. Members of this order are primarily saprotrophic fungi found on wood, though some are rarely parasitic. Their ascomata (fruiting bodies) are rounded and range from immersed-erumpent to sessile, with a chroodiscoid to biatorine form, and are often carbonised. The excipulum is proso- to paraplectenchymatous, typically featuring distinct periphysoids. The hymenium jelly turns blue when exposed to iodine. These fungi have unbranched paraphyses and cylindrical asci. The asci possess an apically thickened tholus that is either iodine-negative (I-) or weakly iodine-positive (I+ bluish), with a small and narrow ocular chamber. The ascospores vary in shape from oblong-ellipsoid to cylindrical or fusiform-subsigmoid.

The order Odontotrematales is distinguished from related orders based on both phylogenetic and morphological evidence. Phylogenetic analyses have shown that Odontotremataceae does not form a clade with Ostropales (in the strict sense), but instead falls outside or is sister to the Graphidales-Gyalectales clade. Its recognition at the ordinal level is primarily due to its topological position in phylogenetic trees, rather than the temporal banding approach. Odontotrematales are non-lichenised, which sets them apart from the lichenised Thelenellales and Gyalectales, as well as the predominantly lichenised Graphidales. They also differ from Ostropales in the strict sense, which are largely non-lichenised or facultatively lichenised and typically have erumpent ascomata.

== Genera ==
- Claviradulomyces P.R.Johnst., D.C.Park, H.C.Evans, R.W.Barreto & D.J.Soares (2010) – 7 spp.
- Coccomycetella Höhn. (1917) – 2 spp.
- Odontotrema Nyl. (1858) – 2 spp.
- Odontura Clem. (1909) – 1 sp.
- Parakarstenia C.L.Yang, H.O.Baral & X.L.Xu (2019) – 1 sp.
- Paralethariicola Calat., Etayo & Diederich (2001) – 1 sp.
- Potriphila Döbbeler (1996) – 3 spp.
- Rogellia Döbbeler (1999) – 2 spp.
- Sphaeropezia Sacc. (1884) – 22 spp.
- Stromatothecia D.E.Shaw & D.Hawksw. (1971) – 1 spp.
- Tryblis Clem. (1931) – 2 spp.
- Xerotrema Sherwood & Coppins (1980) – 2 spp.
