= Spirographa =

Scientific classification
- Kingdom: Fungi
- Division: Ascomycota
- Class: Lecanoromycetes
- Order: Ostropales
- Family: Spirographaceae; Flakus, Etayo & Miadlikowska (2019)
- Genus: Spirographa; Zahlbr. (1903)

Type species
- Spirographa spiralis (Müll.Arg.) Zahlbr. (1923)

Genus of fungi

Spirographa is a genus of parasitic fungi. It is the sole genus in the monotypic family Spirographaceae, belonging to the order Ostropales. These obligate parasites live exclusively on lichens and produce distinctive fruiting bodies that develop within their host's tissue, characterised by ascospores arranged in a loose spiral pattern. The genus is distinguished by its unique spore features, including some species that produce spores with long, thread-like appendages, and unusual Y-shaped or geometric asexual reproductive structures.

== Taxonomy ==
The genus was circumscribed by Alexander Zahlbruckner in 1903, with Spirographa spiralis later assigned as the type species in 1923. The family Spirographaceae was circumscribed by Adam Flakus, Javier Etayo and Jolanta Miadlikowska in 2019 on the basis of molecular phylogenetics analysis. They determined that genus Spirographa is an independent lineage in the Ostropales, sister to the clade containing the families Gomphillaceae and Graphidaceae.

== Description ==
Spirographa species are obligate parasites of lichens and therefore form no independent thallus of their own. Their fruiting bodies develop within the host tissue as either small apothecia or perithecia. When young these structures lie completely immersed; at maturity they may remain flush with the surface or protrude slightly. The exposed disc is shallowly concave and ranges from orange-brown to almost black; it never turns blue in iodine stains. A yellow-brown to black exciple of isodiametric or elongate cells surrounds the disc and lacks any external hairs. The surface layer (epithecium) carries a granular pigment that helps to distinguish the genus.

The hymenium (the fertile, spore-bearing surface) contains numerous paraphyses—mostly unbranched threads that thicken at their colourless tips. Between them stand club-shaped (clavate) to cylindrical asci that are not fissitunicate, have thin lateral walls, lack any iodine reaction, and typically contain 16 or 32 ascospores. The spores are packed in a loose spiral, narrowly ellipsoidal to spindle-shaped with rounded or pointed ends; some species produce markedly ciliate spores featuring long, thread-like appendages at each pole. All spores have a single septum, are colourless, smooth-walled and have no surrounding perispore.

Asexual reproduction in Spirographa occurs in immersed, spherical to pear-shaped pycnidia. When mature the upper wall of the pycnidium breaks down irregularly to release conidia. These colourless propagules lack septa, truncate at the base and vary in shape: some resemble a "Y", with a central axis and two diverging arms, while others are triangular, tetrahedral or polyhedral. Thin-layer chromatography has not detected any secondary metabolites (lichen substances) in the genus.

== Species ==
As of July 2025, Species Fungorum (in the Catalogue of Life) accept 24 species of Spirographa:

- Spirographa aggregata Flakus, Etayo & Miądl. (2019)
- Spirographa arsenii (Vouaux) Flakus, Etayo & Miądl. (2019)
- Spirographa ascaridiella (Nyl.) Flakus, Etayo & Miądl. (2019)
- Spirographa ciliata (Kalb) Flakus, Etayo & Miądl. (2019)
- Spirographa fusisporella (Nyl.) Zahlbr. (1903)
- Spirographa galligena Flakus, Etayo & Miądl. (2019)
- Spirographa giselae (Brackel) Flakus, Etayo & Miądl. (2019)
- Spirographa herteliana (Knoph) Flakus, Etayo & Miądl. (2019)
- Spirographa hypotrachynae (Etayo) Flakus, Etayo & Miądl. (2019)
- Spirographa intermedia (Punith. & D.Hawksw.) Flakus, Etayo & Miądl. (2019)
- Spirographa lichenicola (D.Hawksw. & B.Sutton) Flakus, Etayo & Miądl. (2019)
- Spirographa limaciformis (Piroz.) Flakus, Etayo & Miądl. (2019)
- Spirographa longispora Etayo (2017)
- Spirographa maroneae Flakus, Etayo & Miądl. (2019)
- Spirographa ophiurospora (Etayo) Flakus, Etayo & Miądl. (2019)
- Spirographa parmotrematis Flakus, Etayo & Miądl. (2019)
- Spirographa pittii (D.Hawksw. & Punith.) Flakus, Etayo & Miądl. (2019)
- Spirographa pyramidalis (Etayo) Flakus, Etayo & Miądl. (2019)
- Spirographa spiralis (Müll.Arg.) Zahlbr. (1923)
- Spirographa triangularis (Diederich & Etayo) Flakus, Etayo & Miądl. (2019)
- Spirographa tricupulata (F.Berger & E.Zimmerm.) Flakus, Etayo & Miądl. (2019)
- Spirographa usneae Flakus, Kukwa & Etayo (2012)
- Spirographa vermiformis (Leight.) Flakus, Etayo & Miądl. (2019)
- Spirographa vinosa Holien & Triebel (1996)
