= Lillicoa =

Scientific classification
- Domain: Eukaryota
- Kingdom: Fungi
- Division: Ascomycota
- Class: Lecanoromycetes
- Order: Ostropales
- Family: Stictidaceae
- Genus: Lillicoa; Sherwood (1977)

Type species
- Lillicoa palicoureae (Seaver & Whetzel) Sherwood (1977)

Species
- L. bicolor L. palicoureae L. speciosa L. thaxteri

Genus of fungi

Lillicoa is a genus of fungi in the family Stictidaceae. It has four species. The genus was circumscribed by mycologist Martha Sherwood in 1977, with Lillicoa palicoureae assigned as the type species.

== Species ==
- Lillicoa bicolor (Pat.) Sherwood (1978)
- Lillicoa palicoureae (Seaver & Whetzel) Sherwood (1977)
- Lillicoa speciosa Sherwood (1978)
- Lillicoa thaxteri Sherwood (1978)
