= Conotremopsis =

Scientific classification
- Domain: Eukaryota
- Kingdom: Fungi
- Division: Ascomycota
- Class: Lecanoromycetes
- Order: Ostropales
- Family: Stictidaceae
- Genus: Conotremopsis; Vèzda (1977)

Type species
- Conotremopsis weberiana Vězda (1977)

Genus of fungi

Conotremopsis is a genus of fungi within the family Stictidaceae. This is a monotypic genus, containing only the single species Conotremopsis weberiana.
