= Paralethariicola =

Scientific classification
- Kingdom: Fungi
- Division: Ascomycota
- Class: Lecanoromycetes
- Order: Odontotrematales
- Family: Odontotremataceae
- Genus: Paralethariicola; Calatayud, Etayo & Diederich

Type species
- Paralethariicola aspiciliae Calat., Etayo & Diederich

Genus of fungi

Paralethariicola is a genus of fungi in the family Odontotremataceae. This is a monotypic genus, containing the single species Paralethariicola aspiciliae.
