= Carestiella =

Scientific classification
- Domain: Eukaryota
- Kingdom: Fungi
- Division: Ascomycota
- Class: Lecanoromycetes
- Order: Ostropales
- Family: Stictidaceae
- Genus: Carestiella; Bres. (1897)

Type species
- Carestiella socia Bres. (1897)

Genus of fungi

Carestiella is a genus of lichen-forming fungi in the family Stictidaceae. It contains two species: Carestiella socia and Carestiella schizoxyloides.
