= Karstenia =

Scientific classification
- Kingdom: Fungi
- Division: Ascomycota
- Class: Lecanoromycetes
- Order: Ostropales
- Family: Stictidaceae
- Genus: Karstenia; Fr. (1885)

Type species
- Karstenia sorbina (P.Karst.) P.Karst. (1885)

Synonyms
- Chailletia P.Karst. (1871)

Genus of fungi

Karstenia is a genus of fungi in the family Stictidaceae. These small fungi typically grow on wood and bark, producing tiny fruiting bodies that remain partially buried in their host material and appear as small pustules with pale pink or greyish-white centres. Unlike many related fungi, species of Karstenia do not form lichens, though they may occasionally grow near green algae.

== Description ==
Karstenia is a non‑lichenised genus; it forms no thallus of its own, although some species may occasionally grow in loose association with members of the green algal genus Trentepohlia. Its fruiting bodies are minute apothecia (fruiting bodies) that begin life buried in the host tissue. While still immersed they are flask‑shaped to lens‑like, raising the substrate into tiny pustules with a narrow pore at the top. As the apothecium enlarges, the outer wall (exciple) splits irregularly, producing a tooth‑like margin around a pale pink or grey‑white disc, but the structure never erupts completely through the surface.

The exciple is well developed and generally colourless to light brown, only rarely darkening; unlike many comparable fungi it contains few if any crystals. Internally, the outer cells are arranged in short vertical rows that extend beyond the rim as fine, hair‑like projections. The hymenium is packed with slender, thread‑like paraphyses that may or may not turn blue in an iodine–potassium iodide test (KI+ or KI–). Cylindrical, short‑stalked asci each contain eight ascospores; their walls are uniformly thin and lack any specialised apical apparatus, and they remain iodine‑negative.

The ascospores are colourless and thin‑walled, with either several transverse septa or, less commonly, a muriform arrangement of both transverse and longitudinal septa. No asexual reproductive structures (conidiomata) have been reported, and thin-layer chromatography has revealed no secondary metabolites (lichen products) in the genus.

== Ecology ==
Karstenia species usually inhabit wood and bark substrates. In rare instances, they are found growing on rock (saxicolous).

== Species ==
As of July 2025, Species Fungorum (in the Catalogue of Life) accept 14 species of Karstenia:

- Karstenia chrysophaea (Pers.) Coppins, Aptroot & P.F.Cannon (2024)
- Karstenia clematidis (W.Phillips) Sherwood (1980) – Great Britain
- Karstenia corticioides (Pat.) Sherwood (1977)
- Karstenia dictyospora (Coppins) Coppins, Aptroot & P.F.Cannon (2024)
- Karstenia gregaria Graddon (1986) – Great Britain
- Karstenia idaei (Fuckel) Sherwood (1977)
- Karstenia inconspicua Wilberf. (1999)
- Karstenia lonicerae (Velen.) Sherwood (1977)
- Karstenia macra (P.Karst.) Sherwood (1980)
- Karstenia maydis (Rehm) Sherwood (1980)
- Karstenia nigra (Coppins) Coppins, Aptroot & P.F.Cannon (2024)
- Karstenia rhopaloides (Sacc.) Baral (2015)
- Karstenia rubicola (Ellis & Dearn.) Sherwood (1980)
- Karstenia sorbina (P.Karst.) P.Karst. (1885)
