= Malvinia =

Scientific classification
- Kingdom: Fungi
- Division: Ascomycota
- Class: Lecanoromycetes
- Order: Ostropales
- Genus: Malvinia; Döbbeler (2003)
- Species: M. endoderma

Binomial name
- Malvinia endoderma Döbbeler (2003)

Single-species fungal genus

Malvinia is a fungal genus of uncertain familial placement in the order Ostropales. It comprises the single species Malvinia endoderma, a moss-parasitising fungus found in the Falkland Islands.

== Taxonomy ==
Malvinia was circumscribed by the mycologist Peter Döbbeler in 2003. It is classified within the order Ostropales and currently contains a single species, Malvinia endoderma. The type specimen of Malvinia endoderma was collected on 25 January 1968, by John Jay Engel in the Falkland Islands. Specifically, it was found on the east side of the summit ridge of Mount Adam in West Falklands, at an elevation between 2,200 and 2,297 ft (671 and 700 m).

The etymology of the genus name reflects its geographic origin. Malvinia is derived from Las Islas Malvinas, which is the Spanish name for the Falkland Islands where the type specimen was discovered. The specific epithet endoderma is a combination of two Greek words: endo, meaning 'within', and derma, meaning 'skin'. This name was chosen to describe the fungus's habit of forming its reproductive structures (ascomata) within the epidermis of its host plant.

Taxonomically, Malvinia endoderma shares some similarities with Rogellia nectrioidea, another species described by the same author. Both are monospecific genera within the Ostropales and develop their fruit-bodies endobiotically within the abaxial (lower) side of their host plants' leaves. However, Döbbeler determined that the differences between these two species in key characteristics – such as excipular structure, spore type, and iodine reaction – were significant enough to warrant their placement in separate genera. The genus is variously classified as incertae sedis (of uncertain placement) in the either the order Ostropales, or in the subclass Ostropomycetidae.

== Description ==
Malvinia is characterised by its unique reproductive structures and parasitic lifestyle. The genus produces apothecioid ascomata, which are small, disc-shaped fruiting bodies typically measuring 65–120 micrometres (μm) in diameter and up to 30 μm in height. These structures are roundish, uncoloured, and smooth, with an irregular or star-shaped opening. The excipulum, or outer layer of the ascomata, is greatly reduced, while the paraphyses are thread-like and approximately 1.5 μm wide.

The reproductive cells, or asci, are unitunicate (single-walled) and measure 22–26 by 6–7 μm. They are subcylindrical or narrowly ellipsoidal in shape and contain eight spores each. These asci do not react with iodine-based staining reagents, a characteristic used in fungal identification. The ascospores produced by the asci are ellipsoidal, single-celled, and uncoloured, measuring 6.5–8 by 2.5 μm. The fungal hyphae of Malvinia are extremely delicate, less than 0.5 μm wide, and colourless, growing within the cell walls of the host plant.

Malvinia is parasitic, specifically infecting the lower, older leaves of the moss Dendroligotrichum squamosum. The fungus develops its reproductive structures within the abaxial (lower) epidermal cells of the host's leaves, causing the cell walls to split and form distinctive tooth-like flaps that cover the developing hymenium (spore-producing layer).
