= Stictophacidium =

Scientific classification
- Domain: Eukaryota
- Kingdom: Fungi
- Division: Ascomycota
- Class: Lecanoromycetes
- Order: Ostropales
- Family: Stictidaceae
- Genus: Stictophacidium; Rehm

Type species
- Stictophacidium carniolicum Rehm

Genus of fungi

Stictophacidium is a genus of lichenized fungi in the family Stictidaceae.
