= Topelia =

Scientific classification
- Domain: Eukaryota
- Kingdom: Fungi
- Division: Ascomycota
- Class: Lecanoromycetes
- Order: Ostropales
- Family: Stictidaceae
- Genus: Topelia; P.M. Jørg. & Vèzda

Type species
- Topelia rosea (Servít) P.M. Jørg. & Vězda

Genus of fungi

Topelia is a genus of fungi within the family Stictidaceae.

The genus name of Topelia is an anagram in honour of Josef Poelt (1924-1995), who was a German-Austrian botanist (Bryology, Mycology and Lichenology) and was Professor of Systematic Botany at the Free University of Berlin in 1965.

The genus was circumscribed by Per Magnus Jørgensen and Antonin Vězda in Nova Hedwigia Beih. vol.79 on page 502 in 1984.

== Species ==
As accepted by Species Fungorum;

- Topelia aperiens P.M. Jørg. & Vězda (1984)
- Topelia argentinensis Aptroot, L.I. Ferraro & M. Cáceres (2015)
- Topelia brittonii (Riddle) H. Mayrhofer (1987)
- Topelia californica P.M. Jørg. & Vězda (1984)
- Topelia gyalectodes (Nyl.) B.D. Ryan & Lumbsch (2007)
- Topelia heterospora (Zahlbr.) P.M. Jørg. & Vězda (1984)
- Topelia jasonhurii Lőkös, Farkas & S.Y. Kondr. (2013)
- Topelia loekoesiana S.Y. Kondr., J.-J. Woo & Hur (2018)
- Topelia nimisiana Tretiach & Vězda (1992)
- Topelia rosea (Servít) P.M. Jørg. & Vězda (1984)
- Topelia tetraspora Aptroot & M. Cáceres (2015)
