= Rogellia =

Scientific classification
- Kingdom: Fungi
- Division: Ascomycota
- Class: Lecanoromycetes
- Order: Odontotrematales
- Family: Odontotremataceae
- Genus: Rogellia; Döbb.

Type species
- Rogellia nectrioidea Döbb.

Genus of fungi

Rogellia is a genus of fungi in the family Odontotremataceae.
