= Tryblis =

Scientific classification
- Domain: Eukaryota
- Kingdom: Fungi
- Division: Ascomycota
- Class: Lecanoromycetes
- Order: Odontotrematales
- Family: Odontotremataceae
- Genus: Tryblis; Clem. (1931)

Type species
- Tryblis arnoldii (Rehm) Clem. (1931)

Species
- T. arnoldii T. signata

Genus of lichen

Tryblis is a genus of fungi in the family Odontotremataceae. It has two species. The genus was circumscribed in 1931 by Frederic Clements, with T. arnoldii assigned as the type species; this was originally described as Blitridium arnoldii by Heinrich Rehm in 1872. Tryblis signata was added to the genus in 1997 by Martin Magnes.
