= Georg Lettau =

German lichenologist

Georg Lettau (1878–1951) was a German ophthalmologist and lichenologist who made contributions to the study of lichens in Central Europe. Born in Weißenfels, he initially pursued natural sciences before switching to medicine, maintaining his botanical interests throughout his career. Despite the professional and financial challenges that frequently interrupted his scientific work, particularly during the post-World War I inflation period, Lettau amassed an extensive lichen collection and published numerous works on Central European lichens. His most significant contribution was a comprehensive 14-volume work on the lichen funga of Central Europe, and he identified several new lichen species. Lettau's scientific legacy is preserved in the Botanical Museum Berlin-Dahlem, and his influence on lichenology is commemorated through several fungal taxa named in his honour.

== Early life and education ==
Born in 1878 in Weißenfels/Saale in the Prussian province of Saxony (now part of Sachsen-Anhalt), Lettau showed an early interest in natural sciences. After completing his gymnasium education in Königsberg (East Prussia, now Kaliningrad) in 1896, he began studying natural sciences at the age of 18, focusing primarily on botany and zoology. He studied for two semesters in Halle, three in Freiburg (under Friedrich Oltmanns and August Weismann), one in Königsberg, and two in Leipzig (under Pfeffer), which provided him with a solid foundation in scientific knowledge.

As early as 1899, Lettau began collecting lichens during excursions around Königsberg, and attempted to identify his findings using Sydow's Flechten Deutschlands and other books.

At Easter 1900, Lettau abandoned his planned career as a botanical lecturer due to poor prospects and instead pursued medical studies, with the intention of continuing his botanical studies in his free time and focusing primarily on lichen research. After three semesters and completing his first medical examination, he returned to Freiburg and then went to Munich in 1901, hoping to study lichenology under Ferdinand Christian Gustav Arnold, only to discover that Arnold had recently died.

In Munich, Lettau met Gustav Schnabl, who had accompanied Arnold on his excursions and became Lettau's first lichenological mentor. Lettau conducted several excursions with Schnabl to study lichens.

== Medical career and lichenological research ==
In 1903/4, Lettau passed his state medical examination in Heidelberg. He was clearly more interested in botany than in medicine, but as a physician he had a secure income. Furthermore, his chosen narrow field of ophthalmology within medicine allowed him enough time for botanical studies. In April 1904, he briefly worked at a military hospital and Lake Como, as well as in Baden-Baden. From 1904 to 1906, he served as an assistant physician in Dresden. In April 1905, he collected lichens at Lake Garda, in Bolzano and Merano, and in summer 1905 around Dresden and in Saxon Switzerland.

From 1906 to 1910, Lettau established his first ophthalmological practice in Arnstadt (Thuringia). During this period, his lichenological work received a major boost when he acquired the large lichen collection of the lichenologist Friedrich Ludwig from Greiz, which he integrated with his own collection. However, his collecting activities were hindered by his professional work, which consumed most of his time. Despite this, he had to maintain an unavoidable Sunday practice hour, further limiting his available time. As a result, he could never undertake a multi-day excursion in the Thuringian Forest or surrounding areas during these four years, except during one holiday period in Tambach.

During this time, he received exsiccatae (dried herbarium specimens) from Julien Harmand and Max Britzelmayr, and his collection was enriched with specimens from Arnold, Philipp Franz Wilhelm von Zwackh-Holzhausen, Rabenhorst, Hugó Lojka, and others. In the fall of 1907, Lettau collected during a trip through Montafon in Vorarlberg, St Anton in West Tyrol, and in the Sonnwend mountain group in North Tyrol; in July 1908, he collected again at Bludenz in Vorarlberg and at Hohentwiel; in June 1909, he collected on the Samland coast in East Prussia. In October 1909, he spent time in Vienna, where he worked under the guidance of Alexander Zahlbruckner and Julius Steiner at the Natural History Museum and Botanical Institute.

Lettau was forced to take on additional employment beyond his ophthalmology practice to support his scientific work. Between 1908 and 1931, he meticulously compiled his own herbarium, which was later preserved in the Botanical Museum Berlin-Dahlem (B).

In April 1910, Lettau exchanged his ophthalmological practice in Arnstadt for one in Lörrach (Baden), hoping to dedicate more time to lichens. This allowed him several years of intensive collecting and research. He explored the surroundings of Lörrach and Basel, the neighbouring Black Forest, the Swiss Jura, and the southernmost Alsace through numerous larger and smaller excursions. In August 1912, he undertook a collecting trip to various regions of Switzerland; in June–July 1913, he visited St Anton in West Tyrol, the Engadin, and the Swiss National Park Val Cluozza.

He collected extensively throughout Austria, particularly in Vorarlberg (1907), Kärnten (1907), Merano in South Tyrol (1908), and in Tyrol (1907), specifically at St Anton am Arlberg and the Sonnwend mountain group. In 1913, he spent several days in Vienna with Zahlbruckner and Steiner.

== World War I and the interwar period ==
During World War I, Lettau's collecting activities were limited by military service and reduced free time, though he managed to collect some specimens around Lörrach (Switzerland and Alsace were mostly "closed"). In August 1915, he collected in the Thuringian Forest; in August–September 1917, he returned to Switzerland; and in June–July 1918, he collected in the Allgäu. After the war, he was able to publish some results from his earlier collecting trips in Switzerland, as well as contributions to the lichen flora of Thuringia and East Prussia.

In 1919, Lettau began organizing the lichen collections at the botanical institute in Basel, particularly the extensive Schaffer-Basel collection of lichens, which primarily originated from the vicinity of Basel. During August–September, he collected numerous lichens during a vacation stay in Grindelwald and Mürren (Berner Oberland). In the following years, he had frequent exchanges with well-known lichenologists including Tobler, Frey, Erichsen, Sandstede, Magnusson, Du Rietz, and Hillmann.

In 1923, Lettau faced financial catastrophe due to the inflation that devalued all monetary assets. With completely inadequate income from his medical practice, despite its constant increase, he was forced to earn more money to support his family. In April 1923, he took on additional accounting work for the medical association. These additional professional duties left little time for other activities, and he had to give up his work on Rabenhorst's lichens and all botanical activities completely. Despite the efforts of his lichenological friends both domestic and foreign to alleviate this situation through stipends and other support, all attempts failed as the support for his family could not be achieved through these means. The learned professional and accounting work could not be abandoned. This period marked a forced complete withdrawal from science. Lichens were no longer collected, as maintaining a collection had no purpose, and all connections with colleagues worldwide had to be severed. Only occasionally could he work on the continuation of his lichen herbarium in Basel.

== Later career and major works ==
Only in 1931 was Lettau able (and required, due to relocation) to give up his medical accounting position. He immediately began publishing the results of his research from 1920 to 1923 (the beginning of his work on Rabenhorst). The first part was published in 1932 as "Monographic Treatment of Some Lichen Families". After several more years of complete interruption due to personal reasons, he was able to resume his literary activities in 1936. In 1937, the conclusion of this publication appeared.

In winter 1936/37, Lettau finally managed to reorganize his collection, which had gone unused for 14 years, and in summer 1937, he resumed microscopic work as much as his limited time alongside his professional activities allowed. In August 1937, he made an exception and collected a number of lichens in the border area of eastern Samland.

== Scientific work ==
Lettau's research resulted in a comprehensive work on the lichen funga of Central Europe, documented in a 14-volume compilation (totalling 905 pages). This work was considered highly significant for understanding the distribution of Central European lichens. It treats 1965 species, providing detailed information on morphological and anatomical characters, thallus reactions, ecological preferences, and distributions.

His major publications include a monographic treatment of several lichen families published in 1937 and a series of works on Central European lichens published between 1939 and 1958. The work "Flechten aus Mitteleuropa" (Lichens from Central Europe), which began with its first publication in February 1939, was his final major contribution to lichenology. Many of these works were published in Feddes Repertorium Specierum Novarum Regni Vegetabilis and its subsequent iterations. Later volumes of his work were edited by Vitus Grummann.

== Eponymy ==
Several fungal taxa were named in honour of Lettau:

- Lettauia D.Hawksw. & R.Sant. (1990)
- Didymella lettauiana Keissl.
- Melanogramma lettauiana Vouaux
- Pyrenopeziza lettaui Grummann
- Sporodictyon lettauianum Bachm.
- Verrucaria lettaii Servít
