= Coccomycetella =

Scientific classification
- Kingdom: Fungi
- Division: Ascomycota
- Class: Lecanoromycetes
- Order: Odontotrematales
- Family: Odontotremataceae
- Genus: Coccomycetella; Höhn.

Type species
- Coccomycetella belonospora (Nyl.) Höhn.

Genus of fungi

Coccomycetella is a genus of fungi in the family Odontotremataceae.
