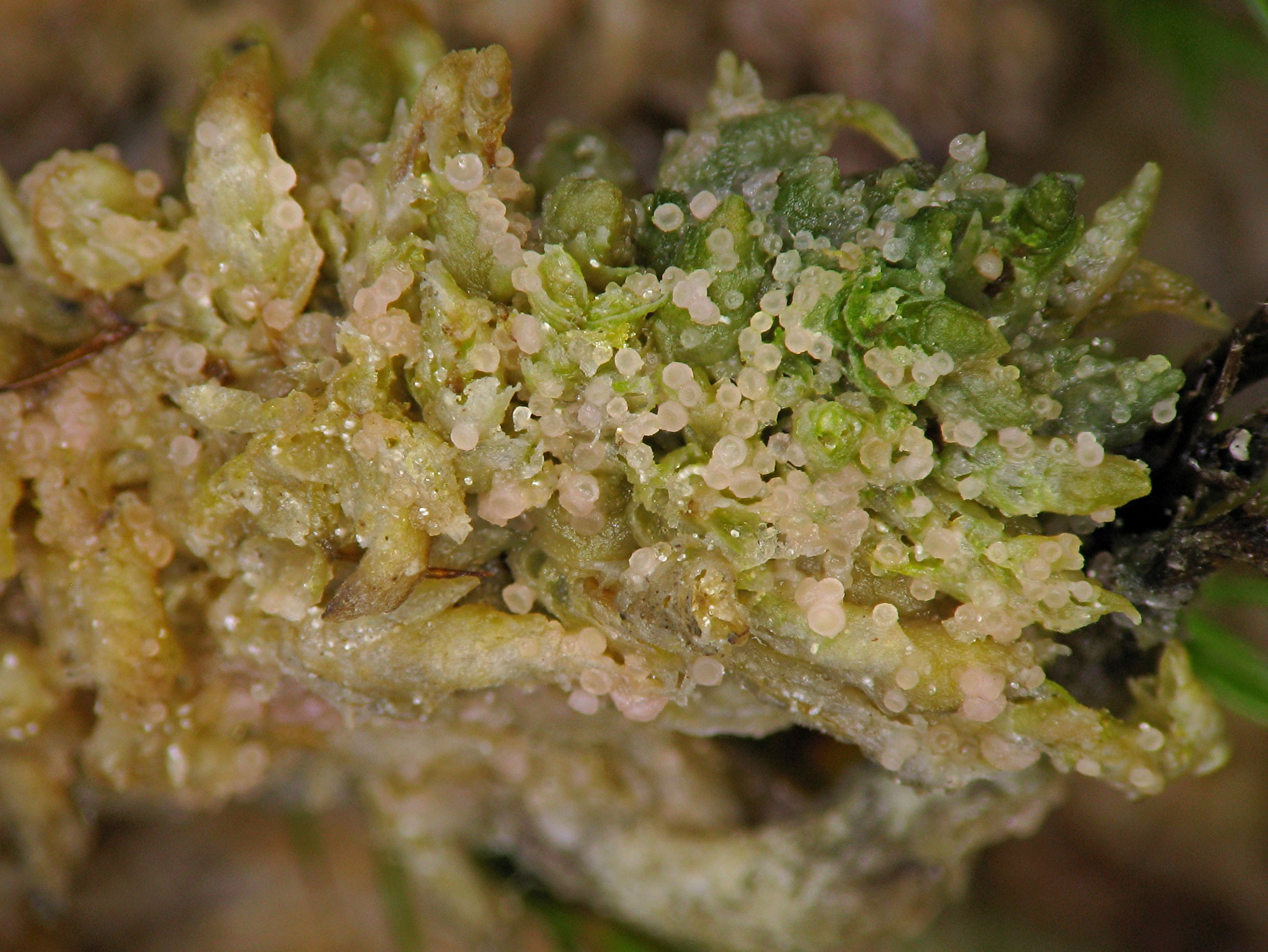
- Absconditella sphagnorum

Scientific classification
- Domain: Eukaryota
- Kingdom: Fungi
- Division: Ascomycota
- Class: Lecanoromycetes
- Order: Ostropales
- Family: Stictidaceae
- Genus: Absconditella; Vèzda (1965)

Type species
- Absconditella sphagnorum Vězda & Poelt (1965)

Species
- See text

Synonyms
- Geisleria Nitschke (1861)

= Absconditella =

Genus of lichen-forming fungi

Absconditella is a genus of lichen-forming fungi in the family Stictidaceae. These lichens are characterised by their inconspicuous growth and small, cup-shaped fruiting bodies (apothecia) that are often hidden within a jelly-like mass containing green algae. The genus name, meaning "hidden", reflects their elusive nature. Absconditella species are typically found on short-lived surfaces such as decaying wood, mosses, and unstable soil. Genetic studies have revealed that the genus is more complex than previously thought, with some species being moved to a new genus, Absconditonia, and others potentially representing groups of closely related species. Despite their small size and easily overlooked nature, environmental DNA studies suggest that Absconditella lichens may be more widespread than collections indicate.

== Taxonomy ==
The genus was circumscribed in 1965 by Czech lichenologist Antonín Vězda, with Absconditella sphagnorum assigned as the type species. Absconditella is characterised by gyalectoid apothecia with a hymenium that is not amyloid, without a dark pigment and thalli containing green algae as photobionts. The genus name means "hidden", a reference to the scant structure of the thallus and its small apothecia.

Molecular phylogenetics studies have shown that Absconditella is polyphyletic within Stictidaceae. The genus Geisleria has been found to be nested within Absconditella, leading to the transfer of Geisleria sychnogonioides to Absconditella. Additionally, a new genus, Absconditonia, has been circumscribed to accommodate some species previously placed in Absconditella.

The conservation of the name Absconditella against Geisleria has been proposed to maintain nomenclatural stability.

== Characteristics ==
Absconditella species typically have minute, urceolate (deeply cup-shaped) ascomata (fruiting bodies) that are often sunken into a gel-like thallus. The excipulum can be either composed of parallel conglutinated hyphae or cellular. Paraphyses are simple and indistinctly septate, occasionally branched only in the upper part. Ascospores vary in shape and septation among species.

== Habitat and distribution ==
Species of Absconditella are often found on ephemeral substrates such as decaying wood, bryophytes, and unstable soil. Environmental DNA studies suggest that both Absconditella and Absconditonia may be more widespread than previously thought based on collected specimens alone.

== Species ==
As of August 2024, Species Fungorum (in the Catalogue of Life) accepts 13 species of Absconditella, although more species than this have been proposed for inclusion.

- Absconditella amabilis T.Sprib. (2009) – Canada
- Absconditella annexa (Arnold) Vězda (1965)
- Absconditella antarctica Søchting & Vězda (2004) – Antarctica
- Absconditella baegasanensis Lőkös, S.Y.Kondr. & Hur (2013)
- Absconditella celata Döbbeler & Poelt (1977) – Lappland
- Absconditella delutula (Nyl.) Coppins & H.Kilias (1980)
- Absconditella duplicella (Nyl.) Rossman (1979)
- Absconditella fossarum Vězda & Pišút (1985)
- Absconditella lignicola Vězda & Pišút (1985)
- Absconditella pauxilla Vězda & Vivant (1975)
- Absconditella rosea Kalb & Aptroot (2018) – South America
- Absconditella sphagnorum Vězda & Poelt (1965)
- Absconditella sychnogonioides (Nitschke) Suija & van den Boom (2023)
- Absconditella termitariicola Aptroot & M.Cáceres (2016) – Brazil
- Absconditella trivialis (Willey ex Tuck.) Vězda (1965)
- Absconditella viridithallina Kalb & Aptroot (2018) – South America

Research suggests that A. sphagnorum may represent a complex of multiple species.
