= Stromatothecia =

Scientific classification
- Kingdom: Fungi
- Division: Ascomycota
- Class: Lecanoromycetes
- Order: Odontotrematales
- Family: Odontotremataceae
- Genus: Stromatothecia; D.E.Shaw & D.Hawksw.

Type species
- Stromatothecia nothofagi D.E.Shaw & D.Hawksw.

Genus of fungi

Stromatothecia is a genus of fungi in the family Odontotremataceae. This is a monotypic genus, containing the single species Stromatothecia nothofagi.
