= Schizoxylon =

Scientific classification
- Domain: Eukaryota
- Kingdom: Fungi
- Division: Ascomycota
- Class: Lecanoromycetes
- Order: Ostropales
- Family: Stictidaceae
- Genus: Schizoxylon; Pers.

Type species
- Schizoxylon sepincola Pers.

Genus of fungi

Schizoxylon is a genus of fungi within the family Stictidaceae.
