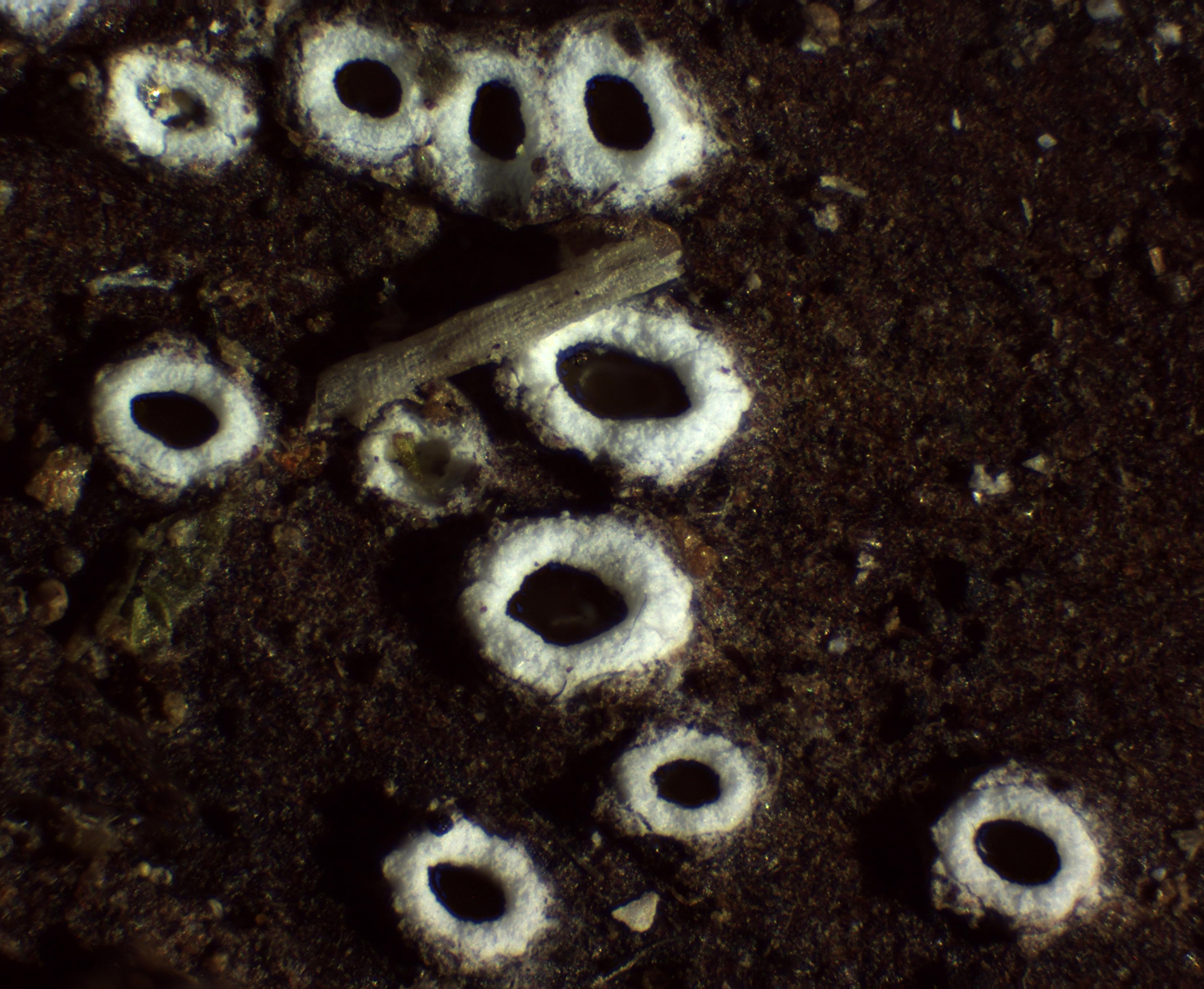
- Stictis radiata

Scientific classification
- Kingdom: Fungi
- Division: Ascomycota
- Class: Lecanoromycetes
- Order: Ostropales
- Family: Stictidaceae
- Genus: Stictis; Pers. (1800)

Type species
- Stictis radiata (L.) Pers. (1800)

Synonyms
- Conotrema Tuck. (1848); Conotrematomyces Cif. & Tomas. (1953); Cylindrina Pat. (1886); Lichenopsis Schwein. (1832); Phacobolus Fr. (1849); Platysticta Cooke (1889); Schmitzomia Fr. (1849); Stictis sect. Cyclostoma (P.Crouan & H.Crouan) Sherwood (1977); Stictis sect. Stictis Pers. (1800)

= Stictis =

Genus of lichen-forming fungi

Stictis is a genus of fungi in the family Stictidaceae. Most species are saprotrophic decomposers that inhabit dead wood, where they form small, flask-shaped fruiting bodies that remain largely embedded within their substrate and open through tiny pores. The genus is characterised by its distinctive white, frost-like rim that surrounds the fruiting bodies and thread-like ascospores divided by multiple cross-walls. Modern molecular phylogenetics studies suggest that the current broad concept of Stictis will likely be split into several separate genera as the group undergoes taxonomic revision.

== Taxonomy ==
The genus Stictis was circumscribed in 1800 by the mycologist Christiaan Hendrik Persoon. In his original description, Persoon characterised the genus as having receptacles that were subcupuliform (somewhat cup-shaped) or obliterated and immersed in wood. He established two species: S. radiata, described as immersed with a prominent white opening that was either entire or split in a radiating fashion, resembling certain Lycoperdon and Sphaerobolus species and characterised by a white, scalloped disc with brownish margin; and S. pallida, distinguished by its pustule-like form with a pale opening that gaped elliptically. Persoon noted that these simple fungi consisted only of a fructifying disc enclosed in wood, with form and substance resembling Peziza species, though lacking a distinctly prominent margin—instead, the wood formed a nest-like structure with a shining, round opening that sometimes displayed the elliptical gaping characteristic of Hysterium species. This circumscription established Stictis as a genus of wood-inhabiting fungi with distinctive cup-shaped or slit-like fruiting bodies that remain largely embedded within their substrate.

A molecular study of the Stictis–Conotrema complex in northern Scandinavia found that three phylogenetic species included both lichenized specimens traditionally placed in Conotrema and saprotrophic specimens identified as Stictis. The two forms did not resolve as separate species in analyses of multiple genetic markers, but instead represented different expressions of the same fungal species. Wedin, Döring, and Gilenstam interpreted this as evidence of "optional lichenization", in which individuals of the same species can complete their life cycle either as a lichen on bark or as a saprotroph on bark-free wood, depending on substrate. They consequently argued that these fungi should ultimately be treated in Stictis, the older generic name, rather than in Conotrema.

Later work has shown that Persoon's broad concept of Stictis will probably not survive modern scrutiny. Molecular and detailed morphological studies have demonstrated that many of the characters once used to separate genera in the Stictidaceae—particularly the presence or absence of tiny filaments (periphysoids) lining the fruiting body opening—vary within Stictis itself and therefore provide little guidance for drawing generic boundaries. Because the genus is large, taxonomically neglected, and most species are short-lived saprobes in the tropics, recent authors predict that the present, very broad concept of Stictis will eventually be broken up, as several independent lineages now grouped under the name are likely to be recognised as separate genera during a thorough revision of the family.

== Description ==
Most Stictis species are wholly saprotrophic and form no visible thallus; where a thallus is present it appears as a thin, whitish crust associated with scattered coccoid algae. The sexual fruiting bodies develop as flask- to lens-shaped apothecia that begin immersed in the substrate. They open through a minute pore and may later push up or split the surface, producing margins that range from smooth to ragged. A hallmark of the genus is the prominent, white, frost-like (pruinose) rim that surrounds many mature apothecia. The exposed disc remains moderately to deeply sunken and can be white, flesh-coloured, yellow-brown or nearly black; some species also carry a light dusting of pruina.

The apothecial wall (exciple) is typically three-layered and built from interwoven, narrow hyphae; it may include a false thalline margin formed from compressed host tissue invaded by fungal hyphae. In a few species this tissue becomes gelatinous when moist. Just beneath the pore lies a crystalline layer from which filamentous periphysoids arise; these hair-like elements may be simple or sparsely branched. The hymenium itself is packed with numerous thread-like paraphyses that can branch or swell at the tips and are often embedded in an iodine-positive (I⁺ blue) gel matrix.

Asci are cylindrical, functionally unitunicate and contain four or eight ascospores. They possess a conspicuous, non-refractive apical cap pierced by an iodine-negative pore. The spores are typically long-cylindrical to thread-like, colourless, and divided by many transverse septa; some species develop a faint gelatinous sheath around each spore. No asexual fruit bodies are known, and thin-layer chromatography has yet to reveal any distinctive secondary metabolites in the genus.

== Species ==
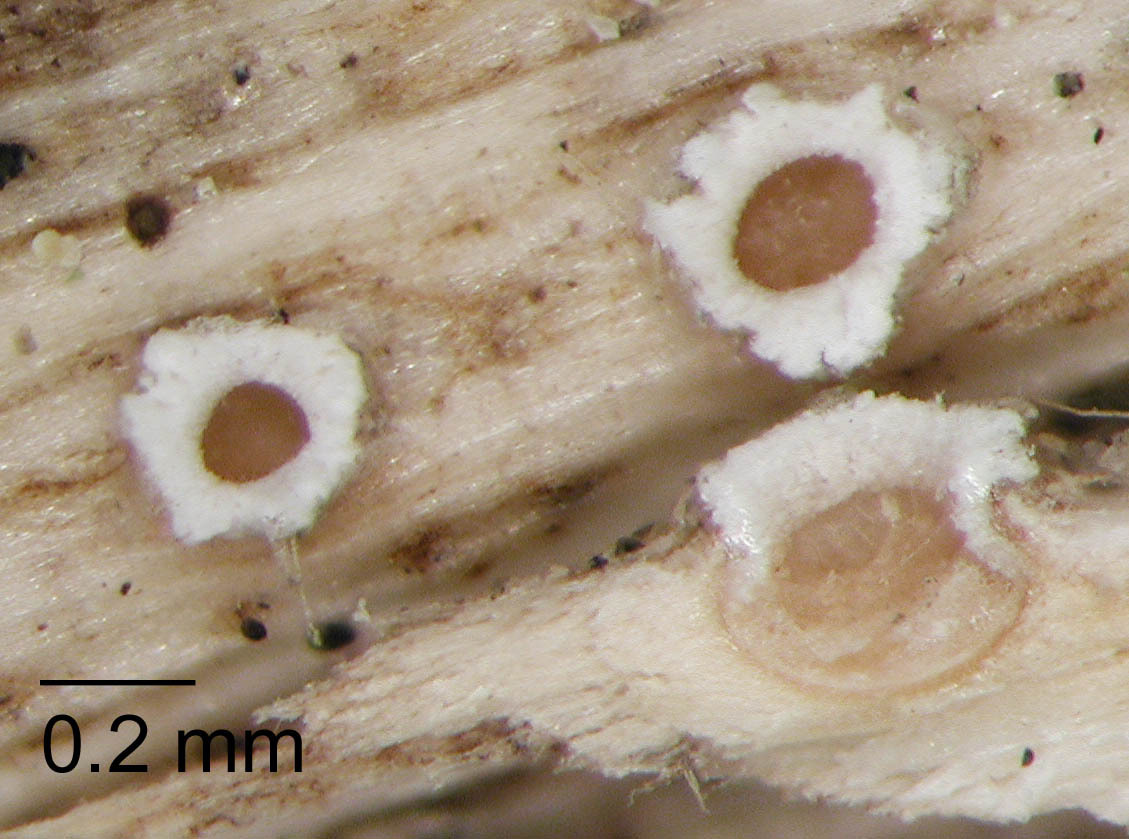
Stictis cordylines

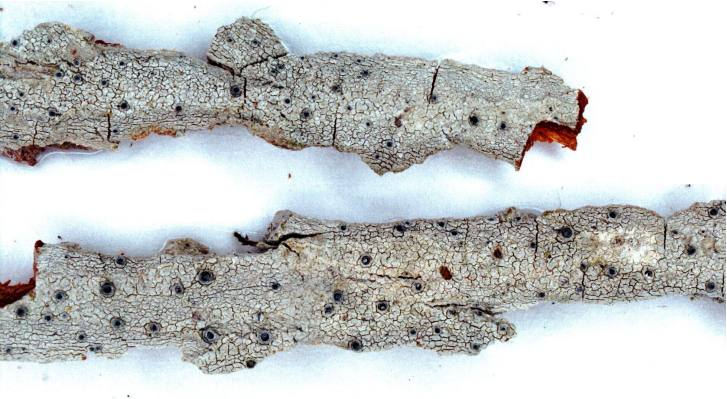
Stictis urceolatum

As of July 2025, Species Fungorum accepts 44 species of Stictis:

- Stictis anhuiensis Z.J.Li & C.L.Hou (2016) – China
- Stictis anomianthi N.I.de Silva, Lumyong & K.D.Hyde (2023)
- Stictis arundinacea Pers. (1822)
- Stictis asteliae P.R.Johnst. (1983)
- Stictis brunnescens Gilenstam, H.Döring & Wedin (2006)
- Stictis carnea Seaver & Waterston (1941)
- Stictis chrysopsis Ellis & Everh. (1894)
- Stictis clavata P.R.Johnst. (1983)
- Stictis collospermi P.R.Johnst. (1983)
- Stictis confusa Gilenstam, H.Döring & Wedin (2006)
- Stictis cordylines P.R.Johnst. (1983)
- Stictis dealbata P.R.Johnst. (1983)
- Stictis dicksoniae Sherwood (1977)
- Stictis dumontii Sherwood (1977)
- Stictis ecclesiensis Joanne E.Taylor, K.D.Hyde & E.B.G.Jones (2003)
- Stictis elevata (P.Karst.) P.Karst. (1885)
- Stictis elongatispora Graddon (1977)
- Stictis friabilis (W.Phillips & Plowr.) Sacc. & Traverso (1911)
- Stictis fuscella Sherwood (1977)
- Stictis graminicola Lasch (1858)
- Stictis graminum Desm. (1840)
- Stictis hawaiensis E.K.Cash (1938)
- Stictis himalayana (Nayaka & Upreti) S.Joshi & Upreti (2010)
- Stictis immersa (Pass. ex Sacc.) Sherwood (1977)
- Stictis inconstans P.R.Johnst. (1983)
- Stictis laciniata P.R.Johnst. (1983)
- Stictis lata P.R.Johnst. (1983)
- Stictis leucospermi Joanne E.Taylor, Crous & M.E.Palm (2001)
- Stictis mollis Pers. (1822)
- Stictis pachyspora (Rehm) Rehm (1888)
- Stictis palniensis S.Joshi & Upreti (2012)
- Stictis paucula P.R.Johnst. (1983)
- Stictis populorum (Gilenstam) Gilenstam (2005)
- Stictis prominens Sherwood (1977)
- Stictis radiata L.) Pers. (1800)
- Stictis serenoae E.K.Cash (1943)
- Stictis serpentaria Ellis & Everh. (1897)
- Stictis stellata Wallr. (1833)
- Stictis subbrachyspora S.Joshi & Upreti (2010)
- Stictis subiculata P.R.Johnst. (1983)
- Stictis tortilis P.R.Johnst. (1983)
- Stictis trinervia P.R.Johnst. (1983)
- Stictis urceolata (Ach.) Gilenstam (2005)
- Stictis virginea Cooke & W.Phillips (1879)
