= Potriphila =

Scientific classification
- Kingdom: Fungi
- Division: Ascomycota
- Class: Lecanoromycetes
- Order: Odontotrematales
- Family: Odontotremataceae
- Genus: Potriphila; Döbbeler

Type species
- Potriphila navicularis Döbbeler

Genus of fungi

Potriphila is a genus of fungi in the family Odontotremataceae.
