= Ostropa =

Scientific classification
- Kingdom: Fungi
- Division: Ascomycota
- Class: Lecanoromycetes
- Order: Ostropales
- Family: Stictidaceae
- Genus: Ostropa; Fr. (1825)

Type species
- Ostropa barbara (Fr.) Nannf. (1932)

Species of lichens

Ostropa is a lichen genus in the family Stictidaceae. It is a monotypic genus, consisting of the single species Ostropa barbara.
