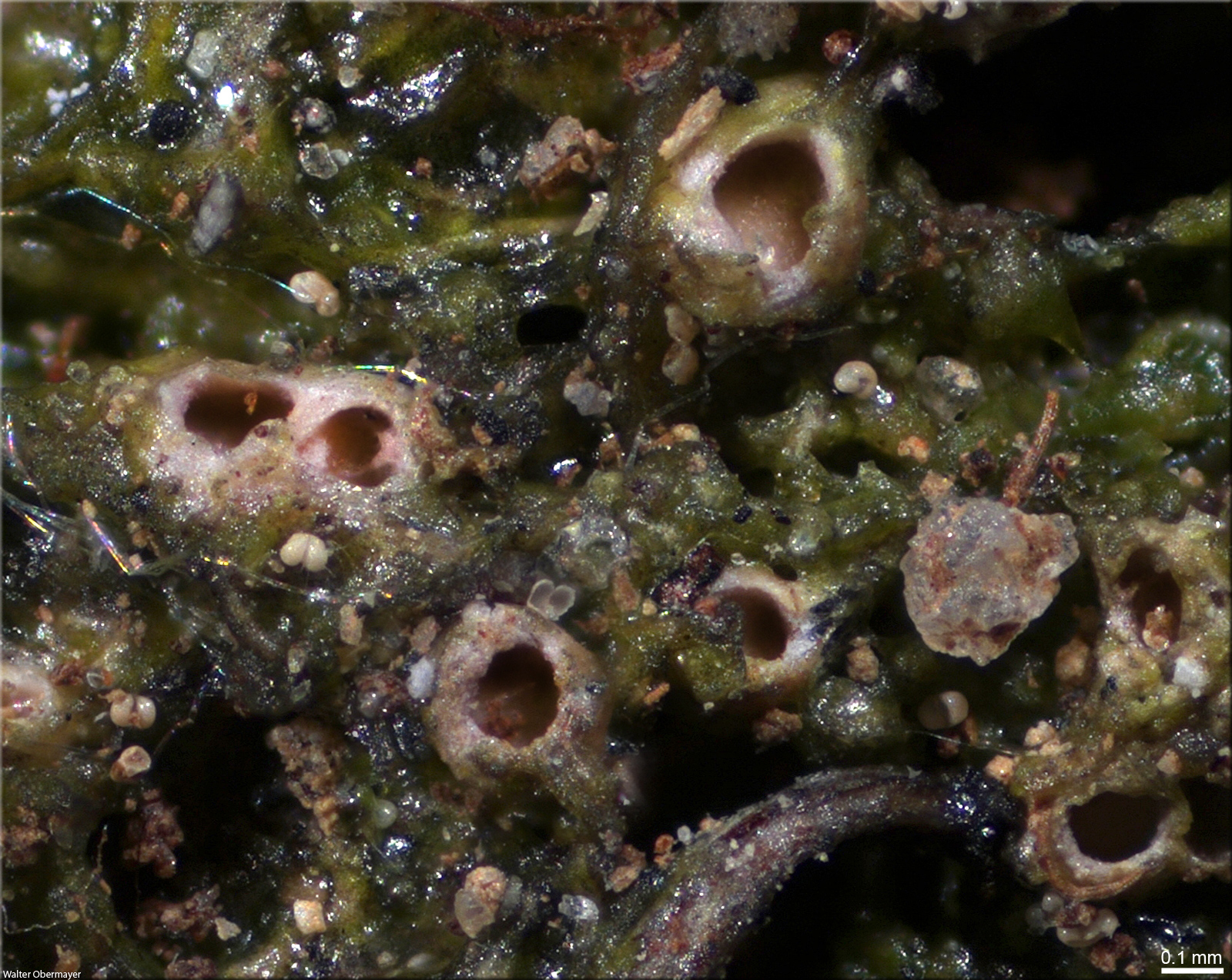
- Cryptodiscus gloeocapsa

Scientific classification
- Kingdom: Fungi
- Division: Ascomycota
- Class: Lecanoromycetes
- Order: Ostropales
- Family: Stictidaceae
- Genus: Cryptodiscus; Corda (1838)

Type species
- Cryptodiscus pallidus (Pers.) Corda (1838)

Synonyms
- Bryophagus Nitschke ex Arnold (1862); Pseudostictis Lambotte (1887); Diplocryptis Clem. (1909); Gloeolecta Lettau (1937); Paschelkiella Sherwood (1987); Lettauia D.Hawksw. & R.Sant. (1990)

= Cryptodiscus =

Genus of lichens

Cryptodiscus is a genus of fungi in the family Stictidaceae. These tiny fungi primarily decompose weathered wood, producing minute, cup-shaped fruiting bodies that remain mostly embedded within their substrate and open through small pores. Most species are wood-decaying saprotrophs found on bark-free branches and logs; one species forms thin, lichen-like crusts on soil and dead moss. The genus is distributed worldwide in boreal and temperate regions.

== Taxonomy ==
The Bohemian mycologist August Carl Joseph Corda established the genus Cryptodiscus in 1838, designating Cryptodiscus pallidus as its type species. The genus belongs to the family Stictidaceae within the order Ostropales.

== Description ==
Most species of Cryptodiscus form no more than a very thin, gelatinous film on the substrate; where it occurs this thallus consists of scattered colonies of a green alga that are pierced by fine, branched fungal hyphae. The photobiont is Gloeocystis‑like, with spherical to elongate cells packed together in mucilaginous clumps.

The sexual fruiting bodies are minute apothecia that begin completely embedded in bark, wood, soil crusts, or the thalli of host lichens. They are initially closed, then break open by a small, round pore that may widen with age, though fully erupting forms are rare. Viewed from above the apothecia appear circular to slightly elliptical; their concave discs are yellow‑, orange‑ or dark‑brown, and the surrounding margin is smooth, pale to brownish, and lacks crystalline deposits. No periphysoids line the pore.

Internally, a thin subhymenium supports a hymenium that turns reddish‑brown in iodine and blue in the Lugol (K/I) test. Numerous thread‑like paraphyses run through this layer; they are generally unbranched but can fork near the tips, which often enlarge into knob‑like cells. The asci are cylindrical to club‑shaped, eight‑spored, and show a faint blue tint in Lugol; each bears a simple apical dome without specialised internal structures. Ascospores are colourless, oval to narrowly ellipsoidal (occasionally thread‑like) and divided by one to seven, rarely up to nine, transverse septa; a few species develop muriform spores with both transverse and longitudinal walls.

Asexual reproduction is known from immersed, flask‑shaped pycnidia that release short cylindrical conidia. Thin-layer chromatography has not revealed any distinctive secondary metabolites in the genus.

== Habitat and distribution ==
Most Cryptodiscus species make their living as wood-decaying saprotrophs. They penetrate weather-beaten, bark-free branches and logs that stay moist but firm, and the minute, cup-shaped fruiting bodies they produce mean the genus is seldom collected even though it is cosmopolitan. A few records document the fungus on less usual substrates—such as rotting palm fronds, club-moss stems or the bracket fungus Stereum—yet the vast majority still come from weathered timber. Swedish field surveys show that individual species of Cryptodiscus favour quite different woody hosts. C. pallidus predominates on broad-leaved timber, especially poplar and willow, but it also occurs on beech, rose canes and, very rarely, juniper. C. foveolaris is less choosy: it colonises a wide variety of both hardwood and conifer substrates and tolerates drier wood than most of its congeners. By contrast, C. tabularum and C. pini are specialists of long-weathered Scots pine (Pinus sylvestris) in mature forests, where they can form locally abundant populations. The only species not confined to wood is the lichen-forming C. gloeocapsa, which forms thin gelatinous crusts on dead moss cushions or open patches of soil.

Geographically, the genus is best documented in the boreal and temperate zones of the Northern Hemisphere. In Sweden all six recognised species range from the far north to the southern counties; the two pine-dwellers also reach Scotland and the Pacific coast of North America. Because their fruit-bodies are so inconspicuous, mycologists expect further species to emerge as dead-wood habitats are examined more closely.

== Species ==
As of July 2025, Species Fungorum accepts 18 species in Cryptodiscus:

- Cryptodiscus cladoniicola (D.Hawksw. & R.Sant.) Pino-Bodas, Zhurb. & S.Stenroos (2017)
- Cryptodiscus epicladonia Zhurb. & Pino-Bodas (2017)
- Cryptodiscus foveolaris (Rehm) Rehm (1888)
- Cryptodiscus galaninae Zhurb. & Pino-Bodas (2017)
- Cryptodiscus gassicurtiae Etayo & Aptroot (2020)
- Cryptodiscus gloeocapsa (Nitschke ex Arnold) Baloch, Gilenstam & Wedin (2009)
- Cryptodiscus ihlenii Zhurb. (2020)
- Cryptodiscus incolor Baloch (2009)
- Cryptodiscus microstoma (Carmich. ex W. Phillips) Sacc. (1889)
- Cryptodiscus minutissimus (Vězda) Baloch (2009)
- Cryptodiscus muriformis Fern.-Brime, Olariaga, Baral, Friebes, Jaklitsch, Senn-Irlet & Wedin (2017)
- Cryptodiscus pallidus (Pers.) Corda (1838)
- Cryptodiscus pini (Romell) Baloch, Gilenstam & Wedin (2009)
- Cryptodiscus pumilus Sherwood (1977)
- Cryptodiscus similis (Vězda) Baloch (2009)
- Cryptodiscus speratus Sherwood (1977)
- Cryptodiscus stereicola (Berk. & M.A.Curtis) Sherwood (1977)
- Cryptodiscus tirolensis F.Berger, Feusi & E.Zimm. (2021)
