= Odontura rhaphidospora =

Scientific classification
- Kingdom: Fungi
- Division: Ascomycota
- Class: Lecanoromycetes
- Order: Odontotrematales
- Family: Odontotremataceae
- Genus: Odontura; Clem. (1909)
- Species: O. rhaphidospora

Binomial name
- Odontura rhaphidospora (Rehm) Clem. (1909)

Synonyms
- Odontotremella Rehm (1912)

Species of fungus

Odontura is a fungal genus in the family Odontotremataceae. It is a monotypic genus, containing the single species Odontura rhaphidospora.
