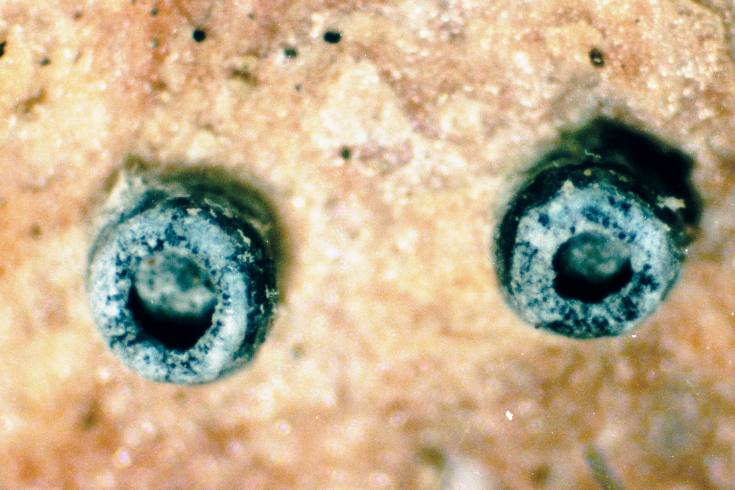
- Herbarium specimen of Conotrema urceolatum (40X magnification), member of the Ostropales

Scientific classification
- Kingdom: Fungi
- Division: Ascomycota
- Class: Lecanoromycetes
- Subclass: Ostropomycetidae
- Order: Ostropales; Nannf. (1932)

Families
- Odontotremataceae; Phaneromycetaceae; Spirographaceae; Stictidaceae

= Ostropales =

Order of fungi

The Ostropales are an order of fungi in the class Lecanoromycetes. The order was circumscribed by Swedish botanist John Axel Nannfeldt in 1932. The order contains 4 families and 46 genera, including 6 genera of uncertain familial placement.

== Families and genera ==
- Odontotremataceae D.Hawksw. & Sherwood (1982)

Claviradulomyces – 2 spp.
Coccomycetella – 2 spp.
Odontotrema – 7 spp.
Odontura – 1 sp.
Paschelkiella – 1 sp.
Potriphila – 3 spp.
Rogellia – 2 spp.
Stromatothecia – 1 sp.
Tryblis – 2 spp.
Xerotrema – 2 spp.

- Phaneromycetaceae Gamundí & Spinedi (1986)

Phaneromyces – 2 spp.

- Spirographaceae Flakus, Etayo & Miadlikowska (2019)

Spirographa – 5 spp.

- Stictidaceae Fr. (1849)

Absconditella – 12 spp.
Acarosporina – 5 spp.
Biostictis – 5 spp.
Carestiella – 2 sp.
Conotremopsis – 1 sp.
Cryptodiscus – 15 spp. *
Cyanodermella – 2 spp.
Delpontia – 1 sp.
Fitzroyomyces – 1 sp.
Geisleria – 4 spp.
Glomerobolus – 1 sp.
Ingvariella – 1 sp.
Karstenia – 10 spp.
Lillicoa – 4 spp.
Nanostictis – ca. 8 spp.
Neofitzroyomyces – 1 sp.
Ostropa – 1 sp.
Propoliopsis – 1 sp.
Robergea – 8 spp.
Schizoxylon – ca. 35 spp.
Sphaeropezia – 19 spp.
Stictis – 4 spp.
Stictophacidium – 3 spp.
Thelopsis – 9 spp.
Topelia – 6 spp.
Trinathotrema – 3 spp.
Xyloschistes – 1 sp.

Ostropales genera of unknown familial placement:

Aabaarnia Diederich (2014) – 1 sp.
Biazrovia Zhurb. & Etayo (2013) – 1 sp.
Elongaticonidia W.J.Li, E.Camporesi & K.D.Hyde (2020) – 1 sp.
Malvinia Döbbeler (2003) – 1 sp.
Normanogalla Diederich (2014) – 1 sp.
