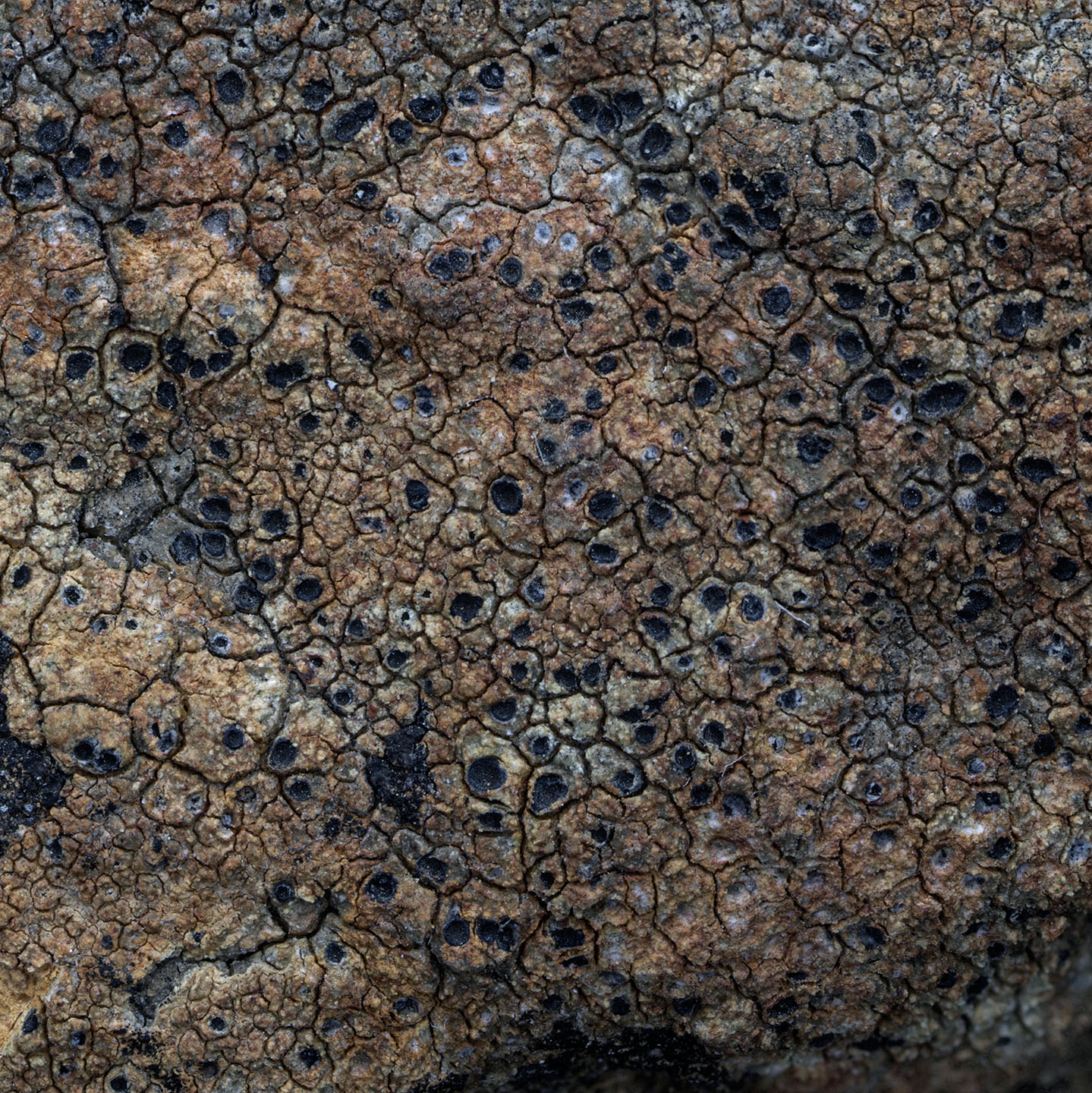

Scientific classification
- Domain: Eukaryota
- Kingdom: Fungi
- Division: Ascomycota
- Class: Lecanoromycetes
- Order: Ostropales
- Family: Stictidaceae
- Genus: Ingvariella; Guderley & Lumbsch (1997)

Type species
- Ingvariella bispora (Bagl.) Guderley & Lumbsch (1997)

= Ingvariella =

Genus of fungi

Ingvariella is a lichen genus in the family Stictidaceae. Circumscribed in 1997, the genus is monotypic, containing the single widespread lichen species Ingvariella bispora. The species was originally called Urceolaria bispora by Italian lichenologist Francesco Baglietto in 1871. Ingvariella is named in honour of Swedish lichenologist Ingvar Kärnefelt.
