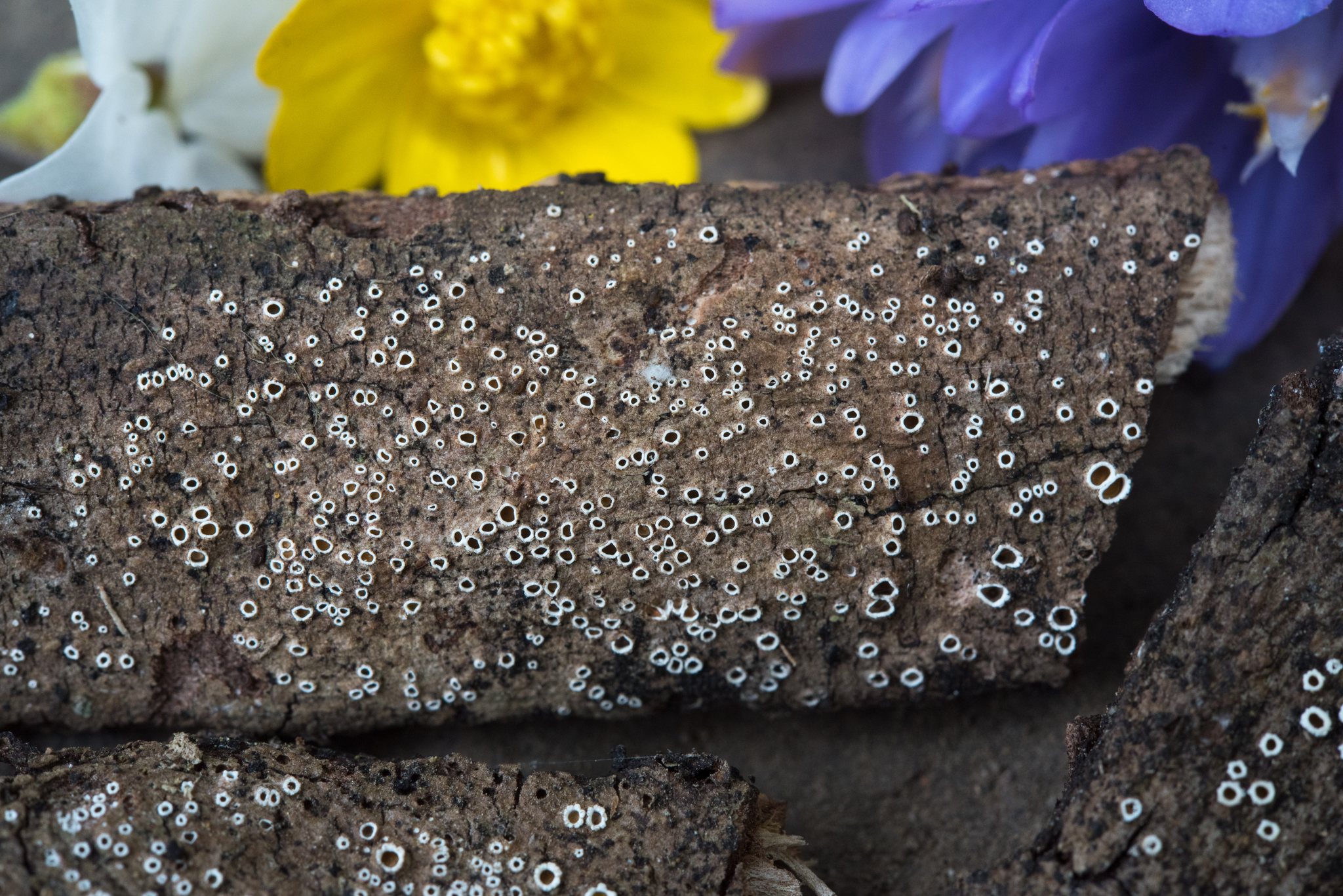
- Stictis radiata

Scientific classification
- Kingdom: Fungi
- Division: Ascomycota
- Class: Lecanoromycetes
- Order: Ostropales
- Family: Stictidaceae; Fr. (1849)

Type genus
- Stictis Pers. (1800)

= Stictidaceae =

Family of fungi

The Stictidaceae are a family of fungi in the order Ostropales. It has 30 genera and about 240 species.

== Taxonomy ==
The family was circumscribed by the Swedish mycologist Elias Magnus Fries in 1849.

== Description ==
Members of the Stictidaceae are diverse in their lifestyles, ranging from saprotrophic (feeding on decaying matter) and parasitic to lichen-forming organisms, and rare occurrences as lichen dwellers. Some species within this group show facultative lichenisation: they have the ability to switch between lifestyles, forming lichens when growing on bark, or living as saprotrophs, depending on their environment. The thallus of these fungi is typically crust-like in form. In cases where a photobiont, or photosynthetic partner, is present, it is usually of the chlorococcoid type, which consists spherical green algae.

The reproductive structures, known as ascomata, have a range from apothecial (open, disk-like) to perithecial (flask-like) forms. They can have various forms, from biatorine, which are apothecial with a thalline margin, to lecideine, which lacks a thalline margin, or even zeorine. Often, these structures have an inner crystalline layer within their margins. The internal structure of the ascomata features paraphyses – sterile filaments – that are unbranched and sometimes have swollen ends. These paraphyses are amyloid. Periphysoids, which are hair-like structures, typically line the outer part of the ascomata, known as the excipulum.

The asci (spore-producing cells) are thin-walled with a small, apical structure protruding into the internal cavity, known as the lumen. These structures are non-amyloid and cylindrical in shape. Typically, each ascus contains eight ascospores, but some species may have more due to spore fragmentation. These spores are diverse in shape, ranging from ellipsoid to filament-like, and are hyaline, meaning they are translucent. They have a variety of segmentations, from crosswise partitions to occasionally being multi-chambered (muriform), and have thin septa and walls. There is no known formation of conidiomata, asexual reproductive structures, in this family.

== Genera ==
This is a list of the genera contained within the Stictidaceae, based on a 2022 review and summary of fungal classification. Following the genus name is the taxonomic authority, year of publication, and the number of species:

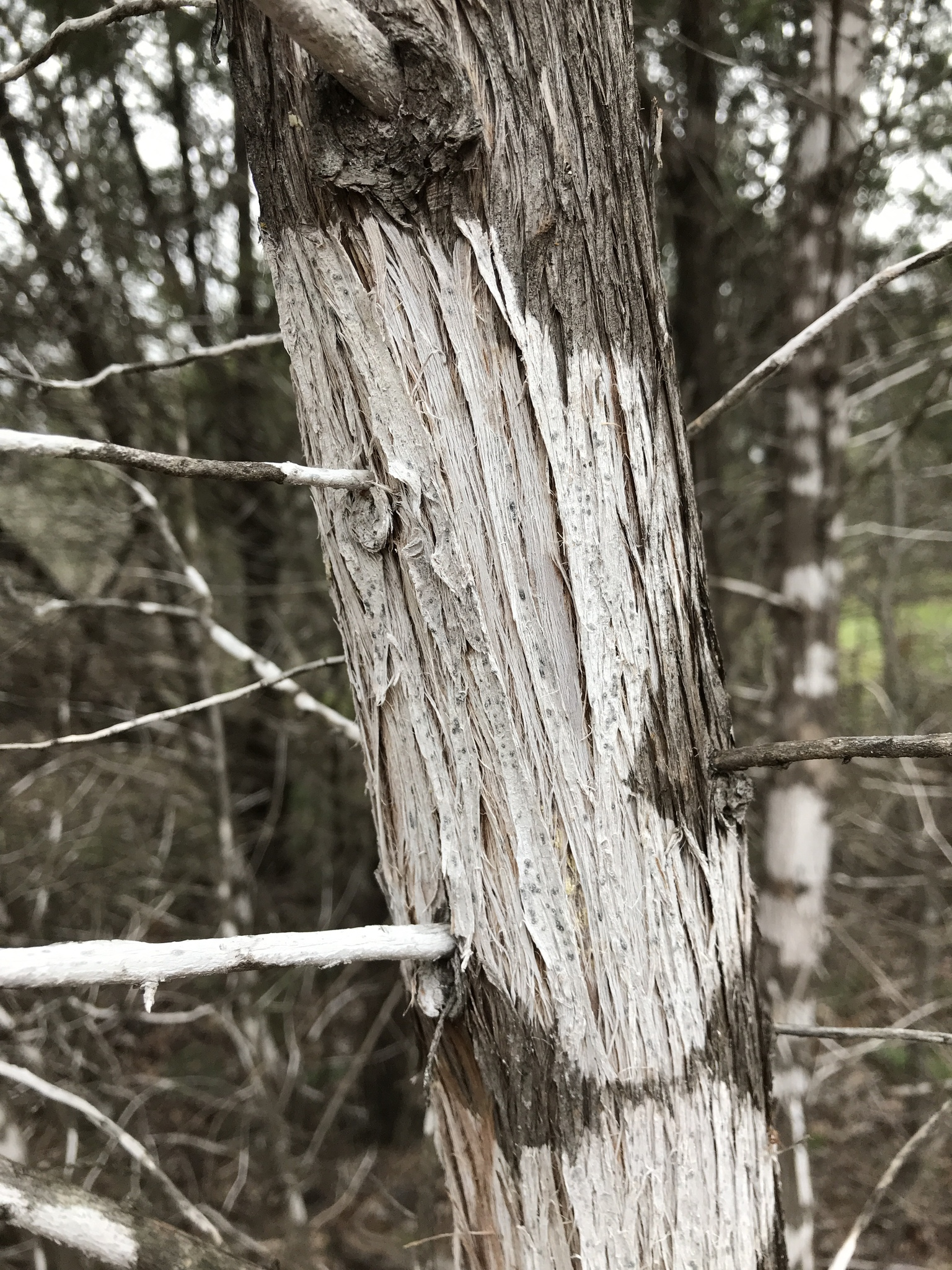
Robergea albicedrae

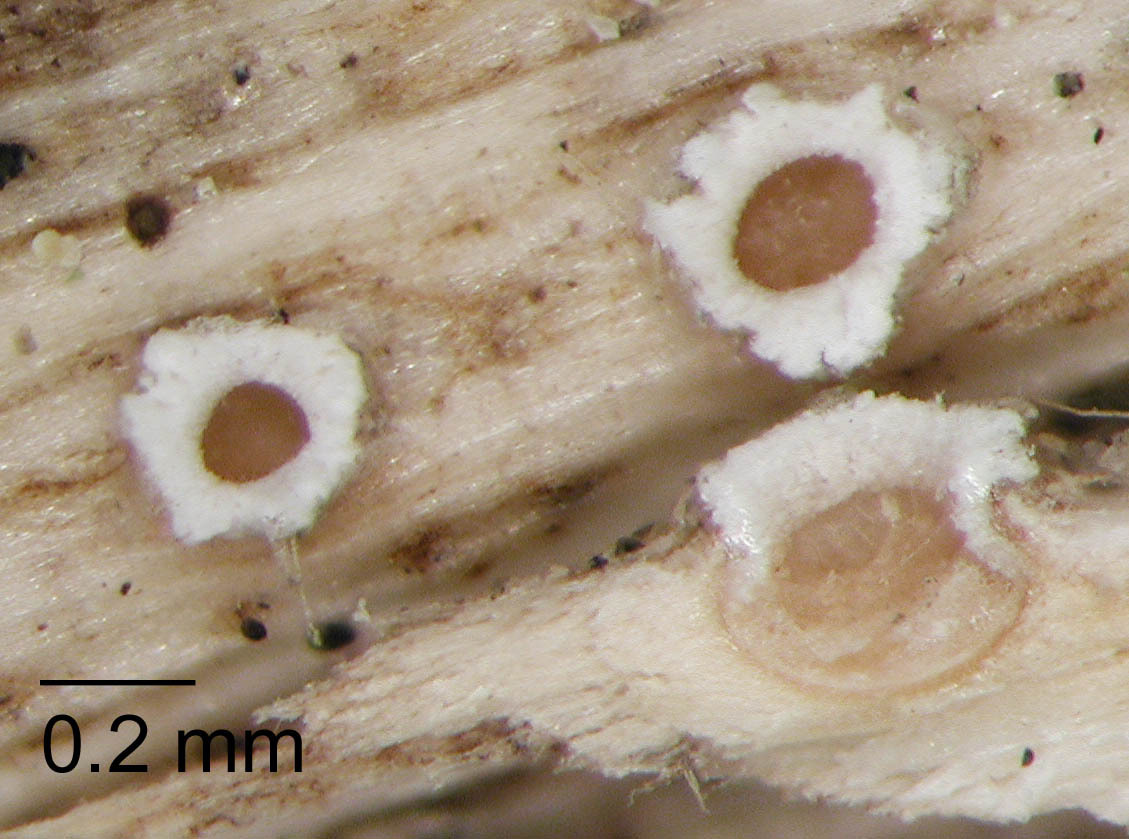
Stictis cordylines

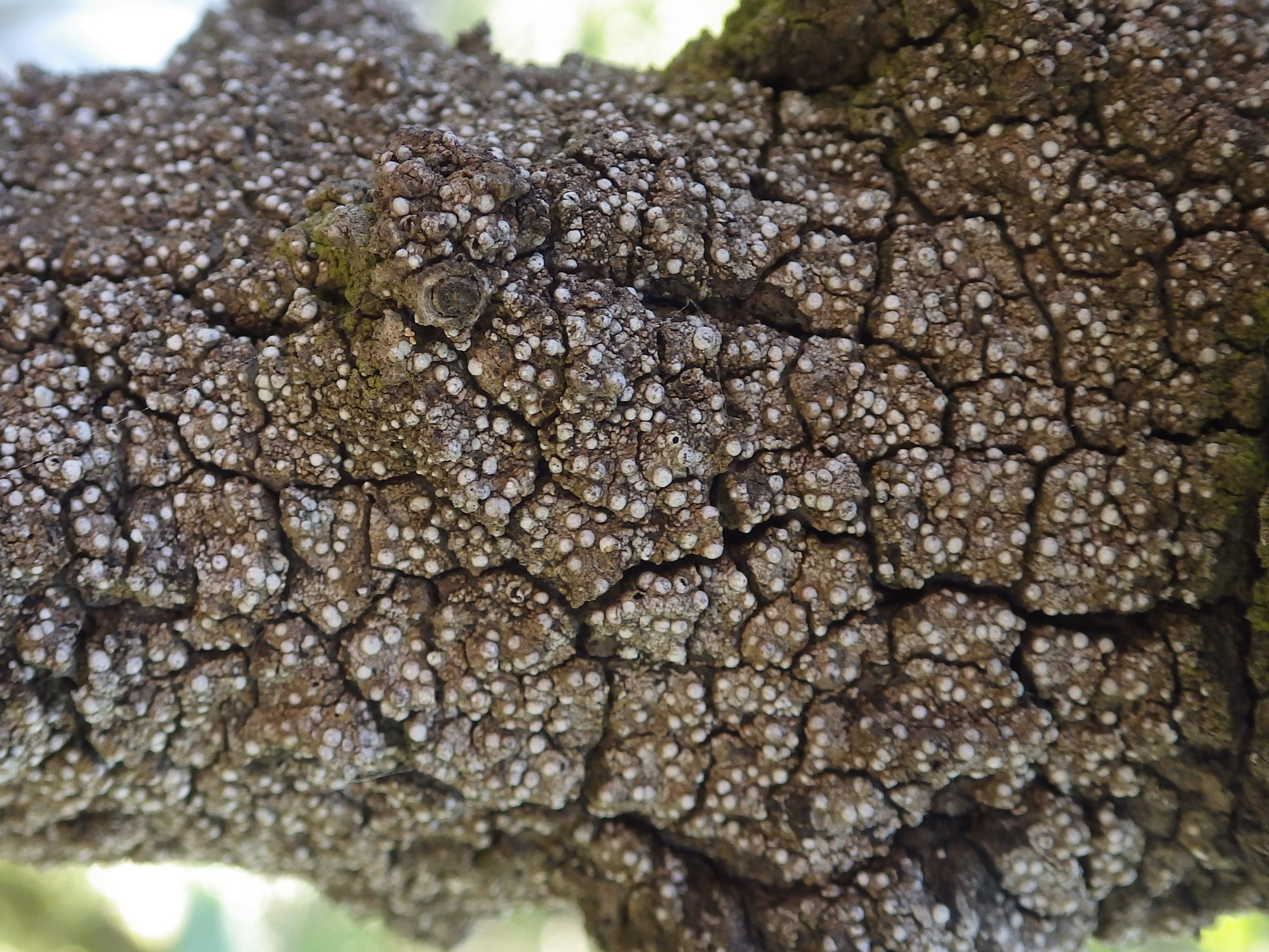
Thelopsis isiaca

- Absconditella Vězda (1965) – 16 spp.
- Acarosporina Sherwood (1977) – 5 spp.
- Biostictis Petr. (1950) – 5 spp.
- Carestiella Bres. (1897) – 2 sp.
- Conotremopsis Vězda (1977) – 1 sp.
- Cryptodiscus Corda (1938) – 46 spp.
- Cyanodermella O.E.Erikss. (1981) – 2 spp.
- Delpontia Penz. & Sacc. (1902) – 1 sp.
- Dendroseptoria Alcalde (1948) – 3 spp.
- Fitzroyomyces Crous (2017) – 1 sp.
- Geisleria Nitschke (1861) – 1 sp.
- Glomerobolus Kohlm. & Volkm.-Kohlm. (1996) – 1 sp.
- Ingvariella Guderley & Lumbsch (1997) – 1 sp.
- Karstenia Fr. (1885) – 10 spp.
- Lillicoa Sherwood (1977) – 42 spp.
- Nanostictis M.S.Christ. (1954) – ca. 8 spp.
- Neofitzroyomyces Crous (2018) – 1 sp.
- Ostropa Fr. (1825) – 1 sp.
- Ostropomyces Thiyagaraja, Lücking, Ertz & K.D.Hyde (2021) – 2 spp.
- Propoliopsis Rehm (1914) – 1 sp.
- Robergea Desm. (1847) – 8 spp.
- Schizoxylon Pers. (1811) – ca. 35 spp.
- Sphaeropezia Sacc. (1884) – 19 spp.
- Stictis Pers. (1800) – 4 spp.
- Stictospora Cif. (1957) - 1 spp
- Stictophacidium Rehm (1888) – 3 spp.
- Thelopsis Nyl. (1855) – 9 spp.
- Topelia P.M.Jørg. & Vězda (1984) – 6 spp.
- Trinathotrema Lücking, Rivas Plata & Mangold (2011) – 3 spp.
- Xyloschistes Vain. ex Zahlbr. (1903) – 1 sp.
