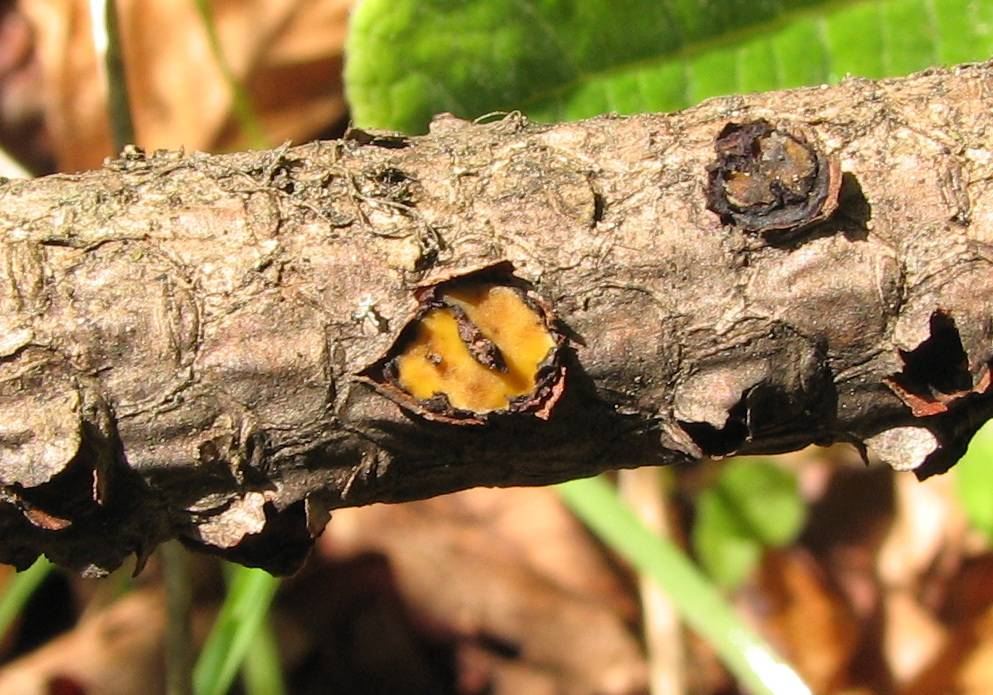

Scientific classification
- Domain: Eukaryota
- Kingdom: Fungi
- Division: Ascomycota
- Class: Leotiomycetes
- Order: Rhytismatales
- Family: Rhytismataceae
- Genus: Zeus; Minter & Diam. (1987)

Type species
- Zeus olympius Minter & Diam. (1987)

= Zeus (fungus) =

Genus of fungi

Zeus is a fungal genus within the family Rhytismataceae. It is a monotypic genus, containing the single species Zeus olympius, originally discovered in 1987 on Mount Olympus in Greece. Fruit bodies are yellow discs that grow in the decaying wood of Bosnian pine trees.

== Taxonomy and classification ==
Zeus olympius was first described scientifically 1987 by David Minter and Stephanos Diamandis, based on collections made by the latter from Greece's Mount Olympus. The generic and specific epithets refer to the king of the gods in Ancient Greek mythology, who is said to have lived on Mount Olympus.

Based on physical characteristics, Zeus produces fruit bodies that are most similar to Colpoma, Therrya, and Coccomyces, all genera in the order Rhytismatales. The authors also noted some similarities with Cerion and Ocotomyces. None of these genera have species with ellipsoid ascospores; ascospore shape is known to be an important criterion in the Rhytismatales for distinguishing between genera, so the authors felt justified in creating a new genus for their discovery.

== Description ==
Unopened fruit bodies of Zeus olympius are circular blackened crusts that occur below the bark. When ripe, the fruit body expands, breaking through the bark, and the crust splits radially into small black teeth. This exposes the fertile layer (hymenium), which is an orange- to golden-coloured angular or circular disc ranging from 0.2–5 mm in diameter.

The spores are thin-walled, smooth, more or less ellipsoidal, and measure 12–15 by 5–8 μm. The asci are eight-spored, and measure about 110–120 by 10–12.5 μm before the spores are discharged.

== Habitat and distribution ==
Zeus olympius is known only from the type locality in Greece, at an elevation of about 1,300 metres (4,300 ft) on Mount Olympus, as well as from the Pirin and Slavyanka Mountain in Bulgaria. The fruit bodies grow scattered or in small groups on the dead portions of twigs and small branches of Bosnian pine (Pinus leucodermis) that are still living towards their bases. This habitat suggests that the fungus may be a parasite or a facultative endophyte. Although its conservation status is not officially listed by the IUCN, it is considered "potentially Critically Endangered". Threats to its habitat include forest fires and climate change.
