= List of Coccomyces species =

This is a list of the fungus species in the genus Coccomyces. As of February 2023, Species Fungorum lists 121 species and GBIF lists 130 species including sequenced but not yet named species.

== A ==
- Coccomyces agathidicola Spooner (1990)
- Coccomyces alienus Y.R. Lin (2015)
- Coccomyces anhuiensis Tu Lv & Cheng Lin Hou (2018)
- Coccomyces annulatus Sherwood (1980)
- Coccomyces antillarum Sherwood (1980)
- Coccomyces araucariae Butin & Speer (1979)
- Coccomyces arbutifolius Sherwood (1980)
- Coccomyces arctostaphyli (Rehm) B. Erikss. (1970)
- Coccomyces arctostaphyloides Moreno-Rico & Crous (2014)
- Coccomyces atactus Rehm (1888)
- Coccomyces aurei Lar.N. Vassiljeva (1979)
- Coccomyces australis P.R. Johnst. (2007)

== B-C ==
- Coccomyces basizonatus Spooner (1990)
- Coccomyces binnaburrensis P.R. Johnst. (2000)
- Coccomyces bipartitus (Kauffman) Sherwood (1980)
- Coccomyces boydii A.L. Sm. (1908)
- Coccomyces canarii Rehm (1913)
- Coccomyces castanopsidis (Seaver) Sherwood (1980)
- Coccomyces cembrae Rehm (1885)
- Coccomyces chuniae Y. Wu, Y.X. Chen, Y.Q. Meng & Y.R. Lin (2016)
- Coccomyces circinatus Y.R. Lin & C.T. Xiang (2000)
- Coccomyces clavatus P.R. Johnst. (1986)
- Coccomyces clementsiorum Magnes (1997)
- Coccomyces clusiae (Lév.) Sacc. (1889)
- Coccomyces cocoes Dennis (1953)
- Coccomyces concolor Sherwood (1980)
- Coccomyces consociatus Petr. (1948)
- Coccomyces coronatus (Schumach.) De Not. (1859)
- Coccomyces crateriformis Y.R. Lin & Z.Z. Li (2000)
- Coccomyces croceus Spooner (1990)
- Coccomyces crystalligerus Sherwood (1980)
- Coccomyces cunninghamii P.R. Johnst. (2000)
- Coccomyces cupressinus P.R. Johnst. (1986)
- Coccomyces cyclobalanopsidis Y.R. Lin & Z.Z. Li (2000)

== D-I ==
- Coccomyces delta (Kunze ex Fr.) Cooke (1892)
- Coccomyces dentatus (J.C. Schmidt & Kunze) Sacc. (1877)
- Coccomyces dimorphus S.W. Liang, X.Y. Tang & Y.R. Lin (2000)
- Coccomyces duplicarioides Sherwood (1980)
- Coccomyces ellipticus Z.J. Li & C.L. Hou (2014)
- Coccomyces ericae Dennis & Spooner (1977)
- Coccomyces fagicola T. Lv & C.L. Hou (2019)
- Coccomyces farlowii Sherwood (1980)
- Coccomyces foliicola (Dennis & Spooner) Sherwood (1980)
- Coccomyces fujianensis Y.R. Lin & C.T. Xiang (2000)
- Coccomyces fuscus Spooner (1990)
- Coccomyces gaultheriae (Dearn.) DiCosmo, Nag Raj & W.B. Kendr. (1983)
- Coccomyces globososimilis P.R. Johnst. (2000)
- Coccomyces globosus P.R. Johnst. (1986)
- Coccomyces guizhouensis Y.R. Lin & B.F. Hu (1994)
- Coccomyces hainanensis Y.F. Xu, F. Peng, Y.Q. Meng & Y.R. Lin (2016)
- Coccomyces heterophyllae A. Funk (1968)
- Coccomyces huangshanensis Y.R. Lin & Z.Z. Li (2000)
- Coccomyces hubeiensis Y.R. Lin & M.S. Yang (2013)
- Coccomyces hypodermatis C.L. Hou & M. Piepenbr. (2009)
- Coccomyces ilicis S.J. Wang & Y.R. Lin (2013)
- Coccomyces illicii Z.J. Li & C.L. Hou (2014)
- Coccomyces illiciicola He Y. Liu, Y.R. Lin & C.T. Xiang (1999)
- Coccomyces insignis P. Karst. (1888)
- Coccomyces irretitus Sherwood (1980)

== J-M ==
- Coccomyces jiangxiensis H.L. Gu & Y.R. Lin (2015)
- Coccomyces keteleeriae Y.R. Lin (1994)
- Coccomyces kinabaluensis Spooner (1990)
- Coccomyces kirkii Spooner (1990)
- Coccomyces lauraceus P.R. Johnst. (1986)
- Coccomyces ledi Rehm (1913)
- Coccomyces leptideus (Fr.) B. Erikss. (1970)
- Coccomyces leptosporus Speg. (1885)
- Coccomyces libocedri P.R. Johnst. (1986)
- Coccomyces lijiangensis C.L. Hou & M. Piepenbr. (2007)
- Coccomyces limitatus (Berk. & M.A. Curtis) Sacc. (1889)
- Coccomyces longwoodicus P.R. Johnst. (1986)
- Coccomyces magnus Y.R. Lin & Z.Z. Li (2000)
- Coccomyces mertensianae Sherwood (1986)
- Coccomyces minimus Y.R. Lin, C.L. Hou & G.J. Jia (2011)
- Coccomyces monticola Sherwood (1980)
- Coccomyces mucronatoides Y.R. Lin, Q. Zheng & S.M. Yu (2011)
- Coccomyces mucronatus Korf & W.Y. Zhuang (1985)
- Coccomyces multangularis Y.R. Lin & Z.Z. Li (2001)

== N-Q ==
- Coccomyces neolitseae Qing Li & Y.R. Lin (2015)
- Coccomyces niveus C.L. Hou & M. Piepenbr. (2009)
- Coccomyces noosanus P.R. Johnst. (2000)
- Coccomyces occultus Y.R. Lin & Z.Z. Li (1999)
- Coccomyces palmicola Sherwood (1980)
- Coccomyces pampeanus Speg. (1896)
- Coccomyces papillatus Sherwood (1978)
- Coccomyces paraphysincrustatus Spooner (1990)
- Coccomyces parasiticus P.R. Johnst. (1993)
- Coccomyces parvulus Sherwood (1980)
- Coccomyces petersii (Berk. & M.A. Curtis) Sherwood (1980)
- Coccomyces philippinus (Rehm) Sherwood (1980)
- Coccomyces phyllocladi P.R. Johnst. (1986)
- Coccomyces phyllocladicola Spooner (1990)
- Coccomyces pinicola R.H. Lei & C.L. Hou (2013)
- Coccomyces ponticus Tobias (1986)
- Coccomyces prominens Y.F. Xu & Y.R. Lin (2015)
- Coccomyces proteae Marinc., M.J. Wingf. & Crous (2008)
- Coccomyces pseudotsugae A. Funk (1975)
- Coccomyces puiggarii Speg. (1918)
- Coccomyces pumilio (Velen.) Magnes (1997)
- Coccomyces pycnophyllocladi P.R. Johnst. (2021)
- Coccomyces quercicola T. Lv & C.L. Hou (2019)

== R-Z ==
- Coccomyces radiatus Sherwood (1980)
- Coccomyces shennongjiaensis T. Lv & C.L. Hou (2019)
- Coccomyces sichuanensis Korf & W.Y. Zhuang (1985)
- Coccomyces sinensis Y.R. Lin & Z.Z. Li (2001)
- Coccomyces spegazzinii Sacc. (1889)
- Coccomyces strobi J. Reid & Cain (1961)
- Coccomyces strobilicola Spooner (1987)
- Coccomyces strobilinus Grelet (1959)
- Coccomyces symploci Y.R. Lin & Z.Z. Li (2001)
- Coccomyces taiwanensis C.L. Hou, R. Kirschner & Chee J. Chen (2006)
- Coccomyces tesselatus Sherwood (1980)
- Coccomyces triangularis (Schwein.) Sacc. (1889)
- Coccomyces triseptatus Spooner (1990)
- Coccomyces tumidus (Fr.) De Not. (1847)
- Coccomyces tympanibaculi P.R. Johnst. (2000)
- Coccomyces tympanidiosporus Sherwood (1980)
- Coccomyces urceoloides Spooner (1990)
- Coccomyces urceolus Sherwood (1980)
- Coccomyces venezuelae Sherwood (1980)
- Coccomyces vilis Syd., P. Syd. & E.J. Butler (1911)
- Coccomyces wagnerianus (Rehm) Rehm (1912)
- Coccomyces walkeri P.R. Johnst. (2000)
