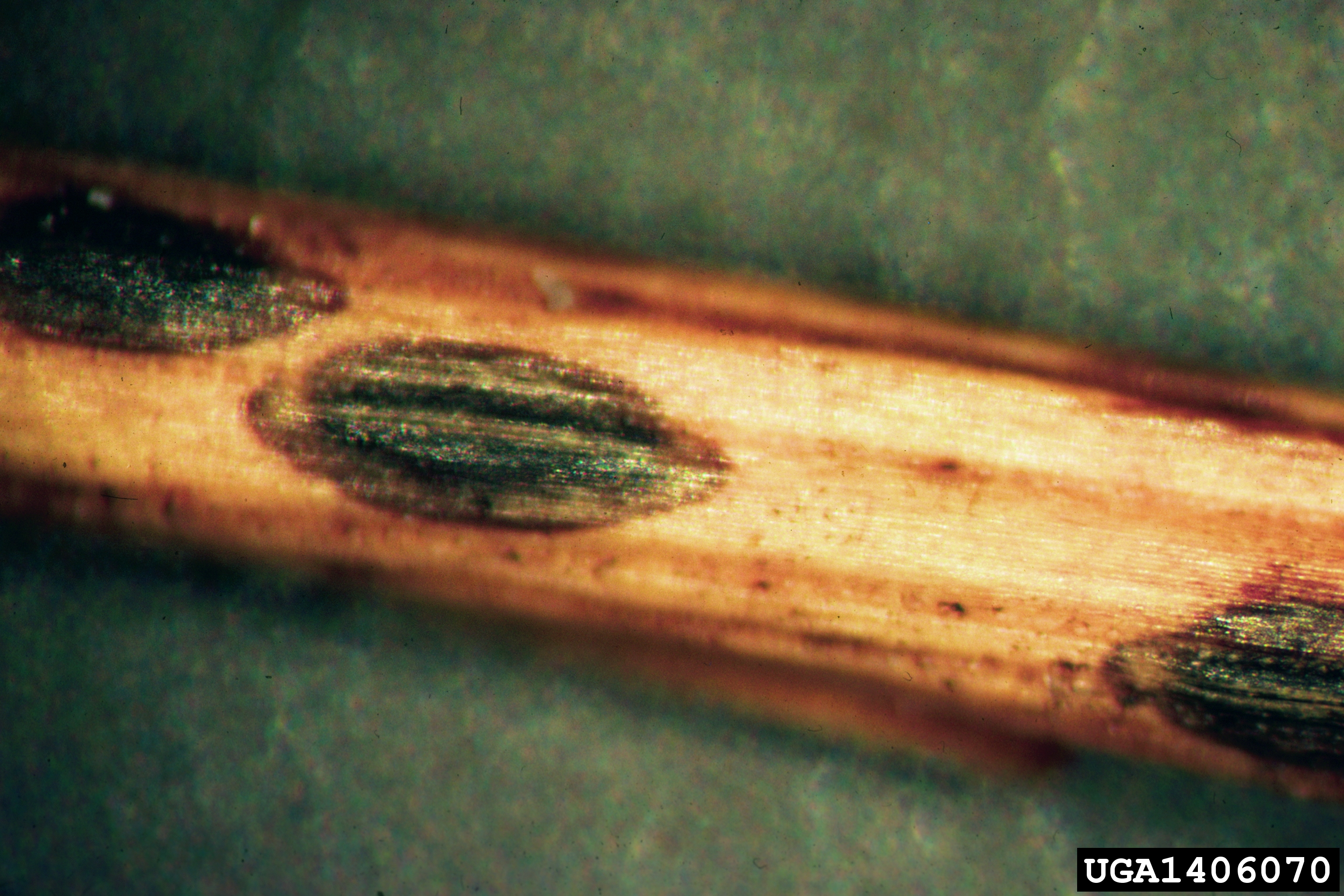

Scientific classification
- Domain: Eukaryota
- Kingdom: Fungi
- Division: Ascomycota
- Class: Leotiomycetes
- Order: Rhytismatales
- Family: Rhytismataceae
- Genus: Lophodermium
- Species: L. pinastri

Binomial name
- Lophodermium pinastri (Schrad.) Chevall.

= Lophodermium pinastri =

Species of fungi

Lophodermium pinastri is a fungus in the genus Lophodermium. Like most species in the genus, it is an endophyte and saprophyte of pine (Pinus spp.) needles.

== Ecology ==
Lophodermium pinastri has been reported on numerous species of Pinus and can act as an endophyte, a saprophyte, or in rare instances, as a pathogen. It is frequently confused with Lophodermium seditiosum - a more serious and damaging pathogen than L. pinastri.
