= Lophodermella sulcigena =

Scientific classification
- Kingdom: Fungi
- Division: Ascomycota
- Class: Leotiomycetes
- Order: Rhytismatales
- Family: Rhytismataceae
- Genus: Lophodermella
- Species: L. sulcigena

Binomial name
- Lophodermella sulcigena (Link) Höhn. (1917)

Synonyms
- List: Hypodermium sulcigenum Link (1825); Uredinaria sulcigena (Link) Chevall. (1826); Schizoderma sulcigenum (Link) Duby (1830); Hypodermella sulcigena (Link) Tubeuf (1895); Hypoderma sulcigenum Rostr. (1883); Hypoderma pinicola Brunch. (1893); Hypodermopsis pinicola (Brunch.) Kuntze (1898)

Species of fungus

Lophodermella sulcigena is a species of fungus in the family Rhytismataceae. It is a plant pathogen that affects the needles of two-needle pine trees.

== Taxonomy ==
Originally described as a new species by Johann Heinrich Friedrich Link in 1825, it was reclassified in genus Lophodermella by Franz Xaver Rudolf von Höhnel in 1917.

== Ecology ==
Lophodermella sulcigena is a needle-infecting pathogen that attacks two-needle pines, including Pinus mugo, P. nigra and P. sylvestris. In high-elevation P. mugo stands of the Polish Tatra Mountains (Chochołowska Valley), it was identified as the main cause of an endemic needle disease observed from 2015 to 2020: a few weeks after needles emerge, the tips die and discolour (often reddish-brown, later pale grey) while a short basal segment remains green, and in the following June–July the previous year's needles bear elongated black fruiting bodies (hysterothecia) that develop beneath the hypodermis (the strengthening tissue just below the needle surface) and open by a longitudinal slit before the needles finally drop. The species typically forms mostly eight-spored asci and hyaline, club-shaped ascospores about 35–64 × 4.5–6.0 micrometres surrounded by a gelatinous sheath, but the study observed atypical small spores and variation in spore number and shape that can complicate identification. DNA sequences from Polish material place L. sulcigena closest to the North American species Lophodermella montivaga. The authors also documented a range of "secondary" fungi growing on infected needles and even within hysterothecia, suggesting that co-colonisers may interfere with ascospore release and could influence outbreak severity.
