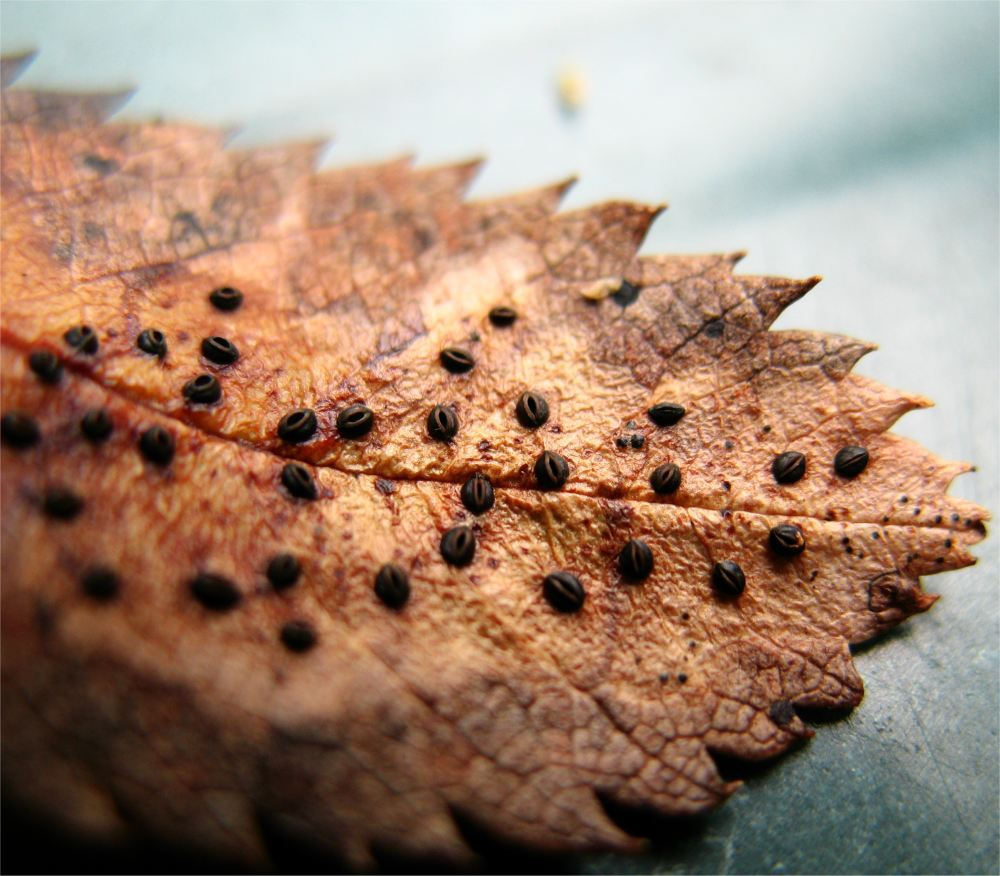

Scientific classification
- Domain: Eukaryota
- Kingdom: Fungi
- Division: Ascomycota
- Class: Leotiomycetes
- Order: Rhytismatales
- Family: Rhytismataceae
- Genus: Lophodermium
- Species: L. aucupariae

Binomial name
- Lophodermium aucupariae Chevall

= Lophodermium aucupariae =

Species of fungus

Lophodermium aucupariae is a plant pathogen.
