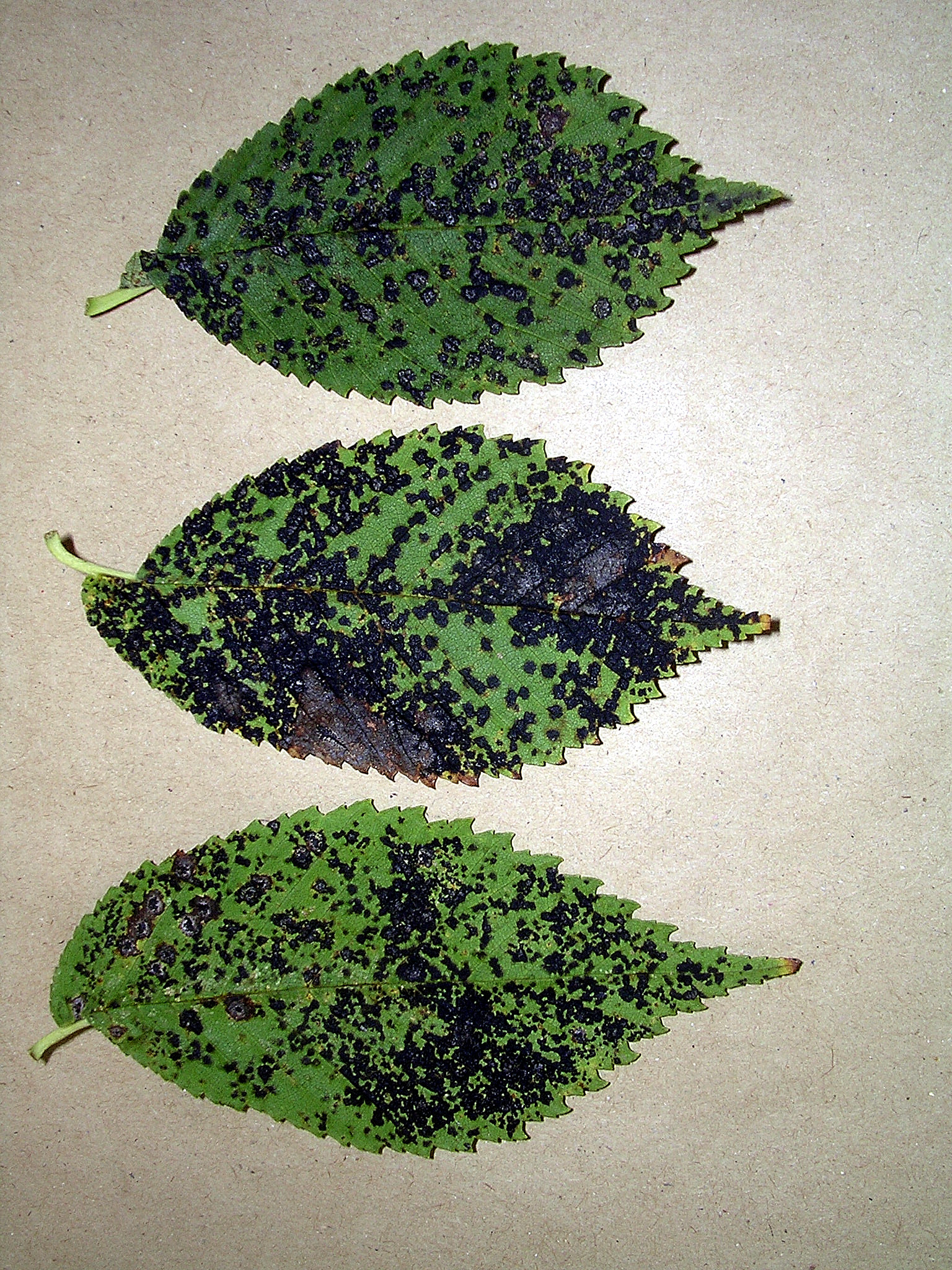

Scientific classification
- Kingdom: Fungi
- Division: Ascomycota
- Class: Leotiomycetes
- Order: Rhytismatales
- Family: Rhytismataceae
- Genus: Rhytisma
- Species: R. ulmi

Binomial name
- Rhytisma ulmi Fr. (1828)

= Rhytisma ulmi =

Species of fungus

Rhytisma ulmi is a species of fungus commonly found on elms in North America
