= Vladracula almoreum =

Scientific classification
- Kingdom: Fungi
- Division: Ascomycota
- Class: Leotiomycetes
- Order: Rhytismatales
- Family: Rhytismataceae
- Genus: Vladracula
- Species: V. almoreum

Binomial name
- Vladracula almoreum R.C.Gupta & Fotedar

Species of fungus

Vladracula almoreum is a pathogenic fungus of the family Rhytismataceae. The fungus is only known to grow on living Indian maple trees in southern Asia.
