= Lophodermium caricinum =

Scientific classification
- Domain: Eukaryota
- Kingdom: Fungi
- Division: Ascomycota
- Class: Leotiomycetes
- Order: Rhytismatales
- Family: Rhytismataceae
- Genus: Lophodermium
- Species: L. caricinum

Binomial name
- Lophodermium caricinum (Roberge ex Desm.) Duby

Species of fungus

Lophodermium caricinum is a species of fungus in the family Rhytismataceae. It is a decomposer known to live on dead tissues of Carex capillaris, Carex machlowiana, Eriophorum angustifolium and Kobresia myosuroides.
