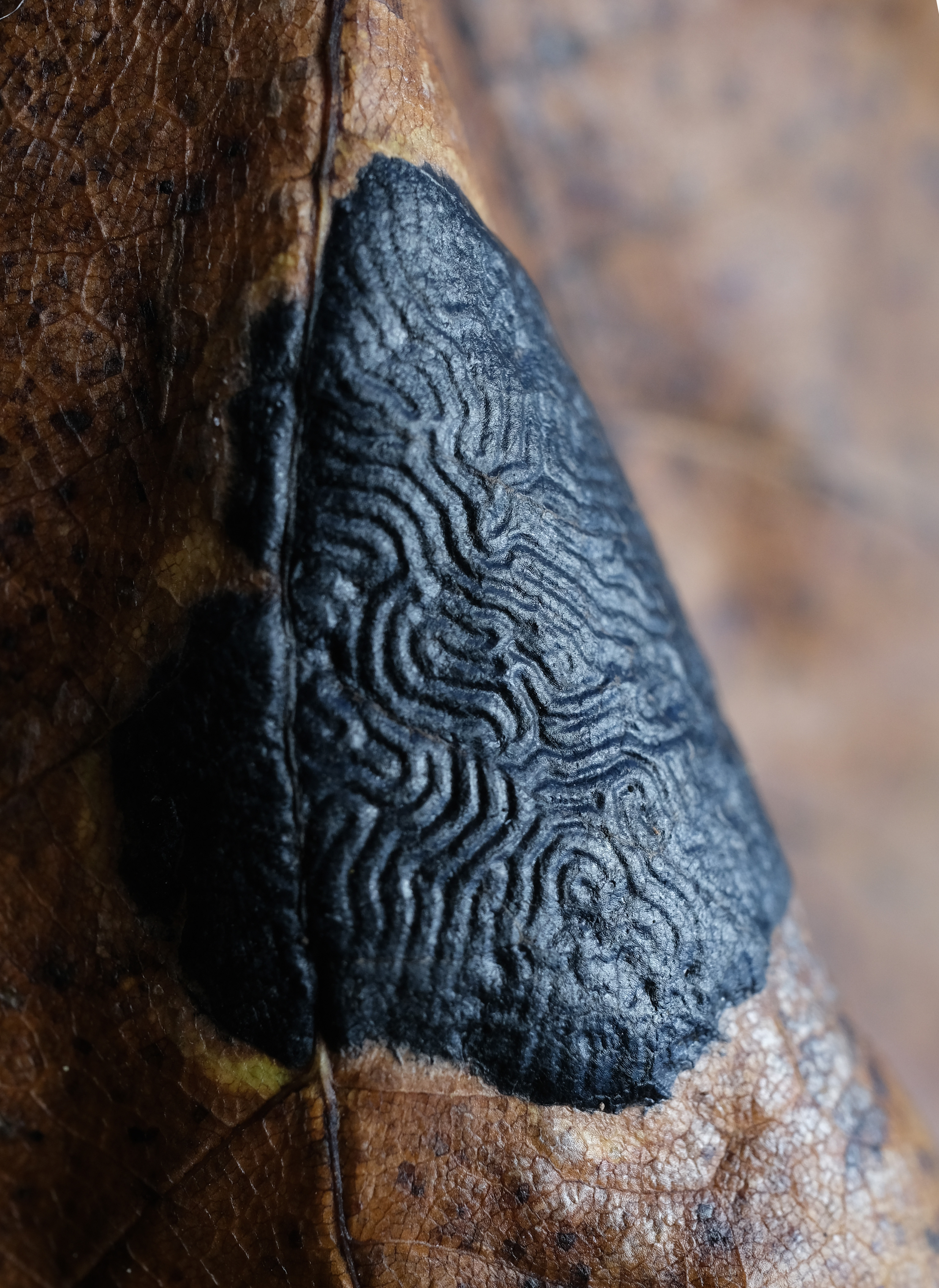

Scientific classification
- Kingdom: Fungi
- Division: Ascomycota
- Class: Leotiomycetes
- Order: Rhytismatales
- Family: Rhytismataceae
- Genus: Rhytisma
- Species: R. americanum

Binomial name
- Rhytisma americanum Hudler & Banik

= Rhytisma americanum =

Species of fungus

Rhytisma americanum is a species of ascomycete fungus in the family Rhytismataceae. It was described in 1998 by W. Hudler and M. Banik in the journal Mycotaxon. The species belongs to the genus Rhytisma, a group of tarspot fungi within the order Rhytismatales.

== Distribution ==
Rhytisma americanum has been recorded from North America. Occurrences are documented in fungus collection databases and biodiversity aggregators.
