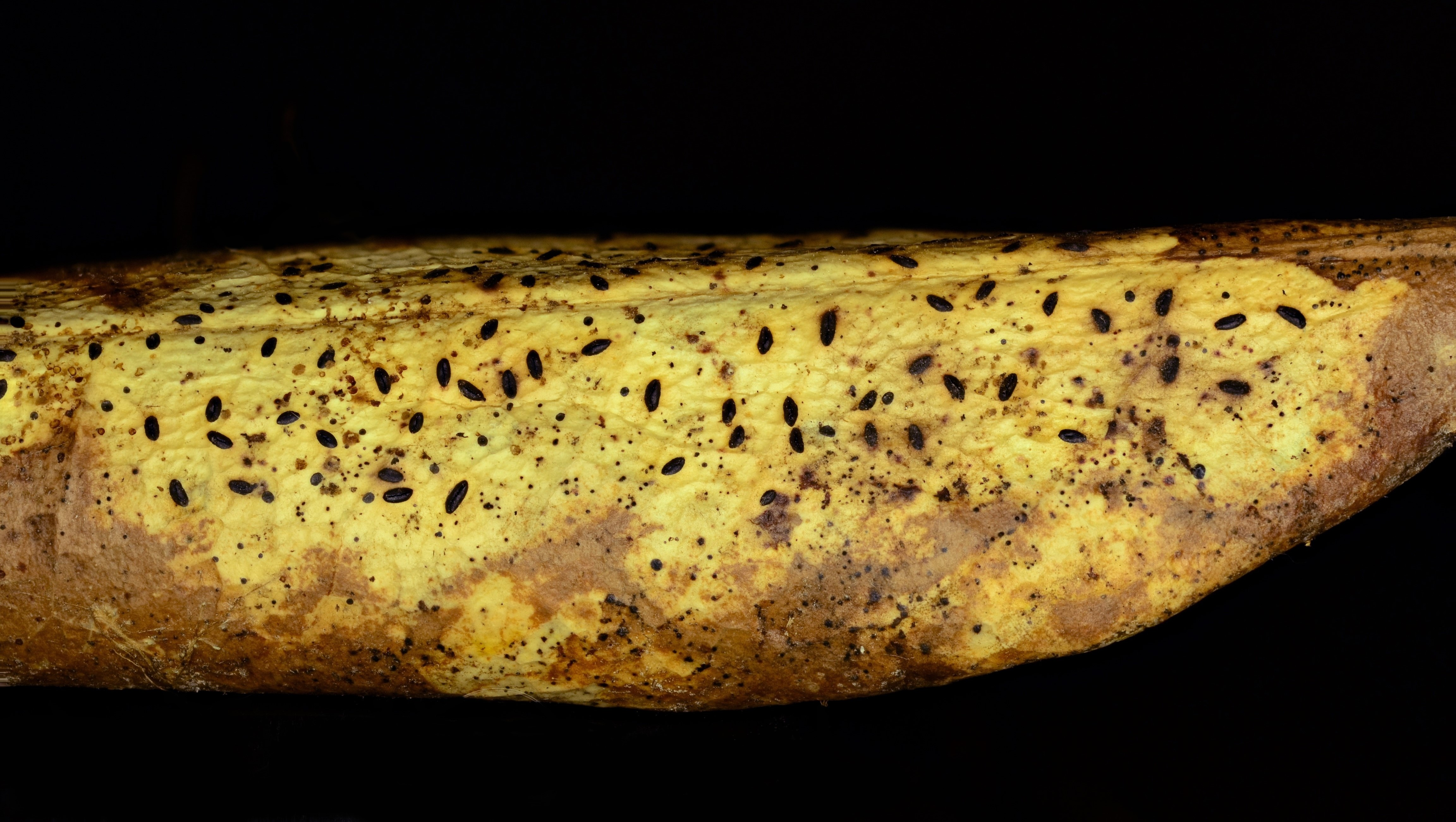

Scientific classification
- Kingdom: Fungi
- Division: Ascomycota
- Class: Leotiomycetes
- Order: Rhytismatales
- Family: Rhytismataceae
- Genus: Lophodermium
- Species: L. schweinitzii

Binomial name
- Lophodermium schweinitzii M. Wilson & N.F. Robertson, (1947)

Synonyms
- Coccomyces rhododendri (Schwein.) Sacc., (1889); Hysterium rhododendri Schwein., (1832); Lophodermina rhododendri (Schwein.) Tehon, (1935)

= Lophodermium schweinitzii =

Species of fungus

Lophodermium schweinitzii is a plant pathogen.
