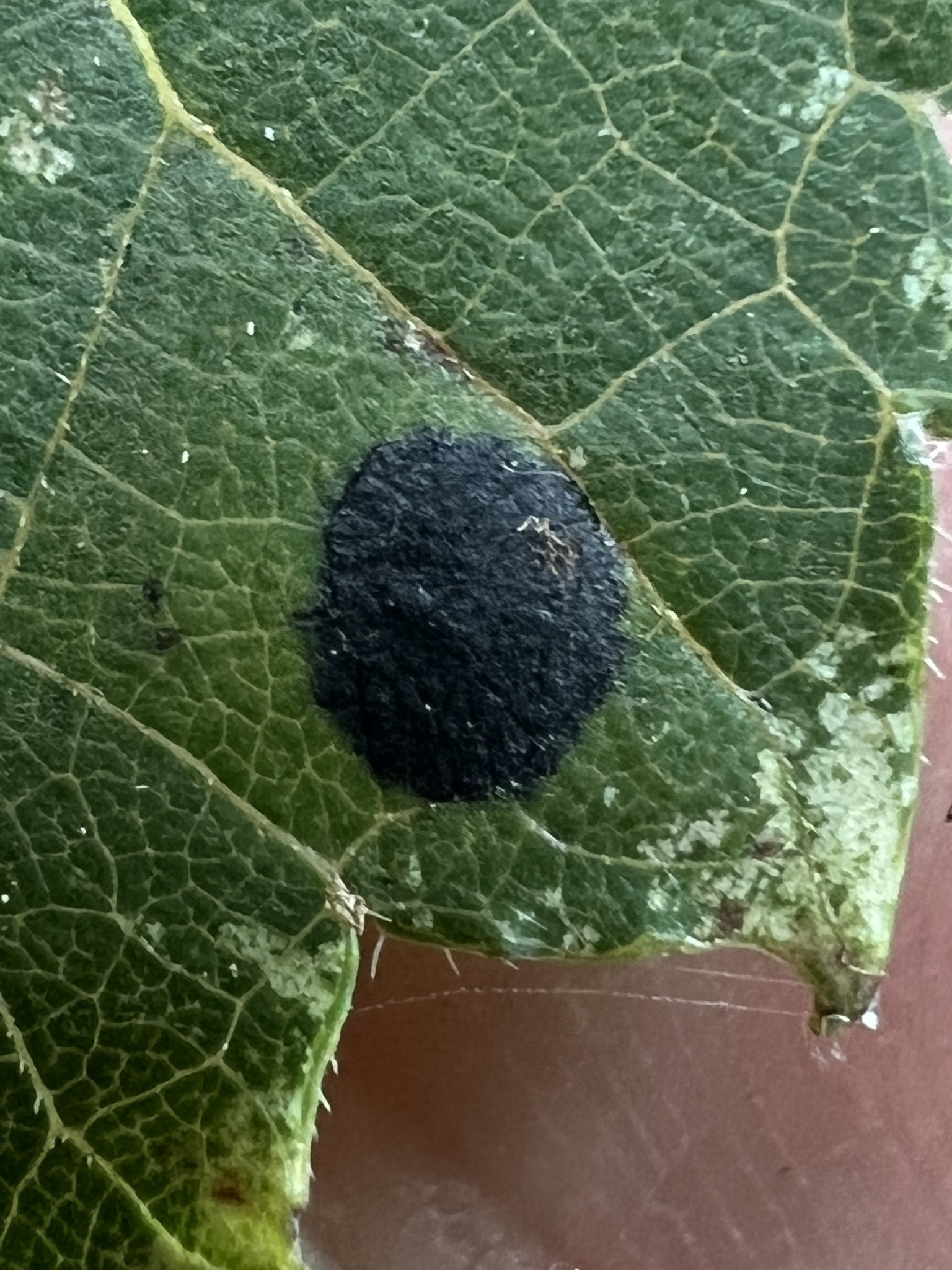
- On Vitis vulpina

Scientific classification
- Domain: Eukaryota
- Kingdom: Fungi
- Division: Ascomycota
- Class: Leotiomycetes
- Order: Rhytismatales
- Family: Rhytismataceae
- Genus: Rhytisma
- Species: R. vitis

Binomial name
- Rhytisma vitis Schwein. (1832)

= Rhytisma vitis =

Species of fungus

Rhytisma vitis is a species of fungus in the family Rhytismataceae. It was described by Lewis David de Schweinitz in 1832.
