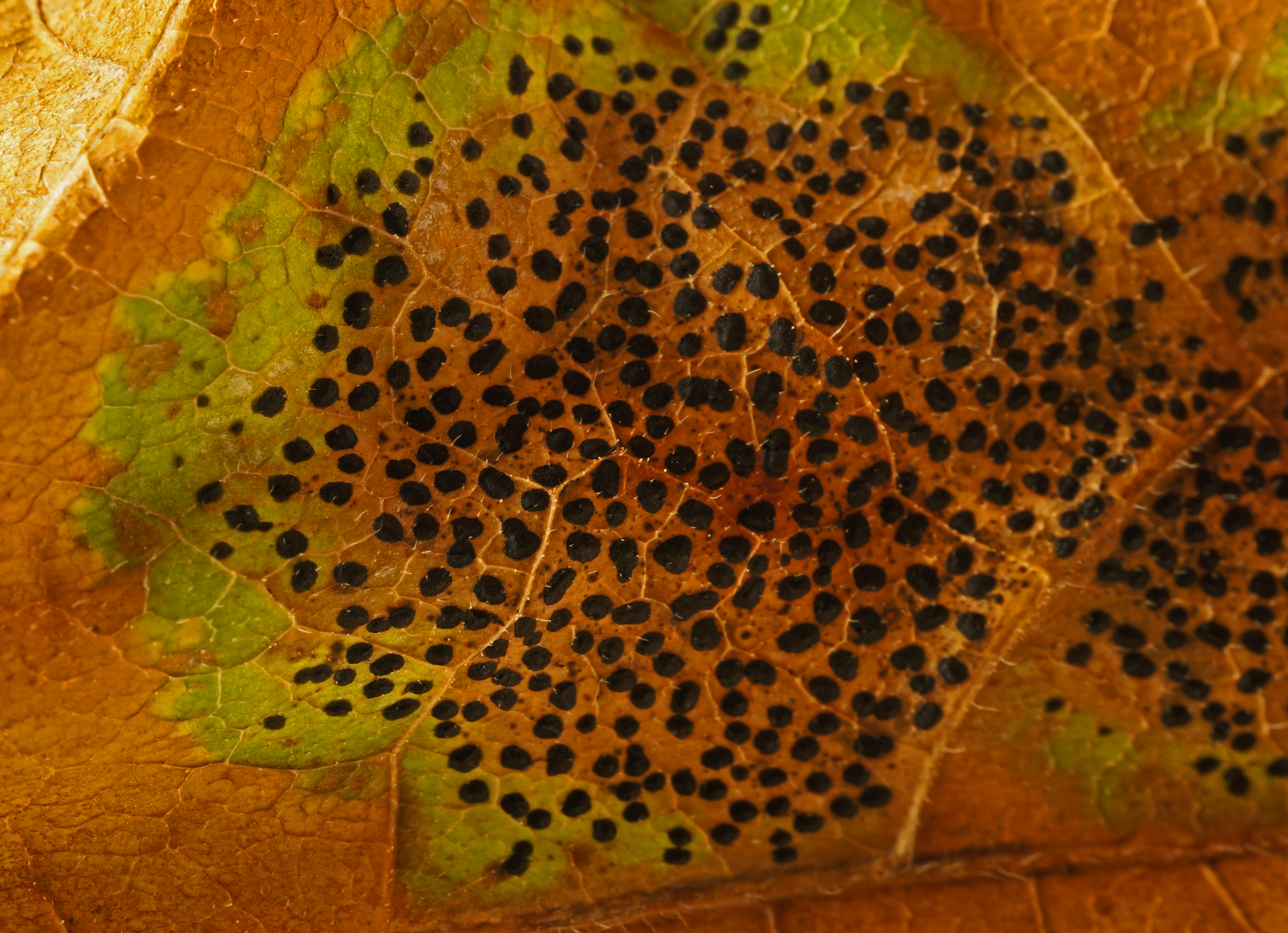

Scientific classification
- Domain: Eukaryota
- Kingdom: Fungi
- Division: Ascomycota
- Class: Leotiomycetes
- Order: Rhytismatales
- Family: Rhytismataceae
- Genus: Rhytisma
- Species: R. punctatum

Binomial name
- Rhytisma punctatum (Pers.) Fr. (1823)

Synonyms
- Xyloma punctatum Pers. (1800); Placuntium punctatum (Pers.) Ehrenb. (1818); Sphaeria subconfluens Schwein. (1832); Melasmia punctata Sacc. & Roum. (1882); Diatrype subconfluens Cooke (1885)

= Rhytisma punctatum =

Species of fungus

Rhytisma punctatum is a species of fungus in the family Rhytismataceae. The fungus causes speckled tar spot of maple leaves. The small spots are black, raised from the leaf surface, and occur in dense groups on the upper surface. Areas afflicted by the fungus will retain their color even after the remainder of the leaf has faded.
