= V. robusta =

V. robusta may refer to:

- Virgella robusta, a fungus species
- Vriesea robusta, a plant species native to Venezuela

== See also ==
- Robusta
