= Soleella =

Scientific classification
- Kingdom: Fungi
- Division: Ascomycota
- Class: Leotiomycetes
- Order: Rhytismatales
- Family: Rhytismataceae
- Genus: Soleella; Darker

Type species
- Soleella striiformis (Darker) Darker

Genus of fungi

Soleella is a genus of fungi within the Rhytismataceae family. The genus contains four species.
