= Lirula =

Scientific classification
- Kingdom: Fungi
- Division: Ascomycota
- Class: Leotiomycetes
- Order: Rhytismatales
- Family: Rhytismataceae
- Genus: Lirula; Darker

Type species
- Lirula nervisequa

Genus of fungi

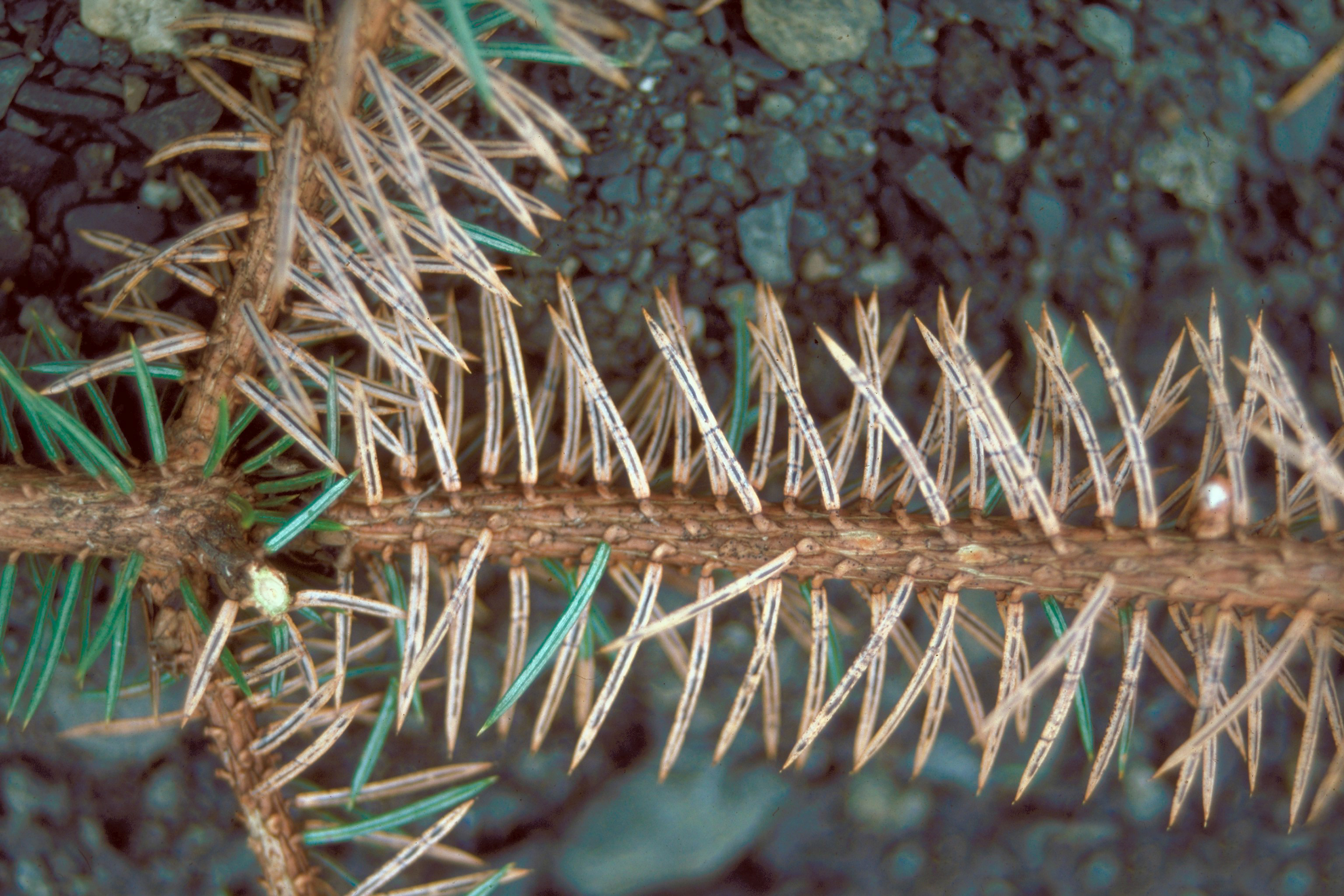
Lirula needle blight on spruce

Lirula is a genus of seven species of fungi within the Rhytismataceae family.

Fungi in the genus cause diseases of trees; for example, Lirula macrospora causes needle blight of spruces such as Picea pungens and Picea glauca.
