= Sporomega =

Scientific classification
- Kingdom: Fungi
- Division: Ascomycota
- Class: Leotiomycetes
- Order: Rhytismatales
- Family: Rhytismataceae
- Genus: Sporomega; Corda

Type species
- Sporomega degenerans (Fr.) Corda

Species
- S. andromedae S. degenerans S. uraniae

Genus of fungi

Sporomega is a genus of fungi within the Rhytismataceae family.
