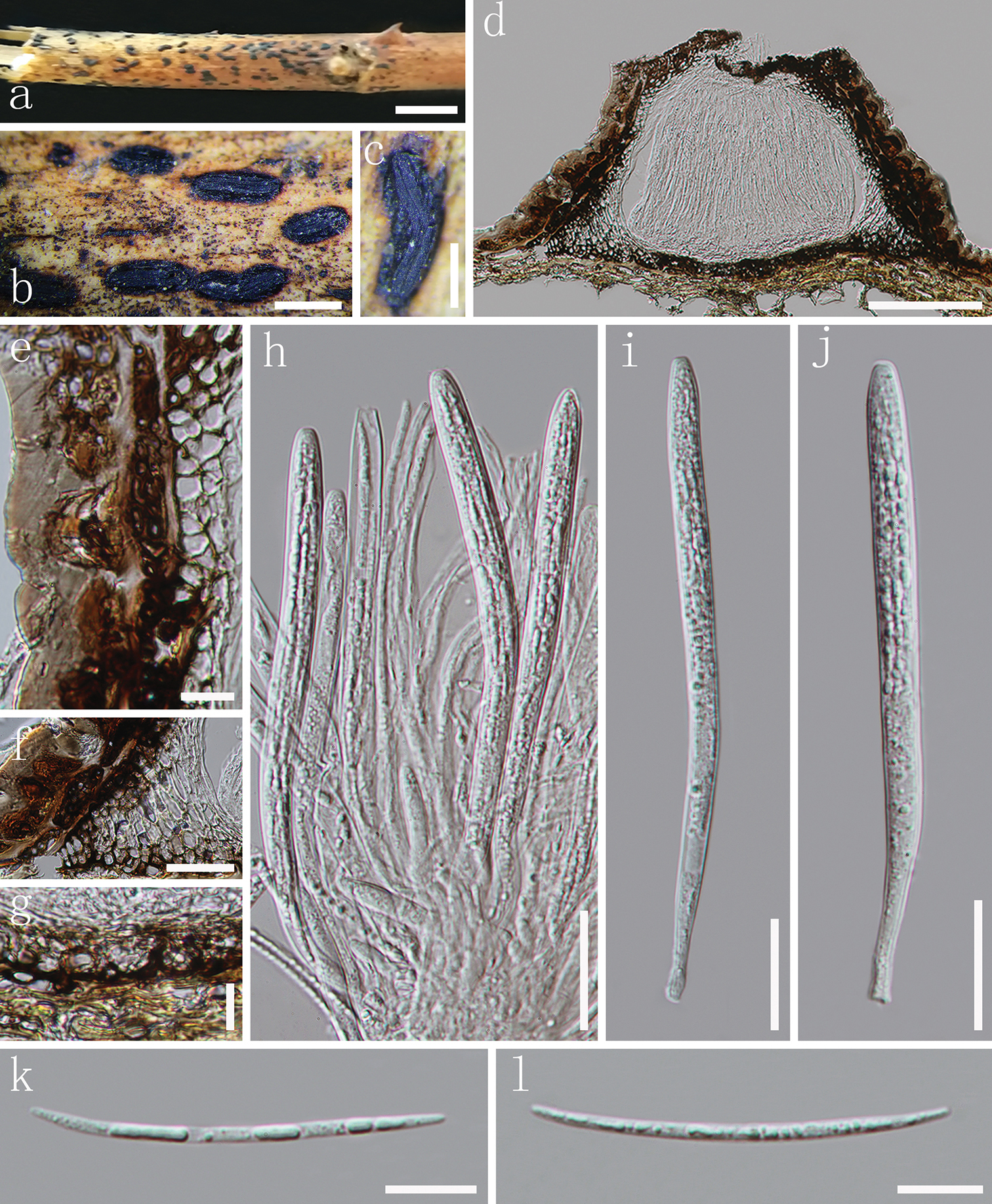
- Terriera meitanensis

Scientific classification
- Kingdom: Fungi
- Division: Ascomycota
- Class: Leotiomycetes
- Order: Rhytismatales
- Family: Rhytismataceae
- Genus: Terriera; B. Erikss.

Type species
- Terriera cladophila (Lév.) B. Erikss.

= Terriera =

Genus of fungi

Terriera is a genus of fungi within the Rhytismataceae family. The genus contains 16 species.
