= Myriophacidium =

Scientific classification
- Kingdom: Fungi
- Division: Ascomycota
- Class: Leotiomycetes
- Order: Rhytismatales
- Family: Rhytismataceae
- Genus: Myriophacidium; Sherwood

Type species
- Myriophacidium aphyophyllicum Sherwood

Genus of fungi

Myriophacidium is a genus of fungi within the Rhytismataceae family. The genus contains four species.
