= Canavirgella =

Scientific classification
- Kingdom: Fungi
- Division: Ascomycota
- Class: Leotiomycetes
- Order: Rhytismatales
- Family: Rhytismataceae
- Genus: Canavirgella; W. Merr, Wenner & Dreisbach

Type species
- Canavirgella banfieldii W. Merr., N.G. Wenner & Dreisbach

Genus of fungi

Canavirgella is a genus of fungi within the Rhytismataceae family. This is a monotypic genus, containing the single species Canavirgella banfieldii.
