= Ceratophacidium =

Scientific classification
- Kingdom: Fungi
- Division: Ascomycota
- Class: Leotiomycetes
- Order: Rhytismatales
- Family: Rhytismataceae
- Genus: Ceratophacidium; J. Reid & Piroz.

Type species
- Ceratophacidium aristosporum (Bonar) J. Reid & Piroz.

Genus of fungi

Ceratophacidium is a genus of fungi within the Rhytismataceae family. This is a monotypic genus, containing the single species Ceratophacidium aristosporum.
