= Bifusepta =

Scientific classification
- Domain: Eukaryota
- Kingdom: Fungi
- Division: Ascomycota
- Class: Leotiomycetes
- Order: Rhytismatales
- Family: Rhytismataceae
- Genus: Bifusepta; G.D. Darker, 1963
- Species: B. tehonii

Binomial name
- Bifusepta tehonii Darker

Synonyms
- Bifusella vaccinii Tehon

Monotypic genus of fungi

Bifusepta is a genus of fungi within the Rhytismataceae family. This is a monotypic genus, containing the single species Bifusepta tehonii.
