= Coccomyces clavatus =

Scientific classification
- Domain: Eukaryota
- Kingdom: Fungi
- Division: Ascomycota
- Class: Leotiomycetes
- Order: Rhytismatales
- Family: Rhytismataceae
- Genus: Coccomyces
- Species: C. clavatus

Binomial name
- Coccomyces clavatus Johnston, 1986

Species of fungus

Coccomyces clavatus is a species of foliicolous fungus found on fallen phylloclades of Phyllocladus alpinus in New Zealand.

The ascocarps are angular, up to 0.8 mm in diameter, forming within pale yellow lesions. The asci have a broad apex and the paraphyses are unbranched. This species is very similar to Coccomyces phyllocladi, found on the same host, and can only be distinguished by the smaller, clavate ascospores.
