= Ploioderma =

Scientific classification
- Kingdom: Fungi
- Division: Ascomycota
- Class: Leotiomycetes
- Order: Rhytismatales
- Family: Rhytismataceae
- Genus: Ploioderma; Darker.

Type species
- Ploioderma hedgcockii (Dearn.) Darker

Genus of fungi

Ploioderma is a genus of fungi within the Rhytismataceae family. The genus contains five species.
