= Parvacoccum =

Scientific classification
- Kingdom: Fungi
- Division: Ascomycota
- Class: Leotiomycetes
- Order: Rhytismatales
- Family: Rhytismataceae
- Genus: Parvacoccum; R.S. Hunt & A. Funk

Type species
- Parvacoccum pini R.S. Hunt & A. Funk

Genus of fungi

Parvacoccum is a genus of fungi within the Rhytismataceae family. This is a monotypic genus, containing the single species Parvacoccum pini.
