= Nymanomyces =

Scientific classification
- Kingdom: Fungi
- Division: Ascomycota
- Class: Leotiomycetes
- Order: Rhytismatales
- Family: Rhytismataceae
- Genus: Nymanomyces; P. Henn.

Type species
- Nymanomyces aceris-laurini Henn.

Species
- N. aceris-laurini N. xolismae

Synonyms
- Synglonium Penzig & P.A.Saccardo, 1897

Genus of fungi

Nymanomyces is a genus of fungi within the Rhytismataceae family. It has been found in the Caribbean.

The genus name of Nymanomyces is in honour of Erik Olof August Nyman (1866-1900), who was a Swedish botanist (Mycology and Bryology) who studied plants on Java and New Guinea.

The genus was circumscribed by Paul Christoph Hennings in Monsunia vol.1 on page 28 in 1899.
