= Isthmiella =

Scientific classification
- Domain: Eukaryota
- Kingdom: Fungi
- Division: Ascomycota
- Class: Leotiomycetes
- Order: Rhytismatales
- Family: Rhytismataceae
- Genus: Isthmiella; Darker, 1967

Type species
- Isthmiella abietis (Dearn.) Darker

Species
- Isthmiella abietis (Dearn.) Darker; Isthmiella crepidiformis (Darker) Darker; Isthmiella fauilli (Darker) Darker; Isthmiella quadrispora Ziller

Genus of fungi

Isthmiella is a genus of fungi within the Rhytismataceae family. The genus contains four species.
