= Vladracula =

Scientific classification
- Kingdom: Fungi
- Division: Ascomycota
- Class: Leotiomycetes
- Order: Rhytismatales
- Family: Rhytismataceae
- Genus: Vladracula; P.F.Cannon, Minter, & Kamal

Type species
- Vladracula annuliformis (Syd., P. Syd. & E.J.Butler) P.F. Cannon, Minter, & Kamal

Species
- Vladracula almoreum; Vladracula annuliformis

Genus of fungi

Vladracula is a genus of fungi within the Rhytismataceae family.

This parasitic genus is named after Vlad the Impaler, as the Wallachian nobleman is credited as the inspiration for the titular vampire in Bram Stoker's 1897 novel Dracula.
