= Discocainia =

Scientific classification
- Kingdom: Fungi
- Division: Ascomycota
- Class: Leotiomycetes
- Order: Rhytismatales
- Family: Rhytismataceae
- Genus: Discocainia; J. Reid & A. Funk

Type species
- Discocainia treleasei (Sacc.) J. Reid & A. Funk

Genus of fungi

Discocainia is a genus of fungi within the Rhytismataceae family. The genus contains three species.
