= Moutoniella =

Scientific classification
- Kingdom: Fungi
- Division: Ascomycota
- Class: Leotiomycetes
- Order: Rhytismatales
- Family: Rhytismataceae
- Genus: Moutoniella; Penz. & Sacc.

Type species
- Moutoniella polita Penz. & Sacc.

Genus of fungi

Moutoniella is a genus of fungi within the Rhytismataceae family. This is a monotypic genus, containing the single species Moutoniella polita.

The genus name of Moutoniella is in honour of Victor Mouton (1875–1901), who was a Belgian botanist (Mycology and Lichenology), who worked in Liege.

The genus was circumscribed by Albert Julius Otto Penzig and Pier Andrea Saccardo in Malpighia vol.15 on page 221 in 1901.
