= Tryblidiopsis =

Scientific classification
- Kingdom: Fungi
- Division: Ascomycota
- Class: Leotiomycetes
- Order: Rhytismatales
- Family: Rhytismataceae
- Genus: Tryblidiopsis; P. Karst.

Type species
- Tryblidiopsis pinastri (Pers.) P. Karst.

Species
- T. arendholzii T. caespitosum T. occidentalis T. pinastri

Genus of fungi

Tryblidiopsis (orth. var. Triblidiopsis) is a genus of fungi within the Rhytismataceae family.
