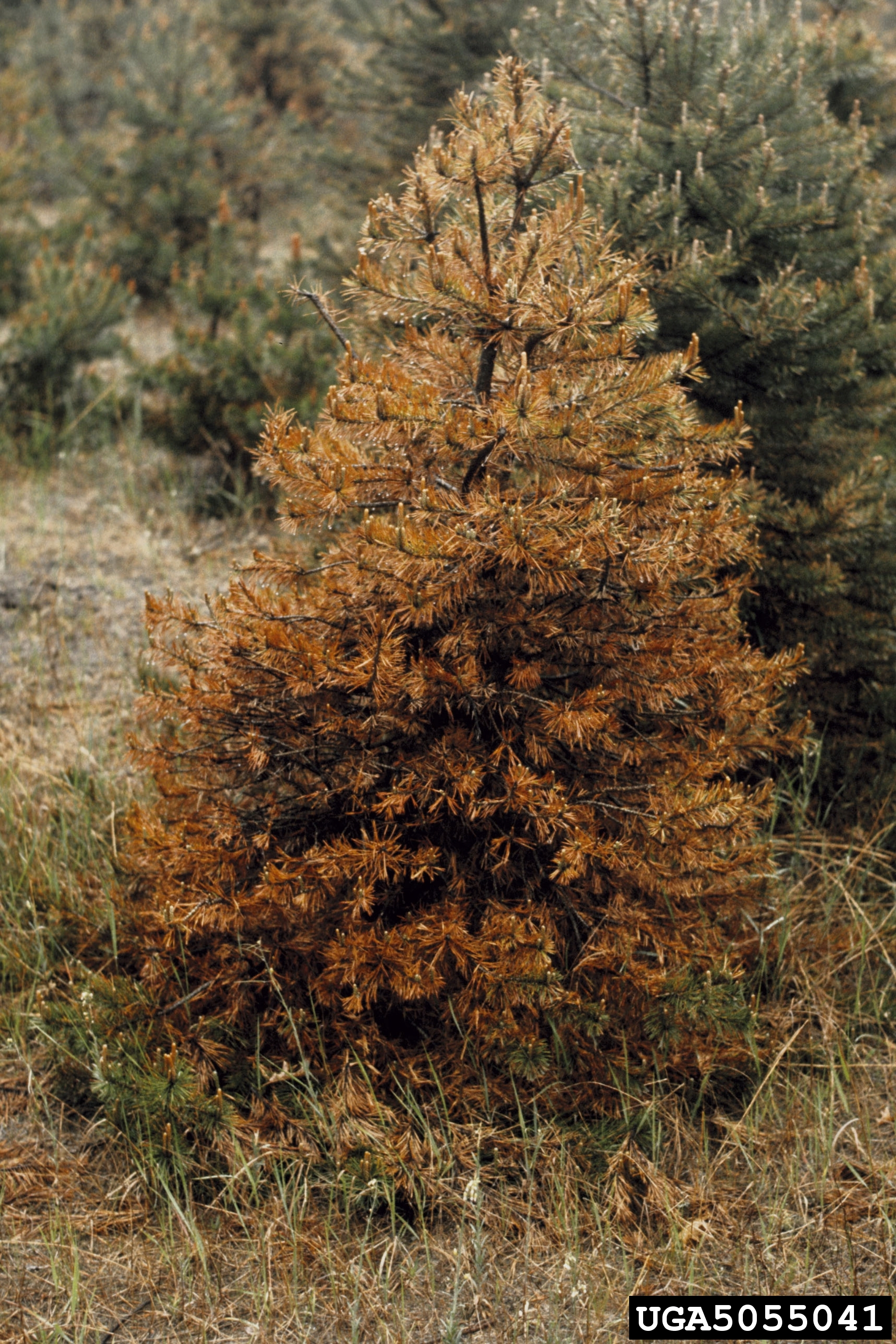
- Tree infected by Lophodermium seditosum

Scientific classification
- Kingdom: Fungi
- Division: Ascomycota
- Class: Leotiomycetes
- Order: Rhytismatales
- Family: Rhytismataceae
- Genus: Lophodermium
- Species: L. seditiosum

Binomial name
- Lophodermium seditiosum Minter, Staley & Millar

= Lophodermium seditiosum =

Species of fungus

Lophodermium seditiosum is a plant pathogen which infects pine trees.
