= Hypodermella =

Scientific classification
- Kingdom: Fungi
- Division: Ascomycota
- Class: Leotiomycetes
- Order: Rhytismatales
- Family: Rhytismataceae
- Genus: Hypodermella; Tubeuf

Type species
- Hypodermella laricis Tubeuf

Genus of fungi

Hypodermella is a genus of fungi within the Rhytismataceae family. The genus contains three species.
