= Tridens =

Tridens is the scientific name for several genera of organisms and may refer to:

- Tridens (fish), Eigenmann & Eigenmann, 1889 a genus of catfish in the family Trichomycteridae
- Tridens (fungus) Massee, 1901, a genus of fungi in the order Rhytismatales
- Tridens (plant) Roem. & Schult., 1817, a genus of grasses in the family Poaceae

== See also ==
- Asellia tridens, the trident bat
