= Nothorhytisma =

Scientific classification
- Kingdom: Fungi
- Division: Ascomycota
- Class: Leotiomycetes
- Order: Rhytismatales
- Family: Rhytismataceae
- Genus: Nothorhytisma; Minter, P.F. Cannon, A.I. Romero & Peredo

Type species
- Nothorhytisma nahuelitae Minter, P.F. Cannon, A.I. Romero & Peredo

Genus of fungi

Nothorhytisma is a genus of fungi within the Rhytismataceae family. This is a monotypic genus, containing the single species Nothorhytisma nahuelitae.
