= Criella =

Scientific classification
- Kingdom: Fungi
- Division: Ascomycota
- Class: Leotiomycetes
- Order: Rhytismatales
- Family: Rhytismataceae
- Genus: Criella (Sacc.) Sacc. & P. Syd.

Type species
- Criella austrocaledonica (Crié) Sacc. & P. Syd.

Species
- C. aceris-laurini C. austrocaledonica C. erythrospora C. lonicerae

Genus of fungi

Criella is a genus of fungi within the Rhytismataceae family.
