= Lophodermella =

Scientific classification
- Kingdom: Fungi
- Division: Ascomycota
- Class: Leotiomycetes
- Order: Rhytismatales
- Family: Rhytismataceae
- Genus: Lophodermella; Höhn. (1917)

Type species
- Lophodermella sulcigena (Link) Tubeuf (1917)

Genus of fungi

Lophodermella is a genus of fungi in the family Rhytismataceae. The genus contains nine species.

== Taxonomy ==
Lophodermella was circumscribed by the Austrian mycologist Franz Xaver Rudolf von Höhnel in 1917, with Lophodermella sulcigena assigned as the type species.

== Species ==
Nine species are accepted in Lophodermella:

- Lophodermella arcuata (Darker) Darker (1967)
- Lophodermella cerina (Darker) Darker (1967)
- Lophodermella concolor (Dearn.) Darker (1967)
- Lophodermella conjuncta (Darker) Darker (1967)
- Lophodermella maureri Minter & Cibrián (1986)
- Lophodermella montivaga Petr. (1922)
- Lophodermella morbida Staley & Bynum (1972)
- Lophodermella orientalis Minter & M.H.Ivory (1988)
- Lophodermella sulcigena (Link) Höhn. (1917)
