= Davisomycella =

Scientific classification
- Kingdom: Fungi
- Division: Ascomycota
- Class: Leotiomycetes
- Order: Rhytismatales
- Family: Rhytismataceae
- Genus: Davisomycella; Darker

Type species
- Davisomycella ampla (Davis) Darker

Genus of fungi

Davisomycella is a genus of fungi within the Rhytismataceae family. The genus contains 10 species.
