= Bifusella =

Scientific classification
- Kingdom: Fungi
- Division: Ascomycota
- Class: Leotiomycetes
- Order: Rhytismatales
- Family: Rhytismataceae
- Genus: Bifusella; Höhn.

Type species
- Bifusella linearis (Peck) Höhn.

Genus of fungi

Bifusella is a genus of fungi within the Rhytismataceae family. The genus contains 10 species.
