= Neococcomyces =

Scientific classification
- Kingdom: Fungi
- Division: Ascomycota
- Class: Leotiomycetes
- Order: Rhytismatales
- Family: Rhytismataceae
- Genus: Neococcomyces; Y.R. Lin, C.T. Xiang & Z.Z. Li

Type species
- Neococcomyces rhododendri Y.R. Lin, C.T. Xiang & Z.Z. Li

Species
- N. erumpens N. rhododendri N. yunnanensis

Genus of fungi

Neococcomyces is a genus of fungi within the Rhytismataceae family.
