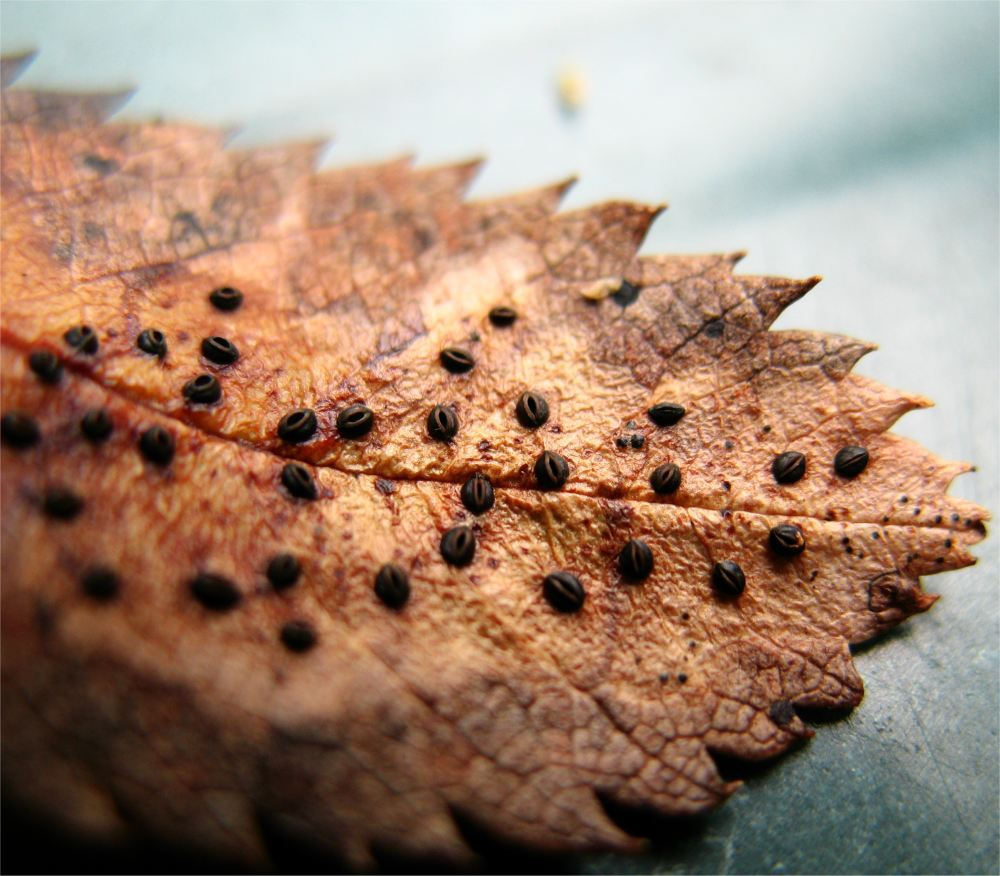
- Lophodermium aucupariae

Scientific classification
- Domain: Eukaryota
- Kingdom: Fungi
- Division: Ascomycota
- Class: Leotiomycetes
- Order: Rhytismatales
- Family: Rhytismataceae
- Genus: Lophodermium; Chevall.

Type species
- Lophodermium arundinaceum (Schrad.) Chevall.

= Lophodermium =

Genus of fungi

Lophodermium is a genus of fungi within the family Rhytismataceae. The genus contains 145 species and has a global distribution. Species of this genus are usually observed producing zone lines, conidiomata and ascomata on dead fallen leaves, but at least some are known to colonize living leaves. In many cases they then live inside the colonized leaf as a symptomless endobiont, where they are regarded as detritivores utilising dead plant matter. In a few cases they may kill all or part of the leaf prematurely, and there is a substantial literature dealing with those species as plant pathogens. The genus infects many different plant families but with a notable concentration in the family Pinaceae; many Lophodermium species are restricted to a single host genus (or even species), but some, particularly those infecting grasses, may infect several genera. Some are economically important plant pathogens, such as those that cause needlecast disease in European Black Pine, Scots Pine and Red Pine in forestry and christmas tree plantations. In these species, notably L. pinastri and L. seditiosum, the fungal spores disperse and infect the pine needles in late summer, which turn brown by the following spring and then fall off.

== Partial list of species ==
A selection of species is listed below with their principal hosts:

- Lophodermium abietis. Host: Picea (often included in L. piceae)
- Lophodermium apiculatum. Host: Poaceae
- Lophodermium arundinaceum. Host: Poaceae
- Lophodermium aucupariae. Host: Sorbus
- Lophodermium australe. Host: Pinus
- Lophodermium autumnale. Host: Abies
- Lophodermium baculiferum. Host: Pinus
- Lophodermium caricinum. Host: Carex
- Lophodermium chamaecyparissi. Host: Juniperus
- Lophodermium conigenum. Host: Pinus
- Lophodermium consociatum. Host: Abies
- Lophodermium culmigenum. Host: Poaceae
- Lophodermium decorum. Host: Abies
- Lophodermium durilabrum. Host: Pinus
- Lophodermium exaridum. Host: Pyrola
- Lophodermium festucae. Host: Poaceae
- Lophodermium foliicola. Host: Rosaceae, particularly Crataegus
- Lophodermium gramineum. Host: Poaceae
- Lophodermium herbarum. Host: Convallaria
- Lophodermium hypophyllum. Host: Vaccinium
- Lophodermium hysterioides. Host: Amelanchier
- Lophodermium indianum. Host: Pinus
- Lophodermium intermissum. Host: Andromeda
- Lophodermium juniperinum. Host: Juniperus
- Lophodermium lacerum. Host: Abies
- Lophodermium laricinum. Host: Larix
- Lophodermium macci. Host: Pinus subgenus Strobus
- Lophodermium maculare. Hosts: Arctostaphylos, Vaccinium
- Lophodermium melaleucum. Host: Vaccinium
- Lophodermium molitoris. Host: Pinus
- Lophodermium nanakii. Host: Picea
- Lophodermium nitens. Host: Pinus
- Lophodermium oxycocci. Host: Vaccinium
- Lophodermium paeoniae. Hosts: Paeonia
- Lophodermium petiolicola. Hosts: Castanea, Quercus
- Lophodermium piceae. Host: Abies (L. abietis often considered synonymous)
- Lophodermium pinastri Hosts: Larix, Pinus
- Lophodermium pini-excelsae Host: Pinus subgenus Strobus
- Lophodermium pini-mugonis Host: Pinus mugo
- Lophodermium pyrolae. Host: Pyrola
- Lophodermium rubicola. Host: Rubus
- Lophodermium schweinitzii. Hosts: Gaultheria, Rhododendron
- Lophodermium seditiosum Host: Pinus
- Lophodermium sphaerioides. Host: Rhododendron
- Lophodermium thuyae. Host: Thuja
- Lophodermium typhinum. Host: Typha
- Lophodermium uncinatum. Host: Abies
