= Xyloschizon =

Scientific classification
- Kingdom: Fungi
- Division: Ascomycota
- Class: Leotiomycetes
- Order: Rhytismatales
- Family: Rhytismataceae
- Genus: Xyloschizon; Syd.

Type species
- Xyloschizon weirianum Syd.

Genus of fungi

Xyloschizon is a genus of fungi within the Rhytismataceae family. The genus contains two species.

.
