= Hypohelion =

Scientific classification
- Kingdom: Fungi
- Division: Ascomycota
- Class: Leotiomycetes
- Order: Rhytismatales
- Family: Rhytismataceae
- Genus: Hypohelion; P.R. Johnst.

Type species
- Hypohelion scirpinum (DC.) P.R. Johnst.

Genus of fungi

Hypohelion is a genus of fungi within the Rhytismataceae family. The genus contains two species.
