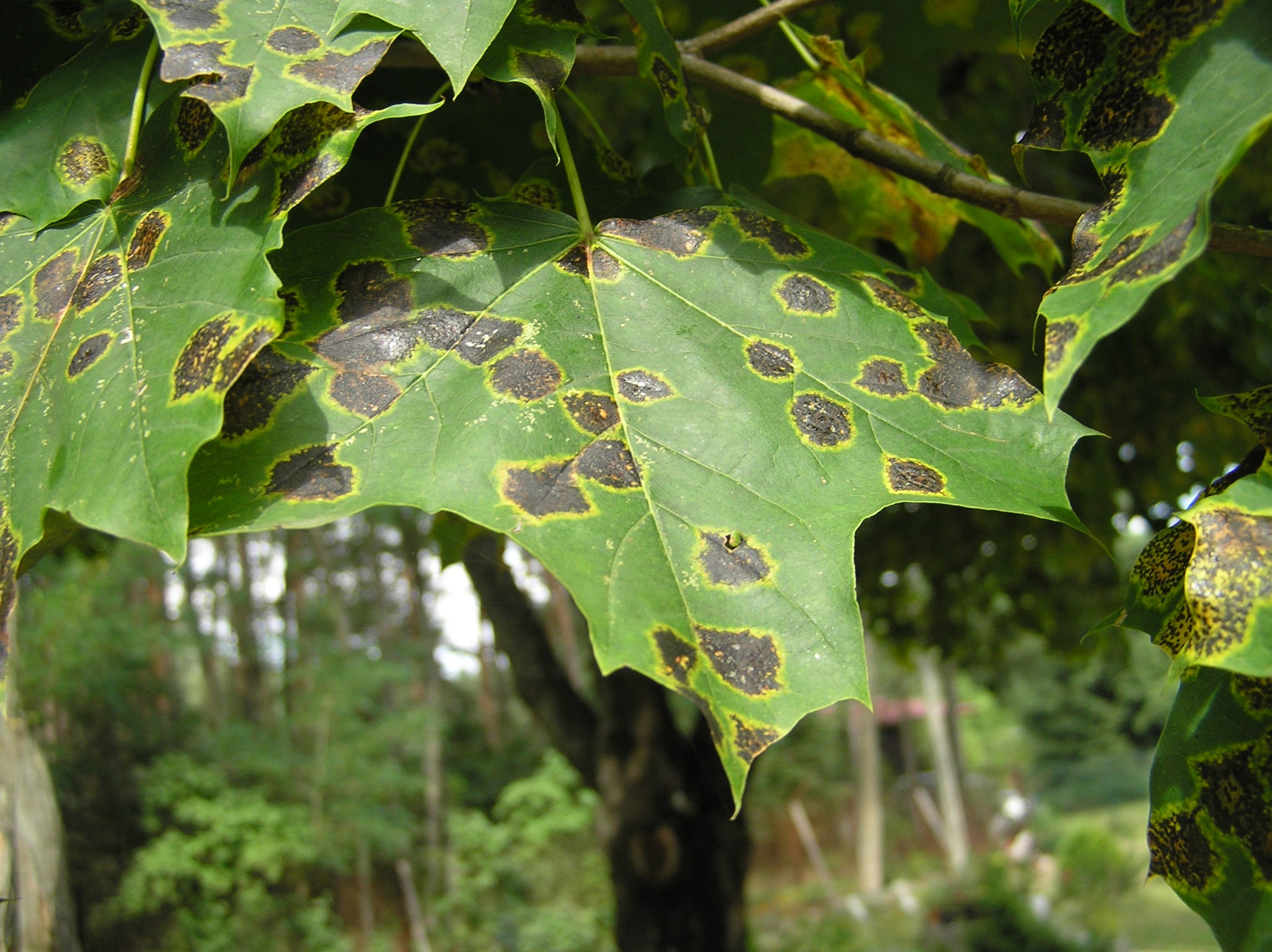
- Rhytisma acerinum

Scientific classification
- Domain: Eukaryota
- Kingdom: Fungi
- Division: Ascomycota
- Class: Leotiomycetes
- Order: Rhytismatales
- Family: Rhytismataceae
- Genus: Rhytisma; Fr. (1818)

Type species
- Rhytisma acerinum (Pers.) Fr. (1818)

= Rhytisma (fungus) =

Genus of fungi

Rhytisma is a genus of fungi in the Rhytismataceae family commonly known as 'tar spot'. There are about 18 species, which live parasitically in the leaves of deciduous trees.

== Species ==
- Rhytisma acerinum
- Rhytisma americanum
- Rhytisma andromedae
- Rhytisma anhuiense
- Rhytisma asteris
- Rhytisma decolorans
- Rhytisma eucalypti
- Rhytisma himalense
- Rhytisma huangshanense
- Rhytisma ilicis-canadensis
- Rhytisma ilicis-integrae
- Rhytisma ilicis-latifoliae
- Rhytisma ilicis-pedunculosae
- Rhytisma itatiaiae
- Rhytisma lagerstroemiae
- Rhytisma panamense
- Rhytisma prini
- Rhytisma priscum
- Rhytisma punctatum
- Rhytisma salicinum
- Rhytisma ulmi
- Rhytisma umbonatum
- Rhytisma velatum
- Rhytisma vitis
- Rhytisma yuexiense
