= Pureke =

Scientific classification
- Kingdom: Fungi
- Division: Ascomycota
- Class: Leotiomycetes
- Order: Rhytismatales
- Family: Rhytismataceae
- Genus: Pureke; P.R. Johnston

Type species
- Pureke zelandicum P.R. Johnst.

Genus of fungi

Pureke is a genus of fungi within the Rhytismataceae family. This is a monotypic genus, containing the single species Pureke zelandicum.
