= Elytroderma =

Scientific classification
- Kingdom: Fungi
- Division: Ascomycota
- Class: Leotiomycetes
- Order: Rhytismatales
- Family: Rhytismataceae
- Genus: Elytroderma; Darker

Type species
- Elytroderma deformans (Weir) Darker

Genus of fungi

Elytroderma is a genus of fungi within the Rhytismataceae family. The genus contains two species.
