= Lophomerum =

Scientific classification
- Kingdom: Fungi
- Division: Ascomycota
- Class: Leotiomycetes
- Order: Rhytismatales
- Family: Rhytismataceae
- Genus: Lophomerum; Quell. & Magasi

Type species
- Lophomerum autumnale (Darker) Magasi

Genus of fungi

Lophomerum is a genus of fungi within the Rhytismataceae family. The genus contains six species.
