= Duplicariella =

Scientific classification
- Kingdom: Fungi
- Division: Ascomycota
- Class: Leotiomycetes
- Order: Rhytismatales
- Family: Rhytismataceae
- Genus: Duplicariella; B. Erikss.

Type species
- Duplicariella phyllodoces B. Erikss.

Genus of fungi

Duplicariella is a genus of fungi within the Rhytismataceae family. This is a monotypic genus, containing the single species Duplicariella phyllodoces.
