= Meloderma =

Scientific classification
- Kingdom: Fungi
- Division: Ascomycota
- Class: Leotiomycetes
- Order: Rhytismatales
- Family: Rhytismataceae
- Genus: Meloderma; Darker

Type species
- Meloderma desmazieri (Duby) Darker

Genus of fungi

Meloderma is a genus of fungi within the Rhytismataceae family. The genus contains four species.
