= Coccomyces dentatus =

- On a dead Quercus agrifolia leaf

Scientific classification
- Kingdom: Fungi
- Division: Ascomycota
- Class: Leotiomycetes
- Order: Rhytismatales
- Family: Rhytismataceae
- Genus: Coccomyces
- Species: C. dentatus

Binomial name
- Coccomyces dentatus (Kunze & J.C.Schmidt) Sacc. (1877)

Synonyms
- Phacidium dentatum J.C.Schmidt (1817); Lophodermium dentatum (J.C.Schmidt & Kunze) De Not. (1847)

Species of fungus

Coccomyces dentatus is a species of fungus in the family Rhytismataceae. A widespread species, particularly in temperate areas, it colonizes the dead fallen leaves of vascular plants, particularly oak and chestnut. The fungus apothecia, which form in the epidermal layer of the leaf host, resemble dark hexagonal spots scattered on a multi-colored mosaic pattern bounded by thin black lines. When mature, the apothecia open by triangular flaps to release spores. The anamorph form of C. dentatus is Tricladiopsis flagelliformis. Lookalike species can be distinguished by the shape of the apothecia, or by microscopic characteristics.

== Taxonomy ==
The species was first described scientifically as Phacidium dentatum by Johann Karl Schmidt in 1817. Italian botanist Giuseppe De Notaris moved it to Lophodermium in 1847. In 1877, Pier Andrea Saccardo transferred it to Coccomyces, giving it its current name. The variety C. dentatus var. hexagonus, described by Otto Penzig and Saccardo from West Java, Indonesia in 1901, is sometimes applied to western US collections with large six-sided apothecia. However, its status is unclear, as the type is no longer in Saccardo's herbarium at the University of Padua, and Penzig's collection was destroyed during World War II. C. dentatus f. lauri was described by Heinrich Rehm in 1901, for a collection found growing on a species of Lauraceae in Rio Grande do Sul (southern Brazil). According to English botanist Martha Sherwood, who revised the genus Coccomyces in 1980, it is indistinguishable from the main type and should be considered synonymous.

One author regarded C. dentatus as a synonym of Coccomyces coronatus, although later authors have treated them separately. In 1923, Carlos Luigi Spegazzini tentatively reported the presence of C. dentatus on fallen Nothofagus leaves in Tierra del Fuego (southern South America); this species was later identified as a distinct species, C. australis.

In 1982, Enrique Descals described an aquatic hyphomycete Tricladiopsis flagelliformis growing from submerged leaves found in the shoreline of Windermere (Cumbria, England), which he tentatively assigned as the anamorph state of Coccomyces dentatus. The specific epithet flagelliformis (from the Latin flagellum "whip" and forma "shape") refers to the "whip-like" form of the conidium.

== Description ==
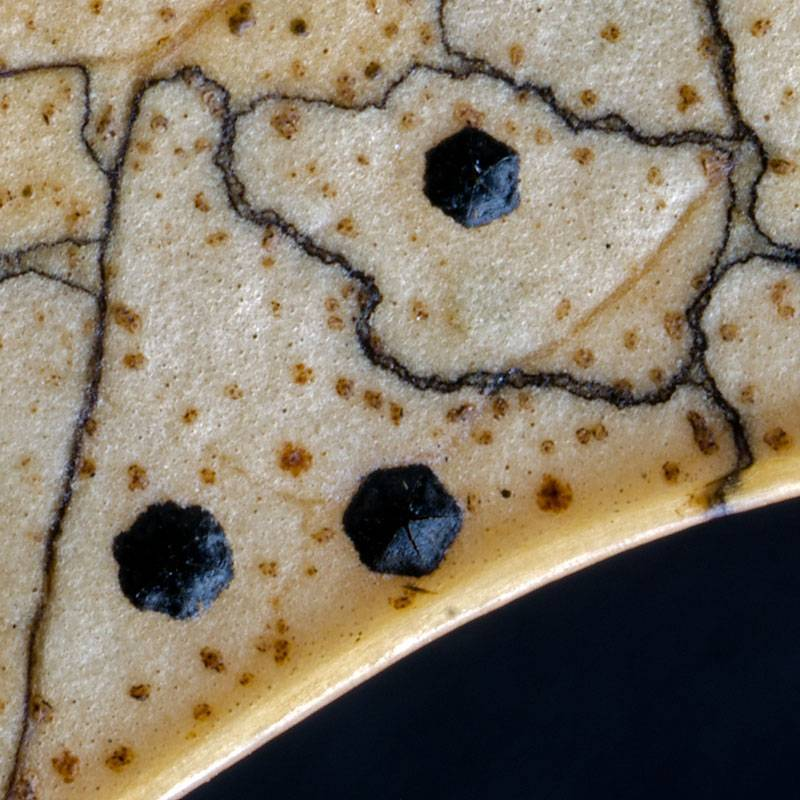
Apothecia closed

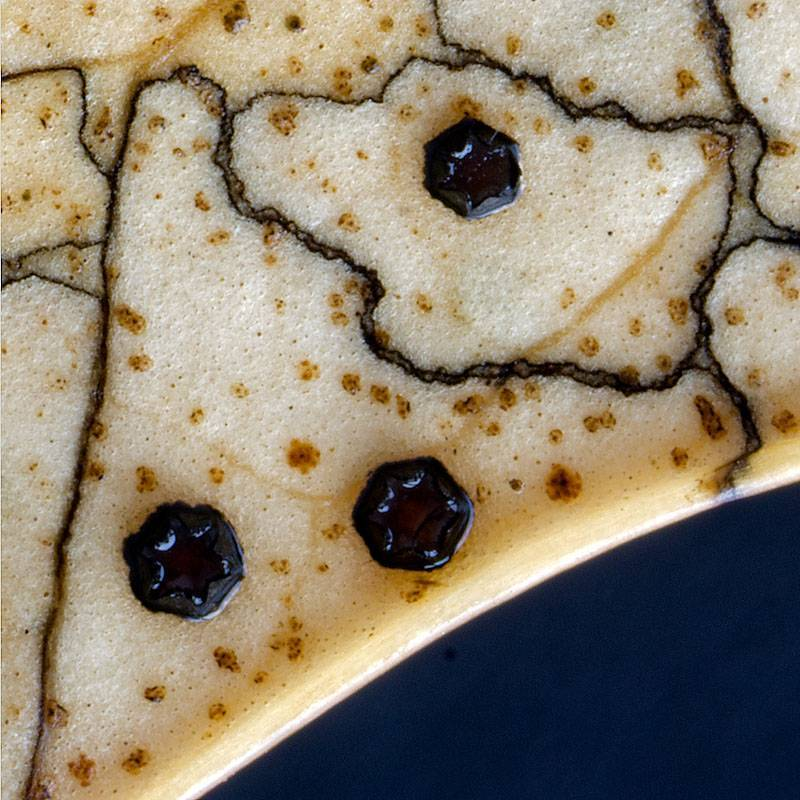
... and open.

The apothecia of Coccomyces dentatus are distributed in bleached spots that are bounded by a black lines inside the outer cell layer of the leaf (intraepidermal). The black lines—often referred to as zone lines—are the result of an antagonistic interactions between individuals of different genotypes that colonize the leaf surface. Apothecia are usually accompanied by pycnidia (asexual fruit bodies) measuring 0.5–1.0 mm in diameter. The apothecia are black, and shiny, with four to six sides. They have a star-shaped pattern of grooves formed by lighter colored cells. When the spores are mature, these open (dehisce) by triangular "teeth" to expose the dull yellow hymenium (spore-bearing surface).

The layer covering the apothecia is about 30 μm thick, and made of blackened (carbonized) cells measuring 5–6 μm in diameter. At the base of the apothecia is carbonized supportive tissue about 5 μm thick. The paraphyses (sterile filamentous hyphal cells) are unbranched, threadlike (filiform), gradually enlarge to a width of 2.0 μm at the tip, and have granular contents. The thin-walled cylindrical to club-shaped asci (spore-bearing cells) are on a short stalk, and measure 70–105 by 8–10 μm; each ascus contains eight ascospores. Ascospores, which measure 45–65 by 3.0 μm, have a thin but distinct sheath, and lack septa (cross-walls). Pycnidia (which appear before the apothecia mature) are intraepidermal, lenticular (having the shape of a double-convex lens) in cross section, 0.1–0.3 mm in diameter, and covered with a dark brown layer of cells. The phialides are arranged in a basal layer, and borne on short conidiophores. They are slender and subulate (tapering to a point), lack a collarette, and measure 5–10 by 2–2.5 μm. The conidia are colorless, rod-shaped, lack septa, and have dimensions of 4–5 by 1.0 μm.

The putative anamorph form of C. dentatus has been described as Tricladiopsis flagelliformis. Grown on 2% malt agar at standard conditions, it forms black-centered colonies that have a growth rate of 7 cm per week. The conidia produced are thin and curved with a whip-like shape. They have 13–20 septa, measure 65–135 by 2–3.5 μm, and usually have a single branch (typically about 45 μm long) that appears before cells are released.

There are only a few species of Rhytismatales known to have anamorphs that do not function as spermatia (non-motile cells that function as a male gamete). Coccomyces dentatus is one of only two species that are known to have both a spermatial and a non-spermatial state (the other is Ascodichaena rugosa).

=== Similar species ===
The species is frequently confused with Coccomyces coronatus, which has inflated paraphyses, longer asci and ascospores, less regularly shaped apothecia, and rarely occurs on leaves of evergreens. It prefers to grow on well-rotted leaves, and is found predominantly in northern Europe and eastern North America. C. tumidus is somewhat similar in appearance, but distinguished in the field by round to ellipsoid apothecia. C. australis has circinate (rolled up with the tip in the center) rather than filiform paraphyses, larger asci and somewhat larger ascospores (150–180 by 14–16.5 μm and 60–75 by 2.5–3 μm, respectively). Another lookalike species that is morphological quite similar to C. dentatus is C. kinabaluensis, found in the Malaysian state of Sabah. However, the latter can be distinguished by the following characters: three- to four-sided ascocarps; ascospores with a single septum; and longer, wider asci measuring 110–135 by 10–14 μm.

== Habitat and distribution ==
Coccomyces dentatus is a saprobic species, and grows on dead leaves of a wide variety of angiosperms. It is frequently encountered on members of the heather (family Ericaceae), and the beech family (Fagaceae), such as oak (red, white, and live oak) and chestnut, and also on the Castanea sativa from Chile. Other common substrates include leaves of trees in the genera Rhododendron, Lithocarpus, Berberis, Arbutus, Gaultheria, and Myrica.

Widely distributed and common, the fungus occurs predominantly in warm temperate areas. It has been found in Africa (Tunisia), Europe, and the Americas. In the northern part of its range, it occurs in the summer and autumn, but in subtropical areas it can be found year-round. Because of its wide geographical distribution, abundance, and conspicuousness, Coccomyces dentatus is the most often collected species of Coccomyces.
