= Duplicaria =

Duplicaria may refer to:

- Duplicaria (gastropod), a genus of snails in the family Terebridae
- Duplicaria (fungus), a genus of fungi in the family Rhytismataceae
