= Hypoderma =

Hypoderma may refer to:

- Hypoderma (fly), a fly genus in the subfamily Hypodermatinae
- Hypoderma (fungus), a genus of fungi in the family Rhytismataceae
