= Nematococcomyces =

Scientific classification
- Kingdom: Fungi
- Division: Ascomycota
- Class: Leotiomycetes
- Order: Rhytismatales
- Family: Rhytismataceae
- Genus: Nematococcomyces; C.-L. Hou, M. Piepenbr. & Oberw.

Type species
- Nematococcomyces rhododendri C.L. Hou, M. Piepenbr. & Oberw.

Genus of fungi

Nematococcomyces is a genus of fungi within the Rhytismataceae family. It is a monotypic genus, containing the single species Nematococcomyces rhododendri.
