= Melittosporiella =

Scientific classification
- Kingdom: Fungi
- Division: Ascomycota
- Class: Leotiomycetes
- Order: Rhytismatales
- Genus: Melittosporiella; Höhn

Type species
- Mellitiosporiella pulchella Höhn.

Genus of fungi

Melittosporiella is a genus of fungi in the Rhytismatales order. The relationship of this taxon to other taxa within the order is unknown (incertae sedis), and it has not yet been placed with certainty into any family.
