= Bonanseja =

Scientific classification
- Kingdom: Fungi
- Division: Ascomycota
- Class: Leotiomycetes
- Order: Rhytismatales
- Genus: Bonanseja; Sacc.

Type species
- Bonanseja mexicana Sacc.

Genus of fungi

Bonanseja is a genus of fungi in the Rhytismatales order. Its relationship to other taxa within the order is unknown (incertae sedis), and it has not yet been placed with certainty into any family. It is a monotypic genus, containing the single species Bonanseja mexicana.
