= Cavaraella =

Scientific classification
- Kingdom: Fungi
- Division: Ascomycota
- Class: Leotiomycetes
- Order: Rhytismatales
- Genus: Cavaraella (Berk. & M.A. Curtis) Speg.

Type species
- Cavaraella micraspis (Berk. & M.A. Curtis) Speg.

Genus of fungi

Cavaraella is a genus of fungi in the Rhytismatales order. The relationship of this taxon to other taxa within the order is unknown (incertae sedis), and it has not yet been placed with certainty into any family. This is a monotypic genus, containing the single species Cavaraella micraspis.

The genus name of Cavaraella is in honour of Fridiano Cavara (1857 - 1929), an Italian botanist (Mycology), Professor of Botany and Director at the University of Catania.

The genus was circumscribed by Carlos Luis Spegazzini in Bol. Acad. Nac. Ci. Vol.26 on page 396 in 1923.
