= Mellitiosporium =

Scientific classification
- Kingdom: Fungi
- Division: Ascomycota
- Class: Leotiomycetes
- Order: Rhytismatales
- Genus: Mellitiosporium; Corda

Type species
- Mellitiosporium versicolor Corda

Genus of fungi

Mellitiosporium is a genus of fungi in the Rhytismatales order. The relationship of this taxon to other taxa within the order is unknown (incertae sedis), and it has not yet been placed with certainty into any family.
