= Virgella =

Scientific classification
- Kingdom: Fungi
- Division: Ascomycota
- Class: Leotiomycetes
- Order: Rhytismatales
- Family: Rhytismataceae
- Genus: Virgella; Darker

Type species
- Virgella robusta (Tubeuf) Darker

Genus of fungi

Virgella is a genus of fungi within the Rhytismataceae family. This is a monotypic genus, containing the single species Virgella robusta.
