= Pseudotrochila =

Scientific classification
- Kingdom: Fungi
- Division: Ascomycota
- Class: Leotiomycetes
- Order: Rhytismatales
- Genus: Pseudotrochila; Höhn.

Type species
- Pseudotrochila rhododendri (Racib.) Höhn.

Genus of fungi

Pseudotrochila is a genus of fungi in the Rhytismatales order. The relationship of this taxon to other taxa within the order is unknown (incertae sedis), and it has not yet been placed with certainty into any family. This is a monotypic genus, containing the single species Pseudotrochila rhododendri.
