= Haplophyse =

Scientific classification
- Kingdom: Fungi
- Division: Ascomycota
- Class: Leotiomycetes
- Order: Rhytismatales
- Genus: Haplophyse; Theiss.

Type species
- Haplophyse oahuensis Theiss.

Genus of fungi

Haplophyse is a genus of fungi in the Rhytismatales order. The relationship of this taxon to other taxa within the order is unknown (incertae sedis), and it has not yet been placed with certainty into any family. This is a monotypic genus, containing the single species Haplophyse oahuensis.
