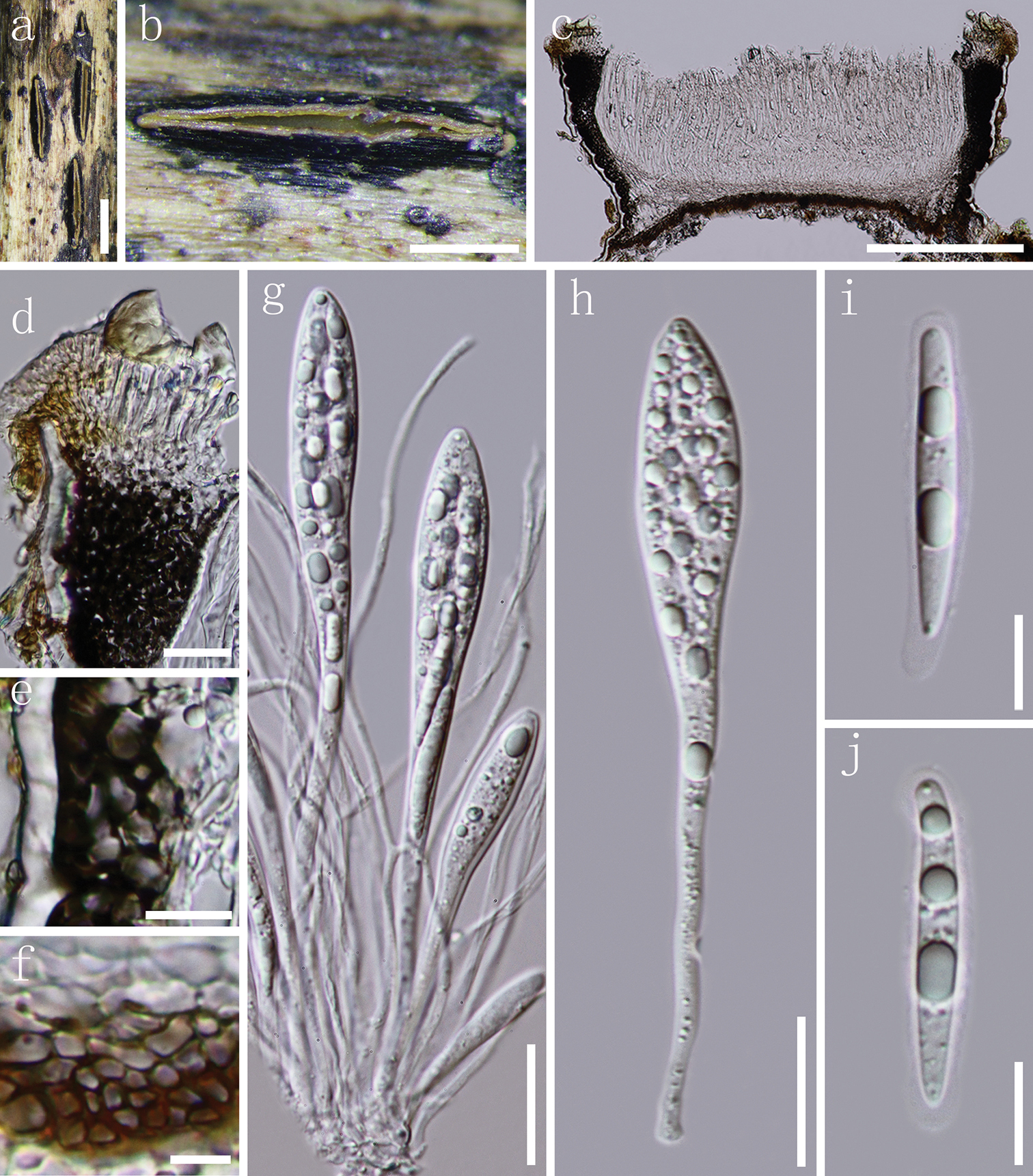
- Hypoderma paralinderae, please click on image for details.

Scientific classification
- Kingdom: Fungi
- Division: Ascomycota
- Class: Leotiomycetes
- Order: Rhytismatales
- Family: Rhytismataceae
- Genus: Hypoderma; De Not. (1847)

Type species
- Hypoderma rubi (Pers.) DC. (1847)

= Hypoderma (fungus) =

Genus of fungi

Hypoderma is a genus of fungi within the family Rhytismataceae. According to a 2008 estimate, the genus contains 54 species.

== Species ==
- H. aceris
- H. alborubrum
- H. alpinum
- H. berberidis
- H. bidwillii
- H. bihospitum
- H. borneense
- H. campanulatum
- H. caricis
- H. carinatum
- H. commune
- H. cookianum
- H. cordylines
- H. corni
- H. cuspidatum
- H. dryadis
- H. dundasicum
- H. eucalypti
- H. ferulae
- H. gaultheriae
- H. handelii
- H. hansbroughii
- H. hederae
- H. ilicinum
- H. junipericola
- H. labiorum-aurantiorum
- H. liliense
- H. linderae
- H. mirabile
- H. obtectum
- H. paralinderae
- H. qinlingense
- H. rhododendri-mariesii
- H. rubi
- H. rufilabrum
- H. shiqii
- H. sigmoideum
- H. smilacicola
- H. stephanandrae
- H. sticheri
- H. tillandsiae
- H. tunicatum
- H. urniforme
