= Neophacidium =

Scientific classification
- Kingdom: Fungi
- Division: Ascomycota
- Class: Leotiomycetes
- Order: Rhytismatales
- Genus: Neophacidium; Petr.

Type species
- Neophacidium macrocarpum (Pat.) Petr.

Genus of fungi

Neophacidium is a genus of fungi in the Rhytismatales order. The relationship of this taxon to other taxa within the order is unknown (incertae sedis), and it has not yet been placed with certainty into any family.
