= Therrya =

Scientific classification
- Kingdom: Fungi
- Division: Ascomycota
- Class: Leotiomycetes
- Order: Rhytismatales
- Family: Rhytismataceae
- Genus: Therrya; Sacc.

Type species
- Therrya gallica Sacc. & Penz.

Genus of fungi

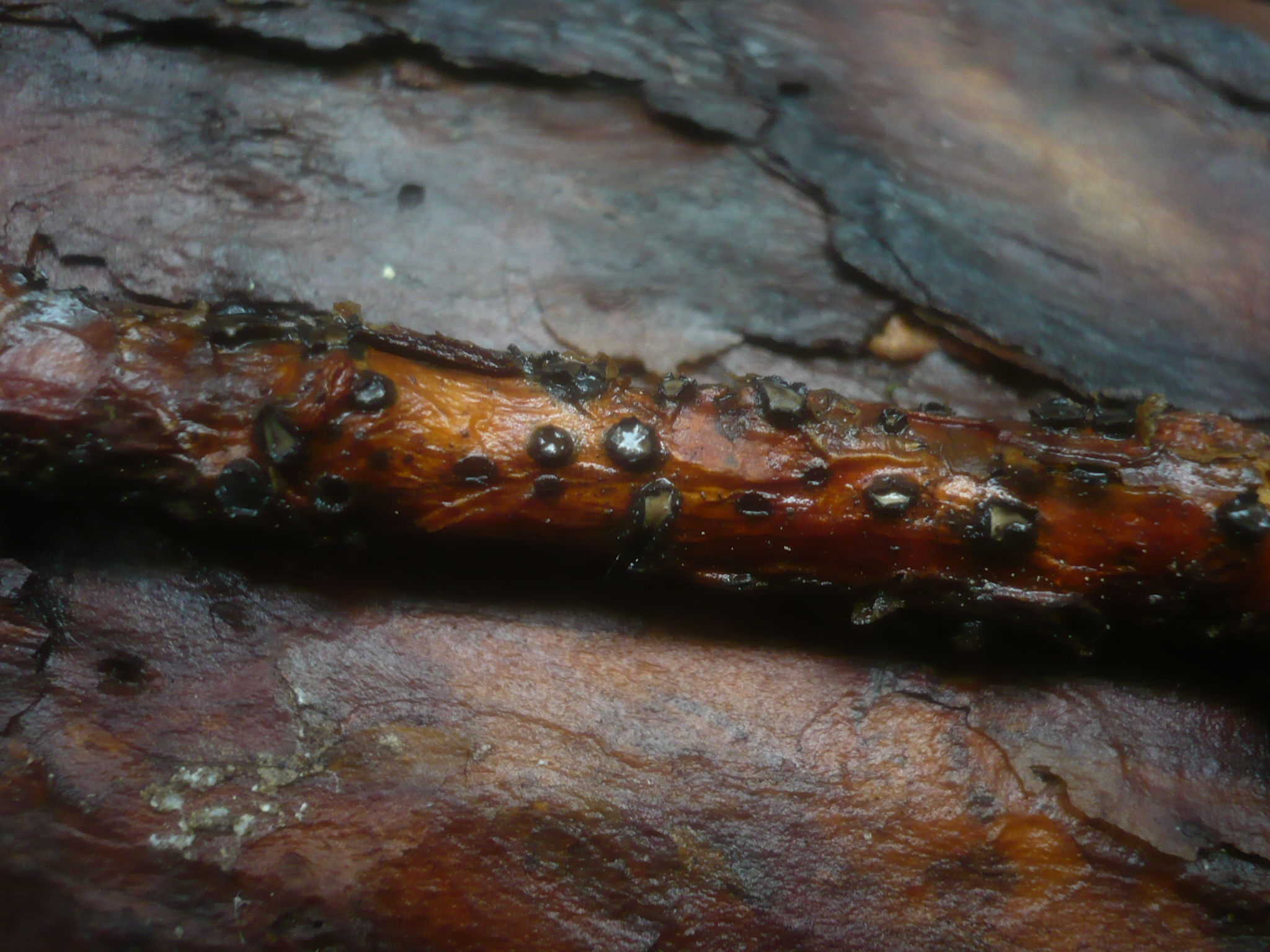
Therrya pini

Therrya is a genus of fungi within the Rhytismataceae family.

The genus was circumscribed by Pier Andrea Saccardo in Michelia vol.2 (8) on page 604 in 1882.

The genus name of Therrya is in honour of Jean Joseph Therry (1833–1888), who was a French merchant and banker. He was also a self-taught botanist (in Mycology and Lichenology).

== Species ==
The genus contains seven species. As accepted by Species Fungorum;

- Therrya abieticola C.L. Hou & M. Piepenbr. (2007)
- Therrya eucalypti Z.Q. Yuan (1997)
- Therrya fuckelii (Rehm) Kujala (1950)
- Therrya piceae A. Funk (1980)
- Therrya pini (Alb. & Schwein.) Höhn. (1917)
- Therrya pseudotsugae A. Funk (1980)
- Therrya tsugae A. Funk (1980)

Former species;

- Therrya cembrae (Rehm) E.K. Cash (1956) = Coccomyces cembrae, Rhytismataceae
- Therrya gallica Sacc. & Penz. (1882) = Therrya pini
- Therrya pini var. mughicola Svrček (1958) = Therrya pini
