= Irydyonia =

Scientific classification
- Kingdom: Fungi
- Division: Ascomycota
- Class: Leotiomycetes
- Order: Rhytismatales
- Genus: Irydyonia; Racib.

Type species
- Irydyonia filicis Racib.

Genus of fungi

Irydyonia is a genus of fungi in the Rhytismatales order. The relationship of this taxon to other taxa within the order is unknown (incertae sedis), and it has not yet been placed with certainty into any family. This is a monotypic genus, containing the single species Irydyonia filicis.
