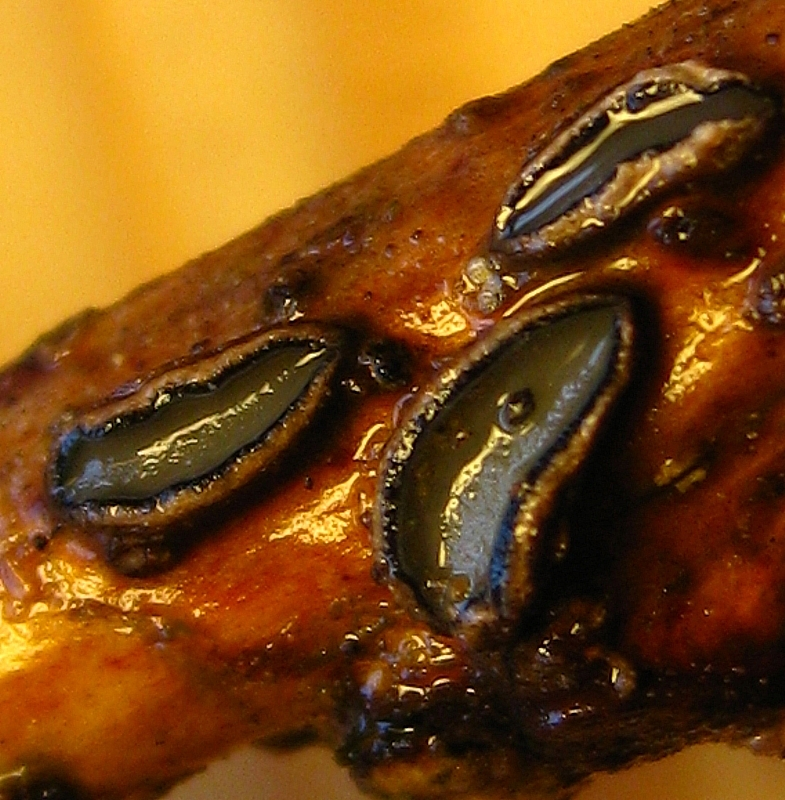
- Colpoma quercinum

Scientific classification
- Kingdom: Fungi
- Division: Ascomycota
- Class: Leotiomycetes
- Order: Rhytismatales
- Family: Rhytismataceae
- Genus: Colpoma; Wallr.

Type species
- Colpoma quercinum (Pers.) Wallr.

= Colpoma =

Genus of fungi

Colpoma is a genus of fungi within the Rhytismataceae family. The genus contains 14 species.

== Ecology and Habitat ==
- Species within the genus are saprophytic or weakly pathogenic and are commonly found in temperate and subtropical regions.
- They play a role in nutrient recycling by decomposing plant material.
- Common hosts include oak (Quercus) and juniper (Juniperus) species.

== Reproduction ==
- Produces spores in asci within elongated ascomata.
- Dispersal of spores occurs via wind or water.

== Research Significance ==
- Studied for its role in forest ecosystems and fungal biodiversity.
- Taxonomic revisions and molecular studies have highlighted its evolutionary placement within Rhytismataceae.
