= Heufleria =

Scientific classification
- Kingdom: Fungi
- Division: Ascomycota
- Class: Leotiomycetes
- Order: Rhytismatales
- Genus: Heufleria; Auersw.

Genus of fungi

Heufleria is a genus of fungi in the Rhytismatales order.

The genus name of Heufleria is in honour of Ludwig Samuel Joseph David Alexander von Heufler (1817–1885), who was an Austrian baron and cryptogamist.

The genus was circumscribed by Vittore Benedetto Antonio Trevisan de Saint-Léon in Spighe Paglie on page 19 in 1853.

The relationship of this taxon to other taxa within the order is unknown (incertae sedis), and it has not yet been placed with certainty into any family.

== Species ==
- Heufleria alpina
- Heufleria chlorogastrica
- Heufleria confluens
- Heufleria consimilis
- Heufleria defossa
- Heufleria diplocarpa
- Heufleria isabellina
- Heufleria megalostoma
- Heufleria octospora
- Heufleria praetervisa
- Heufleria purpurascens
- Heufleria sepulta
- Heufleria subvariata

The GBIF only list 2 species; Heufleria alpina Auersw. and Heufleria diplocarpa Müll.Arg.
