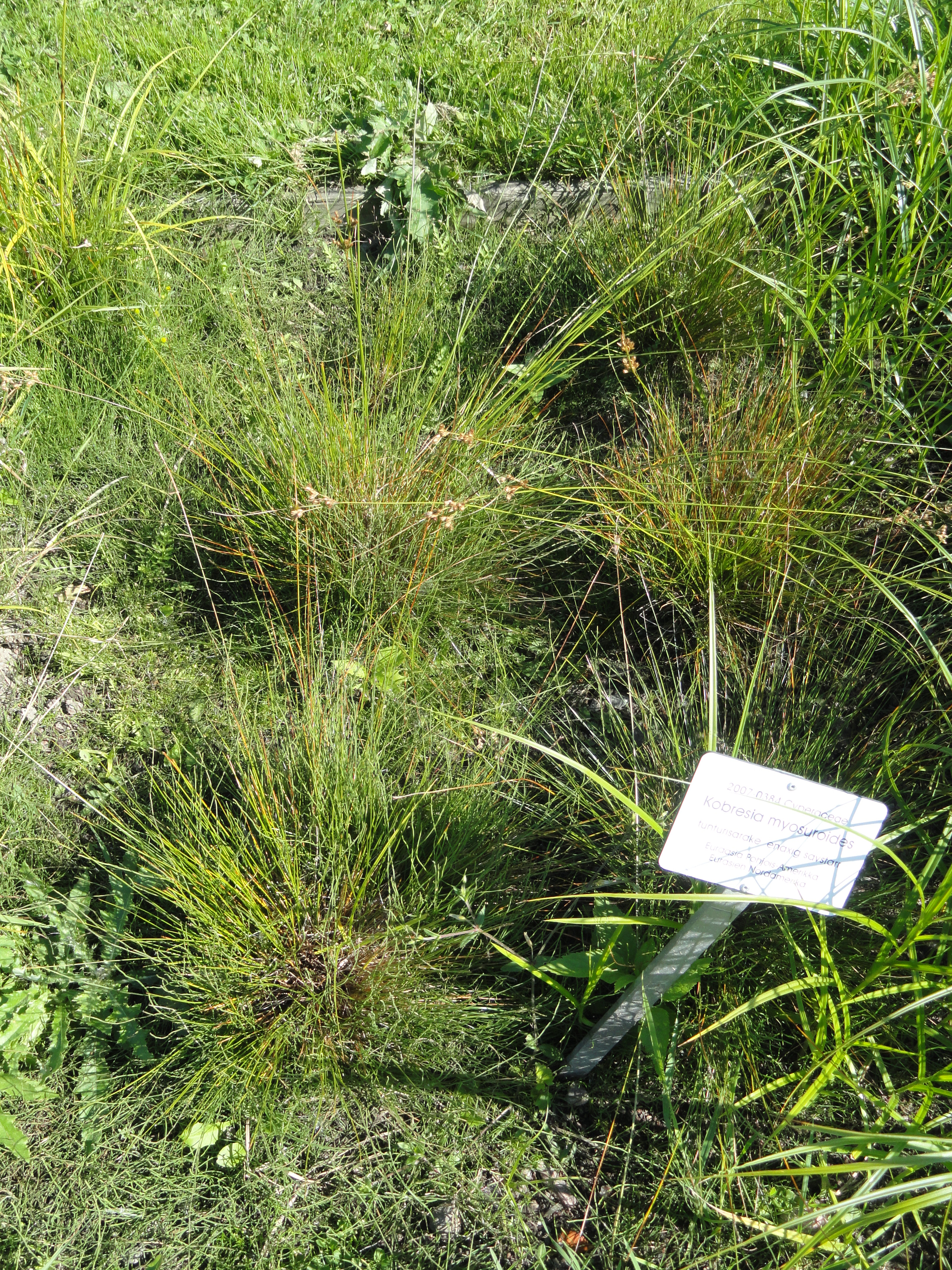
- At the University of Helsinki Botanical Garden, Kaisaniemi
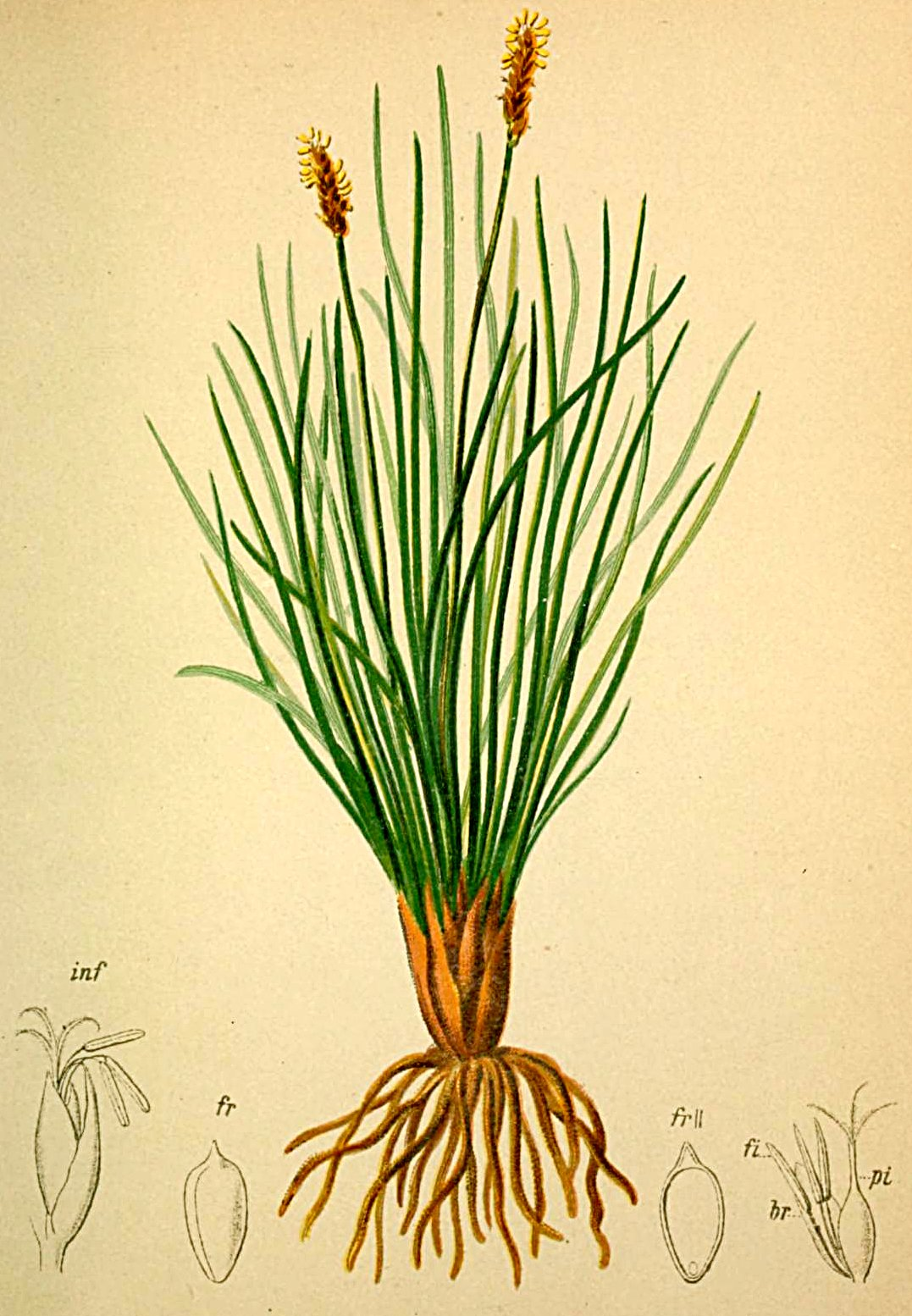
- Botanical illustration

Scientific classification
- Kingdom: Plantae
- Clade: Tracheophytes
- Clade: Angiosperms
- Clade: Monocots
- Clade: Commelinids
- Order: Poales
- Family: Cyperaceae
- Genus: Carex
- Species: C. myosuroides

Binomial name
- Carex myosuroides Vill.

Synonyms
- List: Carex bellardii All.; Carex hermaphrodita J.F.Gmel.; Carex scirpina (Willd.) Missbach & E.H.L.Krause; Carex vulcanicola Nakai; Elyna bellardii (All.) K.Koch; Elyna filiformis Steud.; Elyna myosuroides (Vill.) Fritsch ex Janch.; Elyna scirpina (Willd.) Pax; Elyna spicata Schrad.; Elyna stricta Hoppe ex Steud.; Kobresia filiformis Dewey; Kobresia myosuroides (Vill.) Fiori; Kobresia scirpina Willd.; Scirpus bellardii (All.) Wahlenb.

= Carex myosuroides =

Species of flowering plant

Carex myosuroides (syn. Kobresia myosuroides), the mouse-tail bog sedge, is a species of sedge (family Cyperaceae) with a circumboreal distribution. It is the only known sedge to have ectomycorrhizal associations.

It is a known host to a number of fungi, including Anthracoidea elynae, Arthrinium puccinioides, Cladosporium herbarum, Clathrospora elynae, Lophodermium caricinum, Phaeosphaeria herpotrichoides, Schizonella melanogramma, Septoria punctoidea and possibly to Micropeziza cornea.
