= Laquearia =

Scientific classification
- Kingdom: Fungi
- Division: Ascomycota
- Class: Leotiomycetes
- Order: Rhytismatales
- Genus: Laquearia; Fr.

Type species
- Laquearia sphaeralis (Fr.) Fr.

Genus of fungi

Laquearia is a genus of fungi in the Rhytismatales order. The relationship of this taxon to other taxa within the order is unknown (incertae sedis), and it has not yet been placed with certainty into any family.

It also can mean a paneled ceiling. This is used in literary works such as The Waste Land, and Aeneid.
