= Lasiostictella =

Scientific classification
- Kingdom: Fungi
- Division: Ascomycota
- Class: Leotiomycetes
- Order: Rhytismatales
- Genus: Lasiostictella; Sherwood

Type species
- Lasiostictella bambusae Sherwood

Genus of fungi

Lasiostictella is a genus of fungi in the Rhytismatales order. The relationship of this taxon to other taxa within the order is unknown (incertae sedis), and it has not yet been placed with certainty into any family. This is a monotypic genus, containing the single species Lasiostictella bambusae.
