= Gelineostroma =

Scientific classification
- Kingdom: Fungi
- Division: Ascomycota
- Class: Leotiomycetes
- Order: Rhytismatales
- Genus: Gelineostroma; H.J. Swart

Type species
- Gelineostroma athrotaxis H.J. Swart

Genus of fungi

Gelineostroma is a genus of fungi in the Rhytismatales order. The relationship of this taxon to other taxa within the order is unknown (incertae sedis), and it has not yet been placed with certainty into any family.
