= Phaeophacidium =

Scientific classification
- Kingdom: Fungi
- Division: Ascomycota
- Class: Leotiomycetes
- Order: Rhytismatales
- Genus: Phaeophacidium; P. Henn. & Lindau

Type species
- Phaeophacidium escalloniae Henn. & Lindau

Species
- See text

Genus of fungi

Phaeophacidium is a genus of fungi in the Rhytismatales order. The relationship of this taxon to other taxa within the order is unknown (incertae sedis), and it has not yet been placed with certainty into any family.

== Species ==
The genus includes the following three species:

- Phaeophacidium abietinum
- Phaeophacidium escalloniae
- Phaeophacidium viburni

Naeviella volkartiana was formerly included in this genus under the name Phaeophacidium volkartianum.
