= Duplicaria (fungus) =

Scientific classification
- Kingdom: Fungi
- Division: Ascomycota
- Class: Leotiomycetes
- Order: Rhytismatales
- Family: Rhytismataceae
- Genus: Duplicaria; Fuckel

Type species
- Duplicaria empetri (Pers.) Fuckel

Genus of fungi

Duplicaria is a genus of fungi within the Rhytismataceae family. The genus contains three species.
