= Cerion (fungus) =

Scientific classification
- Kingdom: Fungi
- Division: Ascomycota
- Class: Leotiomycetes
- Order: Rhytismatales
- Family: Rhytismataceae
- Genus: Cerion; Massee

Type species
- Cerion coccineum Massee & Rodway

Genus of fungi

Cerion is a genus of fungi within the Rhytismataceae family. The genus contains two species.
