= Tridens (fungus) =

Scientific classification
- Kingdom: Fungi
- Division: Ascomycota
- Class: Leotiomycetes
- Order: Rhytismatales
- Family: incertae sedis
- Genus: Tridens; Massee

Genus of fungi

Tridens is a genus of fungi in the order Rhytismatales. The relationship of this taxon to other taxa within the order is unknown (incertae sedis), and it has not yet been placed with certainty into any family.
