= Vriesea robusta =

Conservation status
- Least Concern (IUCN 3.1)

Scientific classification
- Kingdom: Plantae
- Clade: Tracheophytes
- Clade: Angiosperms
- Clade: Monocots
- Clade: Commelinids
- Order: Poales
- Family: Bromeliaceae
- Genus: Vriesea
- Species: V. robusta

Binomial name
- Vriesea robusta (Griseb.) L.B.Sm.

Synonyms
- Tillandsia robusta Griseb.; Vriesea chlorantha L.B.Sm.

Species of flowering plant

Vriesea robusta is a species of flowering plant in the family Bromeliaceae. This species is native to Venezuela.
