= Ocotomyces =

Scientific classification
- Kingdom: Fungi
- Division: Ascomycota
- Class: Leotiomycetes
- Order: Rhytismatales
- Genus: Ocotomyces; H.C. Evans & Minter

Type species
- Ocotomyces parasiticus H.C. Evans & Minter

Genus of fungi

Ocotomyces is a genus of fungi in the Rhytismatales order. The relationship of this taxon to other taxa within the order is unknown (incertae sedis), and it has not yet been placed with certainty into any family. This is a monotypic genus, containing the single species Ocotomyces parasiticus.
