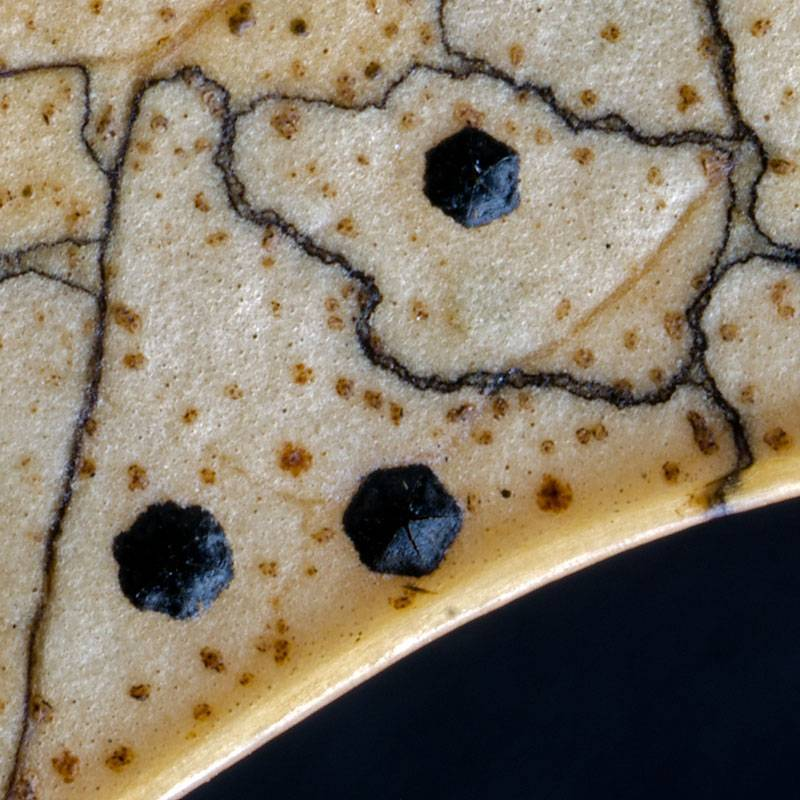
- Coccomyces dentatus

Scientific classification
- Kingdom: Fungi
- Division: Ascomycota
- Class: Leotiomycetes
- Order: Rhytismatales
- Family: Rhytismataceae
- Genus: Coccomyces; De Not. (1847)

Type species
- Coccomyces coronatus (Schumach.) De Not. (1859)

Synonyms
- Coccomycella Höhn. (1917); Malenconia Bat. & H.Maia (1960)

= Coccomyces =

Genus of fungi

Coccomyces is a genus of ascomycete fungi in the family Rhytismataceae.

The ascocarps of Coccomyces species form within the epidermal layer of a plant host. Many species are foliicolous, meaning they grow on leaves.

In the Pacific Northwest, common hosts for Coccomyces species are plants in the family Ericaceae.

== Species ==
This genus includes, but is not limited to the following species:

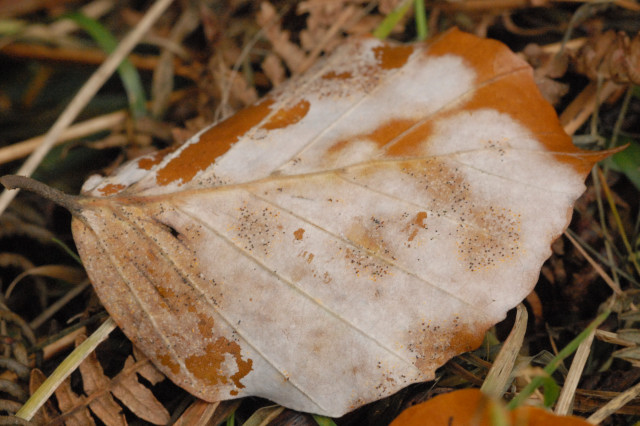
Coccomyces coronatus

- Coccomyces clavatus
- Coccomyces dentatus
- Coccomyces neolitseae – China
- Coccomyces prominens – China

== Habitat and ecology ==
Coccomyces are often found in places with dry climates, or in microclimates that do not experience frequent alternate wetting and drying. The majority of species fruit on recently dead plant material.

Most species exhibit host specificity, however the preference is moreso related to leaf texture and ecology than to the taxonomy of the host itself. Coccomyces are unusual in the Rhytismataceae in that they are relatively rare on monocotyledons. Three species have been described on conifer needles.
