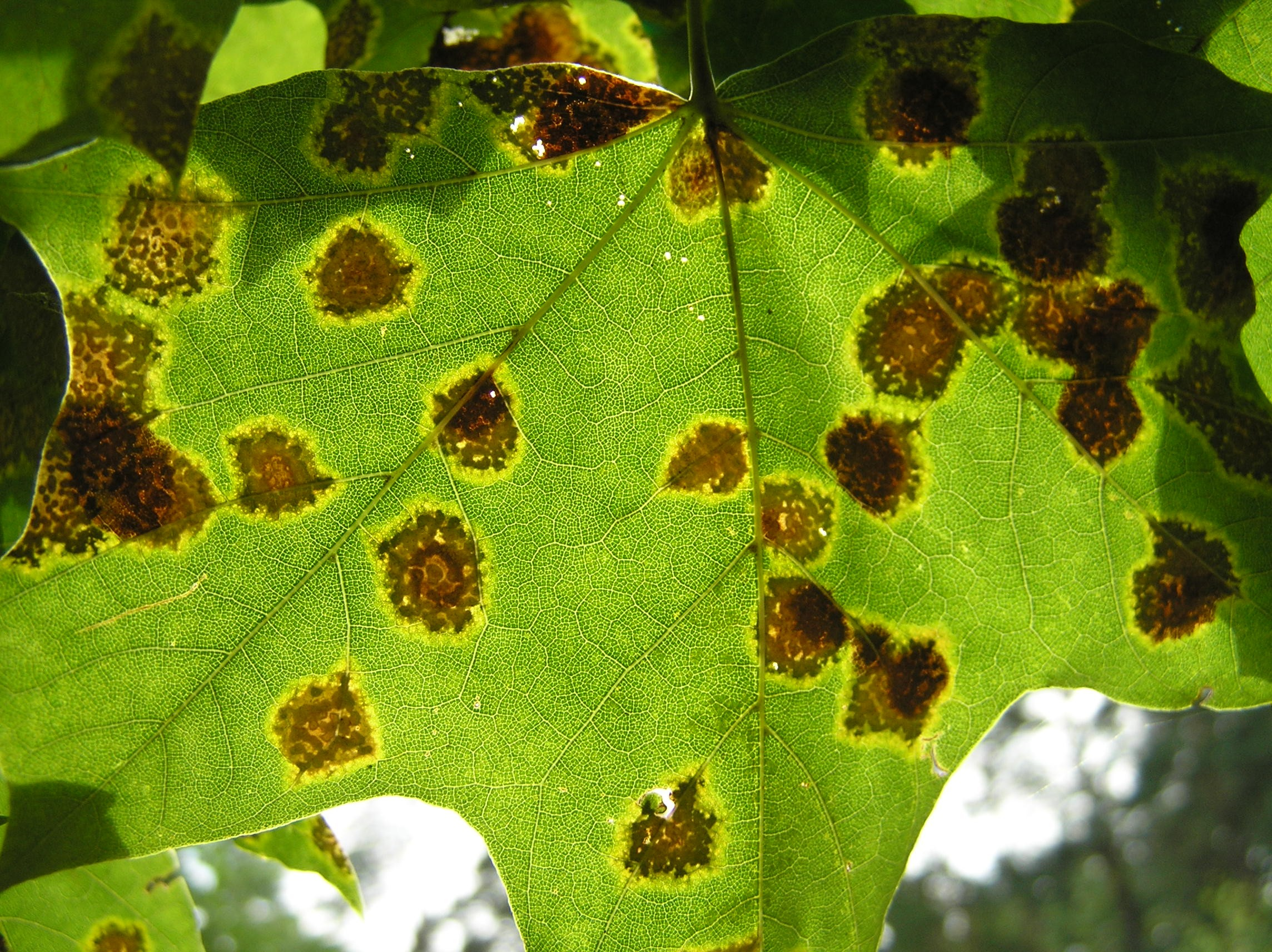
- Rhytisma acerinum

Scientific classification
- Kingdom: Fungi
- Division: Ascomycota
- Class: Leotiomycetes
- Order: Rhytismatales
- Family: Rhytismataceae; Chevall. (1826)

Type genus
- Rhytisma Fr.

= Rhytismataceae =

Family of fungi

The Rhytismataceae are a family of fungi in the Rhytismatales order. It contains 55 genera and 728 species.

== Genera ==
According to the 2007 Outline of Ascomycota, the following genera are in the Rhytismataceae. The placement of the genus Nymanomyces is uncertain.

Bifusella — Bifusepta — Bivallium — Canavirgella — Ceratophacidium — Cerion — Coccomyces — Colpoma — Criella — Davisomycella — Discocainia — Duplicaria — Duplicariella — Elytroderma — Hypoderma — Hypodermella — Hypohelion — Isthmiella — Lirula — Lophodermella — Lophodermium — Lophomerum — Marthamyces — Meloderma — Moutoniella — Myriophacidium — Nematococcomyces — Neococcomyces — Nothorhytisma — Nymanomyces — Parvacoccum — Ploioderma — Propolis — Pureke — Rhytisma — Soleella — Sporomega — Terriera — Therrya — Triblidiopsis — Virgella — Vladracula — Xyloschizon — Zeus
