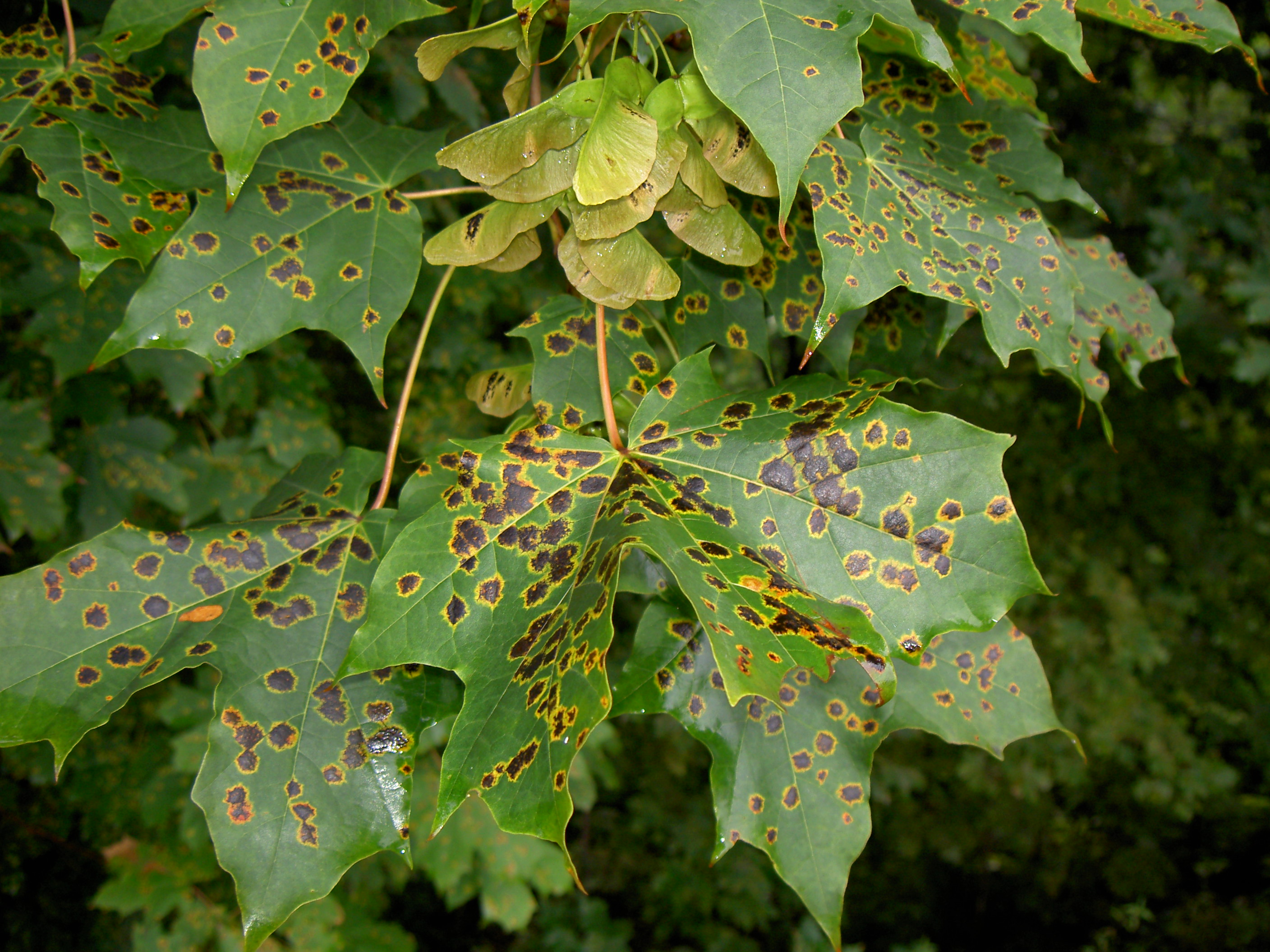
- Rhytisma acerinum

Scientific classification
- Kingdom: Fungi
- Division: Ascomycota
- Class: Leotiomycetes
- Order: Rhytismatales; M.E. Barr ex Minter

Families
- Ascodichaenaceae; Cryptomycetaceae; Cudoniaceae; Rhytismataceae

= Rhytismatales =

Order of fungi

The Rhytismatales are an order of the class Leotiomycetes within the phylum Ascomycota.

== Genera incertae sedis ==
The following genera within the Rhytismatales have not been placed with any certainty into a family (incertae sedis). For those genera with a question mark preceding the name, their placement in this order is tentative.

- Apiodiscus
- Bonanseja
- Brunaudia
- Cavaraella
- Didymascus
- Gelineostroma
- Haplophyse
- Heufleria
- Hypodermellina
- Irydyonia
- Karstenia
- Laquearia
- Lasiostictella
- Melittosporiella
- Mellitiosporium
- Metadothis
- Neophacidium
- Ocotomyces
- Phaeophacidium
- Propolidium
- Pseudotrochila
- Tridens
