= Llimoniella =

Scientific classification
- Kingdom: Fungi
- Division: Ascomycota
- Class: Leotiomycetes
- Order: Cyttariales
- Family: Cordieritidaceae
- Genus: Llimoniella; Hafellner & Nav.-Ros. (1993)

Type species
- Llimoniella scabridula (Müll.Arg.) Nav.-Ros. & Hafellner (1993)

Species
- See text

Genus of fungi

Llimoniella is a genus of lichenicolous (lichen-dwelling) fungi in the family Cordieritidaceae. Species in the genus grow on other lichens as commensals, apparently without harming their hosts. They produce small, black, disc-like fruiting bodies that sit directly on the host lichen's surface.

== Taxonomy ==
Llimoniella is a genus of lichenicolous discomycetes that was described as new in 1993. Josef Hafellner and Père Navarro-Rosinés designated Llimoniella scabridula as the type species. The genus name honours Xavier Llimona of Barcelona, a specialist on Spain's cryptogam flora and gypsum-soil lichen communities. The genus was introduced for two closely related species, L. adnata and L. scabridula. Species of Llimoniella are lichenicolous and described as commensalistic (apparently not harming the host), producing black apothecia that are sessile to shortly stalked and distinctly marginate, with a plane to slightly concave disc that can become convex with age.

The exciple is built from dark, thick-walled, mostly isodiametric cells arranged in chains, with the outer cells often enlarged or swollen, and it lacks both excipular hairs and periphysoids. The hymenium is iodine-negative (KI−) and the epihymenium is usually purplish, while a reddish to purplish-brown pigment in the exciple and epihymenium turns violaceous in potassium hydroxide solution (K). Some species also show a pale olivaceous pigment that becomes bright green in K, and a yellowish-orange pigment in the excipular/epihymenial gel that turns bright orange in nitric acid (N). Asci are thin-walled and usually 8-spored, and the hyaline ascospores are smooth, lack a distinct perispore, and range from aseptate to 3-septate. In their synopsis, Diederich and Etayo transferred several previously attributed species to other genera (including Rhymbocarpus), and treated L. groenlandiae as belonging outside Llimoniella because it lacked the pigments then considered diagnostic for the genus.

In 2010, Diederich, Ertz and Etayo proposed an "enlarged concept" of Llimoniella and assembled an informal L. phaeophysciae group that includes taxa formerly described in Gelatinopsis, Geltingia and other genera. Members of this group share dark, often marginate ascomata and thin-walled, I−/K/I− asci, but have excipular and epihymenial pigments that do not react with KOH. The authors argued that pigment differences alone are not enough to split the genus, so they retained the L. phaeophysciae group within a broader Llimoniella (sensu lato, in the broad sense)) despite the lack of a positive K reaction. Under this broad circumscription, Llimoniella can still be separated from the related genus Rhymbocarpus by Rhymbocarpus having a greenish, K+ olivaceous epihymenial pigment and a different excipular anatomy, with excipular hairs present in some species. The same 2010 study presented a revised key to the species of Llimoniella to reflect these changes.

== Species ==
- Llimoniella acarosporicola (Kocourk. & K.Knudsen) Diederich & Ertz (2010)
- Llimoniella adnata Hafellner & Nav.-Ros. (1993)
- Llimoniella bergeriana Etayo (2017)
- Llimoniella caloplacae S.Y.Kondr. & Khodos. (2006)
- Llimoniella catapyrenii Zhurb., Kukwa & Flakus (2013)
- Llimoniella chilensis Zhurb. (2020)
- Llimoniella cinnabarinae Pérez-Ort., Etayo & T.Sprib. (2011)
- Llimoniella fuscatae Hafellner & Obermayer (2007)
- Llimoniella fuscoatrae Hafellner (1996)
- Llimoniella gregorellae Kocourk. (2013)
- Llimoniella heppiae (Nav.-Ros., Hladún & Llimona) Diederich & Ertz (2010)
- Llimoniella muralicola Halıcı (2008)
- Llimoniella parmotrematis Etayo (2017)
- Llimoniella pertusariae Diederich & Etayo (2000)
- Llimoniella phaeophysciae Diederich, Ertz & Etayo (2010)
- Llimoniella placomaroneae Etayo (2010)
- Llimoniella placopsidis Diederich & Fryday (2010)
- Llimoniella pyrenulae Diederich & Etayo (2000)
- Llimoniella ramalinae (Müll.Arg.) Etayo & Diederich (2000)
- Llimoniella scabridula (Müll.Arg.) Nav.-Ros. & Hafellner (1993)
- Llimoniella stereocaulorum (Alstrup & D.Hawksw.) Hafellner (1996)
- Llimoniella terricola (Arnold) M.Schultz, Diederich & Ertz (2010)
