= Skyttea ochrolechiae =

Scientific classification
- Domain: Eukaryota
- Kingdom: Fungi
- Division: Ascomycota
- Class: Leotiomycetes
- Order: Cyttariales
- Family: Cordieritidaceae
- Genus: Skyttea
- Species: S. ochrolechiae

Binomial name
- Skyttea ochrolechiae Zhurb. (2015)

Species of lichen

Skyttea ochrolechiae is a species of lichenicolous (lichen-dwelling) fungus in the family Cordieritidaceae. Found in Japan, it was formally described as a new species in 2015 by Russian mycologist Mikhail P. Zhurbenko. The fungus grows on the epiphytic lichen Ochrolechia trochophora, but does not visibly damage its host. It is somewhat similar to Skyttea fusispora, but unlike that fungus, it has an orange-brown exciple that stains purple with the K test, and has shorter ascospores, typically measuring 14.7‒18.9 by 3.1‒3.9 μm.
