= Thamnogalla episolorina =

Scientific classification
- Kingdom: Fungi
- Division: Ascomycota
- Class: Leotiomycetes
- Order: Cyttariales
- Family: Cordieritidaceae
- Genus: Thamnogalla
- Species: T. episolorina

Binomial name
- Thamnogalla episolorina Zhurb. (2021)

Species of fungus

Thamnogalla episolorina is a species of lichenicolous fungus in the family Cordieritidaceae. It grows on Solorina.
