= Echinodiscus =

Echinodiscus is the scientific name of several genera of organisms and may refer to:

- Echinodiscus (echinoderm) Leske, 1778, an extant genus of sea urchins in the family Astriclypeidae
  - Fossil echinoderm genera with the name Echinodiscus have been described by d'Orbigny (1854) Worthen & Miller (1883) and Stürtz (1900). These names are junior homonyms
- Echinodiscus (fungus) Etayo & Diederich (2000), a genus of fungi in the order Helotiales
- Echinodiscus (plant) Benth. (1838), a genus of plants in the family Fabaceae
