= Llimoniella cinnabarinae =

Scientific classification
- Kingdom: Fungi
- Division: Ascomycota
- Class: Leotiomycetes
- Order: Cyttariales
- Family: Cordieritidaceae
- Genus: Llimoniella
- Species: L. cinnabarinae

Binomial name
- Llimoniella cinnabarinae Pérez-Ort., Etayo & T.Sprib. (2011)

Species of lichen-forming fungus

Llimoniella cinnabarinae is a species of lichenicolous (lichen-dwelling) fungus in the family Cordieritidaceae. It occurs in Alaska, where it grows on the thallus on the lichen Ramboldia cinnabarina.

== Taxonomy ==
Llimoniella cinnabarinae was formally described as a new species in 2011 by Sergio Pérez-Ortega, Javier Etayo, and Toby Spribille. The holotype (specimen Spribille 27868) is deposited in the herbarium of the New York Botanical Garden (NY). It was collected in the United States (Alaska), in Matanuska-Susitna Borough within Denali National Park and Preserve, from the west bank of the Yentna River below the terminus of Tok Glacier. The fungus was found growing on the crustose lichen species Ramboldia cinnabarina, which itself was growing on spruce.

== Description ==
Species of Llimoniella cinnabarinae are lichenicolous fungi that live within the thallus of the lichen Ramboldia cinnabarina. Their fruiting bodies (ascomata) are black and roughly circular, measuring about 180–300 μm in diameter. The rim of the fruiting body (the exciple) and the uppermost spore-bearing layer (the epihymenium) are brown, and they react in potassium hydroxide solution (K) by turning brown-orange. The hymenium is clear (not inspersed). The asci are more or less cylindrical to club-shaped, each typically containing eight spores. The ascospores are strictly ellipsoid and measure (15–)16–18(–20) × 3–4(–5) μm.
