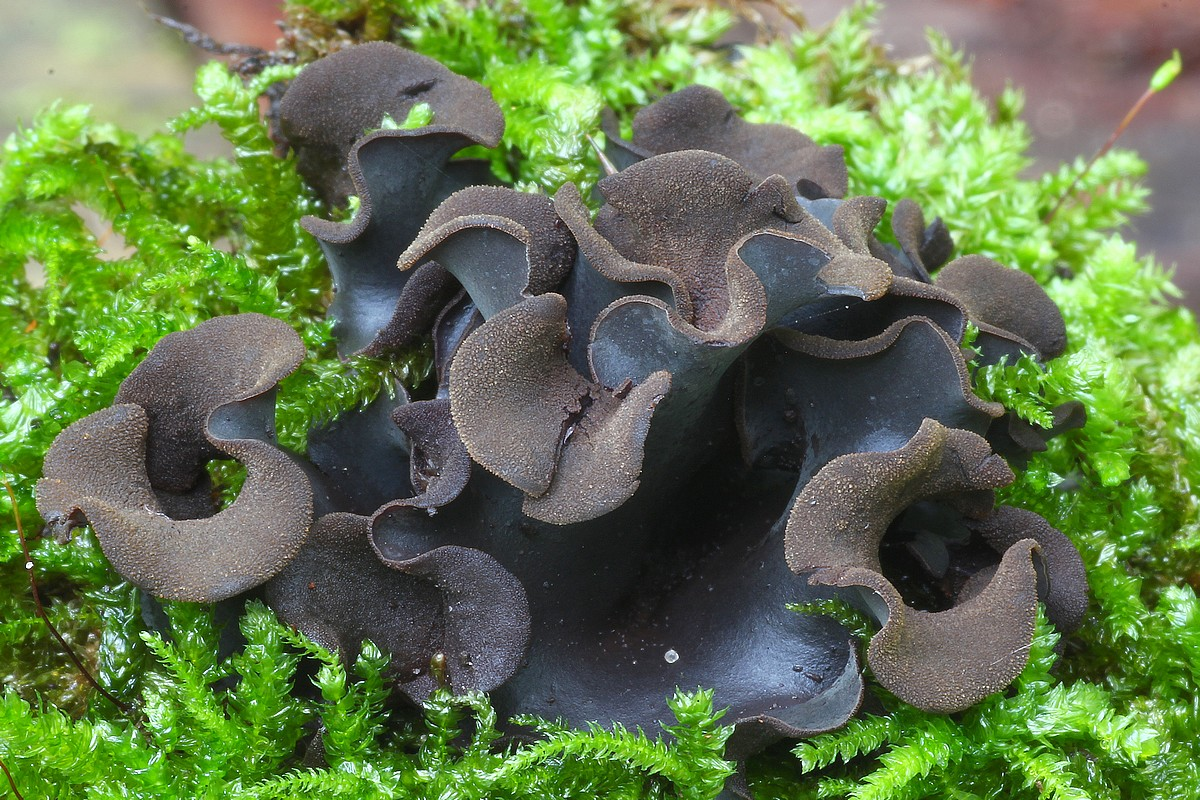
- Diplocarpa irregularis, formerly Ionomidotis irregularis

Scientific classification
- Domain: Eukaryota
- Kingdom: Fungi
- Division: Ascomycota
- Class: Leotiomycetes
- Order: Cyttariales
- Family: Cordieritidaceae
- Genus: Diplocarpa; Massee (1895)

Type species
- Diplocarpa curreyana Massee (1895)

= Diplocarpa =

Genus of fungi

Diplocarpa is a genus of fungi in the family Dermateaceae. It contains the single species Diplocarpa curreyana, described as new to science by English botanist George Edward Massee in 1895.
