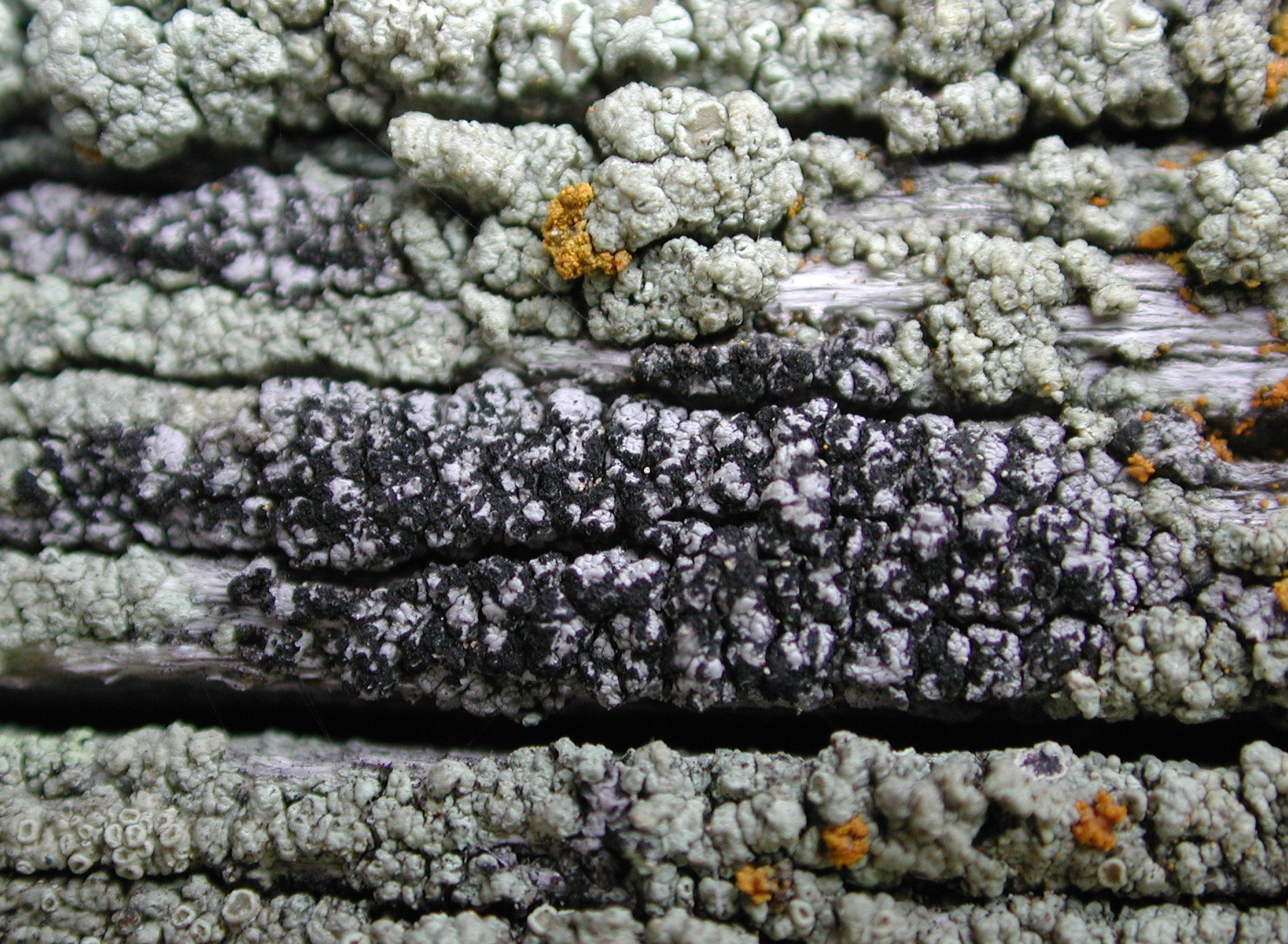
- Pseudothelomma ocellatum

Scientific classification
- Kingdom: Fungi
- Division: Ascomycota
- Class: Lecanoromycetes
- Order: Caliciales
- Family: Caliciaceae
- Genus: Pseudothelomma; M.Prieto & Wedin (2016)

Type species
- Pseudothelomma ocellatum (Flot. ex Körb.) M.Prieto & Wedin (2016)

Species
- P. occidentale P. ocellatum

= Pseudothelomma =

Genus of lichens

Pseudothelomma is a genus of crustose pin lichens in the family Caliciaceae. It contains two species. The genus was established in 2016 when DNA analysis revealed that two species previously classified in the genus Thelomma were actually distinct and formed their own separate evolutionary group. These lichens are distinguished by their preference for growing on dry, bark-free conifer wood and their black, flat spore-bearing structures that may have a greenish-yellow powdery coating.

== Taxonomy ==
Pseudothelomma was circumscribed in 2017 by the lichenologists Maria Prieto and Mats Wedin. Molecular analyses of a five–locus data set showed that the wood-dwelling lichens long treated as Thelomma ocellatum and T. occidentale do not nest with Thelomma in the strict sense (sensu stricto) (a coastal, saxicolous lineage), but instead form their own well-supported clade within the family Caliciaceae. To accommodate this lineage, Maria Prieto and Mats Wedin erected the new genus Pseudothelomma, designating P. ocellatum (originally described as Acolium ocellatum in 1861) as the type species and transferring T. occidentale as P. occidentale. The generic name refers to the superficial resemblance to Thelomma while signalling its distinct phylogenetic position.

Phylogenetically, Pseudothelomma belongs to a lineage that also contains Tholurna dissimilis and the stalked genus Allocalicium, but it is readily separated from those taxa by its thin, crystal-free cortex, immersed apothecia with a laterally very thin excipulum, and by its preference for dry, decorticated conifer wood rather than rock or bark substrates. The genus currently contains two accepted species both characterised by black, flat mazaedia that may carry a greenish-yellow pruina and by one-septate, dark brown spores. Occasional production of usnic acid in the thallus and epanorin or rhizocarpic acid in the hymenium further distinguishes the group within the family.

== Description ==
Pseudothelomma has a thallus that is crustose, and grey, with a thin cortex. The ascomata are immersed in wrinkles, and are flat, sometimes with a green or yellow pruina on the mazaedia. The spores have a single septum and are black-brown. Secondary chemicals found in Pseudothelomma include usnic acid in the thallus (occasionally), and epanorin and rhizocarpic acid in the hymenium and mazaedium.

== Species ==
- Pseudothelomma occidentale (Herre) M.Prieto & Wedin (2016)
- Pseudothelomma ocellatum (Flot. ex Körb.) M.Prieto & Wedin (2016)
