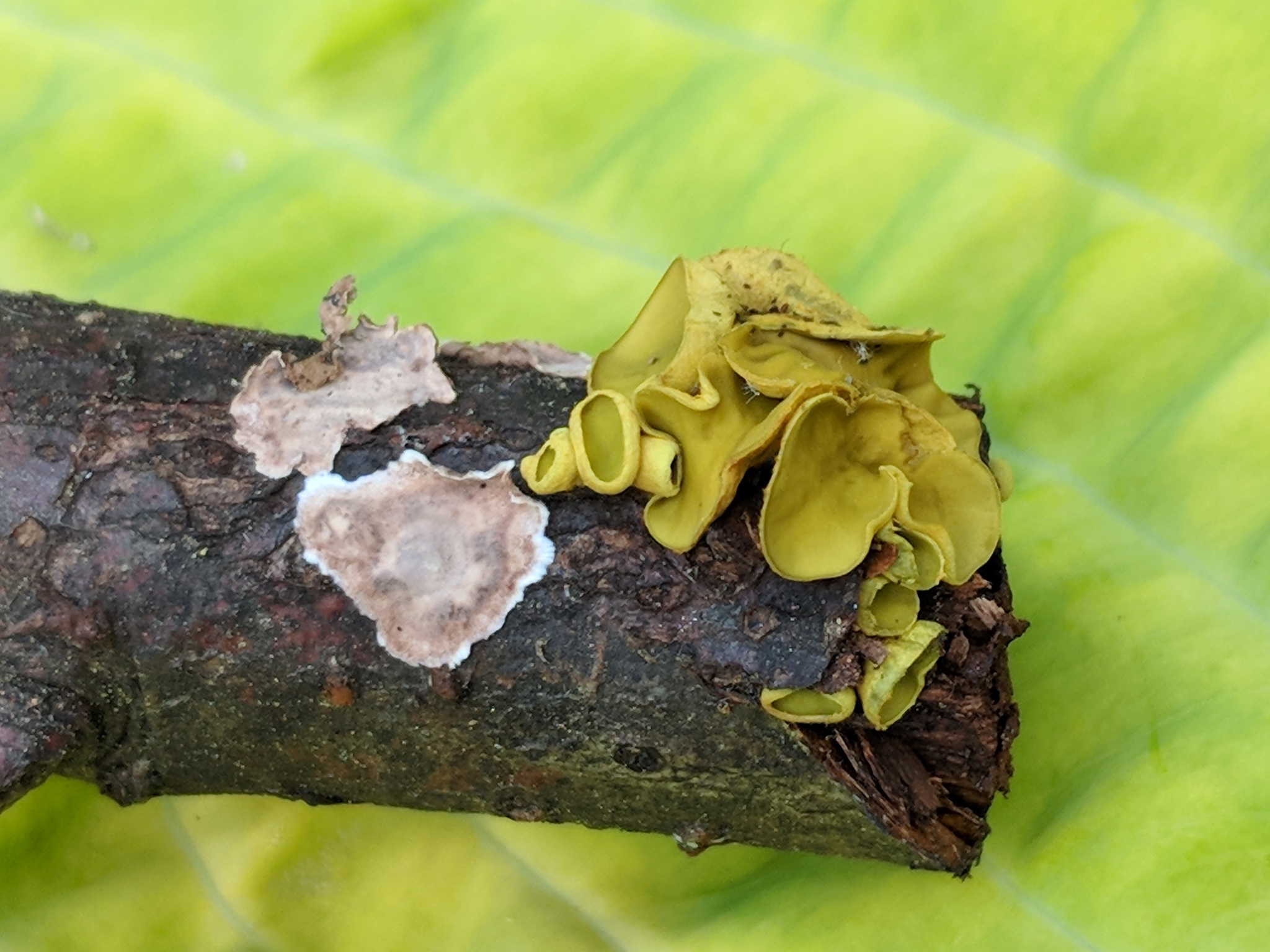
- Ionomidotis fulvotingens

Scientific classification
- Domain: Eukaryota
- Kingdom: Fungi
- Division: Ascomycota
- Class: Leotiomycetes
- Order: Cyttariales
- Family: Cordieritidaceae
- Genus: Ionomidotis; E.J.Durand ex Thaxt., 1923

= Ionomidotis =

Genus of fungi

Ionomidotis is a genus of fungi belonging to the family Cordieritidaceae.

The species of this genus are found in Eurasia and Northern America.

Species:

- Ionomidotis fulvotingens (Berk. & M.A.Curtis) E.K.Cash
