= Unguiculella =

Scientific classification
- Domain: Eukaryota
- Kingdom: Fungi
- Division: Ascomycota
- Class: Leotiomycetes
- Order: Cyttariales
- Family: Cordieritidaceae
- Genus: Unguiculella; Höhn. (1906)

Type species
- Unguiculella falcipila Höhn. (1906)

Synonyms
- Globulina Velen. (1934)

Genus of lichen

Unguiculella is a genus of lichen-forming fungi in the family Cordieritidaceae. A total of 17 species fall under this genus.

== Species ==
- Unguiculella aggregata (Feltgen) Höhn. (1906)
- Unguiculella caespitosa Dennis (1950)
- Unguiculella eurotioides (P.Karst.) Nannf. (1936)
- Unguiculella foliicola (Graddon) Spooner & P.M.Kirk (1989)
- Unguiculella globosa Ekanayaka, Q.Zhao & K.D.Hyde (2019)
- Unguiculella hamulata (Feltgen) Höhn. (1906)
- Unguiculella incarnatina (Quél.) Baral (2020)
- Unguiculella jamaicensis W.Y.Zhuang & Korf (1989)
- Unguiculella meliolicola Dennis (1955)
- Unguiculella nectriiphila Svrček (1992)
- Unguiculella oregonensis (Kanouse) Dennis (1963)
- Unguiculella robergei (Desm.) Dennis (1955)
- Unguiculella sarothamni (Velen.) Svrček (1978)
- Unguiculella tityri (Velen.) Huhtinen & Spooner (2003)
