= Skyttella =

Scientific classification
- Domain: Eukaryota
- Kingdom: Fungi
- Division: Ascomycota
- Class: Leotiomycetes
- Order: Cyttariales
- Family: Cordieritidaceae
- Genus: Skyttella; D.Hawksw. & R.Sant. (1988)

Type species
- Skyttella mulleri (Willey) D.Hawksw. & R.Sant. (1988)

Species
- S. mulleri S. stictae

Genus of fungi

Skyttella is a genus of lichenicolous fungi in the family Cordieritidaceae. It contains two species. The genus was circumscribed in 1988 by David Leslie Hawksworth and Rolf Santesson, with Skyttella mulleri assigned as the type species. This species, which parasitizes the lobes of foliose lichens in the genus Peltigera, was previously classified in the genus Phacopsis. Skyttella stictae, an Ecuadorian species that grows on Sticta, was added to the genus in 2017.

The genus name of Skyttella is in honour of Mogens Skytte Christiansen (1918 - 1996), a Danish botanist (interested in Microbiology, Mycology an Lichenology), and also a botanical illustrator.
