= Austrocenangium =

Scientific classification
- Domain: Eukaryota
- Kingdom: Fungi
- Division: Ascomycota
- Class: Leotiomycetes
- Order: Cyttariales
- Family: Cordieritidaceae
- Genus: Austrocenangium; Gamundí (1997)

Type species
- Austrocenangium australe (Speg.) Gamundí (1997)

Species
- A. australe A. nanum

Genus of fungi

Austrocenangium is a genus of fungi in the family Cordieritidaceae. It contains two species.
