= Midotiopsis =

Scientific classification
- Domain: Eukaryota
- Kingdom: Fungi
- Division: Ascomycota
- Class: Leotiomycetes
- Order: Cyttariales
- Family: Cordieritidaceae
- Genus: Midotiopsis; Henn. (1902)

Type species
- Midotiopsis bambusicola Henn. (1902)

Species
- M. bambusicola M. jamaicensis

Genus of fungi

Midotiopsis is a genus of fungi in the order Helotiales. It has two species.
