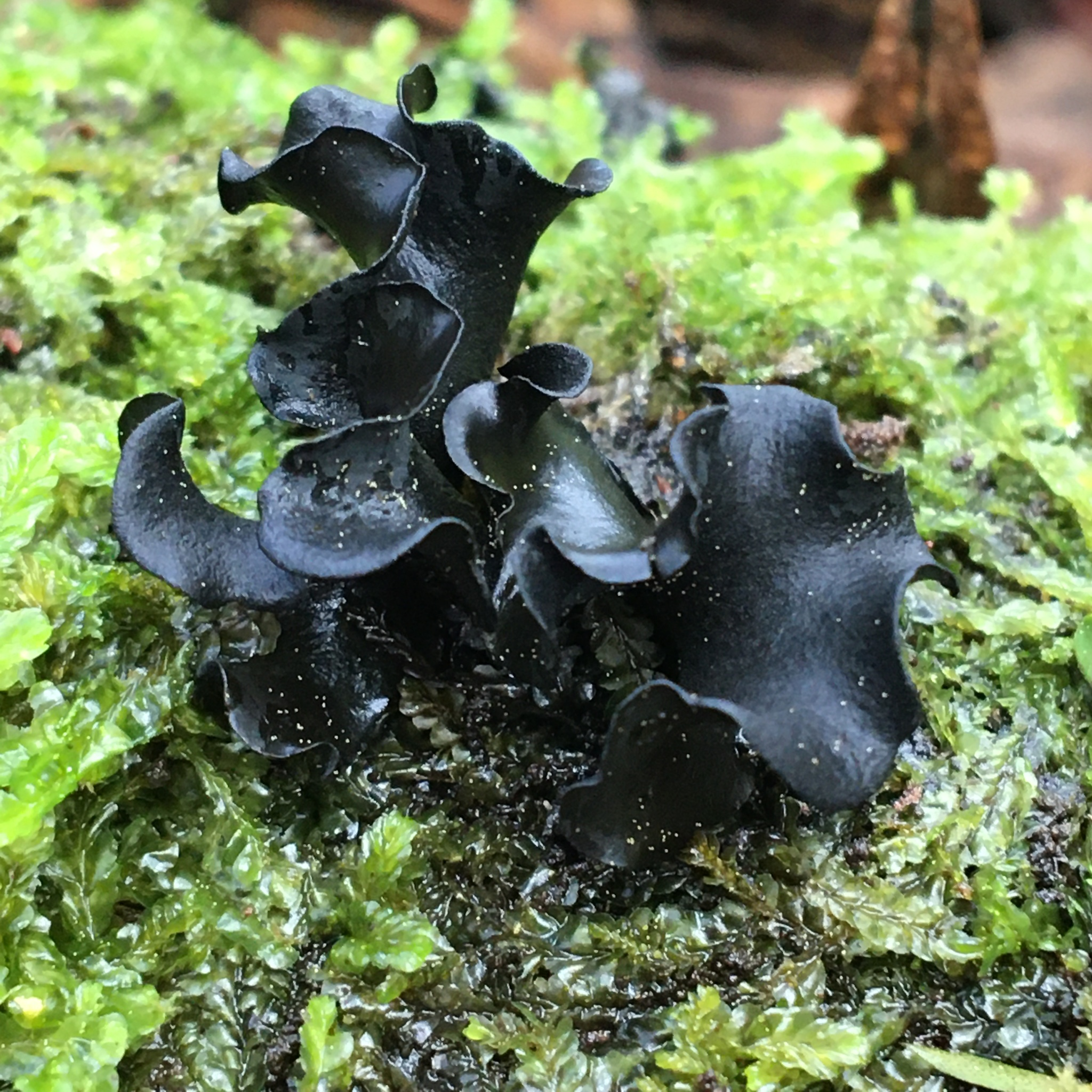
- Cordierites frondosus

Scientific classification
- Domain: Eukaryota
- Kingdom: Fungi
- Division: Ascomycota
- Class: Leotiomycetes
- Order: Cyttariales
- Family: Cordieritidaceae
- Genus: Cordierites; Mont. (1840)

Type species
- Cordierites guianensis Mont. (1840)

= Cordierites =

Genus of fungi

Cordierites is a genus of fungi in the family Cordieritidaceae.

The genus name of Cordierites is in honour of François Simon Cordier (1797-1874), a French military doctor and botanist (Mycology), he was a founder member and president of the Société botanique de France in 1872.

The genus was circumscribed by Jean Pierre François Camille Montagne in Ann. Sci. Nat. Bot. ser. 2, Vol.14 on page 330 in 1840.

== Species ==
The following species are recognised in the genus Cordierites:

- Cordierites acanthophorus Samuels & L.M.Kohn (1987)
- Cordierites boedijnii W.Y.Zhuang (1988)
- Cordierites coralloides Berk. & M.A. Curtis (1869)
- Cordierites fasciculata Möller (1901)
- Cordierites guyanensis Mont. (1840)
- Cordierites muscoides Berk. & M.A. Curtis (1875)
- Cordierites umbilicarioides Möller (1901)
