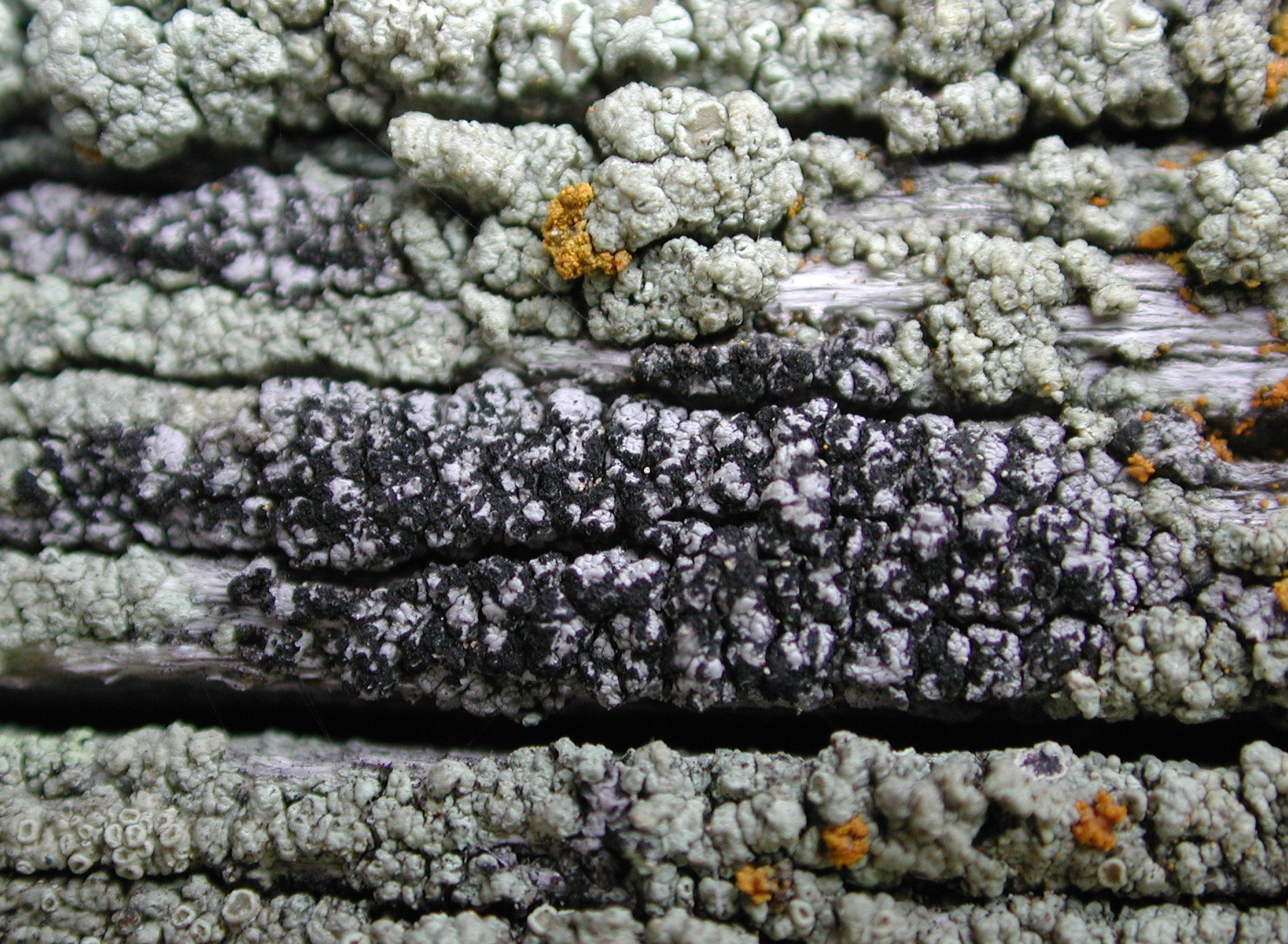

Scientific classification
- Kingdom: Fungi
- Division: Ascomycota
- Class: Lecanoromycetes
- Order: Caliciales
- Family: Caliciaceae
- Genus: Pseudothelomma
- Species: P. ocellatum

Binomial name
- Pseudothelomma ocellatum (Flot. ex Körb.) M.Prieto & Wedin (2016)

Synonyms
- Trachylia tympanella var. ocellata (Flot. ex Körb.) Fr. (1835); Acolium ocellatum Flot. ex Körb. (1861); Trachylia ocellata (Flot. ex Körb.) Flot. ex Körb. (1861); Cyphelium ocellatum (Flot. ex Körb.) Trevis. (1862); Thelomma ocellatum (Flot. ex Körb.) Tibell (1976)

= Pseudothelomma ocellatum =

Species of lichen

Pseudothelomma ocellatum is a species of lignicolous (wood-dwelling), crustose lichen in the family Caliciaceae. This lichen is characterised by its grey, areolate thallus that produces abundant lichenised diaspores, such as short spherical isidia and coarse, dark brown-black soredia. It is typically sterile, meaning apothecia (fruiting bodies) are absent.

Pseudothelomma ocellatum is primarily a Northern Hemisphere lichen, especially found in temperate to cool temperate areas, and somewhat rare in North America where its range has expanded from southern California to the Yukon since its first documentation in 1978. Its habitats include weathered wooden structures influenced by nitrate enrichment, and while it is largely found in European mountain ranges and reported in New Zealand and South Africa, recent findings also place it in Tasmania, suggesting a broader distribution than previously thought.

Catillaria fungoides and overgrown Buellia griseovirens share certain visible traits with P. ocellatum, like dark pigmented soralia, but differ in substrate preference and chemical composition, respectively. Cyphelium inquinans also resembles P. ocellatum but is distinguishable by its crust texture, exciple colour, and absence of the sorediate-isidiate feature that characterises P. ocellatum.

== Taxonomy ==
The lichen was originally described in 1861 by Gustav Wilhelm Körber, as Acolium ocellatum. In his original description of the lichen, Körber mentioned the roughened, granulose-verrucose texture, dark ash-grey thallus of A. ocellatum, as well as its whitened appearance in alpine regions. He also described the species' apothecia (fruiting bodies), which are born from prominent thalloid warts and change from a bluish-green pruina-covered disc to a bare, dark form, barely exceeding the thick, persistent thalloid margin. Additionally, Körber noted the peculiar large, obscurely dark brown spores and the black germination layer. He commented that the sterile form of the lichen (i.e., without any apothecia) was more frequent. Several collections sites around Central Europe were recorded, including Italy, Germany, and Switzerland.

The taxon ended up in the genus Thelomma when Leif Tibell transferred it there in 1976. It was again transferred by María Prieto and Mats Wedin to the newly created genus Pseudothelomma in 2016, in which it was assigned as the type species. The name Cyphelium caliciforme (Flot.) Zahlbr. (1922) has sometimes been used to refer to this species in historical literature, but according to John Walter Thomson, this name is not valid because it is based on a nomen nudum.

Vernacular names that have been used for this species in North America include "granulating guano pots" and "small-eyed nipple lichen".

== Description ==
Pseudothelomma ocellatum has a crustose (crust-like) thallus that is well-developed, with either a mosaic-like pattern (areolate) or elevated, coarse, and flattened warts, typically coloured grey. The lichen is characterised by frequent isidia, which are small, outgrowth propagules that form irregular but well-defined clusters of blue or brown-black colour, generally slightly raised (convex).

The medulla, or inner layer of the thallus, turns a blue colour when iodine is applied (I+ blue). The reproductive structures, known as apothecia, are immersed within the thallus; they are generally absent in this species, although there have been reported instances of this normally sterile lichen as fertile. Ascospores of P. ocellatum are divided by a single internal cross wall (1-septate), pinched at the division (constricted at the septum), and have an uneven surface; they measure 22–28 micrometres (μm) in length and 12–15 μm in width. They sometimes have a slightly ornamentation consisting of irregular surface striations, visible using light microscopy.

Chemical spot tests on the thallus yield negative results (C−, K−, Pd−, UV−), suggesting the absence of secondary metabolites (lichen products). However, the species has occasionally been recorded as containing compounds such as atranorin, norstictic acid, and usnic acid. Specifically, the outer ring of the apothecia (exciple) and the mass of ascospores may contain rhizocarpic acid and epanorin.

=== Similar species ===
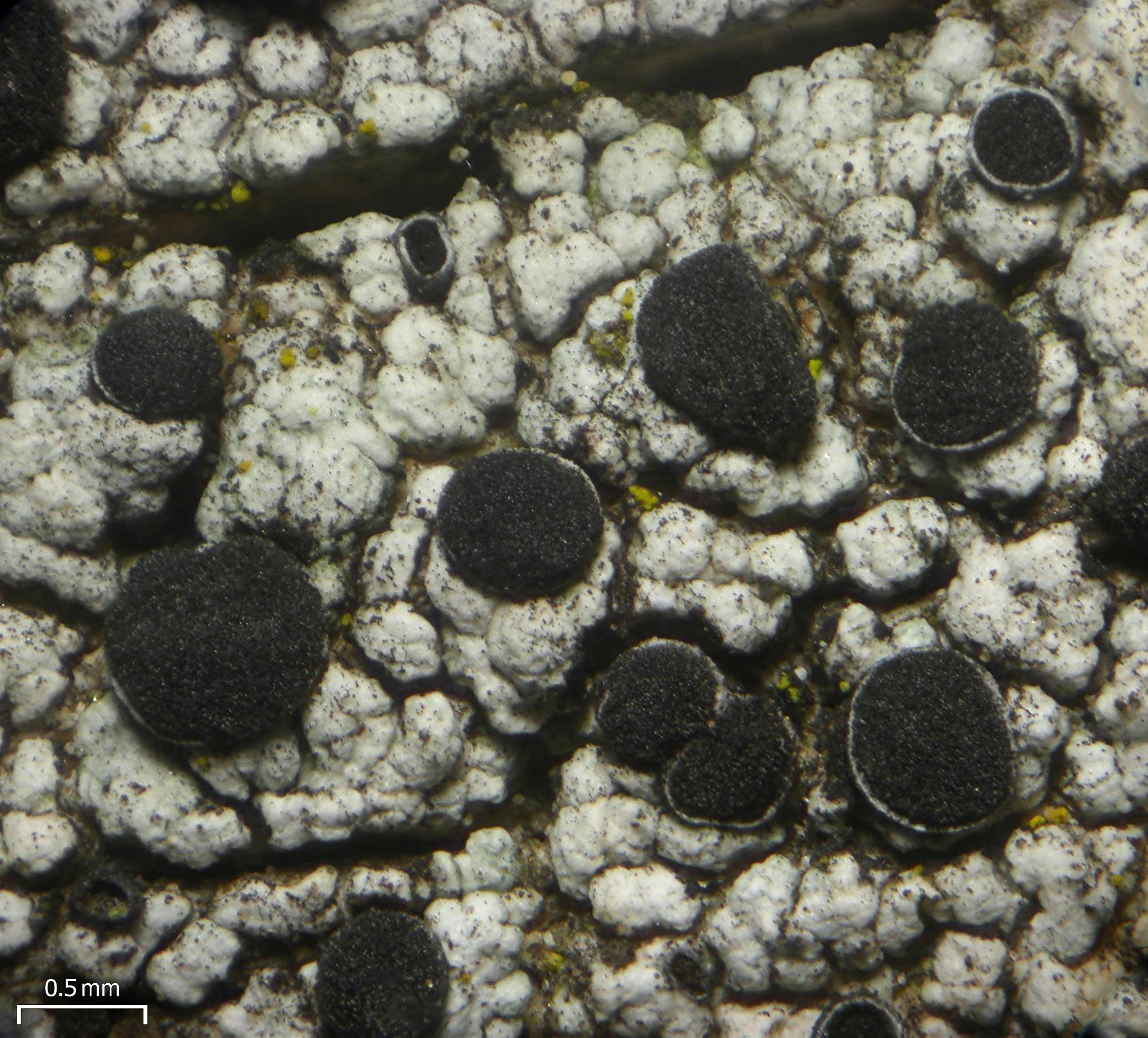
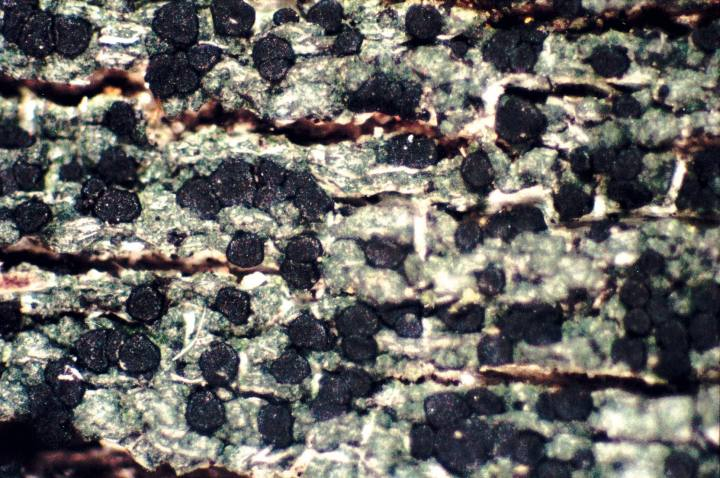
Cyphelium inquinans (left) and Trapeliopsis flexuosa (right) are lookalikes of P. ocellatum.

Catillaria fungoides shares some characteristics with Pseudothelomma ocellatum, such as dark pigmented soralia and an absence of lichen products. However, unlike Pseudothelomma ocellatum, C. fungoides typically grows on the smooth bark of relatively young hardwoods, and has a greenish-grey-coloured thallus. Overgrown forms of Buellia griseovirens also somewhat resemble P. ocellatum due to the presence of a white thallus with what appears to be dark brownish-black soredia. Buellia griseovirens can be sometimes be distinguished from P. ocellatum by the presence of the diagnostic substances atranorin and norstictic acid. However, the report of norstictic acid-deficient populations of Buellia griseovirens in the Yukon of Canada indicates that the chemical variability in this species is greater than previously suspected. The sterile morphs of the lichen Trapeliopsis flexuosa have been suggested as another potential lookalike.

Cyphelium inquinans, another similar species, can sometimes resemble Pseudothelomma ocellatum due to its thick crust and partially immersed apothecia. However, the two can be distinguished: P. ocellatum features a thick, gray verrucose crust with dark granular soredioid isidia and typically contains apothecia within a thalline margin, whereas Cyphelium inquinans lacks these characteristics and has a blackish exciple compared to Pseudothelomma's pale exciple sides. Additionally, P. ocellatum consistently displays sorediate-isidiate traits, further differentiating it from Cyphelium inquinans.

== Habitat, distribution, and ecology ==
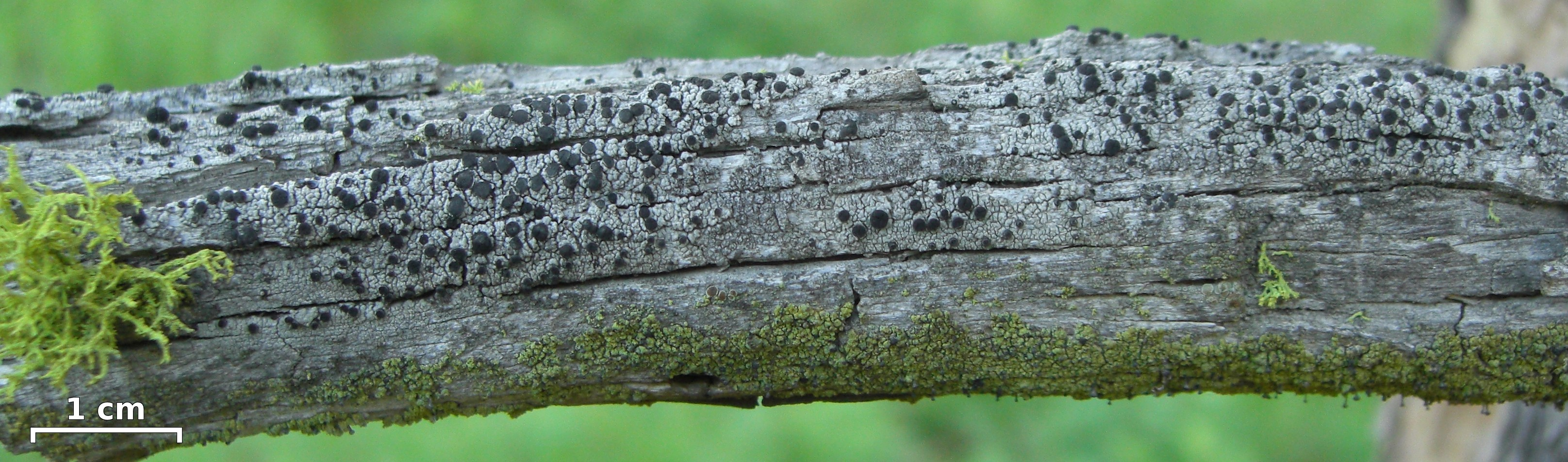
Pseudothelomma ocellatum (top and middle of branch) and Calicium viride (bottom of branch)

Pseudothelomma ocellatum is distributed widely in the Northern Hemisphere, particularly in temperate to cool temperate areas. It was once believed to be confined to the western mountainous regions from southern California to British Columbia, extending as far inland as central Montana. Tibell first documented the species in 1978, with the next report coming from British Columbia in 1992. In 1995, McCune and Rosentreter noted that the species is rarely found west of the Cascade crest in Oregon and Washington and is absent from the extreme coastal regions. In California, the lichen seems to be prevalent in the northeast part of the state and becomes less frequent moving southward, occurring sporadically in both the Sierra foothills and the Coast Ranges. A significant discovery in 2013, however, extended its range to include the Yukon, marking a notable expansion of its distribution. A search of North America herbaria in the mid-1990s turned up a few specimens of Pseudothelomma ocellatum that had been stored under the name Cyphelium inquinans. In California, Pseudothelomma ocellatum has been observed growing on wooden corral boards adjacent to metal fence posts, a specific microhabitat thought to be influenced by nitrate enrichment caused by perching birds around these posts. The frequent occurrence of this lichen on bird perches, combined with its substantial tolerance for nutrient-rich environments, as well as its resilience to both desiccation and intense light, implies that birds may serve as a significant agent of dispersal.

In Italy, its distribution is restricted to the Alps; similarly, in Slovenia, it is known from a single record in the Slovenian Julian Alps. In Estonia, it has been classified as a vulnerable species because it is known from only a few records in restricted areas. The species also occurs in the Carpathians and the Sudeten Mountains. It was reported to occur in Tasmania, Australia, in 2022. Although this was claimed to be the first record of this species in the Southern Hemisphere, Tibell reported it as widely distributed in New Zealand in 1994. He suggested that it could be a recent accidental introduction. The lichen often grows on old weathered wooden fence posts, and sometimes wooden buildings. Tibell also reported it in 2000 from a single location in the Western Cape of South Africa. Thelomma ocellatum is found on both coniferous and hardwood wood in North America. Hardwood hosts include species such as Purshia and Robinia, while its coniferous partners encompass Abies, Juniperus, Larix, Pinus, Pseudotsuga, and Thuja. The lichen adapts well to open environments but is also found in partially shaded areas, particularly within open forests dominated by Pinus ponderosa, Pinus albicaulis, or Juniperus. Pseudothelomma ocellatum is sometimes found growing on the roots of tipped-over trees—but only those that also serve as bird perches.

Pseudothelomma ocellatum is a part of the Lecanorion variae alliance, a specific ecological community known for its low tolerance to pollution. This alliance, which includes species such as Strangospora moriformis, Strangospora pinicola, and Lecanora pulicaris, often thrives in similar, unpolluted habitats. The occurrence of this community, particularly in France, is commonly observed on wooden substrates like old vineyard stakes or abandoned agricultural wood, suggesting these lichens play a role in the ecological succession of these areas post-cultivation.
