= Ameghiniella =

Scientific classification
- Domain: Eukaryota
- Kingdom: Fungi
- Division: Ascomycota
- Class: Leotiomycetes
- Order: Cyttariales
- Family: Cordieritidaceae
- Genus: Ameghiniella; Speg. (1887)

Type species
- Ameghiniella australis Speg. (1887)

Species
- A. australis A. plicata

Genus of fungi

Ameghiniella is a genus of fungi in the family Cordieritidaceae. The genus contains 2 species.
