= Thamnogalla =

Scientific classification
- Kingdom: Fungi
- Division: Ascomycota
- Class: Leotiomycetes
- Order: Cyttariales
- Family: Cordieritidaceae
- Genus: Thamnogalla (Mudd) D.Hawksw. (1980)

Genus of fungi

Thamnogalla is a fungal genus in the family Cordieritidaceae. It is a small genus of two species, Thamnogalla crombiei and Thamnogalla episolorina.

The genus was circumscribed in 1980 by David Leslie Hawksworth. The type species was originally described as Endocarpon crombiei by amateur botanist and collector William Mudd.
