= Xerotrema quercicola =

Scientific classification
- Kingdom: Fungi
- Division: Ascomycota
- Class: Lecanoromycetes
- Order: Odontotrematales
- Family: Odontotremataceae
- Genus: Xerotrema
- Species: X. quercicola

Binomial name
- Xerotrema quercicola Coppins & Aptroot (2008)

Species of lichen

Xerotrema quercicola is a species of lichen in the family Odontotremataceae. The species was described in 2008 from material collected on a standing, barkless oak trunk in Scotland, and is characterised by its small, dark brown apothecia with distinctively green-tinged margins. It is endemic to Great Britain, where it inhabits the hard wood of dead oak trees in veteran woodland settings.

== Taxonomy ==
Xerotrema quercicola was described as a new species by Brian J. Coppins and André Aptroot from material collected on a standing, barkless oak trunk near Loch Aline, Westernesse, Scotland. Coppins and Aptroot diagnosed X. quercicola as closely resembling Xerotrema megalospora but differing in a set of consistent characters: a distinctly green-tinged rim (exciple) when viewed in water, a basal tissue that shows a reaction in the standard K followed by iodine test (K/I), smaller spores on average, and a different substrate preference (oak rather than pine). The holotype was gathered on 13 November 2006 from a standing, decorticated Quercus trunk near Ardtornish, above Rubha na Samhnachain, at about 40 m elevation.

Within higher classification, Xerotrema has been placed in the Odontotremataceae, but the amyloid reaction of the spores in X. quercicola (they turn violet in iodine) suggested affinity with the Thelotremataceae (a family that has since been synonymised with the Graphidaceae). In contrast, spores of X. megalospora do not show this iodine reaction. As with several members of Xerotrema, the lichenisation state is unusual: X. megalospora is often associated with the green alga Trentepohlia (implying at least facultative lichenisation), whereas no such alga has been detected in the immediate vicinity of X. quercicola apothecia.

== Description ==
The thallus (the lichen body) is not apparent on the wood surface and the species may be only doubtfully lichenised. The apothecia (the disc-like, spore-producing structures) are small, 0.3–0.6 mm in diameter, with a dark brown, urn-shaped (urceolate) disc. Their margins are toothed (dentate) and show coarse radial striations. The rim tissue (exciple) has a clear green tinge in water mounts, and its lower parts give a K/I reaction (the sequential potassium hydroxide plus iodine test).

The asci (spore sacs) are large, 140–180 × 35–40 micrometres (μm), and characteristically 1-spored. The single ascospores are also large, 52–98 × 16–28 μm, and densely muriform—divided by many cross-walls into a brick-like internal pattern—with lumen diameters of about 3–4 μm; in iodine they stain violet (I+), indicating an amyloid wall chemistry. No asexual reproductive structures (pycnidia) have been observed. No lichen products were detected in the material examined.

For separation from the look-alike X. megalospora: X. quercicola tends to have smaller, iodine-positive spores and a green-tinged exciple, and it occurs on oak; X. megalospora usually occupies standing, barkless pine trunks in the native pinewoods of the Scottish Highlands and is commonly associated with Trentepohlia.

== Habitat and distribution ==
Xerotrema quercicola grows on dry or rapidly drying, firm wood of standing, dead oak trunks that have lost their bark. It is characteristic of veteran, formerly coppiced oak woodland that is self-thinning, leaving scattered, pale, barkless stems in relatively open, pasture-woodland settings. Verified records are from Wales (Merionethshire), western Scotland (Argyll and Westernesse) and southern England (Hampshire, New Forest). Additional specimens have been collected from several old-growth or semi-natural oak woods in these regions, always on hard, decorticated oak wood and often in open or lightly shaded parts of the stand.

== Conservation ==
A 2012 national evaluation classed X. quercicola as Near Threatened, noting that it is endemic to Great Britain, occupies a narrowly defined habitat (hard, standing oak wood), and is known from few, small populations. The authors added that a higher threat category could be justified if further work confirms its restricted range.
