= Neoechinodiscus =

Scientific classification
- Kingdom: Fungi
- Division: Ascomycota
- Class: Leotiomycetes
- Order: Helotiales
- Genus: Neoechinodiscus; Molinari & R.Sierra (2020)

Type species
- Neoechinodiscus lesdainii (Vouaux) R.Sierra & Molinari (2020)

Species
- N. kozhevnikovii N. lesdainii

Synonyms
- Echinodiscus Etayo & Diederich (2000)

Genus of fungi

Neoechinodiscus is a small genus of two lichen-parasitic fungi placed in the order Helotiales, but not yet assigned to a family. The two species in this genus produce minute, hairy, disc-shaped fruiting bodies on the surface of their lichen hosts. They are distinguished from similar fungi by their characteristic violet pigment, which changes to blue-grey or reddish-orange when treated with different chemical solutions.

== Taxonomy ==
The species now called Neoechinodiscus lesdainii was first described as Phacopsis lesdainii by Léon Vouaux in 1914. When Javier Etayo and Paul Diederich re-examined fresh collections in the 1990s, they found that its minuscule, hairy apothecia (fruiting bodies), the striking violet pigment that turns blue-grey in K and reddish-orange in nitric acid, and the thin-walled, iodine-negative asci could not be reconciled with Phacopsis, Skyttea or any other known lichenicolous genus. They therefore erected the monotypic genus Echinodiscus in 2000 and, because Bouly de Lesdain's holotype had been destroyed during the Second World War, chose a Coppins specimen from Castle Coole, Northern Ireland, as a neotype. The generic name alluded to the "spiny" look of the hairy discs, and the authors placed the taxon in the order then called Leotiales (now Helotiales) but left it unassigned to family because no close relatives were apparent.

A second species, Echinodiscus kozhevnikovii, was added from the Russian Arctic in 2009, but the genus name itself proved to be an illegitimate later homonym of plant and diatom genera (1837 and 1925 respectively). Rather than conserve a little-used name, Molinari-Novoa and Sierra introduced the replacement name Neoechinodiscus in 2020 and made the necessary new combinations for both species, leaving the genus incertae sedis at familial rank within Helotiales.

== Description ==
Neoechinodiscus produces minute, blackish, disc-shaped fruiting bodies (apothecia) that rest on the surface of their lichen hosts rather than sinking into the thallus. Each disc is usually only 0.05–0.15 mm across and looks slightly shaggy because it is clothed in fine, colourless hairs. The narrow rim (a strongly reduced exciple) contains a distinctive violet pigment that turns blue-grey when a drop of potassium hydroxide solution is applied and reddish-orange in concentrated nitric acid—chemical reactions that make the genus easy to recognise and separate from superficially similar lichen parasites in the Helotiales.

Under the microscope, the spore-bearing layer (hymenium) is suffused with the same violet tint and lacks the iodine-positive layers seen in many other leotiomycete fungi. Sterile filaments (paraphyses) are simple, septate threads that mingle with the excipular hairs and remain mostly unswollen at their tips. The asci are club-shaped with a long stalk and an evenly thin wall; unlike those of many relatives they show no thickened apex and contain eight ascospores. These spores are colourless, single-celled and ellipsoid, typically 5.5–8.5 × 2.5–3 μm, often holding several oil droplets. No asexual propagules have been observed. The combination of hairy discs, unusual violet chemistry, thin-walled asci and tiny, aseptate spores distinguishes Neoechinodiscus from allied genera such as Skyttea and Rhymbocarpus.

== Species ==
- Neoechinodiscus kozhevnikovii (Zhurb.) Molinari & R.Sierra (2020)
- Neoechinodiscus lesdainii (Vouaux) R.Sierra & Molinari (2020)
