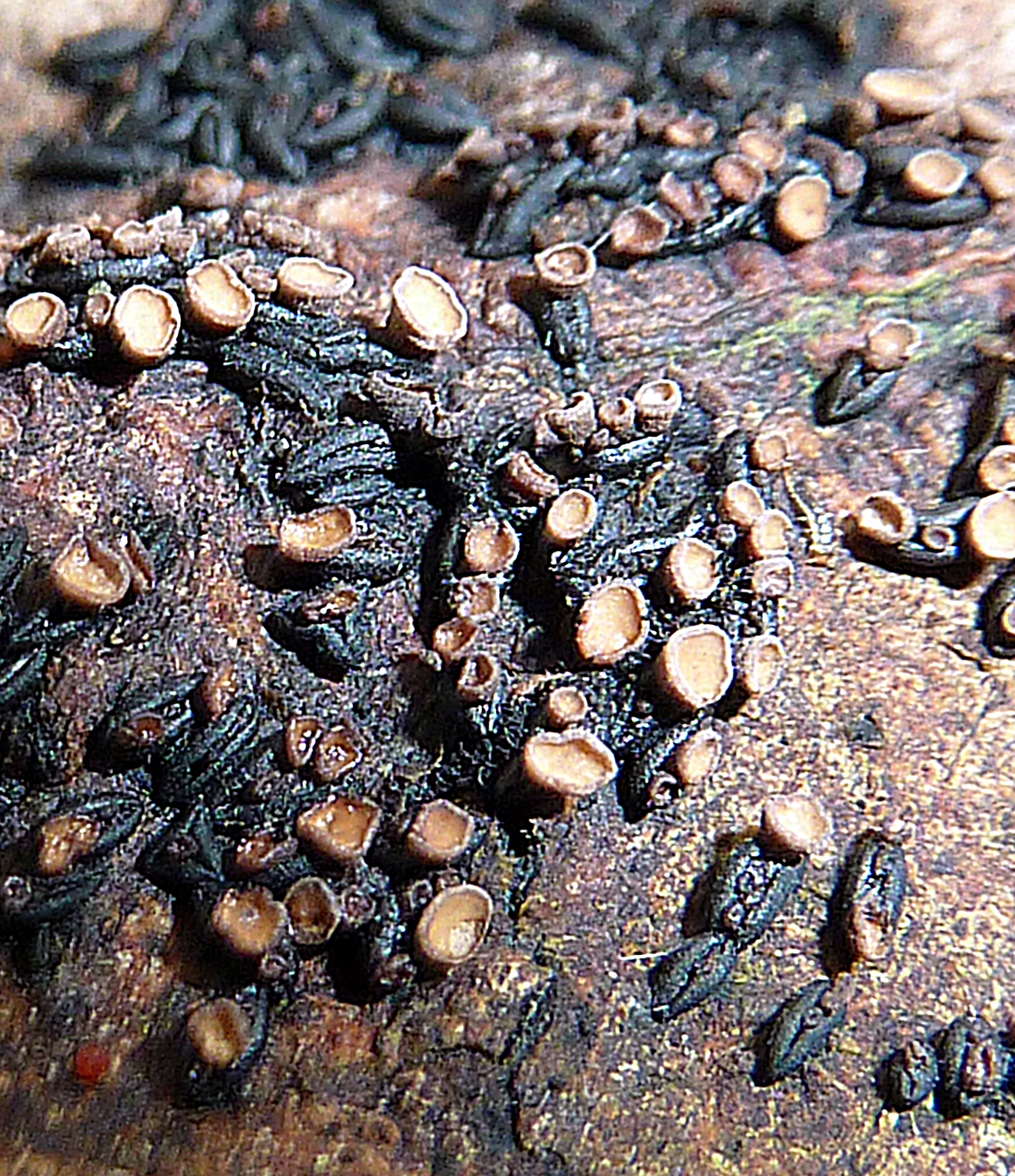
- Unguiculariopsis ravenelii

Scientific classification
- Domain: Eukaryota
- Kingdom: Fungi
- Division: Ascomycota
- Class: Leotiomycetes
- Order: Cyttariales
- Family: Cordieritidaceae
- Genus: Unguiculariopsis; Rehm (1909)

Type species
- Unguiculariopsis ilicincola (Berk. & Broome) Rehm (1909)

Synonyms
- Encoeliella Höhn. (1910); Mollisia subgen. Mollisiella W.Phillips (1887); Mollisiella (W.Phillips) Massee (1895); Xenostroma Höhn. (1915)

= Unguiculariopsis =

Genus of fungi

Unguiculariopsis is a genus of lichenicolous fungi in the family Cordieritidaceae. It has 29 species.

== Species ==
- Unguiculariopsis acerina W.Y.Zhuang (1988)
- Unguiculariopsis acrocordiae (Diederich) Diederich & Etayo (2000)
- Unguiculariopsis adirondacensis W.Y.Zhuang (1988)
- Unguiculariopsis ahtii D.Hawksw., D.J.Galloway & S.Y.Kondr. (1994)
- Unguiculariopsis australiensis (Höhn.) W.Y.Zhuang (1988)
- Unguiculariopsis caespitosa (Fuckel) W.Y.Zhuang (2014)
- Unguiculariopsis changbaiensis W.Y.Zhuang (2000)
- Unguiculariopsis damingshanica W.Y.Zhuang (2000)
- Unguiculariopsis dimorpha (Seaver) W.Y.Zhuang (1988)
- Unguiculariopsis godroniicola W.Y.Zhuang (1988)
- Unguiculariopsis groenlandiae (Alstrup & D.Hawksw.) Etayo & Diederich (2000)
- Unguiculariopsis hamatopilosa (Graddon) W.Y.Zhuang (1988)
- Unguiculariopsis helmutii S.Y.Kondr., Lőkös & Hur (2016)
- Unguiculariopsis hysterigena (Berk. & Broome) Korf (1971)
- Unguiculariopsis ilicincola (Berk. & Broome) Rehm (1909)
- Unguiculariopsis lesdainii (Vouaux) Etayo & Diederich (2000)
- Unguiculariopsis lettaui (Grummann) Coppins (1990)
- Unguiculariopsis livida (Bacc.) W.Y.Zhuang (1988)
- Unguiculariopsis lucaniae Brackel (2011)
- Unguiculariopsis macrocarpa Etayo (2008)
- Unguiculariopsis manriquei Etayo (1996)
- Unguiculariopsis parasitica (Fuckel) W.Y.Zhuang (1988)
- Unguiculariopsis peltigericola Etayo (2017)
- Unguiculariopsis ravenelii (Berk. & M.A.Curtis) W.Y.Zhuang & Korf (1987)
- Unguiculariopsis refractiva (Coppins) Coppins (1990)
- Unguiculariopsis rehmii W.Y.Zhuang & Korf (1988)
- Unguiculariopsis thallophila (P.Karst.) W.Y.Zhuang (1988)
- Unguiculariopsis triregia S.Y.Kondr. & D.J.Galloway (1995)
