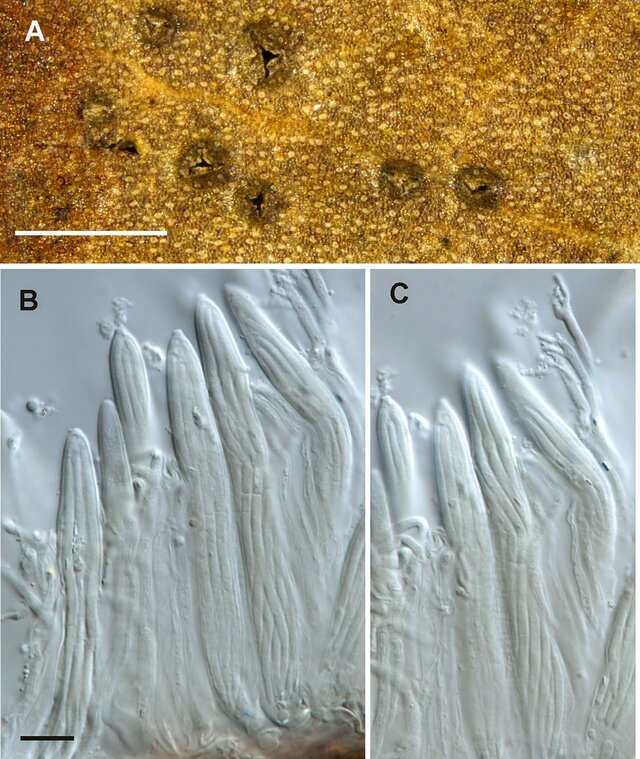
- Marthamyces emarginatus

Scientific classification
- Kingdom: Fungi
- Division: Ascomycota
- Class: Leotiomycetes
- Order: Rhytismatales
- Family: Rhytismataceae
- Genus: Marthamyces; Minter

Type species
- Marthamyces emarginatus (Cooke & Massee) Minter

= Marthamyces =

Genus of fungi

Marthamyces is a genus of fungi within the Rhytismataceae family. The genus contains nine species and is named after American lichenologist Martha Allen Sherwood.
