= Neoechinodiscus kozhevnikovii =

Scientific classification
- Domain: Eukaryota
- Kingdom: Fungi
- Division: Ascomycota
- Class: Leotiomycetes
- Order: Helotiales
- Genus: Neoechinodiscus
- Species: N. kozhevnikovii

Binomial name
- Neoechinodiscus kozhevnikovii (Zhurb.) Molinari & R.Sierra (2020)

Synonyms
- Echinodiscus kozhevnikovii Zhurb. (2009)

Species of lichen

Neoechinodiscus kozhevnikovii is a species of lichenicolous (lichen-eating) fungus in the order Helotiales. It is known to occur in Russia, Austria, and Switzerland, where it grows parasitically on lichens in genus Cetraria.

== Taxonomy ==
The fungus was formally described as new to science in 2009 by lichenologist Mikhail Zhurbenko, who placed it in the genus Echinodiscus. The type specimen was collected by the author at the head of Kaskasnyunjok Creek (in the Khibiny Mountains, Murmansk Oblast); there, at an altitude of 600 m (2,000 ft), the fungus was found growing on Cetraria islandica, which itself was growing on lichen tundra. The species epithet kozhevnikovii honours the late Dr. Yurii Kozhevnikov, a friend of the author and a "devoted explorer of Arctic wildlife".

The taxon was transferred to the genus Neoechinodiscus after it was discovered that Echinodiscus was an illegitimate homonym that had already been used for other taxa. The replacement name Neoechinodiscus was proposed by Rubén Sierra and Eduardo Molinari-Novoa in 2020.

== Description ==
Neoechinodiscus kozhevnikovii produces plate-like (discoid), sessile apothecia that lack a distinct margin and measure 50–150 μm in diameter and about 50 μm in height. The asci are club-shaped (clavate) with a distinct stalk, contains eight spores, and typically measure 40–50 by 9–13 μm. Ascospores are narrowly oblong in shape, hyaline, lack any septa, often contain oil droplets (guttules), and measure 10–12 by 2.5–3.5 μm.

== Habitat and distribution ==
Originally described from mountain and arctic tundras of Russia, Neoechinodiscus kozhevnikovii has also been recorded from the Lepontine Alps of Switzerland, and the Tyrol of Austria. Known hosts for the fungus are Cetraria islandica and Cetraria laevigata.
