= Xerotrema =

Scientific classification
- Kingdom: Fungi
- Division: Ascomycota
- Class: Lecanoromycetes
- Order: Odontotrematales
- Family: Odontotremataceae
- Genus: Xerotrema; Sherwood & Coppins (1980)

Type species
- Xerotrema megalospora Sherwood & Coppins (1980)

Species
- X. megalospora X. quercicola

Genus of fungi

Xerotrema is a small genus of fungi in the family Odontotremataceae. It comprises two species. The genus was circumscribed by Martha Allen Sherwood and Brian John Coppins in 1980. The type species, Xerotrema megalospora, is found in the United States and Canada. X. quercicola was added to the genus in 2008. These fungi produce tiny, deeply cup-shaped fruiting bodies on weathered, barkless wood of conifers and hardwoods in temperate regions. While the genus was originally thought to be non-lichenized, at least one species appears to form facultative partnerships with green algae, meaning it can survive with or without an algal partner.

== Taxonomy ==
Xerotrema was erected by Martha Allen Sherwood and Brian John Coppins in 1980 for a distinctive disc-shaped fungus (an odontotremoid discomycete). Unlike most lichens, which have eight spores per spore sac (ascus), this genus has just one spore per sac. That single spore (ascospore) is unusually large and divided into many cells by walls running in multiple directions (muriform). The type species is X. megalospora, described from material collected in Scotland and the western United States. Sherwood and Coppins separated the genus from Odontotrema on the spore character (one enormous muriform spore per ascus) together with additional microscopic differences from the Odontotrema type (e.g. iodine reaction, epithecial pigmentation, and ascus apex morphology). Sherwood and Coppins also argued that odontotremoid fungi are better treated in the Ostropales rather than the Helotiales, and they presented Xerotrema, with its muriform spore, as further evidence for that placement.

A second species, X. quercicola, was described by Coppins and Aptroot in 2008, who noted that the genus was then being placed in the Odontotremataceae. In the same work they pointed out that X. quercicola has amyloid (I+) muriform ascospores and a green-tinged exciple, features they considered suggestive of an affinity with the Thelotremataceae and therefore reason to re-evaluate the family placement of the genus. The new species is otherwise very similar in external appearance to X. megalospora, and the two were chiefly separated by the iodine reaction of the spores (I+ in X. quercicola, I– in X. megalospora) alongside substrate differences. Sherwood and Coppins discussed occasional associations of Xerotrema with algae but, for bibliographic and nomenclatural reasons, treated such cases as non-lichenised, whereas Coppins and Aptroot later recorded X. megalospora as usually associated with Trentepohlia, i.e. at least facultatively lichenised.

== Description ==
The thallus of Xerotrema species is poorly developed or absent; in some collections it is effectively invisible and the lichenisation is doubtful. By contrast, X. megalospora is usually associated with the green algal genus Trentepohlia, so the genus can be at least facultatively lichenised (able to form, but not requiring, a lichen partnership). The fruiting bodies (apothecia) are tiny, about 0.3–0.6 mm across, and develop within the wood; they begin closed and immersed, then break through and open by a minute, often toothed pore to reveal a deeply cup-shaped (urceolate) disc. The margin is thick and blackened (carbonised) with a rough, crumbly surface, and its inner face bears fine periphysoid hyphae set in a gelatinous matrix. In X. quercicola the margin shows a distinct green tinge in water mounts, and the lower part of the margin gives a positive K/I reaction (a laboratory test using potassium hydroxide followed by iodine). Microscopically, the hymenium has a brown epithecium formed by the tips of slender, septate paraphyses cemented in gel, and the gel does not stain with iodine (I−). Asci are functionally unitunicate (single-walled in action), initially thick-walled but lacking a distinct apical apparatus, and typically contain a single spore; they measure about 140–180 × 35–40 μm. The spores are colourless and muriform—that is, divided by both cross and longitudinal walls into many small chambers—and are unusually large for this group. In X. megalospora they are roughly 90–140 × 22–40 μm. In X. quercicola they are smaller at about 52–98 × 16–28 μm and are amyloid (I+ violet in iodine). In X. megalospora the spores remain I− (do not colour in iodine). A conidial (asexual) state has not been seen in X. quercicola. When mature spores are crushed, their internal chambers can separate, which is consistent with late-formed septa that make the spore appear "brick-walled" under the microscope.

== Habitat and distribution ==
Xerotrema is lignicolous, producing its fruiting bodies on weathered, hard, barkless (decorticated) wood, typically on standing trunks rather than on well-rotted timber. X. megalospora is recorded from Scotland and Oregon (USA), where it grows on decorticated wood of pine (Pinus) and of shrubby Arctostaphylos. In Britain it occurs in the native pinewoods of the Scottish Highlands, on dry, standing, barkless pine trunks. Sherwood and Coppins considered it uncommon and noted that it tends to fruit in late winter, when it is easily overlooked. X. quercicola grows on dry (or rapidly drying), firm lignum of standing, decorticated oak (Quercus) trunks, with records from Wales (Merioneth), western Scotland (Argyll and Westerness) and southern England (Hampshire, New Forest). It characterises former coppiced oak woodland undergoing self-thinning, where scattered whitish, barkless snags provide the required substrate.
