= Lichenopeltella cetrariae =

Scientific classification
- Domain: Eukaryota
- Kingdom: Fungi
- Division: Ascomycota
- Class: Dothideomycetes
- Order: Microthyriales
- Family: Microthyriaceae
- Genus: Lichenopeltella
- Species: L. cetrariae

Binomial name
- Lichenopeltella cetrariae (Bres.) Höhn. (1919)

Synonyms
- Microthyrium cetrariae Bres. (1897)

Species of fungus

Lichenopeltella cetrariae is a species of fungus belonging to the class Dothideomycetes. It has been found growing on Cetraria aculeata in Hrútey near Blönduós, Iceland and on Cetraria laevigata in Bulgan district, Mongolia and Toyama prefecture, Japan. In Japan, it has also been reported growing on Flavocetraria cucullata in Yamanashi prefecture and Nagano prefecture.
