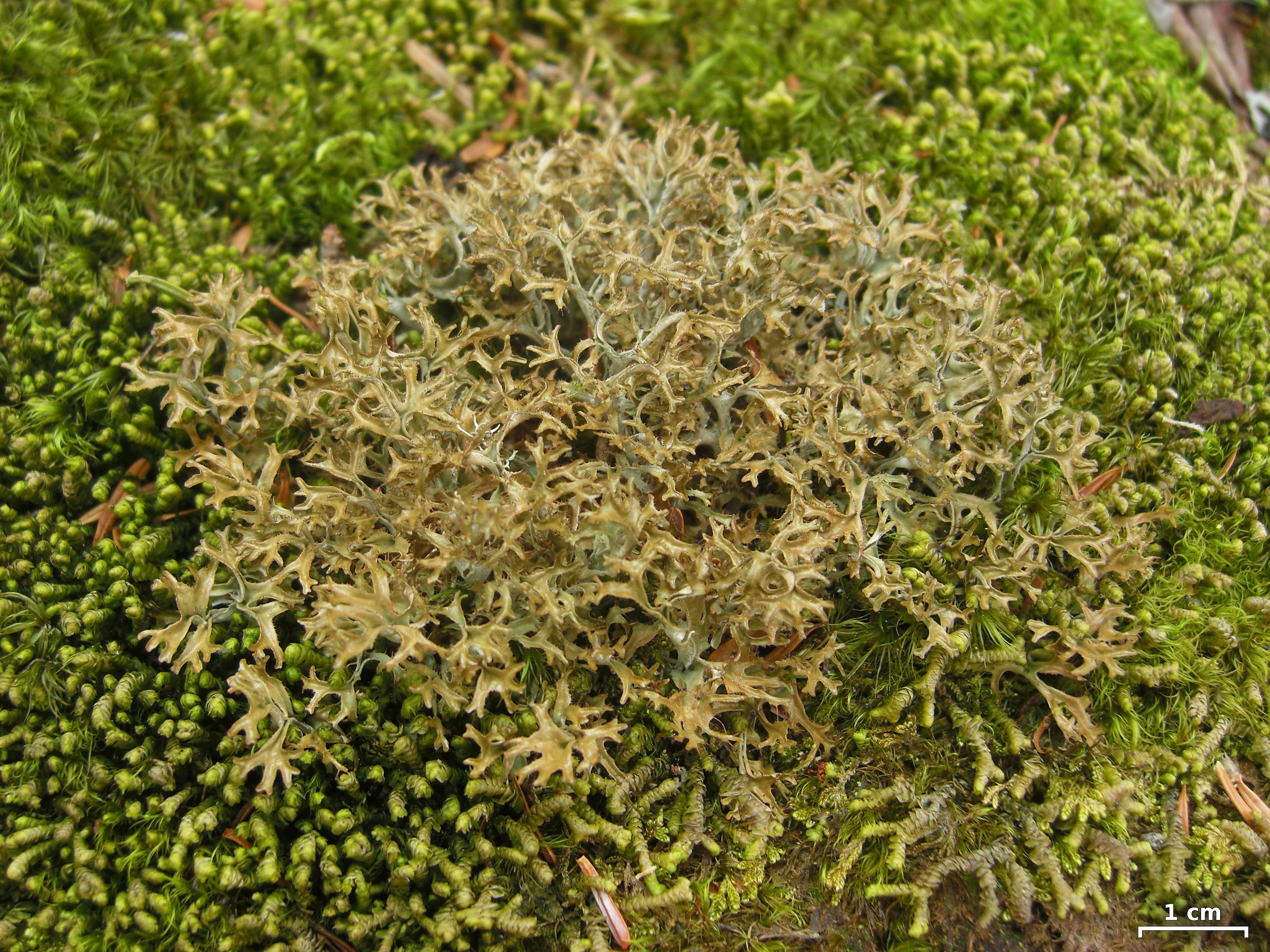

Conservation status
- Secure (NatureServe)

Scientific classification
- Kingdom: Fungi
- Division: Ascomycota
- Class: Lecanoromycetes
- Order: Lecanorales
- Family: Parmeliaceae
- Genus: Cetraria
- Species: C. laevigata

Binomial name
- Cetraria laevigata Rass. (1943)

= Cetraria laevigata =

Species of lichen

Cetraria laevigata is a species of ground-dwelling, fruticose (bushy) lichen in the family Parmeliaceae. It was formally described as a new species by Russian lichenologist Kseniya Aleksandrovna Rassadina in 1943. In North America, it is commonly known as the striped Iceland lichen.

== Description ==
The thallus of Cetraria laevigata is pale brown, with an even paler underside. It comprises smooth and shiny, narrow lobes measuring 1–3 mm across. It has pseudocyphellae (tiny pores for gas exchange) on its margins. The major lichen products in Cetraria laevigata are fumarprotocetraric acid, protolichesterinic acid, and lichesterinic acids. The expected results of standard lichen spot tests on the medulla are PD+ (red), K−, KC−, and C−.

== Distribution ==
Cetraria laevigata has an amphiberingian distribution pattern (i.e., on both sides of the Bering Strait), and is found in North America, from Alaska through upper Canada, as well as in eastern Siberia. In the Himalayas, the lichen has been recorded growing at elevations of up to 3,950 m (12,960 ft).

== Species interactions ==
Perigrapha cetrariae is a lichenicolous fungus that grows on Cetraria laevigata. This fungus, described from specimens collected in Japan, does not visibly damage the host thallus or induce galls. Echinodiscus kozhevnikovii is a lichenicolous fungus that has been recorded growing on Cetraria laevigata in the Magadan Oblast region of the Russian Far East, while Lichenoconium erodens, Clypeococcum cetrariae, Lichenopeltella cetrariae, and Katherinomyces cetrariae have been recorded parasitising C. laevigata from Mongolia.
