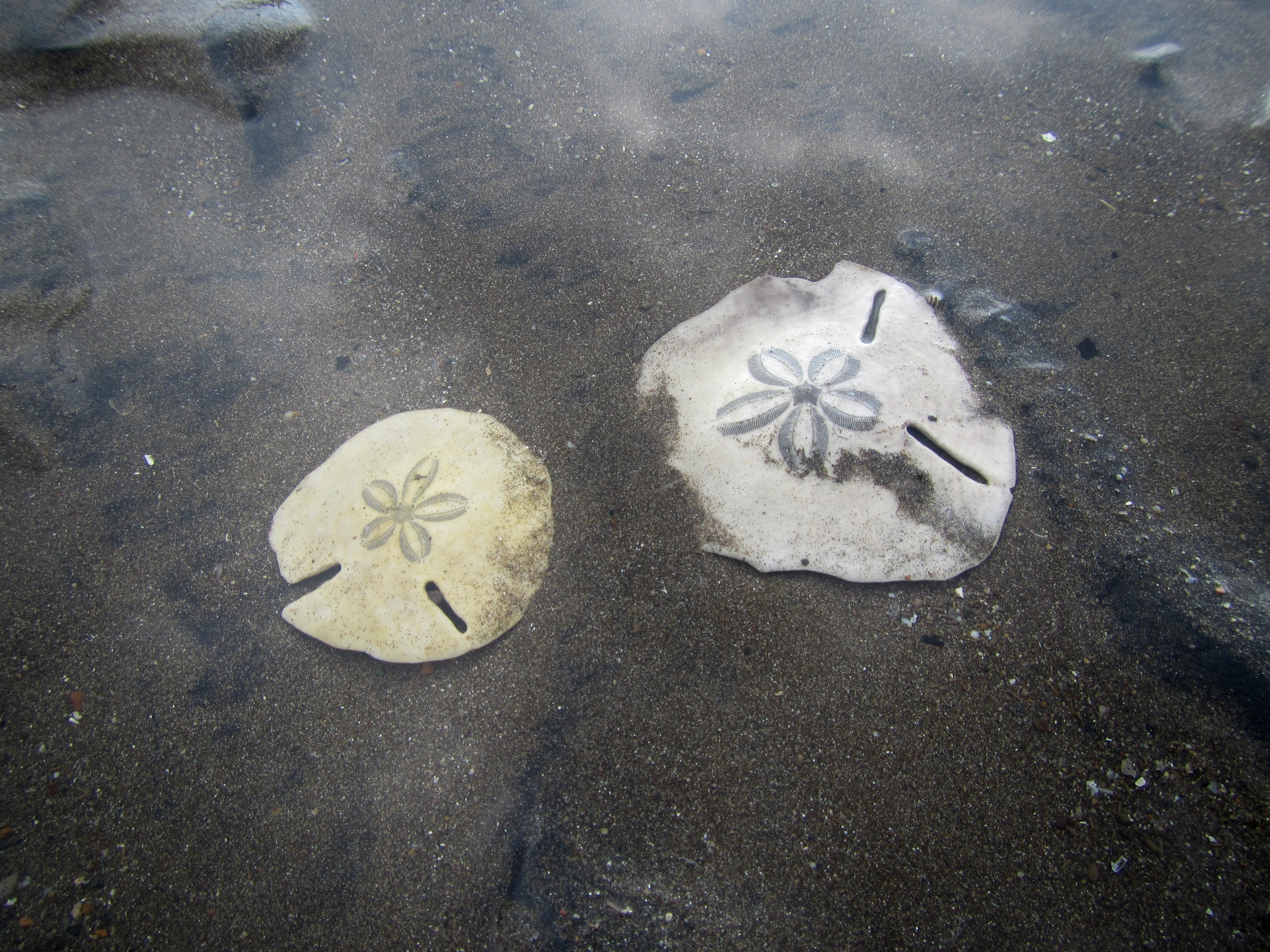

Scientific classification
- Kingdom: Animalia
- Phylum: Echinodermata
- Class: Echinoidea
- Order: Clypeasteroida
- Family: Astriclypeidae
- Genus: Echinodiscus
- Species: E. bisperforatus

Binomial name
- Echinodiscus bisperforatus Leske, 1778

= Echinodiscus bisperforatus =

Species of sand dollar

Echinodiscus bisperforatus is a species of sand dollar described by Nathanael Gottfried Leske in 1778. The species is found throughout the Indo-Pacific in the Red Sea and off the coasts of south and east South Africa, Thailand, Malayan Archipelago, and New Caledonia at depths up to 20 meters. It grows to lengths of 11.8 centimeters.
