= Rhymbocarpus =

Scientific classification
- Domain: Eukaryota
- Kingdom: Fungi
- Division: Ascomycota
- Class: Leotiomycetes
- Order: Cyttariales
- Family: Cordieritidaceae
- Genus: Rhymbocarpus; Zopf (1896)

Type species
- Rhymbocarpus punctiformis Zopf (1896)

Genus of fungi

Rhymbocarpus is a genus of lichenicolous (lichen-dwelling) fungi in the family Cordieritidaceae. It has 10 species. The genus was circumscribed by German mycologist Friedrich Wilhelm Zopf in 1896, with Rhymbocarpus punctiformis assigned as the type species.

== Species ==
- Rhymbocarpus aggregatus Etayo & Diederich (2011) – host: Buellia griseovirens
- Rhymbocarpus boomii Etayo & Diederich (2000) – Dirina ceratoniae
- Rhymbocarpus cruciatus (Sherwood, D.Hawksw. & Coppins) Etayo & Diederich (2000) – Diploicia canescens
- Rhymbocarpus ericetorum (Flot. ex Körb.) Etayo, Diederich & Ertz (2010) – on Dibaeis baeomyces
- Rhymbocarpus makarovae Diederich & Etayo (2000) – Porpidia
- Rhymbocarpus neglectus (Vain.) Diederich & Etayo (2000) – on the Lepraria neglecta species group
- Rhymbocarpus pertusariae Diederich, Zhurb. & Etayo (2000) – on Lepra panyrga
- Rhymbocarpus pubescens (Etayo & Diederich) Diederich & Etayo (2000) – Lepraria
- Rhymbocarpus punctiformis Zopf (1896)
- Rhymbocarpus roccellae (Etayo, Paz-Berm. & Diederich) Etayo, Diederich & Ertz (2010) – Roccella

Host information is from Diederich (2018).

Former Rhymbocarpus species:

- Rhymbocarpus elachistophorus (Nyl.) Triebel (1989) is now Skyttea elachistophora
- Rhymbocarpus fuscoatrae (Hafellner) Diederich & Etayo (2000) is now Llimoniella fuscoatrae
- Rhymbocarpus gregarius (Sherwood, D.Hawksw. & Coppins) Triebel (1989) is now Skyttea gregaria
- Rhymbocarpus nitschkei (Körb.) Triebel (1989) is now Skyttea nitschkei
- Rhymbocarpus stereocaulorum (Alstrup & D. Hawksw.) Etayo & Diederich (2000) is now Llimoniella stereocaulorum
