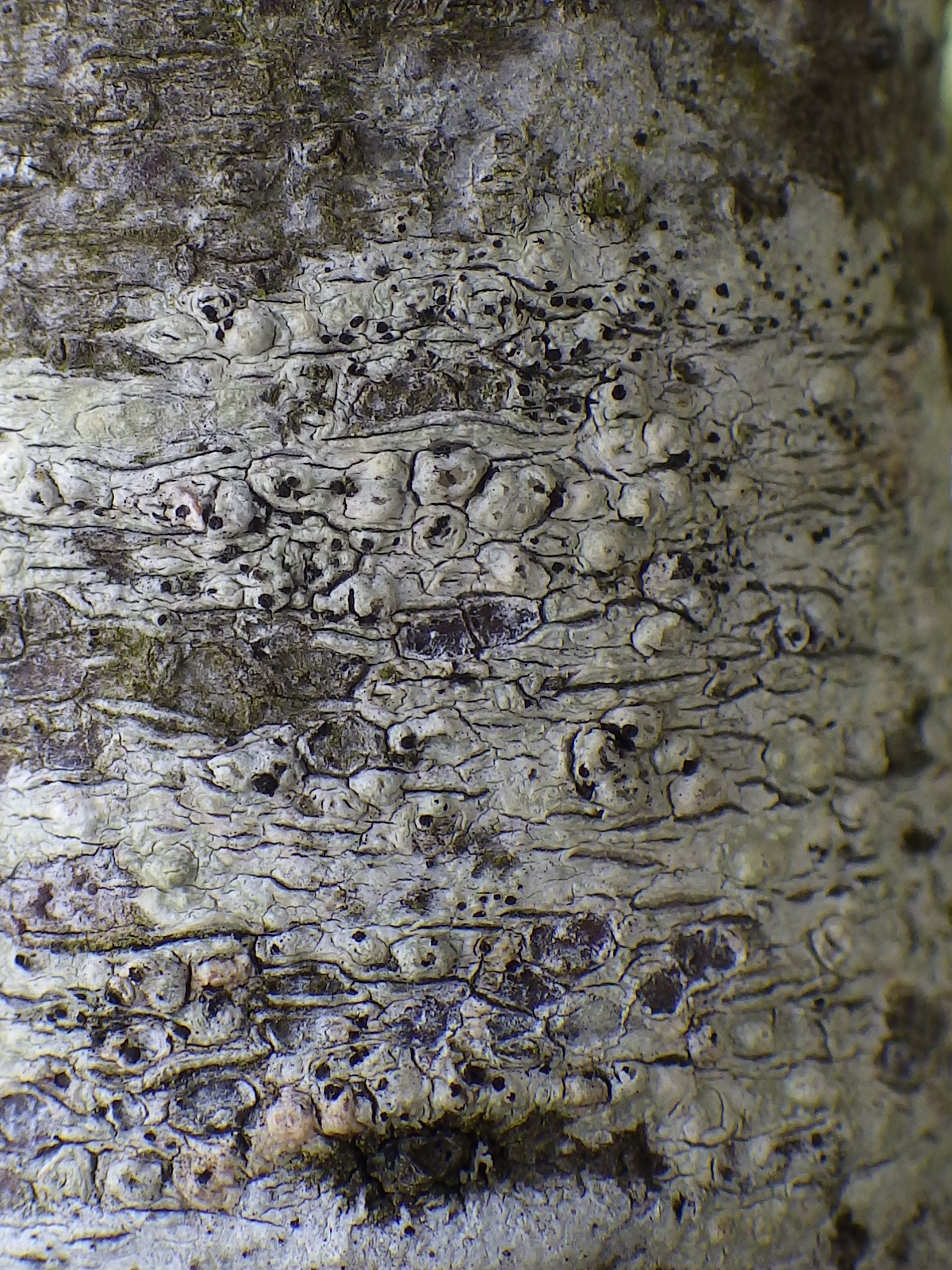
- Skyttea pertusariicola growing on a Pertusaria lichen

Scientific classification
- Kingdom: Fungi
- Division: Ascomycota
- Class: Leotiomycetes
- Order: Cyttariales
- Family: Cordieritidaceae
- Genus: Skyttea; Sherwood, D.Hawksw. & Coppins (1981)

Type species
- Skyttea nitschkei (Körb.) Sherwood, D.Hawksw. & Coppins (1981)

Species
- See text

= Skyttea =

Genus of fungi

Skyttea is a genus of lichenicolous (lichen-dwelling) fungi in the family Cordieritidaceae.

== Taxonomy ==
The genus was circumscribed in 1981 by the lichenologists Martha Allen Sherwood, David L. Hawksworth, and Brian J. Coppins, with Skyttea nitschkei assigned as the type species. The genus name Skyttea honours Mogens Skytte Christiansen (1918–1996), a Danish botanist and lichenologist.

== Description ==
Skyttea is a genus of fungi that grows parasitically on lichens (lichenicolous fungi) but appears to do little harm to its host. The fungus produces tiny, dark-coloured reproductive structures (ascocarps) that are initially embedded within the host lichen's tissue before emerging to the surface. These structures are cup-shaped (urceolate) and typically measure between 0.1–0.4 mm in diameter.

A distinctive feature of Skyttea is the presence of specialised smooth hairs that line the inner edge of the reproductive structures. These hairs appear to help regulate the opening and closing of the structure in response to moisture levels. The outer wall (excipulum) of the reproductive structure can range from dark brown to olive green in colour and is made up of small, tightly packed cells.

Inside the reproductive structures, Skyttea produces spore-containing sacs called asci. Each ascus typically contains eight spores (ascospores), which can be oval to narrowly ellipsoid in shape and are usually colourless (hyaline). The spores may be single-celled or divided into multiple cells by cross-walls (septa).

The genus appears to prefer growing on specific lichen species, with different Skyttea species typically being restricted to particular host lichens. While the fungus lives on these lichens, it generally doesn't seem to harm them significantly, as even heavily infected lichen hosts usually appear healthy. This suggests Skyttea has a parasitic relationship with its hosts that doesn't severely impact the lichen's health (parasymbiotic).

== Habitat and distribution ==
Species within the genus are most commonly found in temperate regions with oceanic climates, particularly in areas with long-established forests. In the British Isles, they are primarily found in southern and western regions.

== Species ==
- Skyttea anziae Etayo & Diederich (2002)
- Skyttea arenicola Alstrup & E.S.Hansen (2001)
- Skyttea buelliae Sherwood, D.Hawksw. & Coppins (1981)
- Skyttea bumyoungsungii S.Y.Kondr. & Hur (2018)
- Skyttea caesii Diederich & Etayo (2000)
- Skyttea carboneae Diederich & Etayo (2000)
- Skyttea cismonicae Hafellner (2000)
- Skyttea dacampiae Zhurb. (2007)
- Skyttea elachistophora (Nyl.) Sherwood & D.Hawksw. (1981)
- Skyttea fusispora Sherwood, D.Hawksw. & Coppins (1981)
- Skyttea gossypina Etayo (2010)
- Skyttea graphidicola Diederich, Common & Suija (2019)
- Skyttea gregaria Sherwood, D.Hawksw. & Coppins (1981)
- Skyttea hawksworthii Diederich (1986)
- Skyttea heterochroae Nav.-Ros. & D.Muñiz (2009)
- Skyttea insignis Driscoll, S.R.Clayden & R.C.Harris (2016)
- Skyttea lecanorae Diederich & Etayo (2000)
- Skyttea mayrhoferi Diederich & Etayo (2000)
- Skyttea megalosporae Etayo & Diederich (1998)
- Skyttea nitschkei (Körb.) Sherwood, D.Hawksw. & Coppins (1981)
- Skyttea ochrolechiae Zhurb. (2015)
- Skyttea pertusariicola Diederich & Etayo (2004)
- Skyttea pyrenulae Diederich, Etayo & Coppins (2000)
- Skyttea radiatilis (Tuck.) R.Sant., Etayo & Diederich (2000)
- Skyttea recognita Etayo & Diederich (2017)
- Skyttea richardsonii Iturr. & D.Hawksw. (2004)
- Skyttea spinosa D.Hawksw. & Coppins (1982)
- Skyttea tavaresae R.Sant., Etayo & Diederich (2000)
- Skyttea thelotrematis Diederich & Etayo (2000)
- Skyttea violacea Etayo (2008)
- Skyttea viridis D.Hawksw. & Coppins (1982)
