= Martha Allen Sherwood =

American lichenologist (1948–2020)

- Born: November 8, 1948; Eugene, Oregon, United States
- Died: October 19, 2020 (aged 71); Eugene, Oregon, United States
- Education: University of Oregon; Cornell University (PhD)
- Known for: Circumscribed the genus Xerotrema
- Spouse: Lawrence Herbert Pike
- Scientific career
- Fields: Mycology, Lichenology
- Workplaces: Farlow Herbarium of Cryptogamic Botany, Harvard University; Mycological Society of America; University of Liverpool; University of Oregon
- Thesis: The ostropalean fungi (1977)

Martha Allen Sherwood (November 8, 1948 – October 19, 2020) was an American lichenologist and mycologist. She circumscribed the genus Xerotrema with Brian John Coppins and the genus Marthamyces is named after her.

== Biography ==
Sherwood was born on November 8, 1948 in Eugene, Oregon, United States. Her parents were University of Oregon professors John Sherwood and Irma Sherwood.

Sherwood studied at the University of Oregon and went on a field expedition to Guadeloupe in the French West Indies while a student. She achieved her PhD at Cornell University in 1977, working under Richard Korf. Her thesis work was on ostropalean fungi, which was published in the scientific journal Mycotaxon. As a post-doctoral position, Sherwood worked at the Farlow Herbarium of Cryptogamic Botany at Harvard University and with local amateur lichenologists.In 1979 she issued the exsiccata Phacidiales exsiccati.

Sherwood was a member of the Mycological Society of America (MSA) and edited the Society's journal newsletter from January 1979 to August 1980. Sherwood circumscribed the genus of Xerotrema with Brian John Coppins in 1980. The genus Marthamyces (within the Rhytismataceae family) is named after her.

Sherwood moved to England, where she worked at the University of Liverpool and contributed to the book The British Ascomycotina. An Annotated Checklist (Cannon et al. 1985). After returning to the United States, Sherwood married biologist and organic farmer Lawrence Herbert Pike and attended the Central Lutheran Church in Eugene, Oregon.

Sherwood worked in the Department of Biology at the University of Oregon. She collaborated with palaeobotanist Jane Gray on research about fossil fungi (published under the name Sherwood-Pike), interpreting fossilised faecal pellets containing fungal hyphae as implying the existence of a fungivorous microarthropod.

Sherwood died on October 19, 2020 in Eugene, Oregon, aged 71, after suffering from a stroke.

== Select publications ==
- Sherwood, M. A. (1977) The ostropalean fungi. Mycotaxon 5(1): 1–277.
- Hawksworth, D. L. & Sherwood, M. A. 1981. Proposals for Nomina Conservanda and Rejicienda for Ascomycete Names (Lichenized and Non-Lichenized). Taxon: The Journal of the International Association for Plant Taxonomy 30(1): 338–348.
- Hawksworth, D. L. and Sherwood, M. A. (1982) Two new families in the Ascomycomycotina. - Mycotaxon 16: 262–264. [Families: Ascodichaenaceae, Odontotremataceae]
- Sherwood, M.A. and Coppins, B. J. (1980) Xerotrema, a new genus of ondontotremoid fungus from Scotland. - Notes from the Royal Botanic Garden Edinburgh 38: 367–371. [Xerotrema gen. nov.; X. megalospora sp. nov.]
- Sherwood, M. A., Hawksworth, D. L. and Coppins, B. J. (1980) Skyttea, a new genus of odontotremoid lichenicolous fungi. - Transactions of the British Mycological Society 75: 479–490. [Skyttea gen. nov., S. buelliae sp. nov., S. cruciata sp. nov., S. elachistophora (Nyl.) Sherw. & D. Hawksw., comb. nov.; S. fusispora sp. nov.; S. gregaria sp. nov.; S. nitschkei (Körber) comb. nov. and S. thallophila (P. Karsten) Sherw. & D. Hawksw., comb. nov.]
- Sherwood-Pike, M. (1985) New and unusual Ascomycetes from the western United States. - Sydowia II 38: 267–277. [Nanostictis pseudocyphellariae sp. nov., from Oregon.]
- Sherwood-Pike, M. A. (1987) The Ostropalean Fungi III: the Odontotremataceae. - Mycotaxon 28: 137–177.[Ocellularia concentricum (Stirton) comb. nov.; Paschelkiella gen. nov.; Phragmiticola gen. nov.; Odontotrema oregonense sp. nov.]
