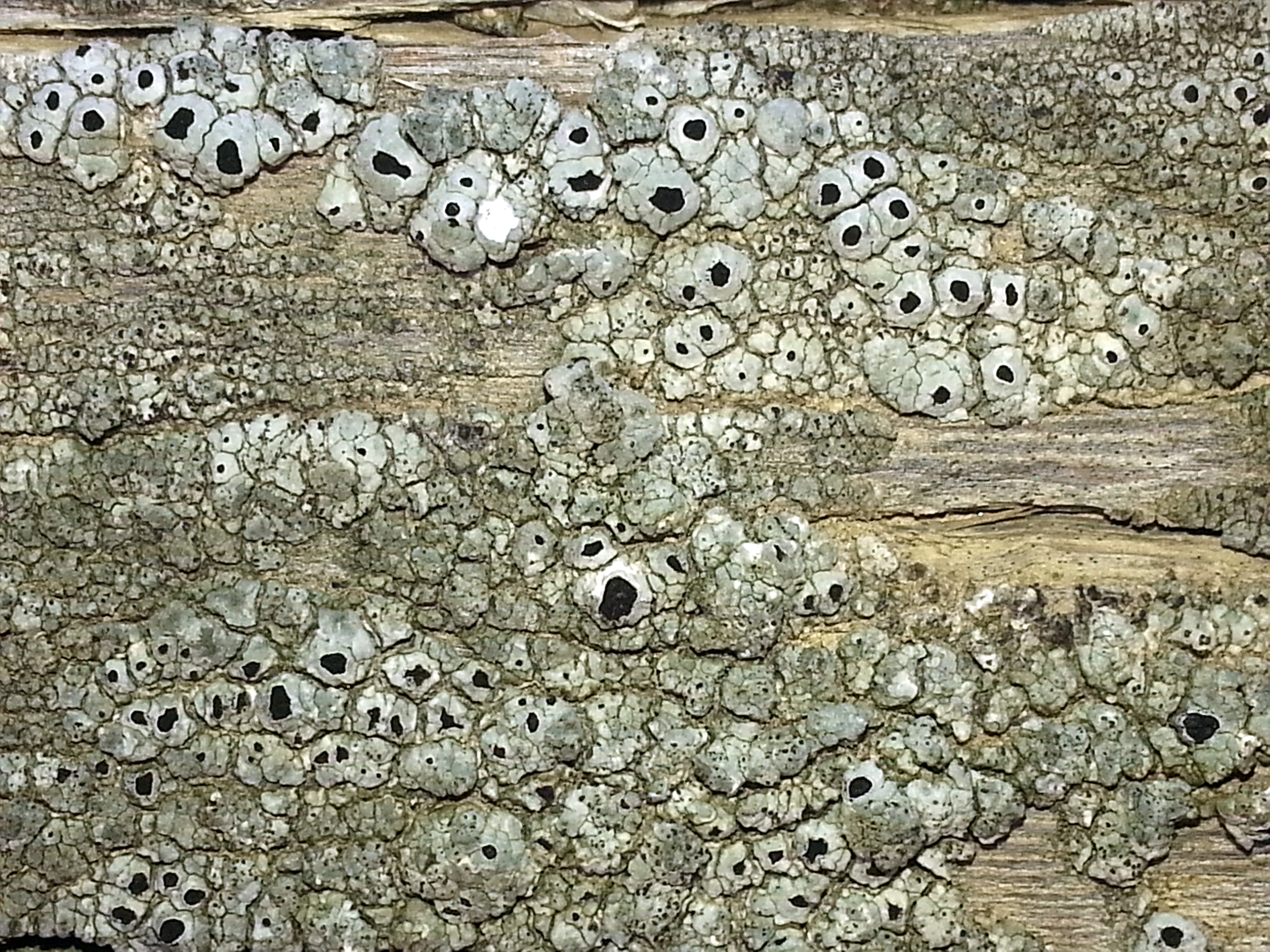

Scientific classification
- Domain: Eukaryota
- Kingdom: Fungi
- Division: Ascomycota
- Class: Lecanoromycetes
- Order: Caliciales
- Family: Caliciaceae
- Genus: Pseudothelomma
- Species: P. occidentale

Binomial name
- Pseudothelomma occidentale (Herre) M.Prieto & Wedin (2016)

Synonyms
- Cyphelium occidentale Herre (1910); Thelomma occidentale (Herre) Tibell (1976)

= Pseudothelomma occidentale =

Species of lichen

Pseudothelomma occidentale is a species of corticolous (bark-dwelling), crustose lichen in the family Caliciaceae. It was first formally described by Albert William Herre in 1910, who initially classified it in the genus Cyphelium. Leif Tibell transferred it to Thelomma in 1976. In 2016, María Prieto and Mats Wedin transferred the taxon to the newly circumscribed genus Pseudothelomma.

In his original description of the lichen, Herre identified Cyphelium occidentalis as a new species, previously determined as an Acolium species by Hasse in 1902. He described the thallus as determinate, forming either rounded or oval patches, or spreading extensively, composed of thick areoles with surfaces of many small nodules, creating a deeply fissured, chinky crust of whitish or ashy-grey colour, not reacting to KOH or CaCl_{2} tests. The apothecia were noted to be innate in swollen warts, varying in size from small to large, with a black disc and a thick, white, often concealed margin. Herre highlighted its distinctively long, slender paraphyses, a broader thecium base marked by a wide, brown-black band, and bilocular, strongly constricted spores with an oblong-ellipsoid shape. He reported that this species historically grew on old wooden fences in mountainous and foothill regions, although its original habitats had been replaced by wire fencing. The lichen was noted for leaving black marks on the fingers when touched, a characteristic shared with other species within the original genus Cyphelium.
