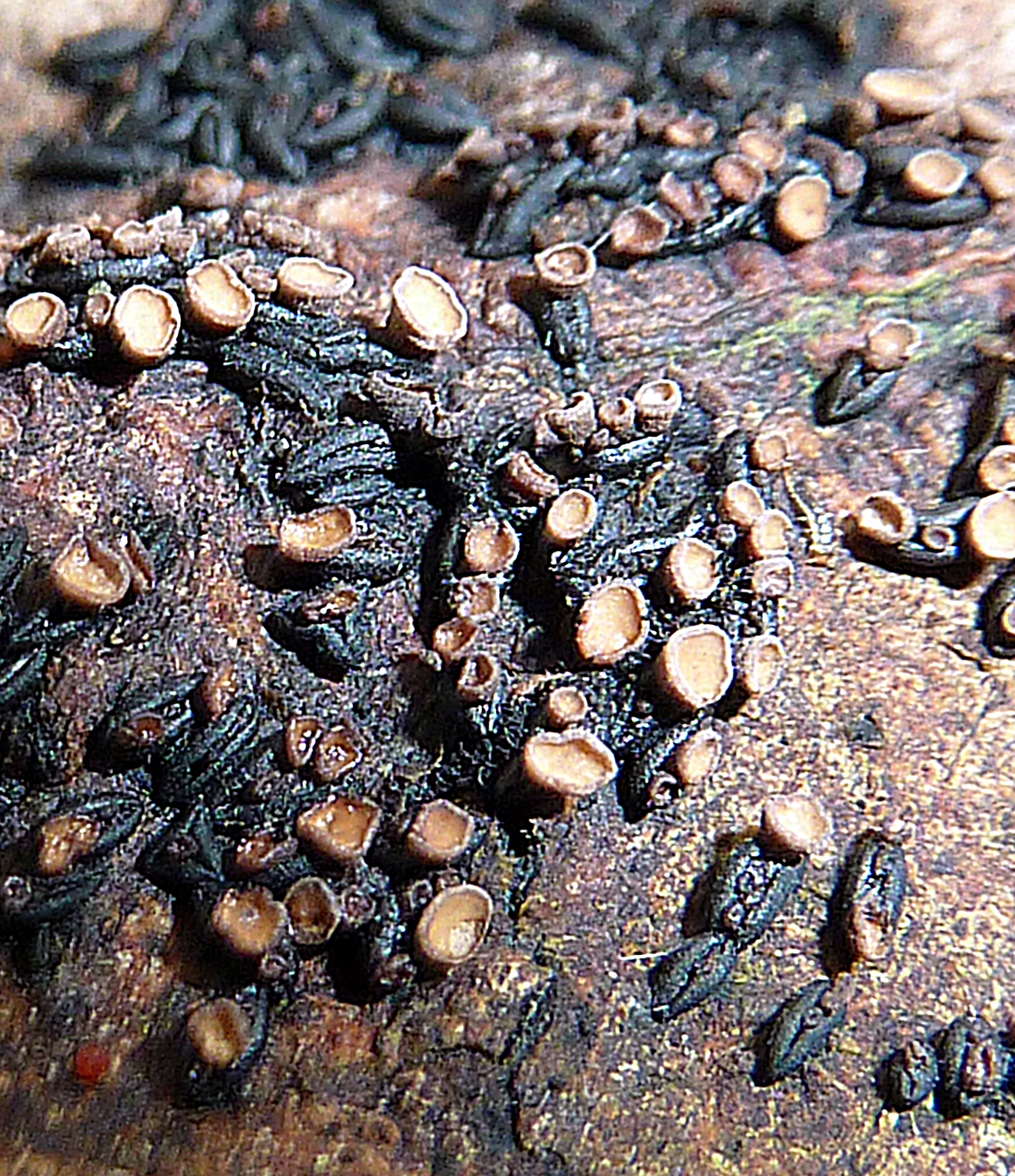
- Unguiculariopsis ravenelii

Scientific classification
- Kingdom: Fungi
- Division: Ascomycota
- Class: Leotiomycetes
- Order: Cyttariales
- Family: Cordieritidaceae; Sacc. (1889)

Type genus
- Cordierites Mont. (1840)

= Cordieritidaceae =

Family of fungi

Cordieritidaceae is a family of fungi in the order Cyttariales. Species in this family are saprobes or lichenicolous.

== Description ==
The ascomata of Cordieritidaceae species are apothecial, and range in shape from disc-shaped, cup-shaped, funnel-shaped, to ear-shaped. They are either sessile or stipitate, sometimes arising from a common base or from branched stipes with a dark stroma, and they are sometimes covered with hairs.

== Genera ==
- Ameghiniella Speg. (1887) – 2 spp.
- Amylogalla Suija, Motiej. & Kantvilas (2019) – 1 sp.
- Annabella Fryar, Haelew. & D.E.A. Catches. (2019) – 1 sp.
- Austrocenangium Gamundí (1997) – 2 spp.
- Cordierites Mont. (1840) – 6 spp.
- Diplocarpa Massee (1895) – 1 sp.
- Diplolaeviopsis Giralt & D.Hawksw. (1991) – 3 spp.
- Gelatinopsis Rambold & Triebel (1990) – 1 sp.
- Ionomidotis E.J.Durand ex Thaxt. (1923) – 4 spp.
- Llimoniella Hafellner & Nav.-Ros. (1993) – 21 spp.
- Macroskyttea Etayo, Flakus, Suija & Kukwa (2015) – 1 sp.
- Midotiopsis Henn. (1902) – 2 spp.
- Phaeangella (Sacc.) Massee (1895) – 13 spp.
- Rhizocladosporium Crous & U.Braun (2007) – 1 spp.
- Rhymbocarpus Zopf (1896) – 10 spp.
- Sabahriopsis Crous & M.J.Wingf. (2015) – 1 sp.
- Skyttea Sherwood, D.Hawksw. & Coppins (1981) – 36 spp.
- Skyttella D.Hawksw. & R.Sant. (1988) – 2 spp.
- Thamnogalla D.Hawksw. (1980) – 1 sp.
- Unguiculariopsis Rehm (1909) – ca. 40 spp.
- Unguiculella Höhn. (1906) – 15 spp.
