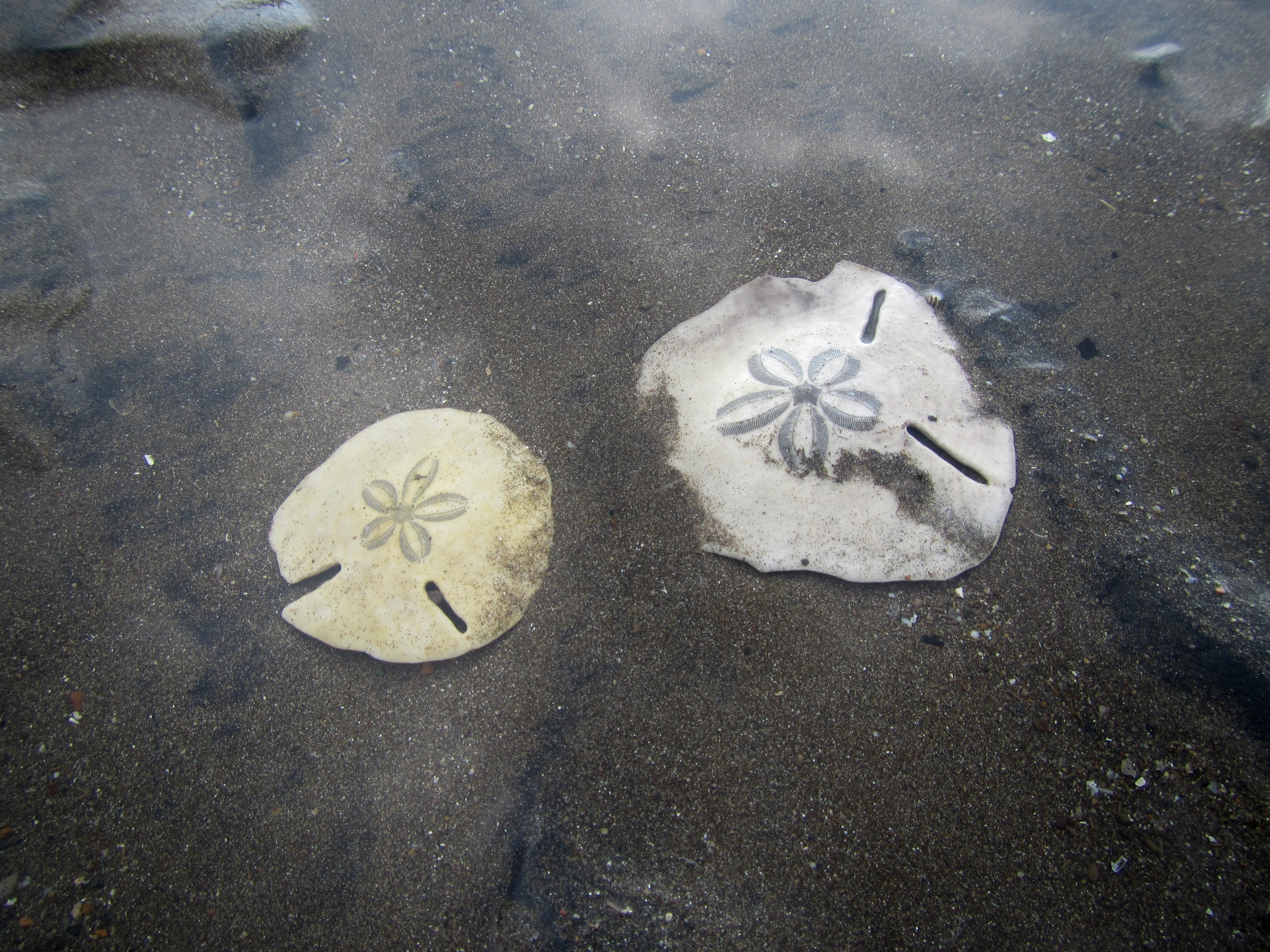
- Echinodiscus bisperforatus

Scientific classification
- Kingdom: Animalia
- Phylum: Echinodermata
- Class: Echinoidea
- Order: Clypeasteroida
- Family: Astriclypeidae
- Genus: Echinodiscus; Leske, 1778

Type species
- Echinodiscus bisperforatus Leske, 1778

Synonyms
- Lobophora L. Agassiz, 1841; Tetrodiscus Pomel, 1883

= Echinodiscus (echinoderm) =

Genus of sand dollars

Echinodiscus is a genus of sand dollars within the family Astriclypeidae. There are currently 14 species assigned to the genus, with a majority being extinct.

== Species ==
- Echinodiscus andamanensis Stara & Sanciu, 2014
- Echinodiscus bisperforatus Leske, 1778
- †Echinodiscus chikuzenensis Nagao, 1928
- †Echinodiscus colchesterensis Smuts, 1988
- †Echinodiscus ellipticus Duncan & Sladen, 1883
- †Echinodiscus formosus Wang, 1984
- †Echinodiscus ginauensis Clegg, 1933
- †Echinodiscus hsianglanensis Wang, 1986
- †Echinodiscus pedemontanus (Airaghi, 1899)
- †Echinodiscus placenta Duncan & Sladen, 1883
- †Echinodiscus tiliensis Wang, 1984
- †Echinodiscus transiens Nisiyama, 1968
- Echinodiscus truncatus (L. Agassiz, 1841)
- †Echinodiscus yeliuensis Wang, 1982
