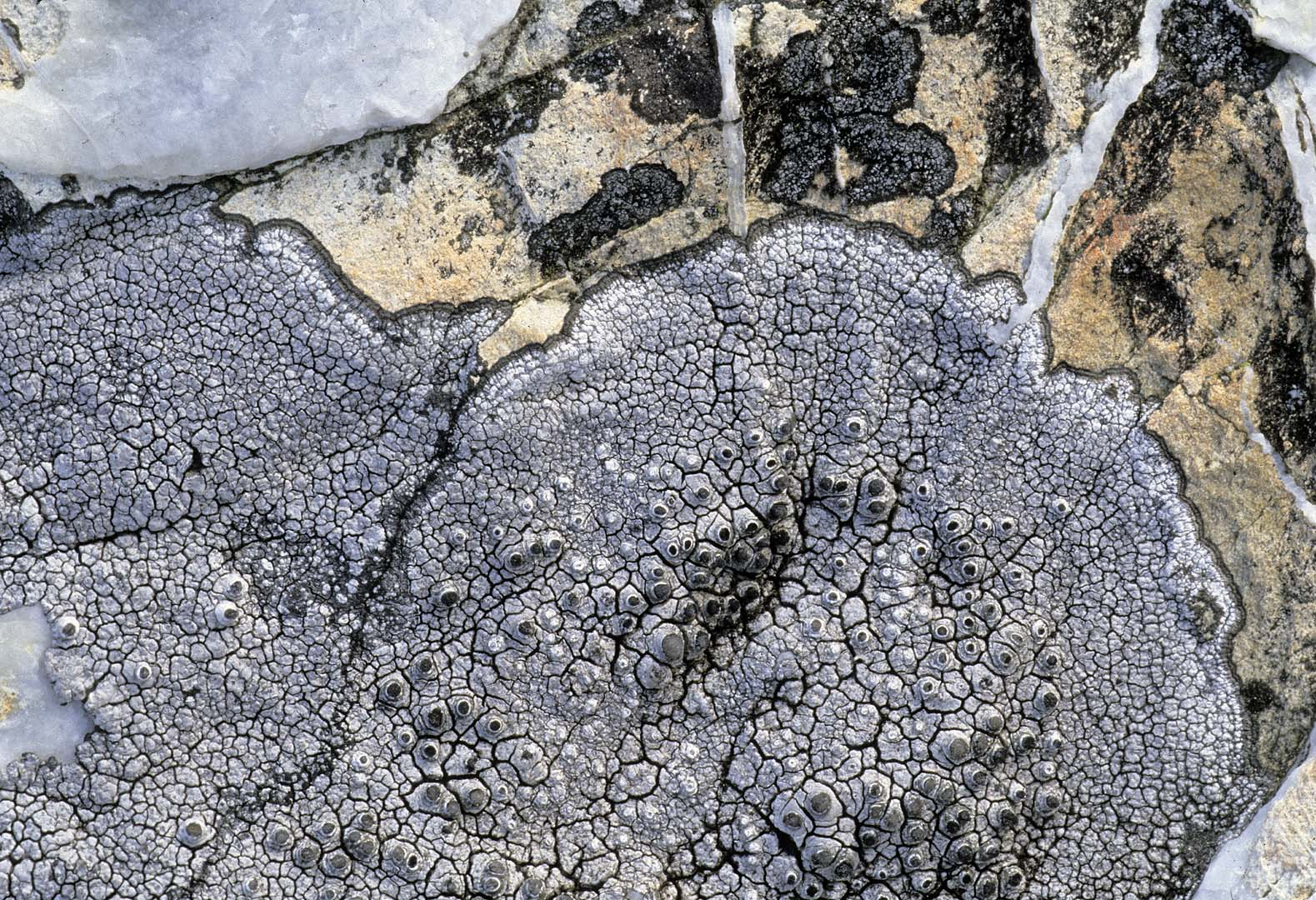
- Thelomma mammosum

Scientific classification
- Domain: Eukaryota
- Kingdom: Fungi
- Division: Ascomycota
- Class: Lecanoromycetes
- Order: Caliciales
- Family: Caliciaceae
- Genus: Thelomma; A.Massal. (1860)

Type species
- Thelomma mammosum (Hepp) A.Massal. (1860)

Species
- T. californicum T. carolinianum T. mammosum T. occidentale T. ocellatum T. santessonii

= Thelomma =

Genus of lichens in the family Caliciaceae

Thelomma is a genus of lichenized fungi in the family Caliciaceae. The genus is widely distributed and contains seven species. Thelomma was circumscribed by Italian lichenologist Abramo Bartolommeo Massalongo in 1860.
