= Westernesse =

Westernesse is a fictional kingdom in the Middle English romance of King Horn. It also featured in the writings of Tolkien as a translation of Númenor, a realm in Middle-earth.

== King Horn ==
In King Horn, Westernesse can be reached by sea, and is ruled by King Almair. The throne eventually passes to Arnoldin, who is a loyal companion of the narrative's hero, Horn.

Whether or not Westernesse should be identified with one or more real-world locations remains, however, a point of dispute, since the narrative contains little geographic detail, and only vaguely echoes historical events. It has been associated with various regions in the British Isles, among which are the Isle of Man and the Wirral district in Cheshire.

== Tolkien ==
The name "Westernesse" is J. R. R. Tolkien's translation of Númenor, a realm of his fictional world Middle-earth. Tolkien, who studied Middle English texts professionally, wrote "I have often used Westernesse as a translation. This is derived from rare Middle English Westernesse (known to me only in MS. C of King Horn) where the meaning is vague, but may be taken to mean 'Western lands' as distinct from the East inhabited by the Paynim and Saracens."
