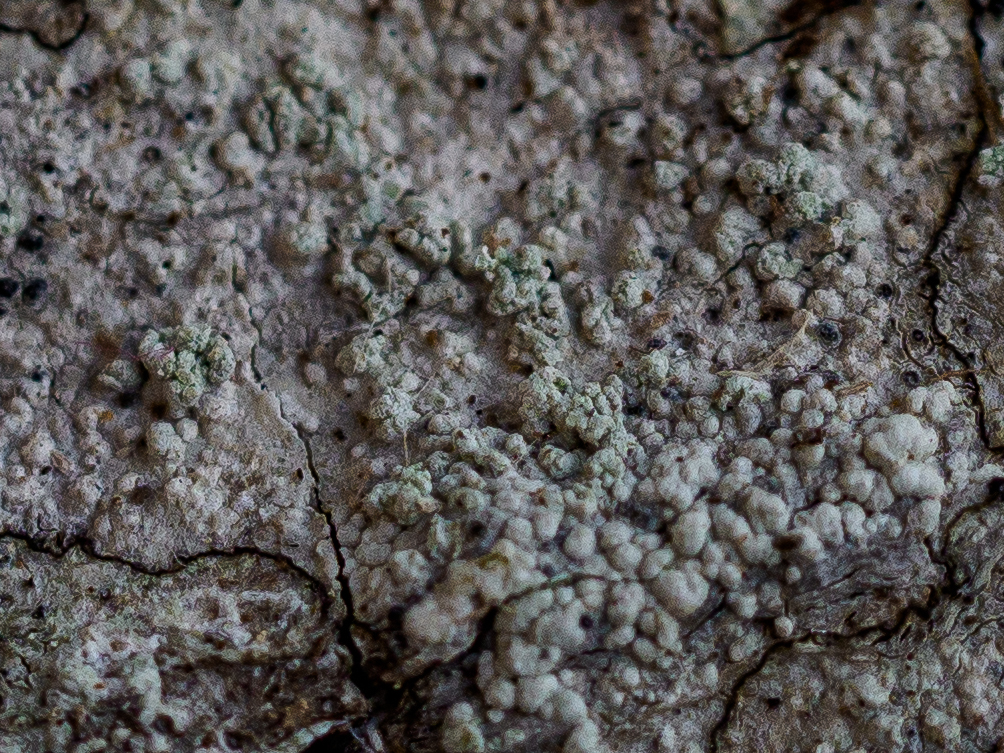

Conservation status
- Unranked (NatureServe)

Scientific classification
- Kingdom: Fungi
- Division: Ascomycota
- Class: Lecanoromycetes
- Order: Caliciales
- Family: Caliciaceae
- Genus: Buellia
- Species: B. griseovirens

Binomial name
- Buellia griseovirens (Turner & Borrer ex Sm.) Almb.

= Buellia griseovirens =

Species of fungus

Buellia griseovirens (a type of button lichen) is a species of lichen belonging to the family Caliciaceae. (Note: Some sources, such as NatureServe describe the family as Physciaceae.) It exhibits a crustose growth type and is commonly found on well-lit, smooth bark, and worked timber surfaces. The species can tolerate moderate pollution.

== Description ==
The thallus of Buellia griseovirens varies from immersed to thick, often pale grey with a black prothallus. They may be continuous or lacking, sometimes minutely cracked. It features scattered, crowded, or confluent grey-green soralia. Soralia are numerous, seldom confluent, often forming a mosaic up to 2 mm in diameter. The soredia, characterized by their powdery texture, are minute, measuring less than 0.01 mm in diameter. When newly collected, they exhibit a greenish-grey coloration, which fades to a pale yellowish-grey hue as they age in storage. These soredia are typically enclosed within circular, flat, or slightly convex soralia.

Apothecia are very rare. The spores are irregularly 3-septate to sub-muriform. Initially, the apothecia are attached directly to the substrate (sessile) and appear flat with a distinct raised margin. As they mature, they become convex and lose their margin, blending seamlessly with the surrounding surface. The epithecium is dark brown. The hymenium is colorless and measures 110-120 μm tall. The hypothecium is dark brown. Asci are clavate, measuring 110 × 15 μm. Ascospores are pseudomuriform, ellipsoid, and measure (13-)15-28 × 7-13 μm.

== Chemistry ==
The chemistry of Buellia griseovirens is characterized by various compounds found in its thallus and medulla. Spot tests reveal that the thallus and medulla turn K+ yellow, indicating the presence of certain chemical compounds. The thallus and medulla also show P+ yellow-orange reaction, while C− reaction is more common, although it may occasionally show C+ orange reaction.

== Distribution ==
Buellia griseovirens is distributed in Europe, Mediterranean Africa, the Middle East, and North America, including montane areas of southern California (Riverside and Los Angeles Counties). In Canada, it is found in Alberta, British Columbia, Nova Scotia, Ontario, and the Yukon Territory. In the United States, it occurs in Montana and Wyoming. It is also found in New Zealand.

== Conservation status ==
The conservation status of Buellia griseovirens is assessed by various organizations, including NatureServe. In Canada, the species holds a National Status of N5, denoting its widespread occurrence and overall security. Additionally, it holds a Subnational Status of S5 in British Columbia, indicating its abundance and stability within the province.

== Similar species ==
Buellia griseovirens may be confused with other lichen species such as Mycoblastus fucatus and Mycoblastus caesius due to similarities in appearance. However, they can be distinguished based on chemical composition.
