= Gelatinopsis =

Scientific classification
- Kingdom: Fungi
- Division: Ascomycota
- Class: Leotiomycetes
- Order: Helotiales
- Family: Helotiaceae
- Genus: Gelatinopsis; Rambold & Triebel

Type species
- Gelatinopsis geoglossi (Ellis & Everh.) Rambold & Triebel

Genus of fungi

Gelatinopsis is a genus of fungi in the family Helotiaceae; according to the 2007 Outline of Ascomycota, the placement in this family is uncertain. The genus contains 2 species.
