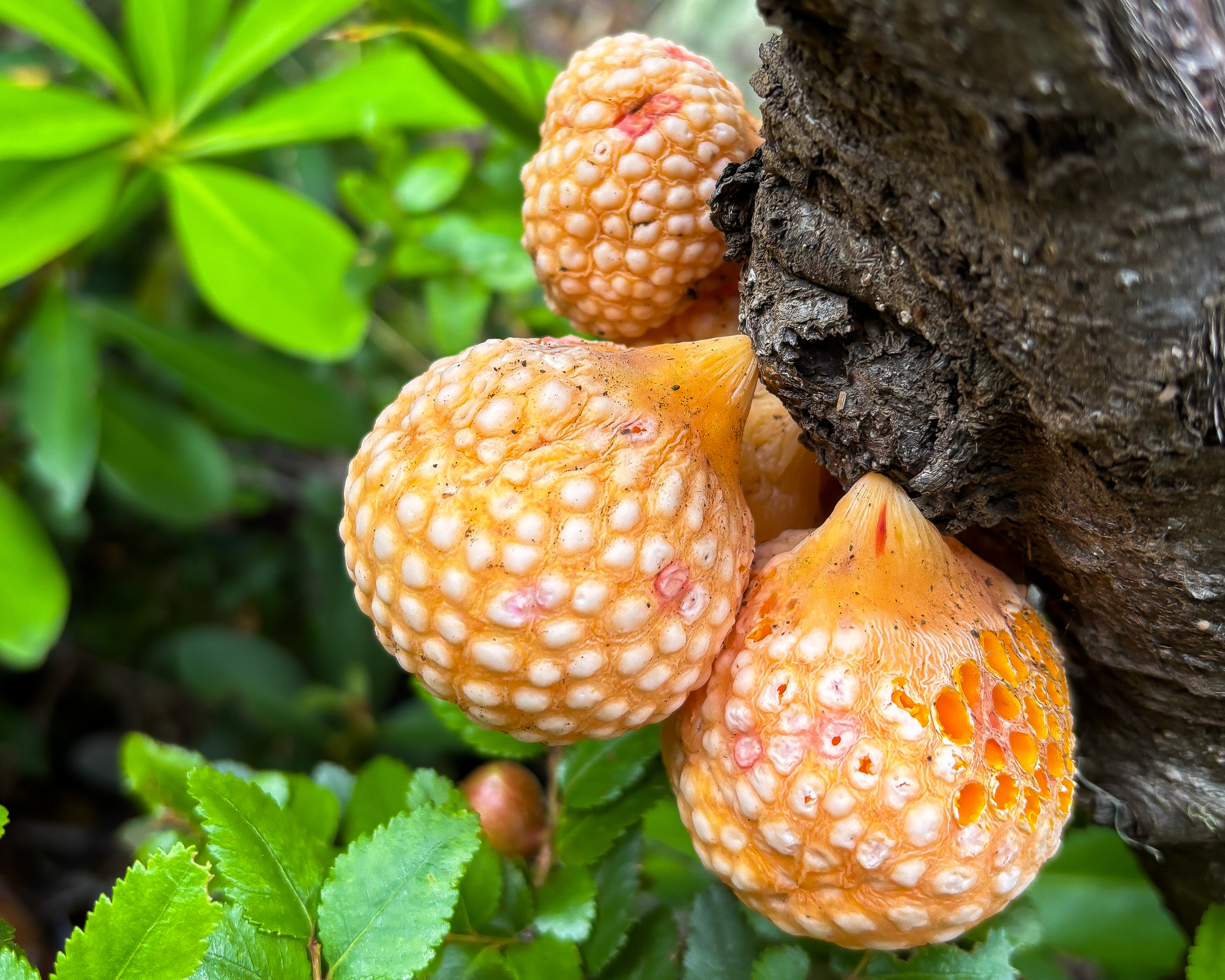
- Cyttaria espinosae

Scientific classification
- Kingdom: Fungi
- Division: Ascomycota
- Class: Leotiomycetes
- Order: Cyttariales; Luttr. ex Gamundí (1971)

Families
- Cyttariaceae; Deltopyxidaceae

= Cyttariales =

Order of fungi

Cyttariales are an order of ascomycete fungi. Many of them cause serious plant diseases. The order contains two families, three genera, and 15 species.
