= Schaereria brunnea =

Scientific classification
- Domain: Eukaryota
- Kingdom: Fungi
- Division: Ascomycota
- Class: Lecanoromycetes
- Order: Schaereriales
- Family: Schaereriaceae
- Genus: Schaereria
- Species: S. brunnea

Binomial name
- Schaereria brunnea Björk, T.Sprib. & T.B.Wheeler (2009)

Species of lichen

Schaereria brunnea is a species of lichen in the family Schaereriaceae, first found in inland rainforests of British Columbia. This rare lichen forms very thin crusts made up of small pale brown patches, each topped with distinctive chocolate-brown barrel-shaped fruiting bodies that distinguish it from other tree-dwelling species in its genus. It was originally known from only three collections made between 1992 and 2007, all found growing on branches of western hemlock trees in ancient, misty forests over five centuries old. It has since been documented in Alaska.

== Taxonomy ==
Schaereria brunnea was described in 2009 by Curtis Björk, Toby Spribille and Tim Wheeler; the holotype was collected near the mouth of the Roaring River on the north arm of Quesnel Lake, British Columbia. The specific epithet (brunnea = brown) refers to the conspicuous chocolate-coloured apothecia (fruiting bodies), a feature that immediately separates the species from the blue-green-tinted apothecia typical of other epiphytic members of the genus. Before the formal publication the lichen had been illustrated informally in the Vancouver Sun.

Within the genus Schaereria the taxon is readily distinguished by its combination of brown pigments, large spores and unique suite of fatty acid metabolites. None of the three previously known tree-dwelling species (S. corticola, S. dolodes, S. parasemella) produces fatty acids, and all possess markedly smaller spores. Southern-Hemisphere rock dwellers such as S. bullata and S. porpidioides share the brown pigmentation but differ in their consistently spherical spores and different chemistries. As a result, S. brunnea represents a chemically and morphologically isolated lineage that is presently placed in Schaereria but, like the genus itself, remains unassigned to a definite family within the Ostropomycetidae.

== Description ==
The lichen forms a very thin crust composed of discrete, smooth areoles only 0.20–0.48 mm across and up to about 0.15 mm thick. These pale brown to cream patches merge into colonies a few millimetres wide and carry the microscopic green algae that provide photosynthetic energy. Each areole contains a single layer of round algal cells (7–11 μm in diameter) embedded in a web of short-celled fungal threads that sparkle with minute crystals when viewed under polarised light. Reproduction is by tiny, barrel-shaped apothecia that sit singly on the crust. The structures measure roughly 0.14–0.30 mm across and a little less high, with a massive chocolate-brown rim surrounding a narrow, flat to slightly cupped disc of darker brown tissue. A sheath of crystal-rich fungal tissue (the proper exciple) cups the spore-bearing layer and remains visible even on old specimens.

Microscopy shows a 160–175 μm-tall hymenium in which eight broadly ellipsoid ascospores mature in each long-cylindrical ascus; the spores are unusually large for the genus, typically 20 × 16 μm, and lack any outer gelatinous coat. The ascus walls stain deep blue with iodine, while the thallus itself is chemically unresponsive to the usual spot tests but flashes brilliant white under long-wave ultraviolet light. High-performance liquid chromatography detects lichesterinic and protolichesterinic acids together with an unidentified fatty acid—an unprecedented chemistry for Northern Hemisphere members of Schaereria.

== Habitat and distribution ==
The species is rare, originally known from only three gatherings made in 1992, 1995 and 2007. All collections came from the fine, upper branches of western hemlock (Tsuga heterophylla) in ancient inland boreal rain forests of British Columbia. At the type site the lichen occupied twigs roughly two metres above the ground in a gorge where water-logged soils and constant mist maintain very high humidity throughout the year. Associated lichen flora includes Alectoria sarmentosa, Lobaria pulmonaria and other moisture-loving species indicative of long-undisturbed conditions.

Fieldwork north-west of McBride and north of Kispiox recovered two additional colonies on dead hemlock twigs in "antique" cedar–hemlock stands estimated to exceed five centuries in age. No thallus has ever been observed outside this humid inland-rain-forest belt, and every find comprised only one or a few individual crusts, underscoring both the lichen's scarcity and its apparent reliance on continuous, old-growth canopy cover. The authors therefore regarded Schaereria brunnea as one of the rarest tree-dwelling lichens in western North America and a potential indicator of the continent's vanishing interior rain-forest ecosystem. The species was later identified in southeastern Alaska, also growing on Tsuga heterophylla. Its known range was extended more when it was reported from Denali Borough, where it was found growing on a different substrate (spruce twigs) and a different forest type (wetlands).
