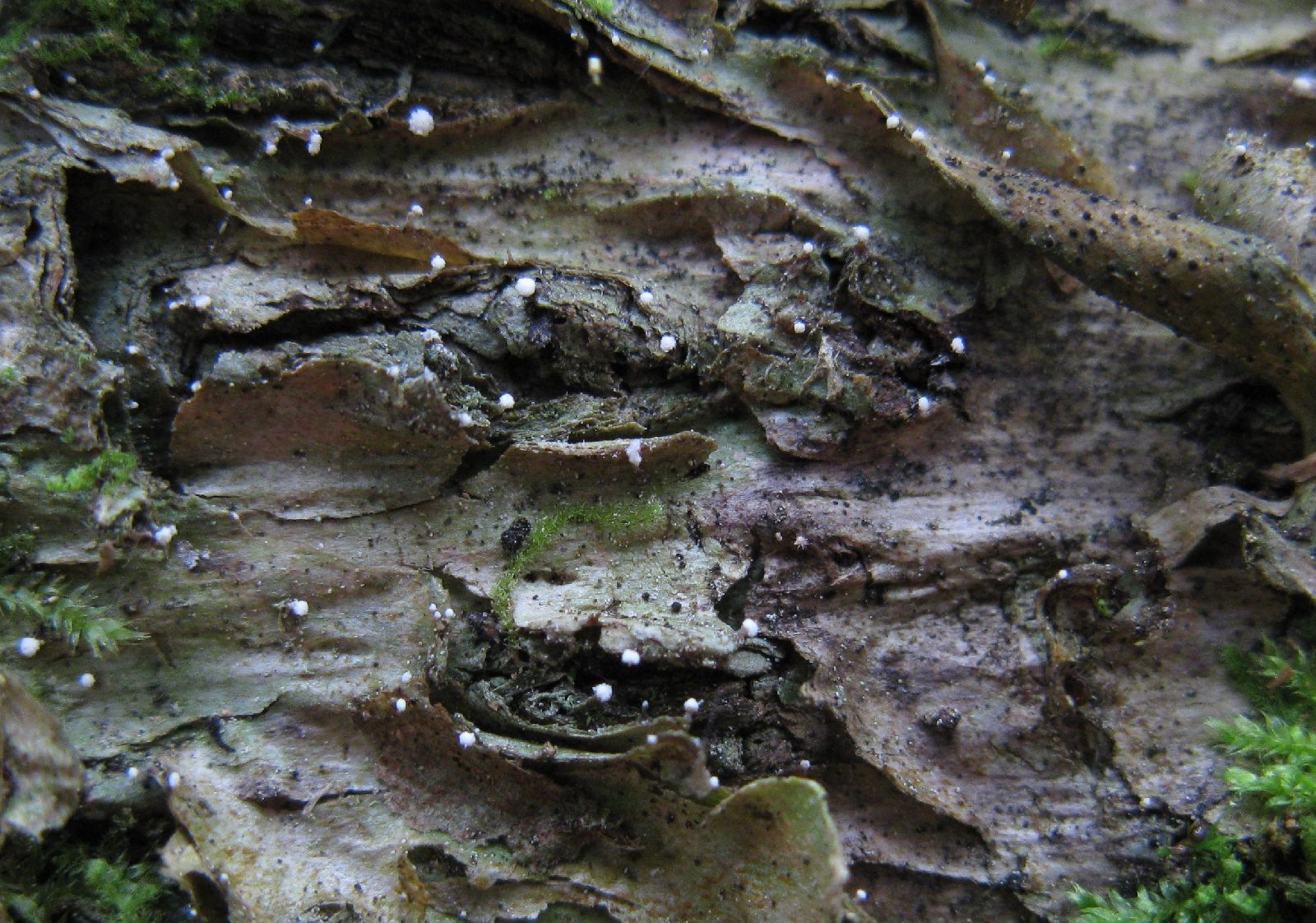

Scientific classification
- Kingdom: Fungi
- Division: Ascomycota
- Class: Lecanoromycetes
- Subclass: Ostropomycetidae
- Genus: Dictyocatenulata; Finley & E.F.Morris (1967)
- Species: D. alba

Binomial name
- Dictyocatenulata alba Finley & E.F.Morris (1967)

= Dictyocatenulata =

Single-species lichen genus

Dictyocatenulata is a fungal genus of uncertain classification in the subclass Ostropomycetidae. It contains the single species Dictyocatenulata alba. Originally described in 1967 as a bark-dwelling fungus, it was later recognised as a lichen in 2004. The genus is characterised by its unique reproductive structures called synnemata, which are upright, stem-like formations that produce spores. D. alba has a widespread distribution, found in North and Central America, Asia, and Europe, typically growing on tree bark in humid forests. Recent molecular studies suggest that Dictyocatenulata may be closely related to the genus Thelenella, potentially representing an asexual stage of unknown Thelenella species. This lichen is distinguished by its thin, greenish thallus (body) and its spores, which are divided into many cells and arranged in chains, features that give the genus its name.

== Taxonomy ==
The genus Dictyocatenulata was circumscribed by David Finley and Everett Morris in 1967, with D. alba as the type and only species. The genus name is derived from the Greek words dictyo- (net-like) and catenulata (chained), referring to the muriform conidia arranged in chains. Initially, the genus was classified within the group Dictyosporae, section Hyalostilbelleae, family Stilbellaceae, order Moniliales of the fungi imperfecti.

The type specimen of D. alba was collected on the bark of Fagus grandifolia (American beech) in Chocorua, New Hampshire, by William G. Farlow in September 1904. Specimens of this fungus had previously been identified as Stilbum glomerulisporum, a name that was later considered a nomen nudum (invalidly published) by Stanley Hughes in 1953.

Initially, D. alba was described as a fungus that grows on tree bark and produces specialised spore-bearing structures called synnemata (singular: synnema), which are upright, stem-like formations composed of fungal threads (hyphae) that bear spores at their tips. In 2004, Lendemer and Harris discovered that this species actually forms a symbiotic relationship with algae, making it a lichen.

In 2003, André Aptroot and Ulf Schiefelbein described what they believed was a new species, Cheiromycina ananas, based on its different spore-producing structures—called sporodochia (cushion-like masses of fungal tissue that produce spores)—and larger conidia (asexual spores). However, further research published by Paul Diederich, Zdeněk Palice, and Damien Ertz in 2008 revealed that C. ananas is actually the same species as D. alba. They found that the type specimen of C. ananas was an unusual form of D. alba with shorter spore-bearing structures and larger-than-typical conidia.

Dictyocatenulata alba differs from species in the related genus Cheiromycina in several key aspects:

- Spore-bearing structures: D. alba produces distinct synnemata of variable height (typically 200–500 μm, but can reach up to 1500 μm, or about 1.5 mm), while Cheiromycina species have flat, cushion-like sporodochia.
- Spores: D. alba has spores divided into many cells by walls running in multiple directions (called muriform), whereas Cheiromycina species (excluding C. ananas) have spores that branch out like fingers or a palm leaf.
- Spore production: D. alba creates its spores in a unique way, different from that observed in Cheiromycina.

Recent molecular studies have shed new light on the phylogenetic position of Dictyocatenulata. While An and colleagues initially placed D. alba within Ostropomycetidae based on internal transcribed spacer (ITS) sequences in 2012, more recent research using both ITS and mitochondrial SSU (mtSSU) sequences suggests a close relationship with the genus Thelenella in the family Thelenellaceae. MtSSU sequences from D. alba specimens revealed two distinct genotypes, one showing 95% identity with Thelenella muscorum subsp. muscorum, and another showing 98% identity with T. vezdae. These findings have led to the hypothesis that Dictyocatenulata may represent anamorphic stages of currently unknown or unsequenced Thelenella species. This new understanding places Dictyocatenulata within a more specific taxonomic context within the Ostropomycetidae.

== Description ==
The thallus of Dictyocatenulata alba is spread out in a thin, smooth layer that is greyish-green when dry and dark green when wet. It forms a continuous, matt surface and lacks a distinct outer skin (cortex), making it very thin and irregular in development. The photosynthetic partner (photobiont) within the lichen is from the Trentepohlia genus of green algae. These algal cells are small, measuring 7–12 μm, and are often embedded within the substrate the lichen is growing on.

The reproductive structures of Dictyocatenulata are specialised formations called synnemata, which are tall, upright spore-producing structures. These structures often emerge either from a smooth white disc of superficial mycelium or directly from the bark, depending on environmental conditions. These can range in height from almost invisible (0 μm) to as tall as 1.5 mm (1500 μm). In the original description, the synnemata were characterised as white, reaching up to 1,200 μm in height, with a width of up to 150 μm at the base, narrowing to about 50 μm just below the heads. The synnemata are typically unbranched, but occasionally they may branch in the middle, dividing into two to five parts. The stalk (stipe) of the synnemata is smooth and cream-coloured, with a diameter of 25 to 175 μm. At the top of the stalk is the fertile zone, which produces conidia (asexual spores). This fertile area is convex, white, and typically the same width as the stalk, although in some cases it can be up to 300 μm wide. When the fertile zone begins to erode, it becomes concave and takes on the same cream colour as the stalk.

The stalk is made up of tightly packed, parallel hyphae (fungal threads), which are translucent (hyaline) and very narrow, with individual cells measuring 5–17 μm long and 1–2 μm wide. Conidia are produced by specialised cells called conidiogenous cells, which either grow directly from the synnemata or from existing conidia, forming chains of spores. The conidia are small, almost spherical to ellipsoid, and muriform—divided into many cells (mostly 10–25, but up to 40). They are colourless (hyaline), smooth, and measure 7–14 μm in length (sometimes up to 18 μm) and 7–11 μm in width. Individual cells within the spores are nearly spherical to slightly oval-shaped, mostly 2.5–3.5 μm in diameter. The original description noted the conidia as being slightly smaller, measuring 5–10 by 5–12 μm. Individual cells within the spores are nearly spherical to shortly oval-shaped, smooth, and mostly 2.5–3.5 μm in diameter.

The conidial mass is described as white and dry, tightly packed when young, but becoming powdery (pulverulent) as it matures. The conidia are held tightly together in long chains and mature from the tip to the base (basipetally).

When cultured on 2% malt agar, D. alba forms restricted, slow-growing, compact, velvety to cottony colonies that are sterile and orange-grey in colour with a brown reverse. On oatmeal agar, the colonies show concentric zones of shades of brown, lightest near the inoculum and darkest at the margin.

== Habitat and distribution ==
Dictyocatenulata alba has a widespread distribution across several continents. It has been reported from North America (Canada and the United States), Central America (Cuba and Panama), Asia (India and Japan), and Europe. The species was first reported in Europe in 2008, where it appears to be widespread and locally common in Central and Eastern Europe, but seemingly rare or possibly absent in Western Europe.

In Europe, D. alba is typically found in humid broad-leaved and mixed forests, often in valleys near streams. It grows primarily on the smooth bark of various trees, with a preference for certain species: Acer pseudoplatanus (Sycamore maple), Betula (birch species), Fagus sylvatica (European beech), and Quercus (oak species). The lichen is frequently observed at the shaded base of tree stems, suggesting a preference for more humid and sheltered microhabitats. While primarily bark-dwelling (corticolous), D. alba has also been collected twice on rocks, indicating some flexibility in its substrate preferences.

Dictyocatenulata alba often forms extensive patches and is not typically intermingled with other lichen species. However, it has been noted to occur in close proximity to Coenogonium pineti, another crustose lichen species.

The species has been found at various elevations, with collections ranging from around 700 metres to over 1000 metres above sea level in mountainous regions of Central and Eastern Europe. In North America, the species has been reported from diverse locations, including the Catskill Mountains in New York State. In Asia, it has been found in the Primorsky Krai region of Russia, growing at the base of oak trees in a forest with an open understory.
