= Thelenella lateralis =

Scientific classification
- Kingdom: Fungi
- Division: Ascomycota
- Class: Lecanoromycetes
- Order: Thelenellales
- Family: Thelenellaceae
- Genus: Thelenella
- Species: T. lateralis

Binomial name
- Thelenella lateralis Aptroot & M.Cáceres (2014)
- Holotype: Parque da Cidade Governador José Rollemberg Leite, Sergipe, Brazil

Species of lichen

Thelenella lateralis is a species of corticolous (bark-dwelling), crustose lichen in the family Thelenellaceae. This species is notable for its eccentric ostiole (off-centre opening) and irregularly muriform ascospores (spores with multiple chambers), which are 7–9 by 0–2-septate and measure 27–32 μm by 9–10.5 μm.

The type specimen of Thelenella lateralis was collected from Parque da Cidade Governador José Rollemberg Leite in Aracaju, Sergipe, Brazil, at an elevation of about 75 m. The thallus is thin, metallic grey, and lacks pseudocyphellae (tiny pores on the surface) and a prothallus (a border around the thallus). The ascomata (fruiting bodies) are immersed in the bark and pyriform (pear-shaped), measuring 0.4–0.55 mm in diameter. The walls of the ascomata are only carbonised (blackened) above. The ostioles are eccentric and dark grey. The hamathecium, the tissue between the asci (spore-producing structures), does not contain oil droplets, and its filaments interconnect. The asci have an ocular chamber, and the ascospores are long, ellipsoid to fusiform (spindle-shaped), hyaline (translucent), and irregularly arranged in two rows. The ascospores have rounded or pointed ends. Thelenella lateralis does not make pycnidia (small asexual fruiting bodies). Chemically, no substances were detected.

Thelenella lateralis grows on smooth bark in remnants of Atlantic rainforest and is currently only known from Brazil. This is the first species in the genus Thelenella described with eccentric ostioles. It is closely related to Thelenella paraguayensis, which has larger ascospores measuring 42–60 μm by 13–19 μm.
