= Thelenella monospora =

Scientific classification
- Kingdom: Fungi
- Division: Ascomycota
- Class: Lecanoromycetes
- Order: Thelenellales
- Family: Thelenellaceae
- Genus: Thelenella
- Species: T. monospora

Binomial name
- Thelenella monospora Aptroot & M.Cáceres (2016)
- Holotype: Amapá National Forest, Brazil

Species of lichen

Thelenella monospora is a species of saxicolous (rock-dwelling) crustose lichen in the family Thelenellaceae. This lichen was discovered in 2016 growing on silica-rich rocks in the primary rainforest of Brazil's Amapá National Forest. It is unusual because its spore-containing structures hold only one large spore each, rather than the typical eight spores found in most related species.

== Taxonomy ==
Thelenella monospora was described as new to science in 2016 by André Aptroot and Marcela da Silva Cáceres, from material collected in the Amapá National Forest (eastern Brazilian Amazon). The holotype was gathered on siliceous rock in primary tall forest near the field station at about 30 m elevation; the specific epithet refers to its asci that contain a single ascospore.

== Description ==
The thallus is corticate (with a cortex), smooth, shiny, continuous, thin, and bluish gray, bordered by a shiny white prothallus that is about 0.3 mm wide. The ascomata are perithecioid, low and conical (about 0.5–0.7 mm in diameter), and are almost entirely covered by the thallus; only a brown ostiole (about 0.1 mm) is exposed and typically surrounded by a narrow whitish ring. The ascomatal wall is mostly hyaline, with a broad darkened zone around the ostiole. Asci contain one spore; the spores are hyaline, ellipsoid, irregularly muriform, and large (75–90 × 25–28 μm), each surrounded by a roughly 5 μm gelatinous sheath. Pycnidia were not observed. T. monospora is unreactive with standard spot tests; thin-layer chromatography detected no lichen substances.

== Habitat and distribution ==
Thelenella monospora grows on siliceous rock in primary tall forest within the eastern Amazon. It is known to occur only in Amapá state, growing at around 30 m elevation.
