= Thelenella indica =

Scientific classification
- Domain: Eukaryota
- Kingdom: Fungi
- Division: Ascomycota
- Class: Lecanoromycetes
- Order: Thelenellales
- Family: Thelenellaceae
- Genus: Thelenella
- Species: T. indica

Binomial name
- Thelenella indica Pinokiyo, Kr.P.Singh (2006)

Species of lichen

Thelenella indica is a species of foliicolous (leaf-dwelling) lichen in the family Thelenellaceae. Found in India, it was formally described as a new species in 2006 by Athokpam Pinokiyo and Krishna Pal Singh. The type specimen was collected by the first author in a tropical forest along the Assam-Linzey road in the East Sikkim district; here it was found growing on the leaves of a small Schima wallichii tree. It appears to be endemic to the Sikkim region of India.

The lichen has a greyish-brown, verrucose (warted) thallus lacking a cortex. The photobiont partner of Thelenella indica is a species of green alga from family Chlorococcaceae with rounded cells measuring 6–12 μm in diameter, and occurring in groups of 5–18 cells.
