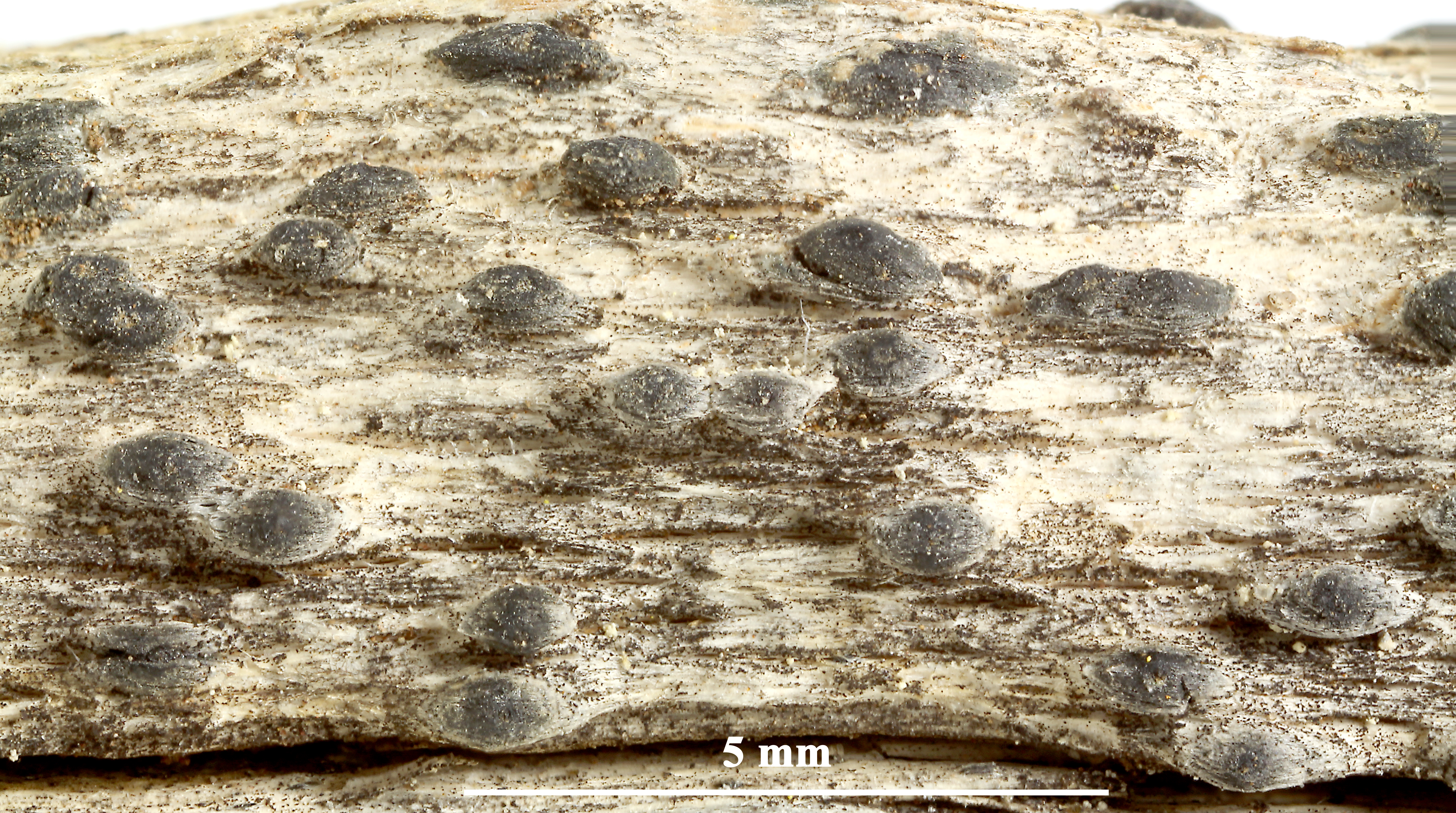
- Julella vitrispora

Scientific classification
- Kingdom: Fungi
- Division: Ascomycota
- Class: Lecanoromycetes
- Order: Thelenellales
- Family: Thelenellaceae
- Genus: Julella; Fabre (1879)

Type species
- Julella buxi Fabre (1879)

Synonyms
- Catharinia (Sacc.) Sacc. (1895); Hyalospora Nieuwl. (1916); Peltosphaeria Berl. (1888); Pleospora subgen. Catharinia Sacc. (1883); Polyblastiopsis Zahlbr. (1903)

= Julella =

Genus of fungi

Julella is a genus of ascomycete fungi. Most species are non-lichenised, bark-dwelling saprophytes, though some collections appear to be facultatively lichenised with the green alga Trentepohlia. The fungi produce immersed, black, flask-shaped perithecia with a dark involucrellum. Their asci are double-walled and contain two or eight large, colourless, muriform (multi-chambered) ascospores. Asexual fruiting bodies (pycnidia) produce simple, rod-shaped conidia. No secondary metabolites are known. The genus was introduced by Jean-Henri Fabre in 1879. Modern treatments recognise only a few species, and its family placement is unsettled, with recent sources placing it in Thelenellaceae, Trypetheliaceae, or Didymosphaeriaceae.

== Taxonomy ==
The genus Julella was introduced by the French naturalist Jean-Henri Fabre in 1879, working within the then broadly defined Sphaeriaceae. Fabre separated his material by an unusual character: the spore sacs (asci) contain only two spores, rather than the eight (or at least four) common in related fungi. He also emphasised the very large, lattice-like, many-celled (muriform) spores and the immersed, black, flask-shaped fruiting bodies (perithecia) formed in the bark. Fabre dedicated the name to his son Jules, his collaborator in microscopical work, who had died young. The type species, Julella buxi, was described from boxwood (Buxus sempervirens) on bark and dead wood in southern France (Avignon, Orange, Sérignan).

In a 1985 re-examination of Fabre's original material, Margaret E. Barr treated Peltosphaeria and Polyblastiopsis as congeneric with Julella and made the new combinations Julella vitrispora and J. lactea (including var. naegelii). She also noted long-standing uncertainty about the publication date of Fabre's first "Essai" (the volume shows "1878", but internal and bibliographic evidence points to late 1879 or 1880). Barr placed Julella in the family Arthopyreniaceae and regarded Catharinia as a synonym of Julella, while cautioning that its status hinges on rediscovery of type material. She further observed that several names then assigned to Julella differ in key characters and likely do not belong in the genus.

Re-examining the group, André Aptroot and Pieter van den Boom treated Julella as a small genus of mostly corticolous, non-lichenised bark saprophytes that has attracted little attention; although roughly a hundred names had been published across Julella and allied genera such as Catharinia, Peltosphaeria and Polyblastiopsis, they considered only a few species to be well founded and widely distributed. They noted that in fungi with large, muriform spores, measurements vary widely, so species should be delimited using at least two correlated characters rather than spore size alone. Those authors provided a simple key to the corticolous species: J. lactea has 2 (rarely as many as 6) spores per ascus and larger ascocarps (typically > 0.5 mm), whereas 8-spored species separate by spore size and ascocarp size—J. vitrispora with spores usually > 21 μm and ascocarps > 0.5 mm, and J. sericea with shorter spores (generally < 21 μm) and ascocarps up to 0.5 mm. They stressed that J. lactea and J. vitrispora differ mainly by the number of spores per ascus and suggested that the taxonomic weight of this difference needs further testing.

Applying this framework, Aptroot and van den Boom reduced several names to synonymy. They placed Fabre's J. buxi in J. lactea and regarded a suite of names originally described in Polyblastiopsis (e.g., P. dispora, P. alba and P. rappii) as conspecific with J. lactea or probably so, based on identified material. For J. vitrispora, they considered J. sublactea and Polyblastiopsis subargentea to be synonyms or probable synonyms. They also excluded a number of names from Julella altogether, assigning them to lichen-forming trypethelialean genera such as Polymeridium, Anthracothecium, Anisomeridium and Laurera.

Julella is tentatively included in the family Thelenellaceae by some sources, while other sources include it in the Trypetheliaceae or as a genus of "unconfirmed affinities". In their 2021 treatment of the Thelenellaceae in the Revisions of British and Irish Lichens series, Paul Cannon and Alan Orange suggest that there is "no convincing morphological distinction between" the genera Chromatochlamys and Thelenella, and they consider Thelenella in a broad sense to include Chromatochlamys. In the "2024 Outline of Fungi and fungus-like taxa", it is classified in the family Didymosphaeriaceae.

== Description ==
Julella species are mostly non-lichenised and saprophytic (living on dead plant material), though some may be facultatively lichenised with green alga of the genus Trentepohlia; no secondary algal partner is involved. A macroscopic thallus (the visible lichen body) is typically absent on the surface; the fungus develops within the bark or wood.

The sexual fruiting bodies are perithecia (small, flask-shaped structures) circular to ellipsoid in outline. They carry a dark involucrellum, a protective outer sheath that usually spreads laterally and is formed from compacted fungal tissue intermingled with host bark cells. In section, the perithecial wall is greenish to brown and appears black externally; it gives a greenish reaction with potassium hydroxide solution (K+) and is negative to the N test (nitric acid; N−). The wall is not continuous beneath the locule. The hamathecium consists of richly branched pseudoparaphyses (sterile threads that anastomose above the asci) and these elements are non-amyloid (they do not turn blue in iodine-based reagents). The asci (spore sacs) are bitunicate (double-walled), club-shaped, with an apical tholus; they are non-amyloid and have the inner wall thickened towards the apex, often with a shallow, broad ocular chamber (a clear zone at the tip).

Ascospores are hyaline (colourless), ellipsoid to club-shaped, and muriform, meaning they are divided by multiple vertical and horizontal septa into many small cells. They are generally 13–65 μm long and 7–22 μm wide, with smooth, unornamented walls. Asexual reproduction occurs in black, pycnidial conidiomata that produce simple, colourless, rod-like (bacilliform) conidia. No secondary metabolites have been detected in the genus.

== Species ==
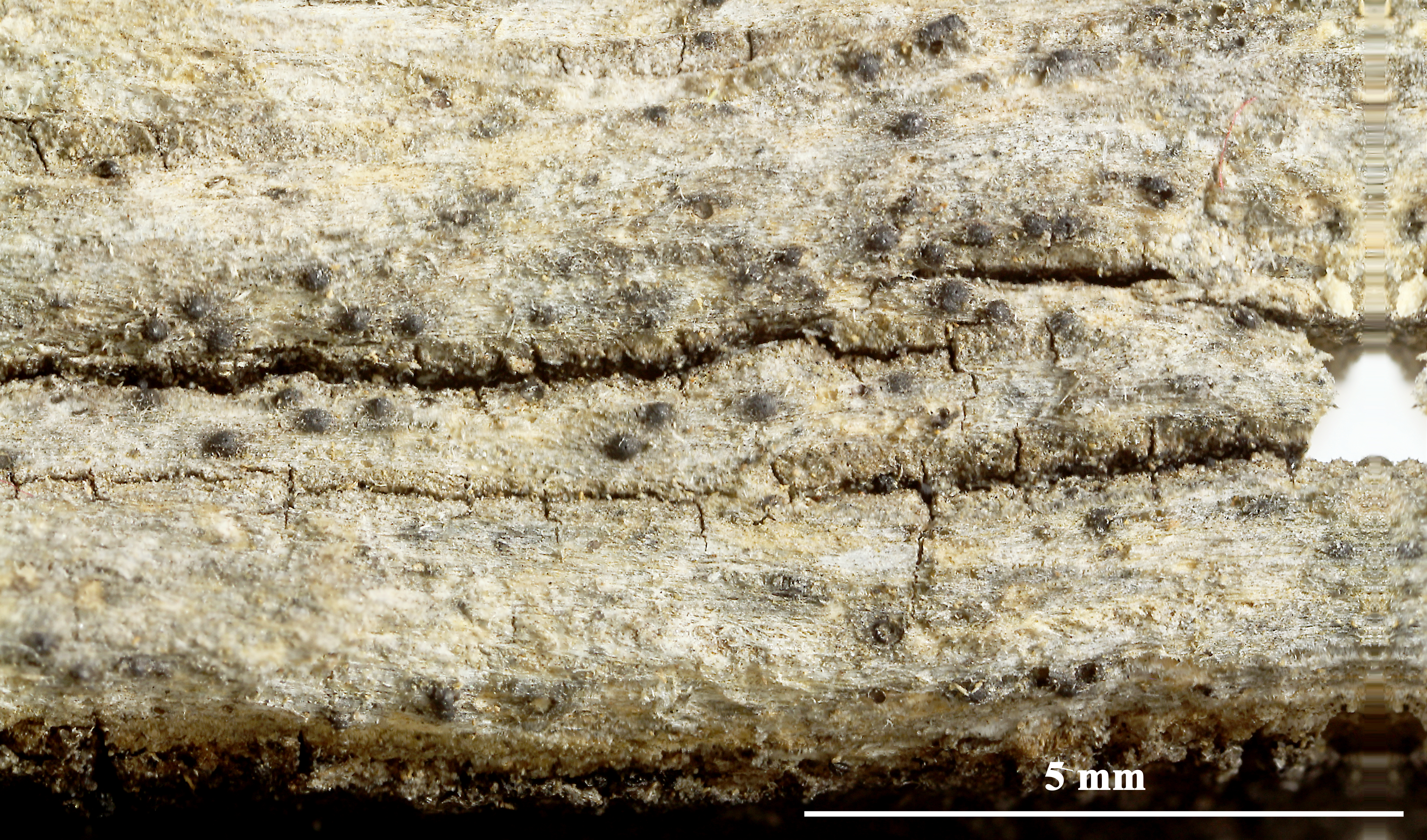
Julella sericea

- Julella argentina Speg. (1898)
- Julella asema R.C.Harris (1995)
- Julella buxi Fabre (1879)
- Julella dactylospora Rehm (1901)
- Julella fabiana Marinc., M.J.Wingf. & Crous (2008)
- Julella herbatilis Kohlm., Volkm.-Kohlm. & O.E.Erikss. (1997)
- Julella lactea (A.Massal.) M.E.Barr (1986)
- Julella leopoldina Rehm (1908)
- Julella muelleri (Upreti & Ajay Singh) D.D.Awasthi (2000)
- Julella multiloculata A.Pande & V.G.Rao (1989)
- Julella plagiostoma Syd. & P.Syd. (1917)
- Julella sarcostemmatis K.Ramakr. (1953)
- Julella sericea (A.Massal.) Coppins (1992)
- Julella sublactea (Nyl.) R.C.Harris (1987)
- Julella taxodii R.C.Harris (1995)
- Julella variiformis R.C.Harris (1995)
- Julella vitrispora (Cooke & Harkn.) M.E.Barr (1986)
- Julella zenkeriana Henn. (1905)
