= Schaereria serenior =

Scientific classification
- Kingdom: Fungi
- Division: Ascomycota
- Class: Lecanoromycetes
- Order: Schaereriales
- Family: Schaereriaceae
- Genus: Schaereria
- Species: S. serenior

Binomial name
- Schaereria serenior (Vain.) Vitik. (2004)

Synonyms
- Lecidea tenebrosa var. serenior Vain. (1890); Lecidea serenior (Vain.) Hue (1913); Caloplaca serenior (Vain.) Zahlbr. (1931); Schaereria serenior (Vain.) Vitik., Ahti, Kuusinen, Lommi & T.Ulvinen (1997)

Species of lichen

Schaereria serenior is a little-known species of saxicolous (bark-dwelling), crustose lichen in the family Schaereriaceae. It is found in Finland. It has been listed as data deficient in the Finnish Regional Red List since 2000. It also occurs in Lycksele, Sweden.

== Taxonomy ==
The lichen was first formally described as a new species by the Finnish lichenologist Edvard August Vainio, who classified it as a variety of the species Lecidea tenebrosa. In his original description published in 1883, Vainio named it Lecidea tenebrosa var. serenior and noted its distinctive features, including a thallus that turns slightly violet with iodine, initially innate apothecia (fruiting bodies) that become elevated, brownish-black colouration, and a "beautifully" blue-violet epithecium. He documented its habitat on granitic rock in Lake Inari in the pine forest region of Lapland. Vainio also provided several measurements to document microscopic characteristics of the lichen.

Auguste-Marie Hue promoted the taxon to distinct species status in 1913 as Lecidea serenior. Alexander Zahlbruckner proposed to transfer it to the genus Caloplaca in 1931. Most recently, Orvo Vitikainen transferred it to Schaereria in 2004, a few years after that genus had been resurrected from a long period of disuse. It is one of two species of Schaereria found in Finland; the other is S. parasemella.

== Description ==
Schaereria serenior is a crustose lichen with several typical physical characteristics. The thallus (the main body of the lichen) is moderately thick to relatively thick, with a warty or warty-areolate surface texture. These warts are typically 0.4–0.5 mm wide (though they can range from 0.2–0.7 mm), and appear either well-defined or somewhat flattened and convex. The warts have a smooth surface, appearing ash-colored, and are scattered over a black hypothallus (the underlying layer). These warts tend to be either dispersed or somewhat contiguous, and notably lack soredia (powdery reproductive structures).

The apothecia (reproductive structures) are initially embedded within the thallus warts for some time, eventually emerging with lecideine characteristics. They measure 0.5–1 mm in width, with a flat, black, naked, opaque disc. The apothecia have a permanent, black, naked, thin margin that often protrudes slightly and remains intact.

Internally, the lichen has a colourless to pale hypothecium (the tissue beneath the spore-producing layer) with erect hyphae. The epithecium (the upper layer of the spore-producing structure) is violet-brown to sooty coloured. The paraphyses (sterile filaments between spore-producing cells) are loosely connected. The asci (spore-producing cells) are cylindrical to cylindrical-club shaped. Each ascus produces eight ascospores arranged in two rows. The spores are ellipsoid to somewhat spherical, measuring 7–12 μm in length and 5–8 μm in thickness.
