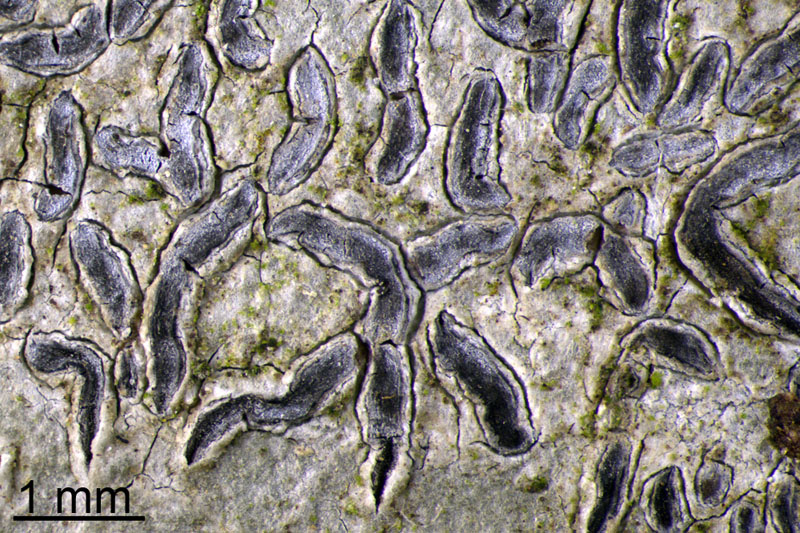
- The script lichen species Graphis scripta

Scientific classification
- Kingdom: Fungi
- Division: Ascomycota
- Class: Lecanoromycetes
- Subclass: Ostropomycetidae; Reeb, Lutzoni, & Cl.Roux (2004)

Orders
- Baeomycetales; Graphidales; Gyalectales; Odontotrematales; Ostropales; Pertusariales; Sarrameanales; Schaereriales; Thelenellales

= Ostropomycetidae =

Subclass of fungi

The Ostropomycetidae are a subclass of mostly lichen-forming fungi in the class Lecanoromycetes. It contains nine orders and 37 families.

Arctomiaceae is the only family in the Ostropomycetidae that associates with cyanobacteria of the order Nostocales as its main photobiont partner.

== Taxonomy ==
The subclass was circumscribed in 2004 by Catherine Reeb, François M. Lutzoni, and Claude Roux. This classification was based on molecular phylogenetics studies combining nuclear ribosomal RNA genes (SSU and LSU) with the protein-coding gene RPB2. In their study, adding RPB2 to the ribosomal markers was intended to improve resolution and support for deeper relationships among major ascomycete lineages, including lichen-forming groups, and it was in this context that Ostropomycetidae was introduced as a new subclass.

The taxonomic framework is anchored by the type order Ostropales, which includes the type family Stictidaceae (synonymous with Ostropaceae) and its type genus Stictis. In the protologue, Ostropomycetidae was characterised broadly enough to include both lichen-forming and non-lichen-forming fungi; when lichenised, members typically have crustose, squamulose, or filamentous thalli, with a green-algal photobiont (either chlorococcoid or Trentepohlia). The fruiting bodies are described as apothecia or, in some lineages, perithecia, and the asci bear eight or fewer colourless spores that may be simple, transversely septate, or muriform (divided into many small compartments). Phylogenetic analyses in the same study resolved two major evolutionary lineages within the subclass: the Pertusariales-Icmadophilaceae clade and a group consisting of the Ostropales, Baeomycetales, and Hymeneliaceae.

== Description ==
The Ostropomycetidae are a subclass of fungi that can exist either as non-lichenised forms or as lichens with a variety of body types, including crust-like, scaly (squamulose), or filamentous thalli. When lichens are present, their photosynthetic partners (photobionts) are usually green algae of a simple, rounded shape (chlorococcoid) or algae of the genus Trentepohlia, known for their orangeish hue.

The reproductive structures (ascomata) of these fungi can be found embedded in the lichen's surface (immersed), sitting on top of it (sessile), or raised on a stalk (pedunculate). They take the form of open, disc-like fruiting bodies called apothecia—these can present in different styles, such as cryptolecanorine and lecanorine forms, and sometimes appear as lecideine when partially immersed. In some members, the reproductive structures may instead resemble flask-shaped perithecia.

Inside the ascomata are special sac-like cells (asci), each typically holding eight or fewer spores (ascospores). These spores are colourless and can be simple (without internal divisions), divided by transverse walls, or arranged into more complex, brick-like partitions (muriform). Thin, thread-like supporting filaments called paraphyses may be simple or may branch and reconnect (anastomose), providing structural support.

The asci can have one or two layers (unitunicate or bitunicate) but function as if they have a single layer. They may or may not contain a tholus (a structure in the ascus tip), and this tholus can sometimes react with iodine, making it appear bluish (amyloid). Additionally, some asci have an "ocular chamber"—a distinct region at the tip that helps release spores—while others do not.

== Chemistry ==
As with many lichen-forming fungi, members of Ostropomycetidae produce a wide range of secondary metabolites: small organic compounds that are not required for basic growth, but can help lichens cope with stresses and mediate interactions with other organisms. In lichenology these substances matter because their presence and distribution often track particular lineages, so chemical characters have long been used alongside morphology and DNA evidence in taxonomy and systematics. The lichen partnership also brings additional biosynthetic capacity: the photobiont (green alga or cyanobacterium) and associated microbes can contribute to, or influence, the overall chemical profile found in the thallus.

Across the subclass, reported metabolites span several familiar lichen-chemical families. A recent synthesis of the literature summarised 202 structurally characterised compounds from Ostropomycetidae lichens (drawn from 14 studied families), with roughly half belonging to phenolic derivatives such as simple phenols, depsides, tridepsides, and depsidones. Much of the remaining diversity falls under polyketide-derived groups (including lactones, phthalides, dibenzofurans, chromones, and xanthones), with additional records of fatty acids, terpenoids (including sesquiterpenes), sterols, and a small number of non-ribosomal peptides. Many of these compounds have been screened in laboratory assays for activities such as antibacterial, antifungal, antiviral, antioxidant, and anti-inflammatory effects. Because many lichens grow slowly, researchers often rely on cultured fungal partners (mycobionts) as an alternative way to obtain enough material for chemical study.

== Taxa of uncertain classification ==
The following taxa are of uncertain classification (incertae sedis) in the Ostropomycetidae:

Family incertae sedis:

- Epigloeaceae Zahlbr. (1903)

Genera incertae sedis:

- Amphorothecium P.M.McCarthy, Kantvilas & Elix (2001) – 1 sp.
- Anzina Scheid. (1982) – 1 sp.
- Aspilidea Hafellner (2001) – 1 sp.
- Bachmanniomyces D.Hawksw. (1981) – 8 spp.
- Dictyocatenulata Finley & E.F.Morris (1967) – 1 sp.
- Malvinia Döbbeler (2003) – 1 sp.
- Pleiopatella Rehm (1908) – 1 sp.
