= Schaereria albomarginata =

Scientific classification
- Domain: Eukaryota
- Kingdom: Fungi
- Division: Ascomycota
- Class: Lecanoromycetes
- Order: Schaereriales
- Family: Schaereriaceae
- Genus: Schaereria
- Species: S. albomarginata

Binomial name
- Schaereria albomarginata Øvstedal (2009)

Species of lichen

Schaereria albomarginata is a species of saxicolous (rock-dwelling) lichen in the family Schaereriaceae. Found in continental Antarctica, it was formally described as a new species in 2009 by Norwegian lichenologist Dag Øvstedal. The type specimen was collected from the Wakefield Highlands in Eternity Range at an altitude of 2,200 m (7,200 ft). Here the lichen was found growing in rock fissures. Its thallus appears as small tufts up to 10 mm (0.4 in) in diameter on thick, pale, rhizomorphs with overlapping areolae. The areolae are brown with a prominent white margin; this feature is referred to in the specific epithet albomarginata. Its ascospores are simple, colourless, and more or less spherical, measuring about 7 μm in diameter. No lichen products were detected in the specimen.
