= Schaereria fabispora =

Scientific classification
- Domain: Eukaryota
- Kingdom: Fungi
- Division: Ascomycota
- Class: Lecanoromycetes
- Order: Schaereriales
- Family: Schaereriaceae
- Genus: Schaereria
- Species: S. fabispora

Binomial name
- Schaereria fabispora Hertel & Zürn (1986)

Species of lichen

Schaereria fabispora is a species of crustose lichen in the family Schaereriaceae. Found in Norway, it was formally described as a new species in 1986 by lichenologists Hannes Hertel and L. Zürn.

Diagnostically, Schaereria fabispora differs from Schaereria tenebrosa due to its larger, kidney-shaped ascospores (16.5–22 by 5.5–7 μm). The type specimen was found in Vega Island, Norway, by Gunnar Degelius, where it was found growing on exposed granitic rock.

== Description ==
In appearance, Schaereria fabispora closely mirrors its relative, Schaereria tenebrosa. The thallus presents as a cohesive crust with a grey-white hue. It is characterised by a finely cracked surface and a height of up to 0.25 mm. Beneath a thin, colourless layer, a brown pigmented zone is observed, consisting of densely packed hyphal cells. The lichen also hosts Trebouxioid green algae within a defined photobiont layer.

Unique to this species are its apothecia, which are sunken in their younger stages and have a matte black appearance. Internally, the excipulum (outer layer of the apothecium) has unpigmented hyphae and spaces filled with fine crystals, occasionally interspersed with algae. The hymenium layer, which is where the lichen produces spores, is notable for its vibrant blue-green hue and blue-violet granules. The spores of Schaereria fabispora are bean-shaped, differing from the ellipsoid shape seen in Schaereria tenebrosa.

A distinguishing feature of Schaereria fabispora is its significantly larger spores, which are 16.5–18.7–22 by 5.5–6.0–7 μm, as compared to those of Schaereria tenebrosa that are 10.5–12.4–15 by 5.3–6.2–7.5 μm. The lichen tests negative with commonly used chemical spot tests used in lichenology. The lichen does contain Hypnorum-blue, a dark blue to black insoluble lichen pigment.
