= Chromatochlamys =

Scientific classification
- Domain: Eukaryota
- Kingdom: Fungi
- Division: Ascomycota
- Class: Lecanoromycetes
- Order: Thelenellales
- Family: Thelenellaceae
- Genus: Chromatochlamys; Trevis.

Genus of fungi

Chromatochlamys is a genus of fungi belonging to the family Thelenellaceae.

The genus was first described by Trevisan in 1860.

Species:

- Chromatochlamys muscorum
