= Schaereria xerophila =

Scientific classification
- Kingdom: Fungi
- Division: Ascomycota
- Class: Lecanoromycetes
- Order: Schaereriales
- Family: Schaereriaceae
- Genus: Schaereria
- Species: S. xerophila

Binomial name
- Schaereria xerophila Rambold & H.Mayrhofer (1989)

Species of lichen

Schaereria xerophila is a species of saxicolous (rock-dwelling), crustose lichen in the family Schaereriaceae. Found in Australia, it was formally described as a new species in 1989 by the lichenologists Gerhard Rambold and Helmut Mayrhofer. The type specimen was found growing on lowland, inland siliceous rock in Queensland, but its range has been expanded to include Tasmania. It is one of five species of Schaereria to occur in Australia. Some diagnostic characteristics of Schaereria xerophila include its crustose, areolate thallus, semi-immersed apothecia, and roughly spherical, non-halonate spores.
