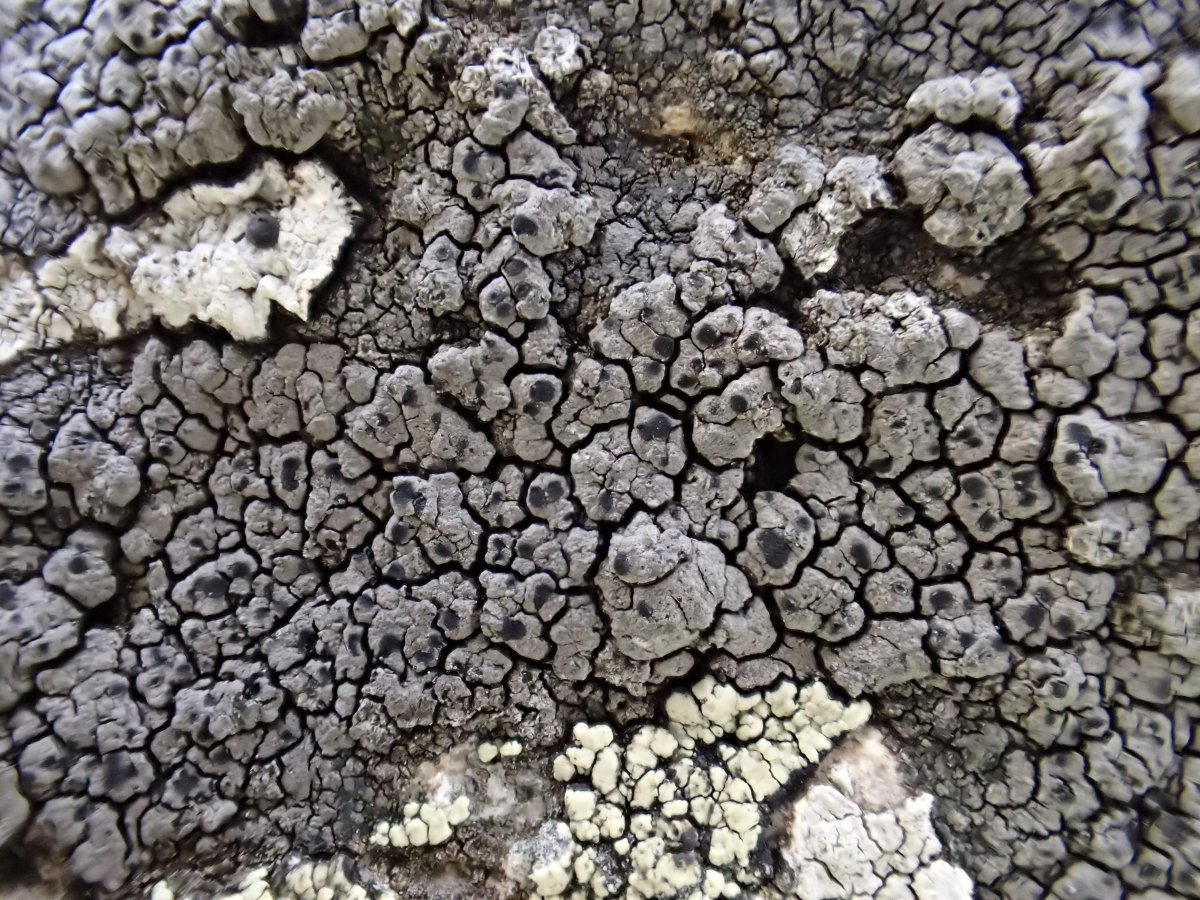
- Schaereria fuscocinerea

Scientific classification
- Domain: Eukaryota
- Kingdom: Fungi
- Division: Ascomycota
- Class: Lecanoromycetes
- Subclass: Ostropomycetidae
- Order: Schaereriales; Lumbsch & Leavitt (2018)
- Family: Schaereriaceae; M.Choisy ex Hafellner (1984)
- Genus: Schaereria; Körb. (1855)

Type species
- Schaereria lugubris (A.Massal.) Körb. (1855)

Synonyms
- Hafellnera Houmeau & Cl.Roux (1984); Ropalospora A.Massal. (1860)

= Schaereria =

Genus of lichen

Schaereria is a genus of lichen-forming fungi. It is the sole genus in the family Schaereriaceae, which itself is the only family in the Schaereriales, an order in the subclass Ostropomycetidae of the class Lecanoromycetes. Most Schaereria species are crustose lichens that live on rocks. Schaereria was first proposed by Gustav Wilhelm Körber in 1855 and was later taken up by other lichenologists despite periods of disuse.

Distinctive characteristics of species in the Schaereria genus include a crustose to squamulose thallus, ascomata (fruiting bodies) with a blackened ring and a blackish disk, and asci (spore-bearing cells) that lack tholus (a thickened part of the inner wall near the tip). The secondary chemistry of the genus produces specific substances, including the pigment known as Cinereorufa-green in Schaereria cinereorufa. The genus, having a cosmopolitan distribution, primarily favours cold to cool climates of the Northern Hemisphere. However, certain species have been identified in both polar regions and others in warmer locales like Queensland (Australia). Schaereria species often grow on siliceous rocks, with a few variants being epiphytic (plant-dwelling) or even lichen-dwelling. Various lichenicolous fungi and lichens have been observed to grow on Schaereria species.

== Systematics ==
=== Historical taxonomy ===
Genus Schaereria was named and circumscribed by the German lichenologist Gustav Wilhelm Körber in 1855, with Schaereria lugubris assigned as the type, and at the time, only species. According to Hannes Hertel and L. Zürn, it is clear that he was actually referring to Schaereria cinereorufa (Schaer.) Th.Fr., but he mistakenly believed he had Ropalospora lugubris (formerly Lecidea lugubris) on hand. For this reason, Körber's name is not available for the genus. Despite this, Schaereria was accepted a few years later (in 1860) by Theodor Magnus Fries, who used it in his work on Arctic, European, and Greenlandic lichens. It subsequently fell into disuse for more than a century after William Nylander placed it in synonymy with Lecidea. Josef Poelt and Antonín Vězda resurrected Schaereria in 1977, and included S. cinereorufa. The genus name honours the Swiss pastor and lichenologist Ludwig Emanuel Schaerer.

In 1989, David Leslie Hawksworth and John Charles David put forth a proposal to conserve the name Schaereria (as defined by Theodor Magnus Fries in 1874) for a group of species with S. cinereorufa as the type species, instead of using Schaereria as defined by Körber. The reason for this proposal is that S. cinereorufa is a well-known species under the name Schaereria, while Körber applied the name S. lugubris to a different species that should have been named S. cinereorufa. By conserving the name Schaereria as suggested, it avoids the need to create a new name for the same group of lichens and prevents confusion with another genus called Ropalospora. By accepting this proposal, both Ropalospora and Schaereria could continue to be used with their current meanings, avoiding any unnecessary changes. In the subsequent recommendations of the Committee for Fungi and Lichens, they agreed that it was desirable to conserve the genus with one of the original specimens used by the author, noting that this specimen was erroneously labelled Schaereria lugubris, but clearly belongs to S. cinereorufa.

Schaereria is one of several dozen genera whose species were previously included in the large genus Lecidea. However, Lecidea has a different ascus structure than Schaereria. The family Schaereriaceae was first proposed by French lichenologist Maurice Choisy in 1949, but he did not publish the name validly as it did not meet the criteria for publication as determined by the International Code of Nomenclature for algae, fungi, and plants. Josef Hafellner published the family name Schaereriaceae validly in 1984.

=== Classification ===
Hafellner noted some similarities in the characteristics of the hymenium between the Schaereriaceae and the order Pezizales, and the family was included there in the 1985 version of the Outline of the Ascomycota. This classification was later shown to be inappropriate as the Schaereriaceae do not have operculate asci—a characteristic of the Pezizales. After this the family was associated with either the Teloschistineae (a suborder of the Teloschistales), the Agyriineae (a suborder of the Lecanorales), or placed in the order Sarrameanales. Schaereria has also been included and excluded from the family Lecideaceae several times. Molecular studies that have included Schaereria species have shown that it occupies a relatively isolated phylogenetic position.

In 2018, H. Thorsten Lumbsch and Steven Leavitt proposed the new order Schaereriales to contain the family, segregating the order Schaereriales from Sarrameanales. They considered the Schaereriales to have "unresolved relationships" in the parent taxon, Ostropomycetidae. In their analysis, which used a "temporal" method to group together comparable ordinal and family ranks, Schaereriales has a sister group relationship with the order Sarrameanales. Both Schaereriales and Sarrameanales form a clade that is sister to the Baeomycetales. In a critical review of the temporal method for lichen classification, Robert Lücking found flaws in their analysis and rejected the proposed split, instead retaining both Sarrameanaceae and Schaereriaceae in the Sarrameanales.

== Description ==
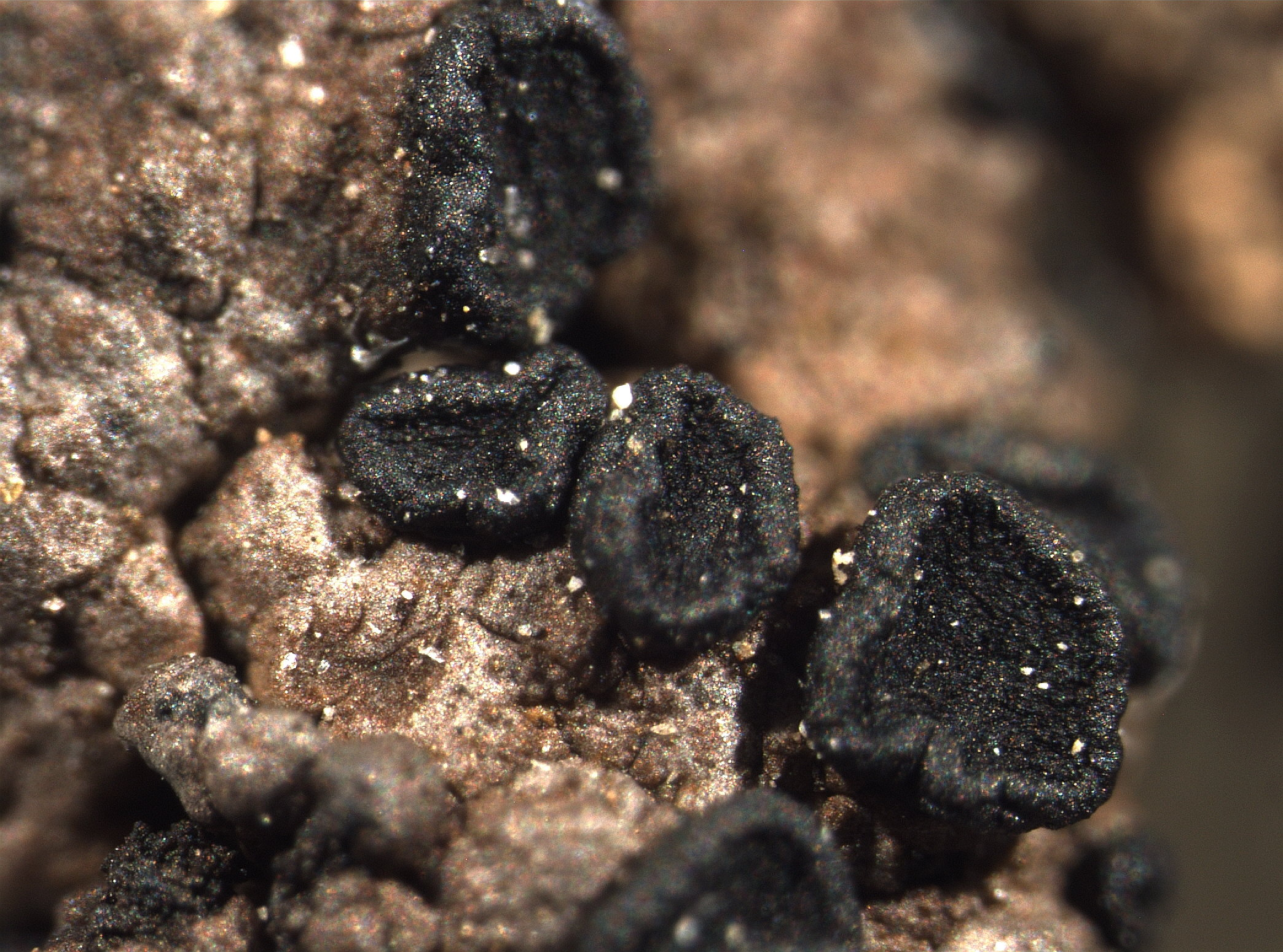
Closeup of lecideine ascomata of Schaereria cinereorufa

Several characteristics unite taxa in the order Schaereriales. These include: a thallus that is crustose to squamulose; a trebouxioid photobiont partner (spherical unicellular green algae); ascomata being lecideine (having an apothecium which lacks algae and lacks an amphithecium); apothecia that are hemiangiocarpous (meaning they open before the spores are mature); and a cup-shaped excipulum. Microscopic characteristics of the Schaereriales include asci of the Schaereria-type (lacking a tholus–the thickened inner part of an ascus tip), and ascospores that are hyaline, thin-walled, and one-celled (i.e., lacking septa). There are eight spores per ascus. The hamathecium contains non-amyloid, non-gelatinous, unbranched paraphyses. The secondary chemistry of this group includes depsides and unknown compounds. Schaereria cinereorufa produces a green- to turquoise-coloured insoluble lichen pigment known as Cinereorufa-green. The identification of species within Schaereria is primarily based on specific traits: the chemical composition and form of the thallus, the colouration of the apothecia, and the distinctive shape and organization of ascospores within the ascus.

== Anatomy and development ==
The anatomy and development of several Schaereria species have been studied in some detail. The genus displays a varied morphology, encompassing both crustose and squamulose lichens. For instance, Schaereria cinereorufa is characterised by a squamulose to bullate (blistered) thallus, often found on siliceous rocks, with sessile or marginally located apothecia. In contrast, S. corticola has a sparsely developed, endo- to episubstral thallus with soredia and sessile apothecia. Schaereria fuscocinerea, somewhat intermediate, features an areolate thallus on siliceous rocks, and its fruiting bodies are either immersed in or between areolae.

The anatomy within the genus is more consistent. In S. cinereorufa and S. fuscocinerea, the thallus is covered by an epinecral layer (a layer of dead fungal hyphae), and no distinct cortex is formed. However, the upper parts of the hyphae in the thallus are pigmented brownish. In contrast, S. corticola lacks a distinct upper layer, primarily consisting of soredia.

The development of Schaereria ascomata is somewhat variable depending on species. In S. cinereorufa, the ascomatal primordium begins as groups of ascogonia forming a more or less spherical cluster, followed by coiled ascogonia with trichogynes. The primordium eventually rises to the thallus's upper surface, with the upper part forming the hymenium. In S. corticola, spherical primordia with ascogonia are observed, becoming pigmented and forming the cup-shaped excipulum. True paraphyses replace the paraphysoidal network in the hamathecium. In S. fuscocinerea, ascogonia with trichogynes appear in the algal layer, with subsequent growth of paraphysoids, followed by the differentiation of ascogenous hyphae and true paraphyses.

== Habitat, distribution, and ecology ==
Collectively, the genus has a cosmopolitan distribution. The majority of Schaereria species inhabit cold to cool climates within the Northern Hemisphere. S. fuscocinerea, however, is an exception, as it can be found in both polar regions. Additionally, S. xerophila thrives in the lowland regions of Queensland. Schaereria species are typically found growing on rocky surfaces composed of siliceous materials. In contrast, S. corticola is bark-dwelling, S. dolodes is both bark- and wood-dwelling, S. corticola has an epiphytic lifestyle, while S. parasemella has a lichenicolous (lichen-dwelling) habit.

Some lichenicolous fungi and lichens have been recorded growing on Schaereria species. These include Endococcus perpusillus, Buellia miriquidica, Buellia uberior, and Halecania parasitica (the last three on Schaereria fuscocinerea). A Sclerococcum species in the S. australe–S. saxatile group has been reported infesting Schaereria bullata.

== Species ==
As of January 2024, Species Fungorum (in the Catalogue of Life) accepts 11 species of Schaereria.

- Schaereria albomarginata Øvstedal (2009)
- Schaereria argentina Gyeln. (1934)
- Schaereria australis Kantvilas (2023) – Australia
- Schaereria brunnea Björk, T.Sprib. & T.B.Wheeler (2009) – Canada
- Schaereria bullata Kantvilas (1999) – Tasmania
- Schaereria cinereorufa (Schaer.) Th.Fr. (1861) – Northern Hemisphere
- Schaereria corticola Muhr & Tønsberg (1992) – temperate Northern Hemisphere
- Schaereria dolodes (Nyl.) Schmull & T.Sprib. (2005) – western North America; Tasmania
- Schaereria fabispora Hertel & Zürn (1986) – Norway
- Schaereria fuscocinerea (Nyl.) Clauzade & Cl.Roux (1985) – cosmopolitan distribution
- Schaereria gresinonis (B.de Lesd.) Gyeln. (1937)
- Schaereria parasemella (Nyl.) Lumbsch (1997) – Finland
- Schaereria porpidioides Fryday & Common (2001) – Falkland Islands
- Schaereria serenior (Vain.) Vitik. (2004) – Fennoscandia
- Schaereria xerophila Rambold & H.Mayrhofer (1989) – Australia

=== Former species ===
Several taxa once classified in Schaereria have since been reduced to synonymy, or transferred to other genera. Examples include:

- Schaereria decipiens (Hedw.) Gyeln. (1937) is now known as Psora decipiens; similarly, Schaereria icterica (Mont.) Gyeln. (1937) is now Psora icterica.
- Both Schaereria endocyanea (Stirt.) Hertel & Gotth.Schneid. (1980) and Schaereria tenebrosa (Flot.) Hertel & Poelt 1980) are now considered synonymous with Schaereria fuscocinerea.
- Schaereria lugubris (Sommerf.) Körb. (1855) is now Ropalospora lugubris.
- Schaereria lurida (Dill. ex With.) Gyeln. (1937) is now Dermatocarpon luridum.
- Schaereria ostreata (Hoffm.) Gyeln. (1937) is now Hypocenomyce scalaris.
- Schaereria pissodes (Stirt.) Clauzade & Cl.Roux (1985) is now Clauzadeana macula.
