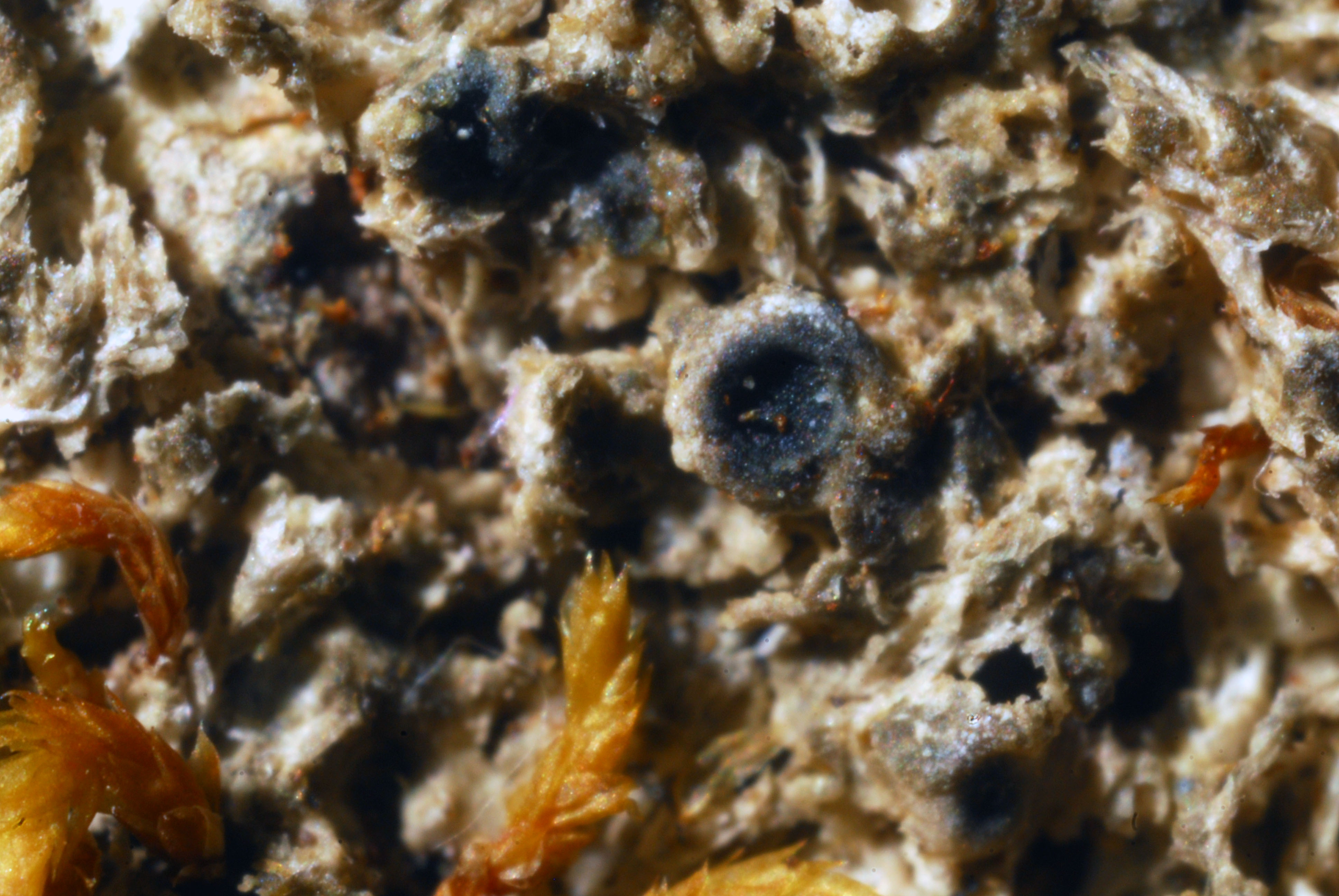

Scientific classification
- Domain: Eukaryota
- Kingdom: Fungi
- Division: Ascomycota
- Class: Lecanoromycetes
- Order: Thelenellales
- Family: Thelenellaceae
- Genus: Thelenella
- Species: T. muscorum

Binomial name
- Thelenella muscorum (Th.Fr.) Vain. (1899)

Synonyms
- List: Chromatochlamys muscorum (Th.Fr.) H.Mayrhofer & Poelt (1985); Chromatochlamys muscorum var. octospora (Nyl.) H.Mayrhofer & Poelt (1985); Microglaena holliana A.L.Sm. (1911); Microglaena muscorum Th.Fr. (1860); Microglaena muscorum f. octospora (Nyl.) Zahlbr. (1921); Microglaena muscorum var. octospora (Nyl.) Cretz. (1942); Thelenella muscorum var. octospora (Nyl.) Coppins & Fryday (2004); Verrucaria muscicola var. octospora Nyl. (1870); Verrucaria muscorum Frege (1812); Verrucaria muscorum Fr. (1825); Weitenwebera muscorum (Th.Fr.) Körb. (1863)

= Thelenella muscorum =

Species of lichen

Thelenella muscorum is a species of lichen belonging to the family Thelenellaceae.
