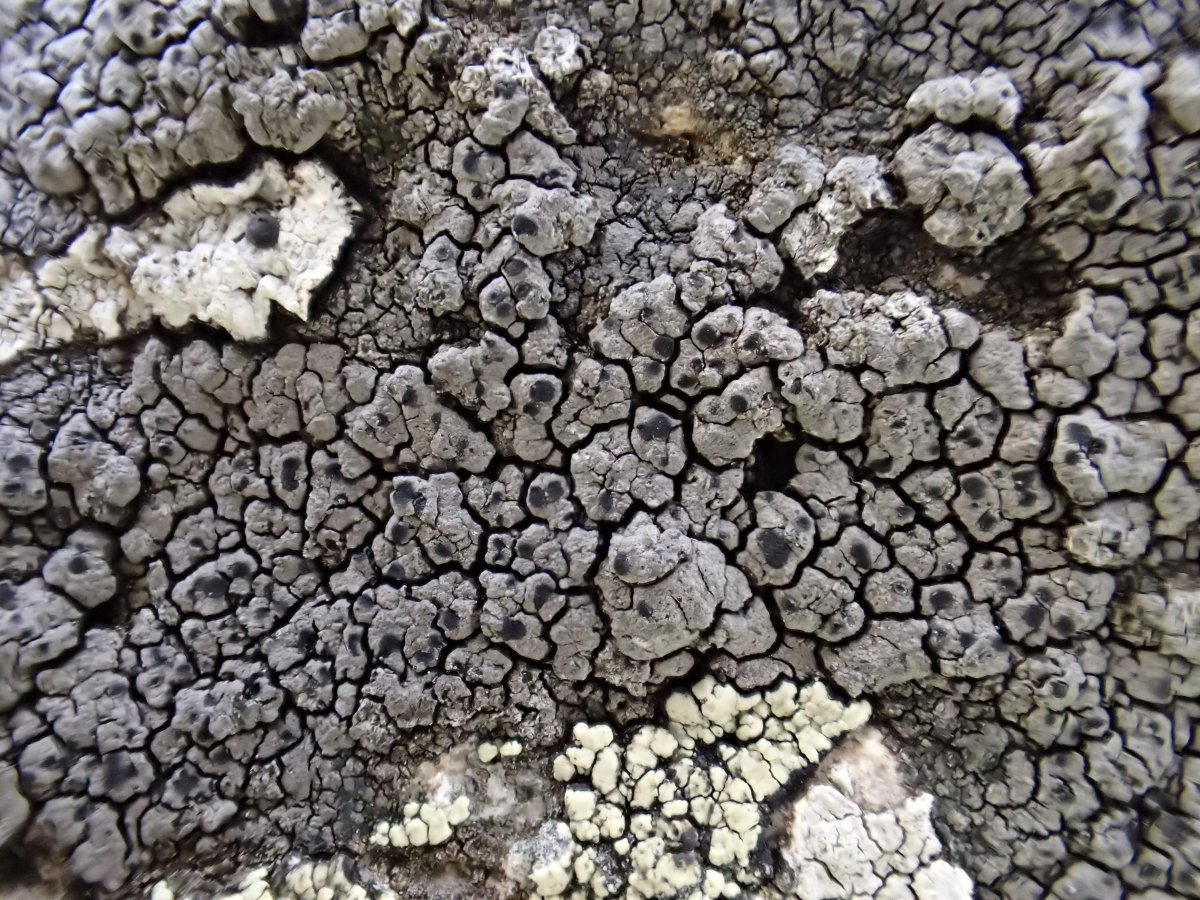
- in France

Scientific classification
- Domain: Eukaryota
- Kingdom: Fungi
- Division: Ascomycota
- Class: Lecanoromycetes
- Order: Schaereriales
- Family: Schaereriaceae
- Genus: Schaereria
- Species: S. fuscocinerea

Binomial name
- Schaereria fuscocinerea (Nyl.) Clauzade & Cl.Roux (1985)

Synonyms
- List: Aspicilia cambusiana Walt.Watson (1939); Aspicilia complanatoides (A.L.Sm.) Walt.Watson (1935); Aspicilia tenebrosa (Flot.) Körb. (1859); Aspicilia tenebrosa var. fuscocinerea (Nyl.) Boistel (1903); Biatora tenebrosa (Flot.) Oxner (1968); Lecanora cambusiana (Walt. Watson) Cretz. (1941); Lecanora complanatoides A.L.Sm. (1918); Lecanora tenebrosa (Flot.) Nyl. (1863); Lecidea atrocinerea var. tenebrosa (Flot.) Vain. (1934); Lecidea endocyanea Stirt. (1878); Lecidea fuscocinerea Nyl. (1852); Lecidea tenebrosa Flot. (1855); Lecidella tenebrosa (Flot.) Stein (1879); Schaereria endocyanea (Stirt.) Hertel & Gotth.Schneid. (1980); Schaereria fuscocinerea f. sorediata (Houmeau & Cl.Roux) Houmeau & Cl.Roux (2005); Schaereria fuscocinerea var. sorediata (Houmeau & Cl.Roux) Coppins (1992); Schaereria tenebrosa (Flot.) Hertel & Poelt (1980); Schaereria tenebrosa var. sorediata Houmeau & Cl.Roux (1982)

= Schaereria fuscocinerea =

Species of lichen

Schaereria fuscocinerea is a species of saxicolous (rock-dwelling), crustose lichen in the family Schaereriaceae. It was first formally described in 1852 by Finnish lichenologist William Nylander, as Lecidea fusco-cinerea. Georges Clauzade and Claude Roux transferred it to the genus Schaereria in 1985. The species has a cosmopolitan distribution and is found in both northern and southern hemispheres, where it grows on hard siliceous rocks, often in arctic and mountainous areas. Similar species include Lambiella gyrizans and L. mullensis, which can be distinguished from Schaereria fuscocinerea by microscopic and chemical characteristics.
