= Schaereria porpidioides =

Scientific classification
- Kingdom: Fungi
- Division: Ascomycota
- Class: Lecanoromycetes
- Order: Schaereriales
- Family: Schaereriaceae
- Genus: Schaereria
- Species: S. porpidioides

Binomial name
- Schaereria porpidioides Fryday & Common (2001)

Species of lichen

Schaereria porpidioides is a species of saxicolous (rock-dwelling), crustose lichen in the family Schaereriaceae. It is found in the Falkland Islands.

== Taxonomy ==
The species was formally described as a new to science in 2001 by lichenologists Alan Fryday and Ralph Common. It is only known from several collections made by Henry Imshaug and Richard Harris in 1968. The type collection was made from Mount Adam at an altitude between 670 and 700 m (2,200 and 2,300 ft), where it was found growing on exposed siliceous rocks located in feldmark on a summit ridge. Associated lichens include Neuropogon fasciata, Pertusaria spegazzinii, Poeltidea perusta, and Rhizocarpon geographicum. Rimularia andreaeicola was later identified as another common associate. The species epithet porpidioides alludes to the taxon's physical appearance, resembling a species from the genus Porpidia, such as P. macrocarpa (the authors note, however, that no direct systematic affiliation with that genus is implied).

== Description ==
The thallus is typically spread out and embedded, becoming noticeable between coarse sandstone grains as a creamy-white layer lacking a well-defined cortex. Occasionally, under microscopic observation, a few brown-pigmented cortical cells are discernible. The thallus generally spans substantial areas, up to 15–20 cm (6–8 in) in diameter. The thallus's internal structure, or medulla, shows a colour change to blue or red-purple when treated with iodine-potassium iodide (IKI). Accompanying the thallus are chlorococcoid photobionts, green microalgae with cell sizes ranging from 9 to 18 μm in diameter. The apothecia, or spore-bearing structures, are scattered, black or dark brown, and have a constricted base. They measure between 0.8 and 2.0 mm in diameter, and as they mature, they tend to become irregularly shaped. When wet, their disc can appear brown, and around them, a black protective layer can be observed. Other detailed microscopic features include the hymenium, which is clear and stands between 120 and 135 μm tall, asci that are cylindrical in shape, and ascospores that are broadly elliptical. The base structure, or hypothecium, consists of randomly oriented strands and transitions into a dark-brown layer. This complex structure is interspersed with large crystal groups, clearly visible under specialized lighting. Additionally, conidiomata, structures producing asexual spores, are black, not frequently found but usually present, and the conidia themselves are cylindrical in shape.
