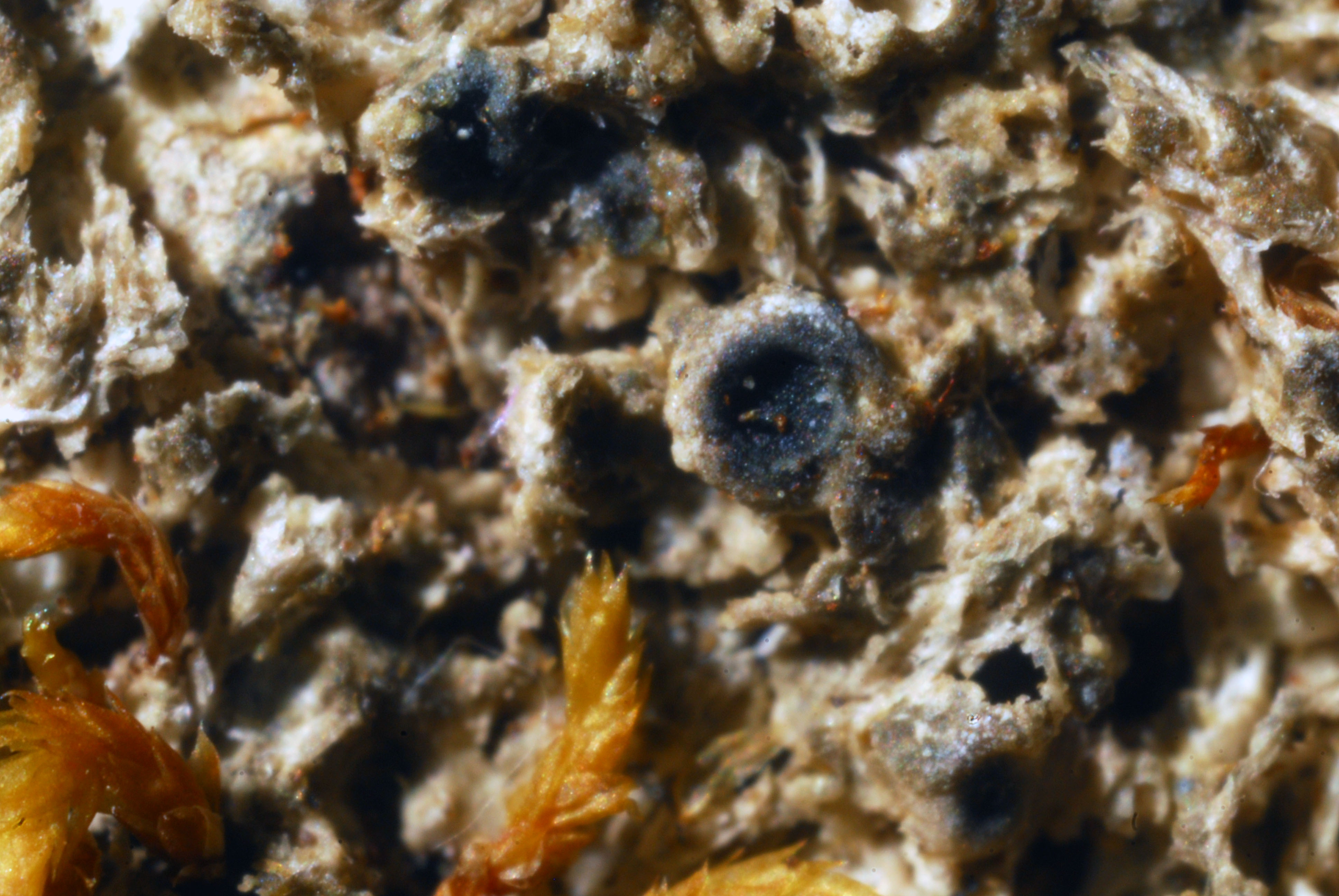
- Thelenella muscorum

Scientific classification
- Kingdom: Fungi
- Division: Ascomycota
- Class: Lecanoromycetes
- Order: Thelenellales
- Family: Thelenellaceae
- Genus: Thelenella; Nyl. (1855)

Type species
- Thelenella modesta (Nyl.) Nyl. (1855)

Species
- See text

Synonyms
- List: Microglaena Körb. (1855); Acrorixis Trevis. (1860); Luykenia Trevis. (1860); Aspidopyrenium Vain. (1890); Lecania sect. Secoligella Müll.Arg. (1890); Secoligella (Müll.Arg.) Vain. (1896); Patellonectria Speg. (1918); Porinopsis Malme (1928); Aspidopyrenis Clem. & Shear (1931); Aspidotheliomyces Cif. & Tomas. (1953)

= Thelenella =

Genus of lichens

Thelenella is a genus of lichen-forming fungi in the family Thelenellaceae. These inconspicuous lichens form thin, crust-like growths that are tightly attached to their substrates and appear as dull whitish, pale grey, or light brown patches. Species of Thelenella are commonly found in damp, shaded environments where they grow on tree bark, living leaves, moss cushions, rock faces, and moss-rich soil. The genus is distinguished by its thick-walled fruiting bodies that are mostly embedded within the lichen crust and contain multicellular spores with multiple cross-walls.

== Taxonomy ==
The genus was circumscribed by the Finnish lichenologist William Nylander in 1855, with Thelenella modesta assigned as the type species. In his original description, Nylander characterised Thelenella by its pore-like fruiting bodies with an immersed perithecium that was either uncoloured or only superficially pale. He noted that the spores were somewhat large, oblong, and multicellular, whilst the gelatinous hymenium remained entirely colourless. Nylander distinguished the genus as morphologically distinct, noting that the fruiting bodies were quite different from those of Verrucaria.

== Description ==
Thelenella forms an inconspicuous, crust‑like thallus that lies tightly attached to its substrate and ranges from thin, membranous patches to cracked or warted crusts in dull whitish, pale grey, or light brown tones. The photosynthetic partner is a minute, spherical green alga of the trebouxioid type, evenly distributed through the fungal tissue.

Sexual reproduction takes place in thick‑walled perithecia that are mostly immersed in the thallus. Their outer wall (exciple) is built of long, narrow cells arranged either lengthwise or in a tangled mesh; the pigment is evenly spread through this wall or diffused in a surrounding gel, never appearing grainy under high magnification. A second, darker protective layer (involucrellum) is rarely developed. Inside, the hymenial gel shows no reaction to iodine (I–, K/I–). Delicate, thread‑like paraphysoids branch and fuse, especially near their bases and tips, but they may be absent around the apical pore. The asci are fissitunicate, meaning they have two functional wall layers: a thin inner and a thicker outer one; they usually carry no iodine‑positive structures and contain two to eight ascospores. The spores themselves are colourless to slightly brown, with multiple cross‑walls that give them a somewhat muriformto strongly muriform appearance; their outer wall is only marginally thicker than the septa.

Asexual propagation is achieved by Roccella‑type pycnidia embedded in the thallus, which release colourless, rod‑shaped conidia lacking internal septa. No secondary metabolites (lichen products) have been detected in Thelenella species by thin-layer chromatography.

== Ecology ==
Species of Thelenella occupy a wide range of damp, shaded substrates. They most often grow directly on tree bark (corticolous) but can also colonise living leaves (foliicolous), bryophyte cushions on foliage (bryophilous), shaded rock faces (saxicolous), and patches of moss-rich soil (terricolous).

== Species ==
As of July 2025, Species Fungorum (in the Catalogue of Life) accepts 22 species of Thelenella.

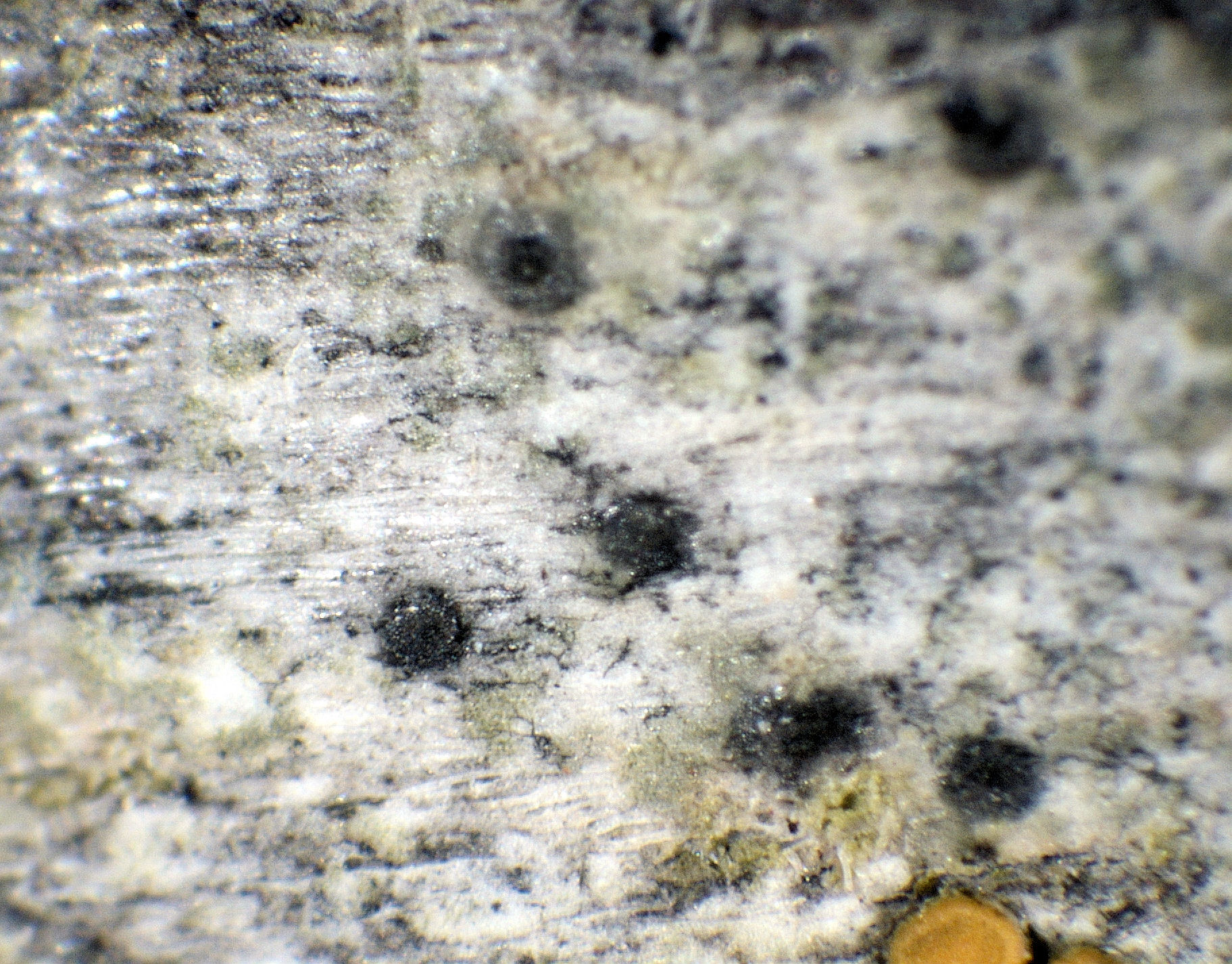
Thelenella melanospora

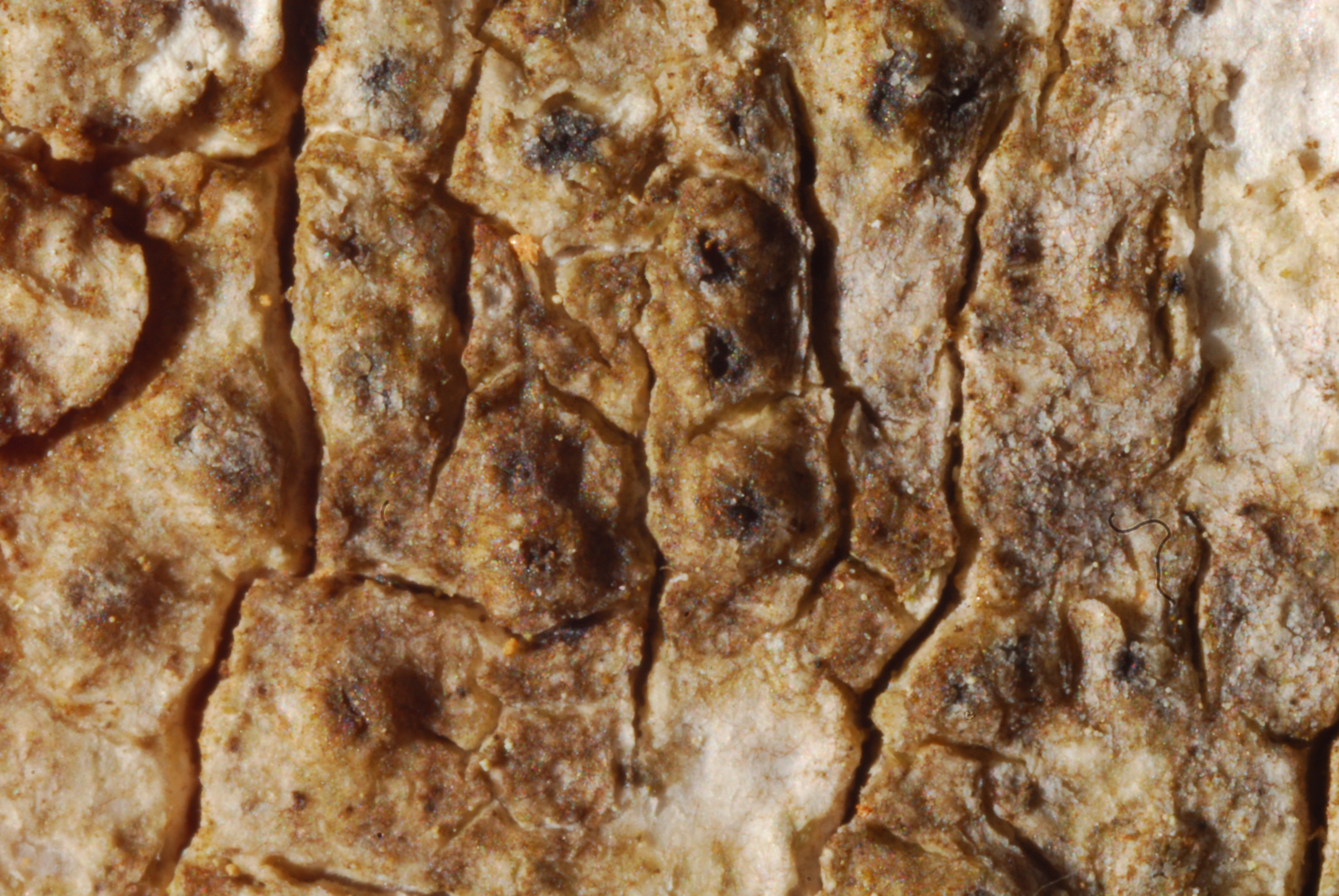
Thelenella modesta

- Thelenella brasiliensis (Müll.Arg.) Vain. (1896)
- Thelenella calcicola C.A.Morse (2016)
- Thelenella cinerascens (Vain.) R.C.Harris (1995)
- Thelenella fugiens (Müll.Arg.) R.C.Harris (1995)
- Thelenella fusispora Vězda & H.Mayrhofer (1987) – Tanzania
- Thelenella geminipara (Malme) R.C.Harris (1995)
- Thelenella haradae J.P.Halda, Xin Y.Wang, J.A.Ryu & Hur (2016) – South Korea
- Thelenella humilis R.C.Harris (1995)
- Thelenella indica Pinokiyo & Kr.P.Singh (2006) – India
- Thelenella inductula (Nyl. ex Hasse) H.Mayrhofer (1987)
- Thelenella justii (Servít) H.Mayrhofer & Poelt (1985)
- Thelenella kerguelena (Nyl.) H.Mayrhofer (1987)
- Thelenella larbalestieri (A.L.Sm.) Coppins & Fryday (2004)
- Thelenella lateralis Aptroot & M.Cáceres (2014)
- Thelenella luridella (Nyl.) H.Mayrhofer (1987)
- Thelenella luzonensis Räsänen (1949)
- Thelenella marginata (Groenh.) H.Mayrhofer (1987)
- Thelenella mawsonii (C.W.Dodge) H.Mayrhofer & P.M.McCarthy (1991)
- Thelenella melanospora Etayo & H.Mayrhofer (2003)
- Thelenella modesta (Nyl.) Nyl. (1855)
- Thelenella monospora Aptroot & M.Cáceres (2016) – Brazil
- Thelenella muscorum (Th.Fr.) Vain. (1899)
- Thelenella nubifera C.A.Morse (2016)
- Thelenella philippina Räsänen (1949)
- Thelenella rappii R.C.Harris (1995)
- Thelenella sampaiana (B.de Lesd.) H.Mayrhofer & Poelt (1985)
- Thelenella sastreana R.C.Harris (1995)
- Thelenella sychnogonioides (Zahlbr.) R.C.Harris (1995)
- Thelenella tasmanica H.Mayrhofer & P.M.McCarthy (1991)
- Thelenella vezdae (H.Mayrhofer & Poelt) Coppins & Fryday (2004)
- Thelenella weberi H.Mayrhofer (1987)
