= Schaereria bullata =

Scientific classification
- Domain: Eukaryota
- Kingdom: Fungi
- Division: Ascomycota
- Class: Lecanoromycetes
- Order: Schaereriales
- Family: Schaereriaceae
- Genus: Schaereria
- Species: S. bullata

Binomial name
- Schaereria bullata Kantvilas (1999)

Species of lichen

Schaereria bullata is a species of lichen in the family Schaereriaceae. It is found in the alpine regions of Tasmania, Australia. This lichen species is characterized by its dark brown to grey-brown thallus, which forms irregular patches over soil or bryophytes, and consists of granules that coalesce to create convex to bullate squamules. The lichen also features distinctive apothecia, which are roundish and typically superficial, and spherical spores.

== Taxonomy ==
Schaereria bullata was described by Australian lichenologist Gintaras Kantvilas. Its species epithet is derived from the Latin term bullato, referring to the bullate (convex) nature of its squamules. The type specimen for this species was found in Tasmania, specifically in the Legges Tor region, on skeletal soil or directly on flat rock surfaces in an alpine boulder field.

== Description ==
The thallus of S. bullata has a dark brown to grey-brown colouration, occasionally with hints of reddish brown. It forms scattered patches over soil or bryophytes, composed of granules that coalesce to create squamules. These squamules are convex to bullate and may lack a cortex, but they have an outer brownish layer. The photobiont cells within are irregularly roundish. The lichen also produces apothecia that are roundish and found either scattered or in clusters. These apothecia have a distinctive dark margin and a smooth to verruculose disc. The hymenium is colourless, while the epithecial layer can appear pale reddish brown or yellowish brown. Ascospores are spherical and uniseriate.

=== Similar species ===
In the alpine regions of Tasmania where Schaereria bullata thrives, several other lichen species share a similar habitat. These lichens, while distinct in their own right, can sometimes be mistaken for S. bullata due to overlapping ecological niches and certain superficial resemblances. Here are some of the similar species found in these high-altitude environments:

Cetraria australiensis: This lichen, commonly known as the "Australian Parmelia", often co-occurs with S. bullata. It features a fruticose thallus with branched structures, making it appear bushy. While it can resemble S. bullata at first glance, especially when the latter is not displaying its characteristic bullate squamules, a closer examination reveals the differences. C. australiensis lacks the granular squamules of S. bullata, and its growth form is fruticose rather than squamulose.

Cladonia bimberiensis: Another lichen found in Tasmania's alpine areas is C. bimberiensis, which consists of fruticose structures known as podetia. These podetia often grow upright and are densely covered in tiny cups or squamules at their tips. While the overall growth form is different from S. bullata, in certain growth stages, C. bimberiensis can resemble the bullate squamules of S. bullata. However, they can be distinguished by their growth form and the presence of podetia, which are absent in S. bullata.

Protoparmelia badia: This lichen is characterized by its crustose thallus, which forms a thin, continuous layer on rocks. While P. badia shares the alpine habitat of S. bullata, its morphology is strikingly different. Instead of squamules or podetia, it forms a smooth, crust-like layer that adheres closely to the substrate. The absence of bullate squamules or fruticose structures readily distinguishes P. badia from S. bullata.

Umbilicaria subglabra: U. subglabra is a fruticose lichen with a leafy, lobed thallus. It grows on rocks and boulders, especially in alpine environments. While the growth form of U. subglabra is distinct from S. bullata, they can sometimes share the same rock surfaces. However, the lobed and leafy appearance of U. subglabra is a clear distinguishing feature from the bullate squamules of S. bullata.

== Habitat and distribution ==
Schaereria bullata is primarily found in the alpine regions of Tasmania, with a few occurrences in the West Coast Range. It prefers horizontal rock plates with temporary moisture accumulation, where a thin layer of soil develops. This habitat places it between the exposed rock surfaces populated by crustose lichens and the moister rock crevices inhabited by bryophytes. The species has been recorded at altitudes above 900 m (3,000 ft) in boulder fields, scree slopes, and cliffs. S. bullata is one of five Schaereria species that are found in Australia.
