= Schaereria parasemella =

Scientific classification
- Domain: Eukaryota
- Kingdom: Fungi
- Division: Ascomycota
- Class: Lecanoromycetes
- Order: Schaereriales
- Family: Schaereriaceae
- Genus: Schaereria
- Species: S. parasemella

Binomial name
- Schaereria parasemella (Nyl.) Lumbsch (1997)

Synonyms
- Lecidea parasemella Nyl. (1868); Lecidea exigua subsp. parasemella (Nyl.) Nyl. (1888); Lecidella parasemella (Nyl.) Hertel (1981); Hafellnera parasemella (Nyl.) Houmeau & Cl.Roux (1984)

Species of lichen

Schaereria parasemella is a species of saxicolous (rock-dwelling), crustose lichen in the family Schaereriaceae. It is lichenicolous, meaning it grows on other lichens; its host species is Biatora vernalis. It has been recorded from Alaska, Greenland, Scandinavia, France, and Russia.

The species was first scientifically described in 1868 by the Finnish lichenologist William Nylander, as a species of Lecidea. Helge Thorsten Lumbsch transferred it to the genus Schaereria in 1997.
