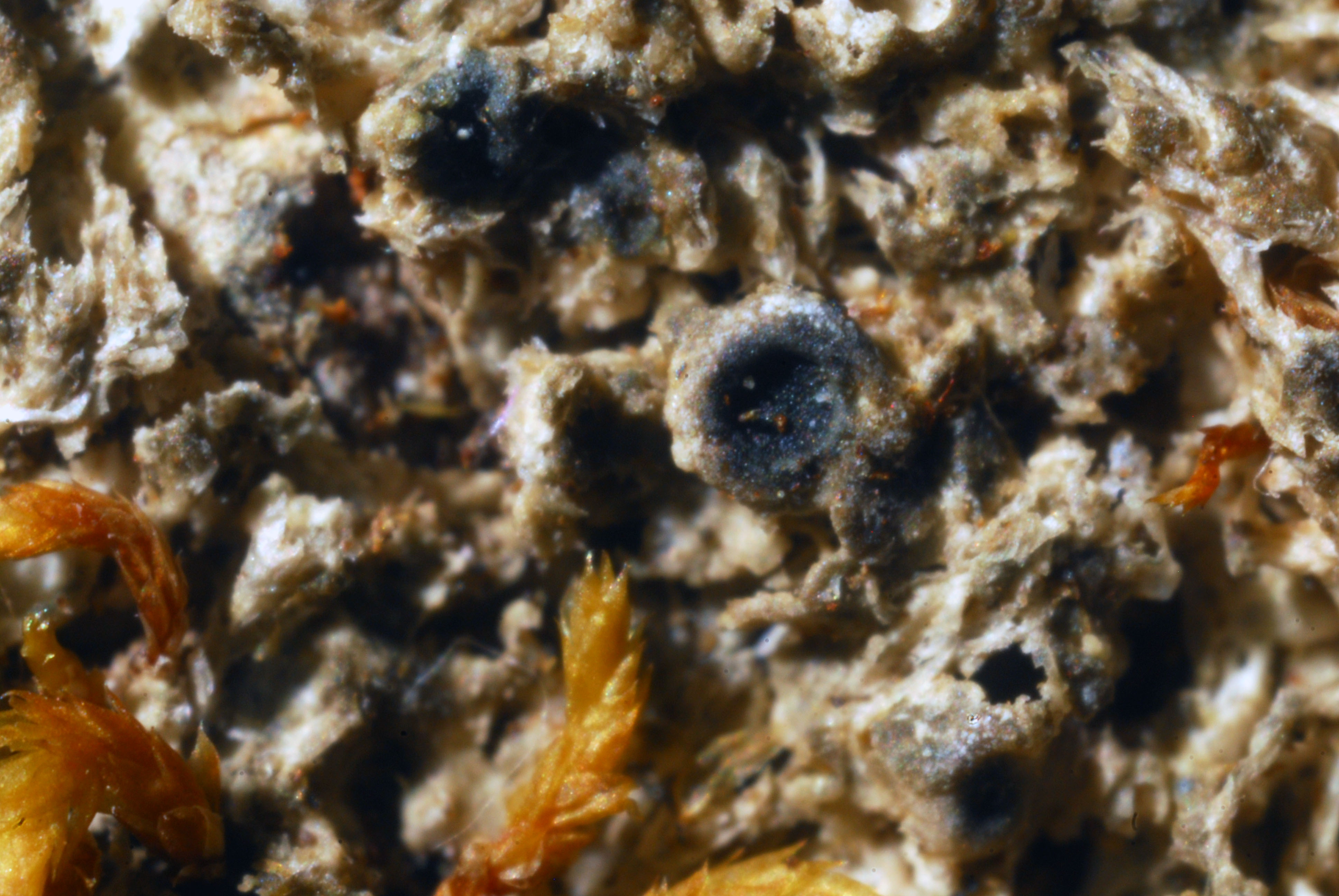
- Thelenella muscorum

Scientific classification
- Kingdom: Fungi
- Division: Ascomycota
- Class: Lecanoromycetes
- Order: Thelenellales; Lumbsch & Leavitt (2018)
- Family: Thelenellaceae; O.E.Erikss. ex H.Mayrhofer (1987)

Genera
- Aspidothelium; Chromatochlamys; Thelenella

Synonyms
- Aspidotheliaceae Räsänen ex J.C.David & D. Hawksw. (1991)

= Thelenellaceae =

Family of lichen-forming fungi

Thelenellaceae is a family of lichen-forming fungi. It is the sole family in the monotypic order Thelenellales, and contains three genera and about 50 species.

== Taxonomy ==
The family was initially proposed by Ove Erik Eriksson, and later formally published by Helmut Mayrhofer in 1987. The order Thelenellales, containing only family Thelenellaceae, was proposed by H. Thorsten Lumbsch and Steven Leavitt in 2018. However, the taxon was not validly published because "an identifier issued by a recognized repository was not cited in the protologue", contrary to rules of botanical nomenclature. This nomenclatural oversight was rectified later the same year in a separate publication.

Family Aspidotheliaceae, proposed to contain the single genus Aspidothelium, was later expanded to include Musaespora. Nelsen and colleagues, in their studies published in 2009 and 2011, observed only minimal differences between the Aspidotheliaceae and Thelenellaceae, suggesting the possibility of merging them into a single family. Harris, in 1995, already treated Aspidotheliaceae and Thelenellaceae as one family, alongside the genus Celothelium, while Eriksson and Hawksworth in 1998 proposed retaining Aspidotheliaceae as a separate entity until more taxa could be examined. Using molecular phylogenetics analysis, Nelsen and colleagues showed in 2017 that Aspidothelium is embedded within the family Thelenellaceae, and thus synonymous with it.

== Description ==
Family Thelenellaceae comprises lichens with a crustose thallus, which means the lichen forms a crusty, spread-out layer that appears effuse and sometimes breaks into small, angular patches known as areoles. The photosynthetic partner (photobiont) within these lichens is trebouxioid, a type of green alga. The reproductive structures, ascomata, are perithecial in form, either sitting freely (sessile) or slightly embedded in thalline warts on the lichen's surface. These structures are thick-walled and can be smooth, warted, or ridged, often featuring a broad apical shield and varying in colour from pale to dark brown. The opening of the ascomata, or ostiole, is surrounded by periphyses, hair-like structures that help protect and support the ascomata.

Internally, the Thelenellaceae family's ascomata contain a hamathecium made up of narrow, branched, and interconnected pseudoparaphyses, which are filamentous structures within the ascomata. Asci, the spore-producing cells, are thick-walled and may have a small ocular chamber at their apex, but they do not turn blue when stained with iodine. The ascospores produced are colourless, thin-walled, and may be transversely septate (divided by cross-walls) or muriform (divided by both cross and longitudinal walls), often developing a median septum within each cell. Some ascospores are surrounded by a gelatinous sheath.

For asexual reproduction, Thelenellaceae lichens produce pycnidia, which are small flask-shaped structures that generate asexual spores called conidia. These conidia are cylindrical, lack septa, and are colourless. There are no secondary metabolites (lichen products) that are known to occur in the family.

== Genera ==
This list of genera in the Thelenellaceae is based on a 2021 review and summary of fungal classification by Wijayawardene and colleagues. Following the genus name is the taxonomic authority (those who first circumscribed the genus; standardised author abbreviations are used), year of publication, and the number of species:

- Aspidothelium Vain. (1890) – 17 spp.
- Chromatochlamys Trevis. (1860) – 3 spp.
- Thelenella Nyl. (1855) – 30 spp.

Julella is a poorly known genus of non-lichenised fungi that is tentatively included in the Thelenellaceae by some sources, while other sources include it in the Trypetheliaceae or as a genus of "unconfirmed affinities". In their 2021 treatment of the Thelenellaceae in the Revisions of British and Irish Lichens series, Cannon and Orange suggest that there is "no convincing morphological distinction between" the genera Chromatochlamys and Thelenella, and they consider Thelenella in a broad sense to include Chromatochlamys.

== Habitat and distribution ==
Lichens in the family grow on bark, on leaves, on bryophytes, or on rocks. Collectively, the species in the family have a widespread distribution.
