= Pseudotichia =

Scientific classification
- Kingdom: Fungi
- Division: Ascomycota
- Class: Lichinomycetes
- Order: Lichinales
- Family: Lichinaceae
- Genus: Pseudotichia; M.Schultz & M.Prieto (2024)
- Species: P. vermiculata

Binomial name
- Pseudotichia vermiculata (Nyl.) M.Schultz & M.Prieto (2024)

Synonyms
- Collemopsis vermiculata Nyl. (1881); Psorotichia vermiculata (Nyl.) Forssell (1885)

Genus of lichens

Pseudotichia is a fungal genus in the family Lichinaceae. It comprises the single species Pseudotichia vermiculata, a cyanolichen. Originally described in 1881 from material collected near Budapest, the species was later placed in Psorotichia before molecular studies demonstrated it represents a separate evolutionary line. It grows on calcareous rocks that are periodically wetted by seeping water, favouring exposed limestone surfaces. The lichen can be recognised by its dark, cracked crust with mostly embedded fruiting bodies and a distinctive cottony layer of fungal filaments anchoring it to the rock substrate.

== Taxonomy ==
The genus Pseudotichia was introduced to hold a single species, Pseudotichia vermiculata, which had long been known under other names. The species was originally described in 1881 by William Nylander, who introduced it as Collemopsis vermiculata on the basis of material collected by Hugó Lojka from dolomitic rock near Budapest; he characterised it as a dark, sooty to brown-black, tile-cracked crustose lichen with immersed brown apothecia and simple ellipsoid spores, and noted its similarity to C. caesia. A few years later (1885), it was later transferred to Psorotichia as Psorotichia vermiculata. Molecular work has shown that it does not belong with Psorotichia in the strict sense but instead forms a separate lineage within Lichinaceae, warranting recognition of a new genus. The generic name refers to this history: Pseudotichia is named for its overall resemblance to Psorotichia, with the prefix "pseudo-" indicating that the similarity is superficial rather than reflecting a close relationship.

The re-circumscription of Pseudotichia vermiculata emphasises several morphological traits that separate Pseudotichia from its former allies. Compared with Psorotichia, it has fruiting bodies (apothecia) that are mostly embedded in the surrounding thallus and bordered only by a shallow, poorly defined rim derived from the thallus, rather than sharply delimited, strongly raised discs. These fruiting bodies have a well-developed internal margin (the proper exciple) and often appear rough and knobbed because bands of sterile fungal tissue intrude into the spore-bearing layer and divide it into chambers. The thick, blocky thallus units sit on a cottony mass of anchoring hyphae at the base, which is also distinctive. The genus differs from superficially similar lichen genera such as Pyrenocarpon, Lapismalleus, Metamelanea, Collemopsis and Porocyphus in this combination of embedded, chambered fruiting bodies and the cottony basal layer beneath the thallus. These characters, together with its separate position in phylogenetic analyses, support recognition of Pseudotichia as a distinct genus.

== Description ==
In its sole species, Pseudotichia vermiculata, the thallus forms a dark, crust-like growth closely attached to calcareous rock. It is built from sharply angular, more or less flat areoles (small, tile-like patches) about 0.4–1 mm across and up to around 1 mm thick. Fresh thalli are blackish to very dark brown, but the surface can weather to a dirty grey when the outer layer erodes. The surface is rough rather than smooth, and the areoles together form a continuous crust. The lichen is anchored to the rock by fungal filaments that extend downwards from the underside of the thallus and interweave into a conspicuous cottony basal layer.

Internally, the thallus is ecorticate, meaning it lacks a separate protective skin or cortex. Instead, it is more or less homoiomerous: the fungal and photosynthetic components are intermixed through most of the tissue rather than arranged in sharply defined layers. The fungal filaments form a paraplectenchymatous tissue, where short-celled hyphae intersect in a brick-like network around the single-celled cyanobacterial partner. Towards the upper surface the hyphae are less clearly defined, while deeper in the thallus they become more vertical and loosely arranged, with thick, gelatinous walls; many of these hyphae die off as they approach the cottony base. Mineral particles and colonies of associated microorganisms are often trapped within this basal region. The photobiont is a coccoid cyanobacterium: its roughly spherical (globose) cells form densely packed groups surrounded by a thin gelatinous sheath, which tends to be yellowish brown near the surface and colourless in the interior of the thallus.

The sexual reproductive structures are apothecia that are up to about 0.8 mm across. They are cryptolecanorine: the discs are partly hidden in the thallus and bordered only by a very low, indistinct rim formed from the thallus itself. The discs are roundish or slightly distorted, dark reddish brown, and may be shallowly concave or nearly flat. As they age, they become rough and develop multiple low humps (umbones), giving the surface a lumpy appearance. This unevenness reflects the internal anatomy: the spore-bearing layer (hymenium) is quite tall and is repeatedly cut by intruding bands of sterile hyphae, breaking it into separate chambers. The apothecia have a well-developed proper exciple, a pale reddish to brownish ring of tissue that surrounds and supports the hymenium. Within the hymenium, slender paraphyses (sterile threads between the asci) are conspicuous; they are septate, become looser and more branched towards their tips, and end in slightly swollen, bead-like terminal cells. The asci are of the Lichina type and react blue in iodine after treatment with potassium hydroxide solution, a diagnostic staining reaction. Each ascus contains eight ascospores that are colourless, single-celled and ellipsoid to broadly ellipsoid; older spores often develop thick walls, becoming oversized and sometimes almost spherical. The ascomata develop from female structures (ascogones) that arise within a tangle of generative hyphae. Asexual fruiting bodies (pycnidia) are not known in the material examined, and chemical tests have not revealed any characteristic lichen substances.

== Habitat and distribution ==
Pseudotichia vermiculata is currently confirmed from western Romania, the source of the material examined in recent studies. Nylander's type collection was made on dolomitic rock near Budapest, indicating that the species has also occurred on calcareous rocks in that region. It grows on exposed limestone and other calcareous rocks moistened by seeping water. Prieto and co-authors note that other published records should be treated with caution, but consider the species likely to occur in other suitable calcareous habitats in southern Europe.
