= Lingolemma =

Scientific classification
- Kingdom: Fungi
- Division: Ascomycota
- Class: Lichinomycetes
- Order: Lichinales
- Family: Lichinaceae
- Genus: Lingolemma; M.Schultz & M.Prieto (2024)
- Species: L. lingulatum

Binomial name
- Lingolemma lingulatum (Tuck.) M.Schultz & M.Prieto (2024)

Synonyms
- Omphalaria lingulata Tuck. (1862); Thyrea lingulata (Tuck.) Zahlbr. (1924); Lempholemma lingulatum (Tuck.) Henssen (1969)

Genus of lichens

Lingolemma is a fungal genus in the family Lichinaceae. It comprises the single species Lingolemma lingulatum, a rock-dwelling cyanolichen. Originally described from Cuba in 1862 and later placed in Lempholemma, the species was shown by molecular studies in 2024 to represent a distinct lineage, leading to the description of the new genus Lingolemma. The lichen forms small, tongue-shaped lobes attached to rock at their base, with a characteristic central strand of fungal threads running through each lobe. It grows on dry coastal limestone in the Caribbean region, favouring exposed surfaces subject to wind and periodic sea spray.

== Taxonomy ==
Lingolemma was established by Matthias Schultz and María Prieto to accommodate the rock-dwelling cyanobacterial lichen previously known as Lempholemma lingulatum. The generic name combines the Latin word lingua ('tongue') with the common lichen-generic ending "-lemma", referring to the tongue-shaped lobes that characterise the thallus of the only known species. Lingolemma lingulatum is the type and only species of the genus.

The species was originally described by Edward Tuckerman in 1862 as Omphalaria lingulata, based on material collected by Charles Wright from rocks at "Farallones la Cavalina" near Sagra on the island of Cuba. In his protologue, Tuckerman characterised the lichen as a thin, cartilaginous, umbilicate thallus divided into oblong to tongue-shaped lobes and bearing numerous minute, pale apothecia with simple, colourless, oblong-ellipsoid spores about two to three times longer than wide. Alexander Zahlbruckner later transferred the taxon to Thyrea as Thyrea lingulata in 1923. It was then reclassified in Lempholemma as Lempholemma lingulatum when its Nostoc-bearing thallus and overall morphology were judged by Aino Henssen to fit that broadly defined genus. Molecular phylogenetic analyses, together with a reassessment of thallus anatomy and fruiting body development, showed that this species does not belong to Lempholemma in the strict sense but instead forms an independent lineage within the family Lichinaceae. This led Schultz and Prieto to propose the new combination Lingolemma lingulatum and to recognise Lingolemma as a separate genus.

These same studies demonstrated that the traditional, wide concept of Lempholemma actually encompassed several unrelated groups of species, which differ in thallus form, anatomy and the way their ascomata develop. As a result, the former Lempholemma species were redistributed into a set of smaller, morphologically more coherent genera. In this framework, Lingolemma accommodates the rock-dwelling, squamulose–peltate species with tongue-like lobes, a well-developed central hyphal strand, typical apothecia, and a Nostoc photobiont, and it is placed near the Lichina–Gloeoheppia clade within Lichinaceae.

== Description ==
The thallus of Lingolemma lingulatum forms small, peltate squamules: tiny, shield-like lobes that are attached to the substrate only at their base. These lobes are convex and distinctly tongue-shaped, with margins that tend to curl upwards. The thallus lacks a differentiated cortex, so the upper surface is formed directly by a loose network of fungal hyphae. Within this tissue, chains of the cyanobacterium Nostoc are arranged in a reticulate pattern and are gathered into a conspicuous central strand that runs through each lobe. This combination of a tongue-shaped, squamulose–peltate thallus and a central hyphal strand is a key feature of the genus.

The sexual reproductive structures are minute apothecia that are largely immersed in the thallus, appearing at the surface only as tiny, pin-prick-like discs. Anatomically, the apothecia are zeorine in form: the margin is composed of both the specialised tissue of the fruiting body (the proper exciple) and a thin zone of thallus tissue (the thalline margin). The asci are of the Lichina type, an ascus form characteristic of many members of the Lichinaceae, and contain eight simple, colourless, broadly ellipsoid ascospores measuring about 10–15 × 4.5–7 μm. The hymenium shows an amyloid reaction, turning blue when treated with Lugol's iodine after pretreatment with potassium hydroxide, indicating the presence of starch-like compounds in the ascus walls. The ascomata develop from ascogones produced within a tangle of generative hyphae, a developmental pathway shared with some other saxicolous members of the Lichinaceae. Secondary metabolites have not yet been investigated in this species using thin-layer chromatography.

=== Similar species ===
In the field, Lingolemma lingulatum can resemble other small, dark, squamulose–peltate cyanobacterial lichens that occupy dry, rocky sites, such as species of Anema, Lichinella, Paulia, Peltula, Peccania and Thyrea. However, it differs from these genera in its specific Nostoc photobiont associations and in the combination of a central hyphal strand and immersed apothecia. It is particularly similar to Peltolemma socotranum, which also has a peltate thallus, but Peltolemma lacks a central hyphal strand and has larger, more raised apothecia. Lingolemma lingulatum may also be confused with Pycnolemma polycarpum, but that species has more deeply divided, adpressed lobes and produces pycnoascocarps (a different type of compound fruiting body) rather than the typical apothecia seen in Lingolemma.

== Habitat and distribution ==
Lingolemma lingulatum is known from dry, coastal calcareous rocks in the Caribbean region. In Bermuda, it has been recorded growing in sheltered parts of the supralittoral zone on hard limestone, alongside Leptogium austroamericanum.
