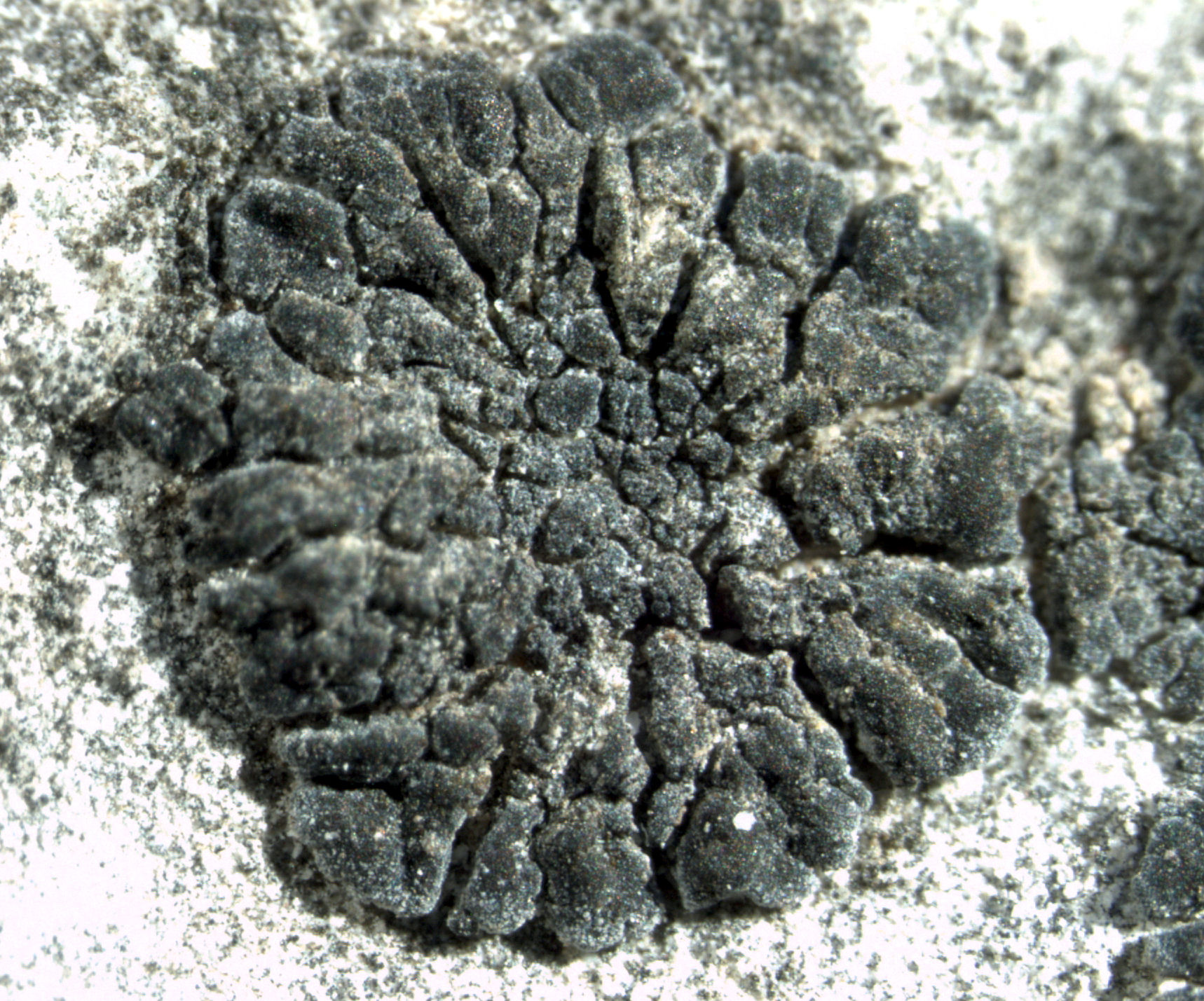
- Forssellia affinis

Scientific classification
- Kingdom: Fungi
- Division: Ascomycota
- Class: Lichinomycetes
- Order: Lichinales
- Family: Lichinaceae
- Genus: Forssellia; Zahlbr. (1906)

Type species
- Forssellia affinis (A.Massal.) Zahlbr. (1906)

Species
- F. affinis F. canariensis F. concordatula F. umbilicata

= Forssellia =

Genus of lichen-forming fungi

Forssellia is a genus of lichen-forming fungi in the family Lichinaceae. It includes four species. The genus was established in 1906 but later merged into Pterygiopsis until molecular analyses published in 2024 indicated that it represents a distinct lineage. Species form dark, crustose growths on calcareous or other mineral-rich rocks that become conspicuously gelatinous when moistened, and they produce distinctive pycnoascocarps—fruiting bodies combining sexual and asexual features. Found mainly across the Northern Hemisphere, Forssellia lichens typically inhabit well-lit, mineral-rich rocks that are temporarily wetted by seepage or along lake shores.

== Taxonomy ==
Forssellia was introduced as a genus of lichen-forming fungi in 1906 by Alexander Zahlbruckner in Engler and Prantl's Die Natürlichen Pflanzenfamilien, where he treated it as a segregate of Enchylium and recognised two species, of which F. affinis occurred on limestone and dolomite in central and southern Europe; he did not designate a type species, and Forssellia affinis was later selected as the type by Clements and Shear in 1931. The genus belongs to a group of dark, gelatinous cyanolichens traditionally placed in several "pyrenopsoid" genera.

Later authors treated these species within an expanded concept of Pterygiopsis, but molecular phylogenetic analyses have shown that Pterygiopsis in this broad sense actually comprises two main lineages. One contains Pterygiopsis atra and represents Pterygiopsis in the strict sense, whereas the other includes F. affinis, F. umbilicata and F. canariensis (the "affinis group") together with material previously referred to Pterygiopsis coracodiza (now treated under F. concordatula). This latter assemblage forms a supported clade with the genus Anema, although the exact relationships among these genera are still not fully resolved. Monophyly tests indicated that a group containing all the species with pycnoascocarps (mixed sexual–asexual fruiting bodies) is plausible, and on this basis the name Forssellia has been reinstated for this lineage.

Four species are recognised in Forssellia as part of the 2024 revision, but unpublished sequence data suggest that additional, as yet undescribed species occur in Europe and Arabia, and the recently described Pyrenopsis chejudoensis may also belong in Forssellia rather than in any of the other pyrenopsoid genera. Some species still retained in Pterygiopsis may likewise require transfer once their affinities have been re-evaluated, whereas material referred to Forssellia neglecta is now treated in the genus Thelignya.

== Description ==
Species of Forssellia form dark, usually blackish to brown thalli (lichen bodies) that are tightly attached to the rock. The thallus is crustose, meaning it forms a crust-like layer on the surface, but it may develop a more radiating outline (effigurate) or break up into small, scale-like squamules in some specimens. In dry conditions the surface can appear dull to slightly grey and powdery (pruinose), while in wet conditions the thallus becomes distinctly gelatinous. Attachment to the substrate is achieved by fine fungal strands (rhizohyphae), a gelatinous basal layer, or a small umbilicus anchored at a single point, which may show a purplish tint. The thallus lacks a differentiated outer cortex (it is ecorticate) and is composed of tightly packed fungal tissue with the hyphae arranged in a more or less fan-shaped or vertical pattern. The photosynthetic partner is a single-celled cyanobacterium, whose cells sit in yellowish-brown, sometimes reddish, gelatinous sheaths.

The sexual reproductive structures (apothecia) are small and range from partly immersed in the thallus to sitting on the surface. They are zeorine in form, with a conspicuous rim of thallus tissue surrounding only a thin proper exciple. Internally, the spore-bearing layer (hymenium) contains septate paraphyses and stains blue in a potassium hydroxide/Lugol's iodine test, a feature typical of this group. The asci are of the Lichina type (prototunicate) and may contain the usual eight ascospores or many more. The ascospores are colourless, non-septate, broadly ellipsoid to almost spherical, and relatively small. The ascomata are interpreted as pycnoascocarps, combining features of both apothecia and asexual fruiting bodies. In addition, Forssellia produces immersed to slightly raised pycnidia (flask-shaped asexual structures) with simple conidiophores that generate small, ellipsoid pycnospores at their tips. No secondary metabolites have been detected in the genus using thin-layer chromatography.

== Habitat and distribution ==
Forssellia species usually grow on calcareous or otherwise mineral-rich, only rarely acidic, inclined rock in well-lit situations that are temporarily or occasionally moistened by seeping water. They also occur in semi-aquatic habitats along lake margins. The genus is mainly recorded from the Northern Hemisphere, from boreal to subtropical regions.

== Species ==
- Forssellia affinis (A.Massal.) Zahlbr. (1906)
- Forssellia canariensis (Henssen) M.Schultz & M.Prieto (2024)
- Forssellia concordatula (Nyl.) M.Schultz & M.Prieto (2024)
- Forssellia umbilicata Vězda (1978)
