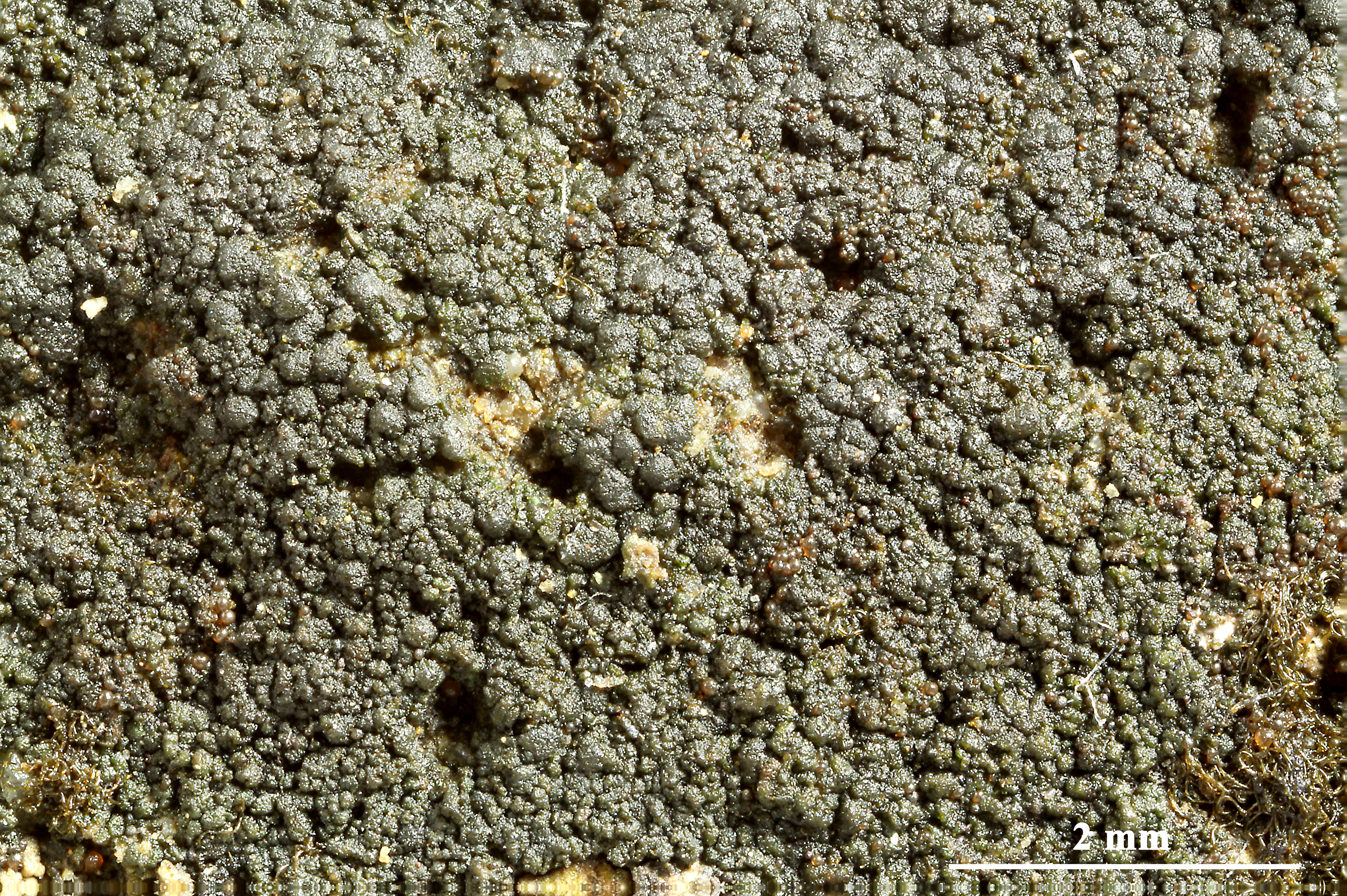
- Collemopsis schaereri on sandstone in Taichung County, Taiwan

Scientific classification
- Kingdom: Fungi
- Division: Ascomycota
- Class: Lichinomycetes
- Order: Lichinales
- Family: Lichinaceae
- Genus: Collemopsis; Nyl. ex Cromb. (1874)
- Species: C. schaereri

Binomial name
- Collemopsis schaereri (A.Massal.) Cromb. (1874)

Synonyms
- List: Pannaria schaereri A.Massal. (1852); Biatora schaereri (A.Massal.) Hepp (1860); Psorotichia schaereri (A.Massal.) Arnold (1869); Pyrenopsis schaereri (A.Massal.) Nyl. (1869); Trachyderma schaereri (A.Massal.) Trevis. (1869); Synalissa schaereri (A.Massal.) Tuck. (1872)

= Collemopsis =

Single-species fungal genus

Collemopsis is a fungal genus in the family Lichinaceae. It comprises the single species Collemopsis schaereri, a cyanolichen. Originally described in 1852 and later placed in Psorotichia, the species was shown through molecular studies to represent a distinct lineage, prompting the reinstatement of Collemopsis as a separate genus in 2024. The lichen forms dark, crustose growths on calcareous and other mineral-rich rocks that turn gelatinous when wet, with small fruiting bodies ranging from partly immersed to surface-sitting. Widespread across the Northern Hemisphere from boreal to subtropical zones, it typically inhabits well-lit rock faces that are periodically moistened and can also grow on mortar and brick.

== Taxonomy ==
The name Collemopsis was first introduced by William Nylander in 1873 in a footnote, without any formal description, which made it an invalid nomen nudum. The genus was validly described the following year by Crombie, who provided a short diagnosis in the Journal of Botany and included five crustose, but now known to be unrelated, species: C. schaereri, C. lecanopsides (now placed in Porocyphus as P. coccodes), C. furfurella (also treated as P. coccodes), C. oblongans (now Lemmopsis oblongans), and C. diffundens (now Porocyphus rehmicus). Collemopsis was later lectotypified with C. schaereri by Jørgensen and Henssen, who at the same time treated the genus as a synonym of Psorotichia.

Subsequent molecular work showed that Psorotichia as then understood is divided into five distantly related clades. Material identified as C. schaereri forms a clade together with species of Pycnolemma and Peltolemma, which share the presence of both apothecia and pycnoascocarps. Although Ellis had earlier illustrated the ascomata of C. schaereri as typical apothecia, pycnoascocarps were repeatedly observed in the material revised for the molecular study, though not in the lectotype; because of this inconsistency, this character was not used in ancestral state reconstructions. The new phylogenetic results showed that the species long treated as Psorotichia schaereri is not closely related to P. murorum, the type species of Psorotichia. On this basis, Collemopsis has been reinstated as a separate genus, resurrected from synonymy with Psorotichia to accommodate the single, variable and widely distributed species Collemopsis schaereri.

== Description ==
Collemopsis schaereri forms a dark, usually blackish to deep brown thallus that adheres closely to the rock surface. The thallus is crustose, forming a thin crust, and in some specimens it develops thicker blocks that can become somewhat scale-like (subsquamulose). Parts of the surface may turn grey and finely powdery (pruinose), especially in older areas. When wet, the thallus becomes distinctly gelatinous. It is fastened to the substrate by fine fungal strands (rhizohyphae). Internally, the thallus lacks a differentiated outer cortex (it is ecorticate) and consists of tightly packed, small-celled fungal tissue (paraplectenchyma) forming a dense network. The photosynthetic partner is a single-celled cyanobacterium whose cells are surrounded by thin, yellowish-brown gelatinous sheaths.

The sexual reproductive structures (apothecia) are small and range from partly immersed in the thallus to sitting on the surface. They are zeorine in form, with a distinct rim of thallus tissue (thalline margin) that surrounds only a thin, often pale yellowish proper exciple. The spore-bearing layer (hymenium) contains septate paraphyses and stains blue in a potassium hydroxide/Lugol's iodine test. The asci are of the Lichina type and contain eight spores. The tissue beneath the hymenium (subhymenium and hypothecium) often extends downward as a short stalk. Ascomata develop from a tangle of generative hyphae, and pycnoascocarps have been observed in revised material. Asexual structures include immersed to slightly raised pycnidia (flask-shaped conidiomata). These have simple conidiophores that bear small, ellipsoid pycnospores at their tips. No secondary metabolites have been detected in C. schaereri using thin-layer chromatography.

== Habitat and distribution ==
Collemopsis schaereri usually grows on calcareous or otherwise mineral-rich rock, only rarely on acidic substrates, and can also occur on artificial materials such as mortar and brick. It favours inclined, well-lit rock faces that are temporarily or occasionally moistened by seeping water. The species is widespread in the Northern Hemisphere, from boreal to subtropical regions, while older records from the Southern Hemisphere still require confirmation.
