= Paludolemma =

Scientific classification
- Kingdom: Fungi
- Division: Ascomycota
- Class: Lichinomycetes
- Order: Lichinales
- Family: Lichinaceae
- Genus: Paludolemma; M.Schultz & M.Prieto (2024)
- Species: P. syreniarum

Binomial name
- Paludolemma syreniarum (C.J.Lewis & M.Schultz) M.Schultz & M.Prieto (2024)

Synonyms
- Lempholemma syreniarum C.J.Lewis & M.Schultz (2019)

Single-species lichen genus

Paludolemma is a fungal genus in the family Lichinaceae. It comprises the single species Paludolemma syreniarum, a semi-aquatic cyanolichen. Originally described as Lempholemma syreniarum in 2019 from collections made in southern Ontario, the species was reclassified into the new genus Paludolemma in 2024 based on molecular and morphological evidence. It grows on the lower trunks of deciduous trees in seasonally flooded swamp forests, forming dark gelatinous crusts in the zone between high and low water marks. This semi-aquatic, bark-dwelling lifestyle is unusual among cyanolichens in its family, most of which grow on rocks rather than tree bark.

== Taxonomy ==
Paludolemma was established by Matthias Schultz and María Prieto in 2024 to accommodate a single bark-dwelling species from eastern Canada that had been published in 2019 as Lempholemma syreniarum by Christopher Lewis and Schultz, based on material from seasonally flooded deciduous forests in southern Ontario. The type and only species is Paludolemma syreniarum.

The generic name combines the Latin word palus ('swamp') with the name of the crustose cyanolichen genus Lempholemma, referring to the swamp-forest habitat of the lichen and its association with a Nostoc cyanobiont. Schultz and Prieto segregated the species from Lempholemma on the basis of a suite of morphological, developmental and ecological features supported by molecular data. Paludolemma resembles Lemmopsis in its crustose growth form and in having fruiting bodies (apothecia) with a soon-receding thalline margin, but differs in possessing densely coiled chains of Nostoc-like cyanobacteria and a strictly corticolous, semi-aquatic ecology. It is distinguished from Lempholemma by apothecia that develop from ascogonia produced in a tangle of generative hyphae rather than within pycnoascocarps, and from Synalissina by its bark-dwelling habit, asci of the Lichina type and the absence of hormocystangia. Although DNA sequence data place the genus close to Lichina within Lichinaceae, Paludolemma differs from that genus in having a crustose, granulose–areolate, bark-inhabiting thallus with open apothecia, whereas Lichina species are fruticose, predominantly saxicolous, and have punctiform fruiting bodies.

== Description ==
Paludolemma syreniarum forms a dark, bark-dwelling crust that becomes conspicuously gelatinous when wet. The thallus is ecorticate (lacks a cortex) and ranges from finely granular to irregularly areolate: tiny blackish-olive granules coalesce into uneven patches a few millimetres across that often lift slightly at the edges, producing a rough, broken surface on the tree base or root flare. The lichen is attached to the substrate by pale rhizohyphae, and it does not develop isidia, soralia or other obvious vegetative propagules.

Apothecia are usually numerous on well-developed thalli. They are small, sessile discs roughly 0.25–0.3 mm in diameter that begin as low, rounded bumps with a minute opening and later expand to expose a pale to light brown, flat disc. Each disc is bordered by a thin thalline margin that soon becomes inconspicuous as the surrounding thallus recedes, leaving from above the impression of an almost biatorine apothecium with a narrow, paler proper margin. The hymenium is colourless and relatively tall, staining blue in iodine solution, and contains distinct, mostly unbranched paraphyses. Asci are elongated, cylindrical to somewhat club-shaped, with thin walls and no strongly developed apical apparatus, and belong to the Lichina type recognised in the Lichinaceae.

Each ascus contains eight simple (non-septate) ascospores that are colourless and ellipsoid to broadly ellipsoid, typically about 12–16 micrometres (μm) long and 7–10 μm wide. The photobiont is a Nostoc-like cyanobacterium that forms dense clusters or tightly coiled chains of small cells embedded within the thallus, a character used to separate Paludolemma from superficially similar genera that host other cyanobiont types. No pycnidia or other asexual reproductive structures have been observed, and thin-layer chromatography has not detected any lichen secondary metabolites in the species.

== Habitat and distribution ==
Paludolemma syreniarum is a semi-aquatic, corticolous lichen that grows on the lower trunks and root flares of deciduous trees in swampy forests. It is characteristic of vernal pools and seasonally flooded woodland, where the bases of ash (Fraxinus) and other hardwoods stand in still water up to a few metres deep for much of the year. The lichen occupies the zone that is submerged during wet phases but exposed during late summer and autumn, forming black, areolate patches with numerous pale apothecia around the usual high-water line on the bark.

All confirmed records are from southern Ontario, Canada, where the species has been found in deciduous forests over calcareous bedrock such as such as marble and limestone, or over glacial till, within the Great Lakes–St. Lawrence region. Its habitat coincides with that of other amphibious cyanolichens, particularly Leptogium rivulare, and the authors of the original description suggested that P. syreniarum is probably more widespread than current collections indicate, but is easily overlooked because suitable trees are submerged or snow-covered for much of the year. Other corticolous "amphibious" lichens recorded with it in Ontario include Leptogium rivulare and Lecania cyrtella. Because similar habitats occur in the Great Lakes region of the United States, it is suspected to occur there as well.

Within the Lichinaceae, Paludolemma is one of only a few genera adapted to bark in wet lowland forests. The other currently known corticolous members of the family are Lecidopyrenopsis corticola, recorded from tropical and subtropical regions including Thailand, the Seychelles, Costa Rica and French Guiana, and Leprocollema novocaledonianum, which is known from New Caledonia. Comparable bark-inhabiting species also occur in the mainly saxicolous genus Peltula (family Phylliscaceae), but those lichens differ markedly from Paludolemma in both morphology and cyanobiont type.
