= Pycnolemma =

Scientific classification
- Kingdom: Fungi
- Division: Ascomycota
- Class: Lichinomycetes
- Order: Lichinales
- Family: Lichinaceae
- Genus: Pycnolemma; M.Schultz & M.Prieto (2024)
- Species: P. polycarpum

Binomial name
- Pycnolemma polycarpum (M.Schultz) M.Schultz & M.Prieto (2024)

Synonyms
- Lempholemma polycarpum M.Schultz (2005)

Single-species fungal genus

Pycnolemma is a fungal genus in the family Lichinaceae. It contains the single species Pycnolemma polycarpum, a rock-dwelling, gelatinous lichen. The genus was proposed in 2024 when molecular studies showed that the species did not belong in its former genus Lempholemma, but instead formed a distinct evolutionary lineage within the Lichinaceae. Pycnolemma polycarpum forms small, blackish rosettes on limestone rocks in tropical dry forests and is distinguished by pycnoascocarps, in which ascocarps develop from ascogonia beneath pycnidia. The species has a scattered distribution across tropical regions, having been recorded from Yemen, Oman, Madagascar, Aldabra, and Puerto Rico.

== Taxonomy ==
Pycnolemma was established by Matthias Schultz and María Prieto in 2024 to accommodate the species formerly known as Lempholemma polycarpum. The generic name refers to the production of pycnoascocarps (a characteristic type of ascocarp, or fruiting body) and to the morphological resemblance to Lempholemma, which also contains Nostoc cyanobionts. The species epithet alludes to the characteristically numerous fruiting bodies (ascocarps).

The genus was segregated from Lempholemma following phylogenetic studies that revealed the traditional concept of that genus to be polyphyletic. Pycnolemma and Peltolemma form a well-supported clade within the Lichinaceae, distinct from Lempholemma in the strict sense, which remains in the family Porocyphaceae.

== Description ==
Pycnolemma has an umbilicate to lobate, rosette-shaped thallus composed of radiating lobes. It resembles other peltate or rosette-forming lichens found in dry, rocky habitats, such as Anema, Lichinella, Paulia, Peltula, Peccania, and Thyrea, but is distinguished by its use of a Nostoc photobiont. The thallus is strictly homoiomerous, lacking a central hyphal strand, and becomes gelatinous when wet.

Thalli consist of individual, regular, umbilicate-lobate rosettes 3–6 mm across; lobes are radiating, free, tongue-shaped and convex, typically 1.5–2.5 mm long, 0.5–0.6 mm wide and 0.25–0.45 mm thick. The lobe surface is smooth but becomes verrucose when numerous small apothecia are produced. Microscopically, the mycobiont forms a loose network of elongated hyphae that becomes denser towards the lobe margins (cells 10–17.5 × 1.5–2(–5) μm). The photobiont is Nostoc, forming twisted, bead-like chains of 5–20 globose to ellipsoid cells (3–5 μm wide without sheath; 10–12.5 μm with sheath; sheath hyaline centrally and yellowish-brown towards the upper surface). Apothecia are usually abundant (1–10 per lobe) and very small, 200 (to 250) μm wide, immersed to semi-immersed with a low thalline margin and a punctiform disc that is reddish-black when dry and dark red when moist. Ascospores (eight per ascus) are simple, hyaline and broadly ellipsoid, c. 12.4 × 6.5 μm, with a wall that thickens with age to c. 1.5 μm.

Within Lempholemma s.l., species liable to be confused with P. polycarpum include Lempholemma socotranum (umbilicate-squamulose, larger apothecia, smaller spores), Lempholemma radiatum (ridged, plicate lobes with isidia and different ascoma ontogeny, more northern distribution), and Lempholemma lingulatum (unbranched tongue-shaped lobes widened apically); superficially similar Collema multipartitum and C. fragile differ in apothecial development and other micromorphological traits.

The apothecia in Pycnolemma develop as pycnoascocarps (ascocarps arising from ascogonia beneath pycnidia), a feature shared with some species formerly placed in Lempholemma. This structure differentiates Pycnolemma from morphologically similar genera such as Lingolemma, which has a central hyphal strand, and Peltolemma, which bears typical apothecia rather than pycnoascocarps.

== Habitat and distribution ==
Pycnolemma polycarpum occurs on inclined limestone boulders in relatively exposed habitats on rocky slopes with open forest vegetation. It is known from two localities in south-eastern Yemen: the type collection from Shah-ot, Damkaut (Al Mahrah Governorate; c. 680 m), and a second site west of Hawf near the Omani border (c. 750 m) on south-facing, c. 45°-inclined limestone boulders among Anogeissus dhofarica and Maytenus dhofarensis.

The species is found in association with other saxicolous lichens such as Paulia aldabrensis, Paulia perforata, Lempholemma botryosum, and Psorotichia species. It occupies semi-arid, subtropical environments that experience high insolation and moderate humidity from the monsoonal influence along the Arabian coast. Beyond Yemen, the species (and thus the genus) is also known from Oman, Aldabra, Madagascar, and Puerto Rico, indicating a disjunct, tropical distribution across both Afro-Indian Ocean and Caribbean regions.
