= Jenmania =

Scientific classification
- Domain: Eukaryota
- Kingdom: Fungi
- Division: Ascomycota
- Class: Lichinomycetes
- Order: Lichinales
- Family: Lichinaceae
- Genus: Jenmania; W. Wächt.

Type species
- Jenmania goebelii W. Wächt.

Genus of fungi

Jenmania is a genus of fungi within the family Lichinaceae. The genus contains two species.

The genus name of Jenmania is in honour of George Samuel Jenman (1845-1902), who was a British gardener and botanist.

The genus was circumscribed by Wilhelm Wächter in Flora vol.84 on page 349 in 1897.
