= Peltolemma =

Scientific classification
- Kingdom: Fungi
- Division: Ascomycota
- Class: Lichinomycetes
- Order: Lichinales
- Family: Lichinaceae
- Genus: Peltolemma; M.Schultz & M.Prieto (2024)
- Species: P. socotranum

Binomial name
- Peltolemma socotranum (M.Schultz) M.Schultz & M.Prieto (2024)
- Holotype: Socotra Island, Yemen

Synonyms
- Lempholemma socotranum M.Schultz (2003)

Single-species lichen genus

Peltolemma is a fungal genus in the family Lichinaceae. It comprises the single species Peltolemma socotranum, a cyanolichen. Originally described as Lempholemma socotranum in 2003, the species was reclassified into the genus Peltolemma based on its unique combination of structural features. It is known only from Socotra Island, Yemen, where it inhabits dry, exposed rock surfaces in karst limestone areas. The lichen's small scale-like form and Nostoc cyanobacterial partner distinguish it from similar rock-dwelling lichens in the region.

== Taxonomy ==
Peltolemma was established as a new genus by Matthias Schultz and María Prieto to accommodate the species now known as Peltolemma socotranum, which is both the type and only species. The species is based on material originally described as Lempholemma socotranum by Schultz in 2003. The type collection comes from Yemen, on Socotra Island, about 4.5 km south of Hadibu on the ascent to Muqadrihon Pass, where it was found growing on a large, shaded, karstic limestone boulder at an elevation of around 250 m.

The species was reclassified in Peltolemma when its distinct combination of characters became clear. The generic name refers to the morphology and symbiotic partnership of the lichen: the thallus has a small, scale-like, shield-shaped (peltate) form reminiscent of many species of Peltula, and its photosynthetic partner (photobiont) is a cyanobacterium of the genus Nostoc, as in Lempholemma.

== Description ==
Because Peltolemma is monospecific, the features of Peltolemma socotranum effectively describe the genus as a whole. It is a cyanolichen, meaning that its fungal partner lives in close association with a cyanobacterium (in this case Nostoc) that carries out photosynthesis. The vegetative body of the lichen (the thallus) is squamulose-peltate: it is made up of small, scale-like units (squamules) that are attached to the substrate near their centres so that the margins lift free, giving a tiny shield-like appearance. The squamules have margins that are only shortly incised, so the lobes are shallowly divided rather than being strongly dissected.

Internally, the thallus has a homoiomerous structure, with the fungal filaments and cyanobacterial cells more or less evenly mixed throughout the tissue. There is no central strand of more loosely arranged fungal hyphae running through the thallus, a feature that helps to distinguish the genus from some of its relatives. The reproductive structures are now understood to be typical apothecia: more or less rounded, open, spore-bearing discs, rather than the closed, pycnidium-like pycnoascocarps that occur in some other lichens. These apothecia are relatively large for such a small lichen and are edged by a conspicuous rim of thallus tissue, forming a distinct thalline margin.

=== Similar species ===
Within the family Lichinaceae, Peltolemma was diagnosed as resembling other squamulose lichens from dry, rocky habitats, such as species of Anema, Lichinella, Paulia, Peltula, Peccania and Thyrea. It is, however, set apart by the identity and details of its Nostoc cyanobionts and by its anatomical features. Compared with Lingolemma lingulatum, Peltolemma socotranum has larger disc-like fruiting bodies (apothecia) that are bordered by a clear rim of thallus tissue (a thalline margin), lobes whose margins are only shallowly cut rather than deeply divided, and a uniformly constructed (homoiomerous) thallus that lacks a central strand of fungal hyphae. It also differs from Pycnolemma polycarpum (found in Yemen) in producing ordinary apothecia instead of the specialised pycnoascocarps found in that genus, and again in having larger, thalline-margined apothecia and only shortly incised lobes.

== Habitat and distribution ==
Peltolemma socotranum is known only from Socotra Island in Yemen. In keeping with other squamulose lichens of the Lichinaceae, it occurs in dry, rocky habitats, growing as small patches of shield-like squamules on karstic limestone boulders and other rock surfaces.
