= Gudelia =

Scientific classification
- Kingdom: Fungi
- Division: Ascomycota
- Class: Lichinomycetes
- Order: Lichinales
- Family: Gloeoheppiaceae
- Genus: Gudelia; Henssen (1995)
- Species: G. mexicana

Binomial name
- Gudelia mexicana Henssen (1995)

Single-species lichen genus

Gudelia is a fungal genus in the family Gloeoheppiaceae. It comprises the single species Gudelia mexicana, a little-known rock-dwelling lichen found in southwest Mexico and described in 1995.

== Taxonomy ==
Both the genus Gudelia and its sole species were described in 1995 by the German lichenologist Aino Henssen. The type specimen of Gudelia mexicana was collected in Mexico, specifically from the state of Guerrero. It was found 18 km (11 mi) south-southeast of Taxco, at an elevation of 1,360 m (4,460 ft), growing on a limestone cliff by the roadside. The specimen was collected in June 1972 by T.P. Maslin. The genus name Gudelia was chosen by Henssen to honor the late Professor Gunnar Degelius, a renowned Swedish lichenologist.

Gudelia is distinguished from other genera in the Gloeoheppiaceae by its peltate thallus that is completely gelatinous internally. The thallus is homoiomerous, with hyphae embedded in a gelatinous matrix and arranged in a reticulate pattern. It lacks the interstices or cavities found in related genera like Gloeoheppia and Pseudopeltula.

While the thallus structure is unique, the apothecial development and spore characteristics align Gudelia with other members of the Gloeoheppiaceae. Within the family, Gudelia's position is somewhat isolated due to its distinctive thallus structure and consistency, but its apothecial characters correspond well with other members of the family.

== Description ==
Gudelia mexicana is a small, disc-shaped lichen that grows up to 9 mm (about 1/3 inch) in diameter. Its overall shape resembles a flattened mushroom cap with broad lobes around the edges. The lichen attaches to rock surfaces by a central stalk-like structure called an umbilicus, which is about 1 mm long and 1.5–3.2 mm wide. The upper surface of the lichen appears brownish, but this is mostly obscured by a thick, greyish-white powdery coating, the pruina, which gives the lichen a frosted appearance. The underside of the lichen also has this powdery coating, especially towards the edges, while the center area around the umbilicus is brownish and has a ridged texture.

When examined in cross-section, the lichen body (thallus) is quite thick, measuring 500–700 μm (0.5–0.7 mm). Unlike many lichens that have distinct layers, Gudelia mexicana has a uniform internal structure. Its fungal threads (hyphae) form an irregular network throughout a jelly-like substance, giving the lichen a gelatinous consistency when wet. The cells of its photosynthetic partner, a type of cyanobacteria, are scattered within this gel but are more concentrated near the surface.

The lichen reproduces sexually through small, disc-like structures called apothecia. These appear on the upper surface, reaching up to 1.2 mm in diameter. They have a brown center (the disc) surrounded by a raised rim (the margin) that matches the powdery appearance of the main lichen body. Inside the apothecia, spore-producing sacs (asci) typically contain eight spores each, though some may have as few as four. Gudelia mexicana also has structures for asexual reproduction called pycnidia. These are flask-shaped chambers embedded in the lichen body, producing tiny, rod-shaped reproductive cells called conidia.

== Habitat and distribution ==
Gudelia mexicana is a highly specialized lichen with a very limited known distribution, having been documented from only a single location in Mexico. The lichen's habitat preferences appear to be quite specific. It is saxicolous, meaning it grows on rock surfaces, with a particular affinity for calcareous substrates like limestone.
