= Cryptothele =

Cryptothele may refer to:

- Cryptothele (lichen), a genus of lichens
- Cryptothele (spider), a genus of spiders
