= George Samuel Jenman =

English botanist, gardener and photographer in Jamaica and Guyana (1845–1902)

George Samuel Jenman (1845–1902) was a British gardener and botanist. He specialized in growing and studying plants. He was superintendent of Castleton Botanical Garden, Jamaica from 1873 to 1879, and Government Botanist and superintendent of the Botanical Gardens in British Guiana (now Guyana) from 1879 to 1902. Jenman was also a member of the Linnean Society.

== Life ==
George Samuel Jenman was born in Plymouth in 1845. He trained in gardening and botany at Kew Gardens.

In 1873, Jenman moved to Jamaica where he was appointed as superintendent of Castleton Botanical Gardens. During this time he began his work on ferns of the Caribbean, which was his major contribution to the field of botany.

In 1879 Jenman moved to British Guiana where he was appointed as Government Botanist and Superintendent of the Botanical Gardens. Castellani House, now the home of Guyana's National Art Gallery, was originally designed and built to be his official residence by the Maltese colonial architect Cesar Castellani. Much of his work in British Guiana was focused on the Sugarcane industry. In 1881 he published the Handlist of Jamaican Ferns and in 1881 he began a series entitled The Ferns and Fern Allies of the British West Indies and Guiana (1898-1909) which was published by the Bulletin of the Royal Botanic Gardens in Trinidad. Jenman died before he was able to complete the series, but his work was continued - and the series completed - by his successor, Henry C. Hart.

The Curator's clock, and a dedicatory plaque, were installed at the Curator's Lodge in the Botanical Gardens of Guyana in memory of Jenman.

In 1897, botanist Wilhelm Wächter published Jenmania, which is a genus of fungi within the family Lichinaceae and named in George's honour.

== Publications ==
- A Handlist of Jamaican Ferns and their Allies. Baldwin and Company: Demerara, 1881
- The Ferns and Fern Allies of the British West Indies and Guiana. U. S. Government Printing Office, 1909.
