= Phloeopeccania =

Scientific classification
- Domain: Eukaryota
- Kingdom: Fungi
- Division: Ascomycota
- Class: Lichinomycetes
- Order: Lichinales
- Family: Lichinaceae
- Genus: Phloeopeccania; J. Steiner

Type species
- Phloeopeccania pulvinulina J.Steiner (1902)

Species
- P. anemoides P. australiensis P. hispanica P. pulvinulina

Genus of fungi

Phloeopeccania is a genus of fungi within the family Lichinaceae. It contains three species.
