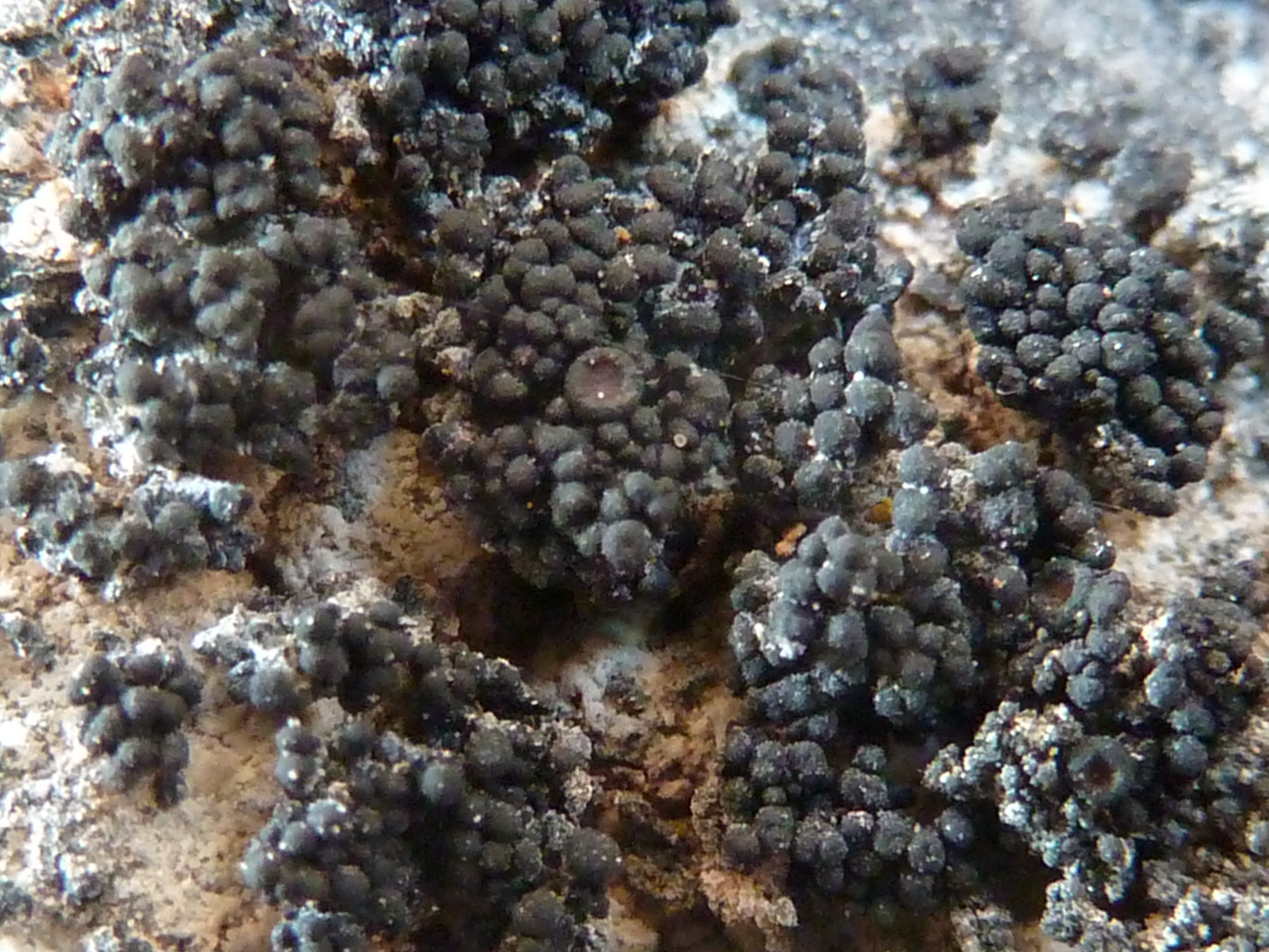
- Synalissa ramulosa

Scientific classification
- Domain: Eukaryota
- Kingdom: Fungi
- Division: Ascomycota
- Class: Lichinomycetes
- Order: Lichinales
- Family: Lichinaceae
- Genus: Synalissa; Fr. (1825)

Type species
- Synalissa ramulosa (Hoffm.) Fr. (1825)

Species
- S. fluviatilis S. intricata S. symphorea

= Synalissa (lichen) =

Genus of fungi

Synalissa is a small genus of lichen-forming fungi in the family Lichinaceae. These lichens form tiny, coral-like cushions with upright branches that appear black when dry but swell and turn jelly-like after rain. They reproduce through small disc-shaped structures at the branch tips and partner with blue-green algae rather than the green algae found in most other lichens.

== Taxonomy ==
The genus was circumscribed by Elias Magnus Fries in 1825. Fries distinguished Synalissa from Collema based on the obovate pseudoperithecia with punctiform (point-like) ostioles and the absence of sporidia, noting only rigid structures. The assigned type species was S. ramulosa, which had previously been classified under Collema by Hoffmann (C. ramulosum), Floerke (C. symphoreum), and Acharius (C. synalissium). Fries observed that many specimens of lichen that had been kept moist for extended periods developed a very rigid, carbonaceous structure, and noted that the genus also occurs parasitically on Lecidea lurida.

== Description ==
Synalissa grows as a tiny, shrub-like cushion composed of many upright, coral-shaped branches. When the thallus (lichen body) is dry it appears black, but after rain the branches swell, turn dark red-brown and feel jelly-like because the lichen lacks a protective outer skin (cortex). Under the microscope the fungal threads (hyphae) form an angular, box-like lattice that encloses clusters of its cyanobacterial partner, Gloeocapsa. Near each branch tip the algal cells are plentiful, but towards the base a pale core of hyphae is empty of algae, giving the branch a hollow look in section.

The reproductive structures sit at the ends of the branches. They begin as almost spherical apothecia wrapped in a rim of thallus tissue (a thallin margin); only a tiny pore is visible at first, but the disc gradually widens as the fruit body matures. Inside, thin supporting filaments (paraphyses) separate the spore sacs (asci). The asci are slender cylinders with thin walls, do not give an amyloid (blue) staining reaction to iodine, and usually hold more than the standard eight ascospores. Each spore is single-celled, broadly ellipsoid to nearly round, and remains colourless. Asexual reproduction takes place in minute flask-shaped pycnidia that are likewise terminal on the branches; these release rod-shaped, colourless conidia. No secondary metabolites have been detected by thin-layer chromatography, so recognition of the genus rests on its jelly-swollen, coral-like tufts and terminal "pore-disc" apothecia.

== Species ==
- Synalissa fluviatilis H.Harada (2018) – Japan
- Synalissa intricata (Arnold) Nyl. (1883)
- Synalissa symphorea (Ach.) Nyl. (1857)
