= Leprocollema =

Scientific classification
- Domain: Eukaryota
- Kingdom: Fungi
- Division: Ascomycota
- Class: Lichinomycetes
- Order: Lichinales
- Family: Lichinaceae
- Genus: Leprocollema; Vain.
- Species: L. americanum

Binomial name
- Leprocollema americanum Vain. (1890)

Genus of fungi

Leprocollema is a genus of fungi in the family Lichinaceae. It was circumscribed in 1890 by lichenologist Edvard August Vainio. The genus is monotypic, containing only the single species Leprocollema americanum.
