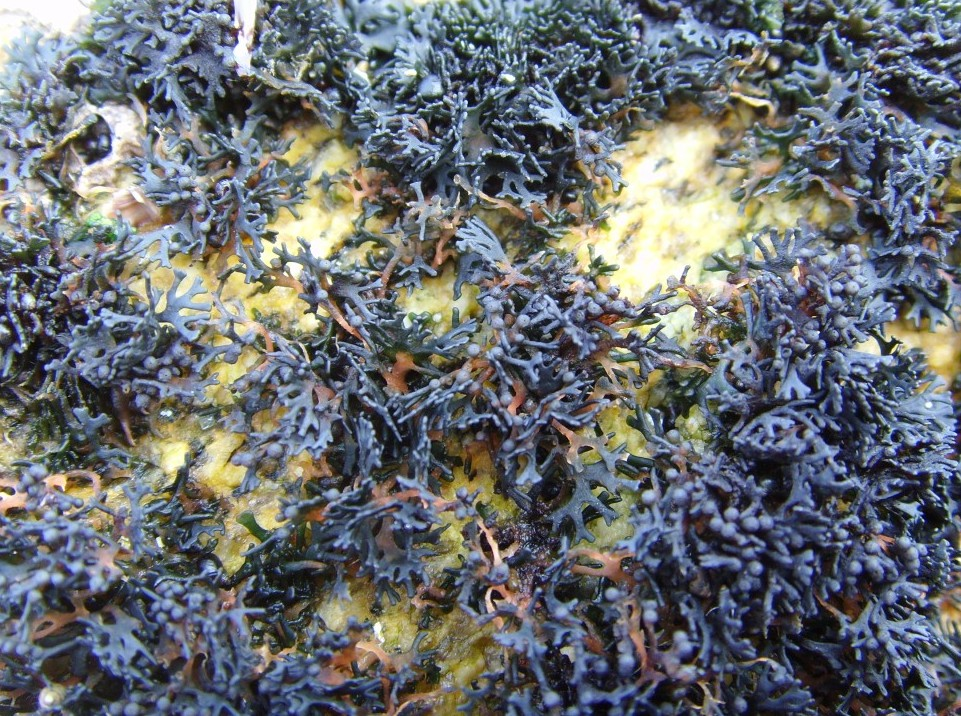

Scientific classification
- Kingdom: Fungi
- Division: Ascomycota
- Class: Lichinomycetes
- Order: Lichinales
- Family: Lichinaceae
- Genus: Lichina
- Species: L. pygmaea

Binomial name
- Lichina pygmaea (Lightf.) C.Agardh (1817)

Synonyms
- Fucus pygmaeus Lightf. (1777); Lichina pygmaea var. pygmaea (Lightf.) C.Agardh (1817); Pygmaea pumila Kuntze (1891)

= Lichina pygmaea =

Species of lichen-forming fungus

Lichina pygmaea is a species of lichen-forming fungus in the family Lichinaceae. This cyanolichen forms small, dark brown-black shrubby tufts up to about 1 cm tall, with flattened, with flattened, hand-like branching that becomes soft and jelly-like when wet. The species grows on rocky shores in the intertidal zone, especially on steep or vertical surfaces exposed to regular tidal washing, and is common on exposed Atlantic coastlines from western and north-western Europe to north-western Africa. In Britain and Ireland it typically occupies a distinct band between the black tar-lichen (Hydropunctaria maura) zone above and the barnacle–limpet (Patella vulgata) zone below. First described in 1777 by John Lightfoot as a small seaweed, it was transferred to Lichina by Carl Adolph Agardh in 1817 and is now recognized as a lichen. The genus contains four species; molecular studies indicate that the wide gaps in its distribution resulted from long-distance dispersal across oceanic barriers rather than from continental breakup.

The main photobiont is a cyanobacterium belonging to Rivularia, though DNA sequencing work has shown that the lichen body can host additional cyanobacteria and green algal partners, leading some researchers to characterize it as a small microbial ecosystem rather than a simple two-part symbiosis. Ecophysiological studies have found that L. pygmaea produces the sugar alcohol compound mannosidomannitol as a rapidly reversible osmotic regulator, helping it cope the changing salt concentrations of the intertidal zone, and that it can maintain photosynthesis both above and below the water surface. The tufted thalli shelter a small associated fauna of bivalves, snails, and isopods. No standard lichen substances have been detected by routine chemical screening, but targeted chemical analyses have yielded several unusual compounds, including mycosporine serinol, pygmeine, and the phenylurea compounds pygmaniline A and B. Recovery after disturbance is very slow; experimentally cleared patches showed no recolonization after 24 years, and populations of the lichen were severely damaged by the 1967 Torrey Canyon oil spill.

== Taxonomy ==
The species was first described by the English parson-naturalist John Lightfoot in 1777 as Fucus pygmaeus in Flora Scotica, having been interpreted at the time as a small marine alga rather than as a lichen. Lightfoot gave it the English name "pigmy Fucus". He reported it from the Little Isles of Jura and also noted it from Iona, the Firth of Forth, and other Scottish shores. The current combination in Lichina was later published by Carl Adolph Agardh in 1817, when he treated the species as Lichina pygmaea and described it as having a shrubby, lichen-like habit, while noting that its systematic position and natural habitat seemed to place it ambiguously between the fucoid algae and the lichens. The species is now treated as a lichen-forming fungus rather than a seaweed, and is the type species of genus Lichina. Chemical and molecular studies have supported the isolated position of Lichina within the class Lichinomycetes.

== Phylogenetics ==
Molecular studies place L. pygmaea in the class Lichinomycetes, an independent lichenized lineage within the Ascomycota, composed entirely of cyanolichens. A broad multilocus analysis of Lichinomycetes published in 2024 found that much of the traditional morphology-based classification in the class was inconsistent with phylogeny, and proposed a revised classification with four families, including an emended Lichinaceae. In that revision, Lichina was redefined more narrowly and restricted to marine species with ordinary apothecial development rather than pycnoascocarps. Several non-marine species formerly placed in the genus were transferred to Porocyphus, to which they proved more closely related.

The genus as currently circumscribed contains four species: L. pygmaea, L. confinis, L. canariensis, and the Southern Hemisphere L. intermedia. An earlier ITS and mtSSU study had already recovered the marine Lichina group as three strongly supported lineages corresponding to L. pygmaea, L. confinis, and the austral taxon now treated as L. intermedia, with L. pygmaea and L. confinis forming a sister pair. A four-locus study published in 2023 recovered the same four species and found that the three Northern Hemisphere species were each well delimited as distinct lineages, whereas L. intermedia showed much deeper internal genetic structure. The major disjunctions within the genus were found to be too recent to be explained by continental breakup, pointing instead to long-distance dispersal across oceanic barriers followed by speciation.

Studies of the cyanobacterial partner suggested that L. pygmaea associates with specific lineages of Rivularia, and that divergence times of the fungal and cyanobacterial partners were asynchronous, arguing against a simple pattern of strict co-divergence between the two symbionts.

In 2026, the genome of L. pygmaea was sequenced, yielding a 32.42 Mb haploid assembly scaffolded into seven chromosome-scale sequences (pseudomolecules), together with a mitochondrial genome and associated metagenomic data. That genome provides a resource for future phylogenomic work on marine lichens and on the evolution of Lichinomycetes more broadly.

== Description ==
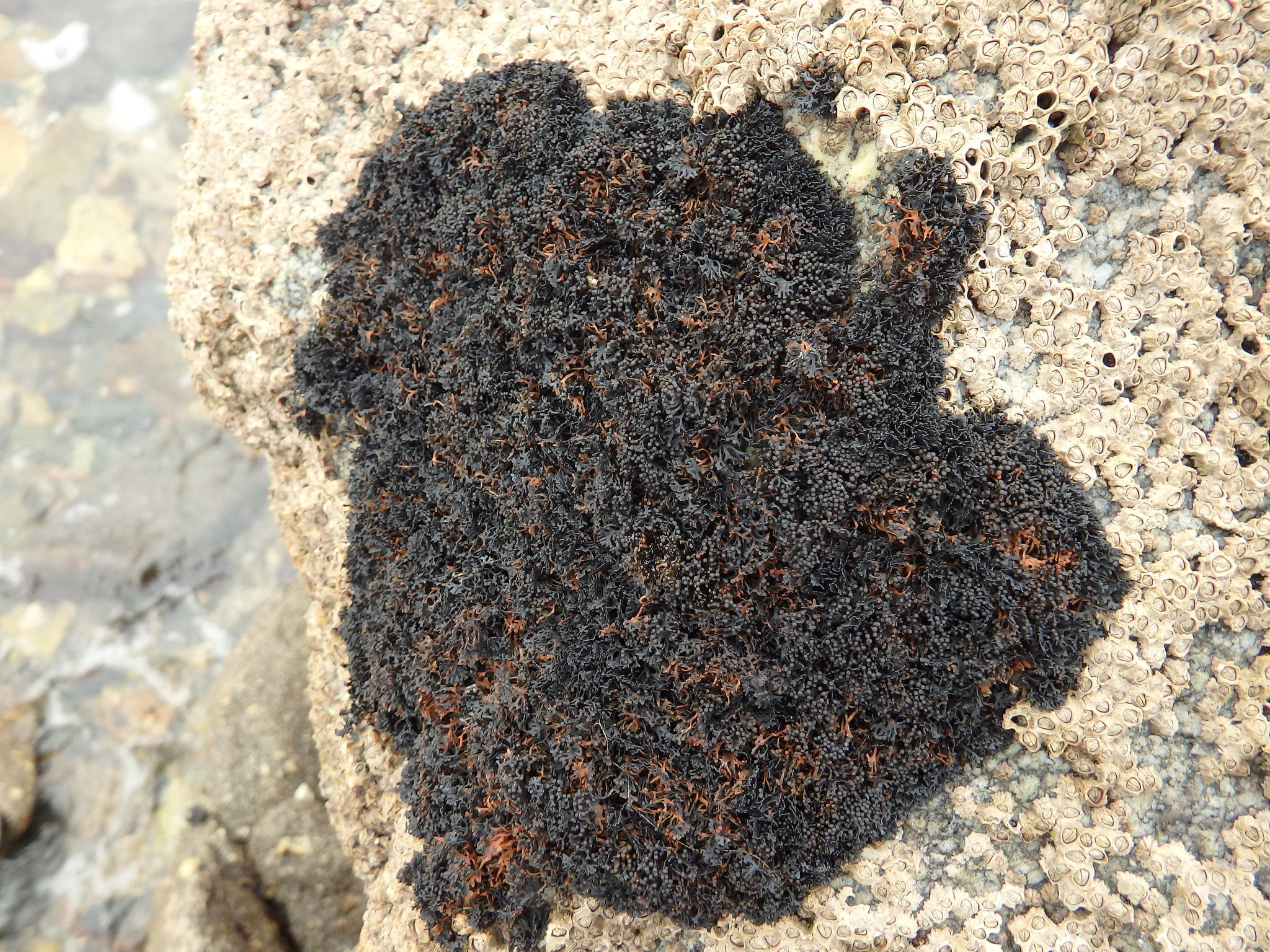
Lichina pygmaea growing on a rock in France

Lichina pygmaea is a small shrubby marine lichen that forms loose tufts, sometimes spreading into extensive mat-like patches, with thalli up to about 1 cm long. Its branches are flattened and usually divided in a hand-like (palmate) pattern, up to about 2 mm thick, though the tips may become more rounded. The thallus is dark brown-black to black and shiny, and when wet becomes gelatinous and rubbery; Lightfoot noted that it appears dark green when held to the light. The cortex is well developed and made of several layers of rectangular cells, while the cyanobacterial cells are mainly concentrated beneath it in the medulla and subcortical layers.

The apothecia (fruiting bodies) are roughly spherical, borne at the branch tips, and usually pore-like, reaching about 2 mm in diameter, and the ascospores are colourless, single-celled (aseptate), and 22–29 × 11–16 micrometres. Compared with the related L. confinis, it is typically larger, with distinctly flattened, repeatedly forking to palmately divided branches rather than cylindrical ones, and a more clearly developed cortex.

== Chemistry ==
No standard lichen products have been detected in the species by thin-layer chromatography. Early chemical work reported mannitol from L. pygmaea in 1963, isolated with an estimated yield of about 3.5%; other unidentified soluble compounds were also noted in the extracts, including a possible second polyalcohol, possibly volemitol.

Roullier and co-workers isolated mycosporine serinol and a glutamic acid derivative from methanolic extracts of L. pygmaea, describing both compounds as first reports from a lichen. They also concluded that the mycosporine in their material was mycosporine serinol rather than mycosporine-glycine, noting that the two compounds can be difficult to distinguish in routine chromatographic analyses. A broader metabolite screen confirmed the presence of mycosporine serinol alongside 5-oxoproline and mannitol, and detected signals interpreted as possible unknown compounds. Mycosporine serinol has been discussed as a compound that may help the lichen cope with dehydration during its repeated cycles of immersion and drying.

A later study by the same group isolated pygmeine, a previously unknown aryl-hydrazide derivative of L-glutamic acid, from methanolic extracts. The same study also recovered mycosporine serinol and L-glutamic acid 5-[(2,4-dimethoxyphenyl)-hydrazide] from the lichen. Further chemical study of an Irish specimen yielded five new resorcinol derivatives, including the phenylurea compounds pygmaniline A and pygmaniline B, together with several additional compounds such as L-pyroglutamic acid methyl ester, isoaucuparin, and ergosterol peroxide.

A distinctive cell wall sugar polymer, an alkali- and water-soluble galactomannan, has also been isolated from L. pygmaea; its structure was used as chemical evidence supporting the recognition of Lichinomycetes as a separate class of lichen-forming fungi. Volatile extracts from Moroccan material were reported to be dominated by sesquiterpenes, especially himachalene derivatives.

== Habitat and distribution ==
Lichina pygmaea grows on maritime rock in the intertidal zone, especially on steep or vertical surfaces that are regularly washed by the tide. It is most frequent on sunny rock faces and may also occur on less steeply sloping shores where aspect and moisture conditions are favourable. The species is common on exposed and very exposed shores, occurs more sparsely on semi-exposed and fairly sheltered coasts, and is generally absent from sheltered shores where competition from fucoid algae becomes greater. In Britain and Ireland it typically forms a distinct band between the Hydropunctaria maura zone above and the barnacle–Patella vulgata zone below, often growing among barnacles, although its exact position varies regionally with shore exposure and steepness. In microbiome surveys from Brittany, L. pygmaea was treated as a lower-eulittoral species immersed for several hours each day, in contrast to L. confinis, which occupies the upper eulittoral and is usually exposed mainly to splashing and sea spray.

The species is widespread on Atlantic coastlines, with a range extending from western and north-western Europe to north-western Africa; it is especially abundant on European coasts of the North Atlantic, including Britain and Ireland. Because Canary Islands material once identified as L. pygmaea has been shown to include L. canariensis, older records of L. pygmaea from that region require reassessment.

== Ecology ==
Lichina pygmaea is a characteristic species of the maritime black-zone and upper-eulittoral fringe on rocky shores. In a quantitative study of rocky shores on Anglesey, Anthony Fletcher found it to be the only littoral lichen in the survey that required regular tidal submersion, and interpreted it as a light-demanding species of sunny shores that was absent from sheltered coasts and could also disappear from very exposed ones. He suggested that sheltered conditions may be too wet for the species, while its loss from very exposed shores may reflect excess water and physical erosion from wave action. Field observations at Wembury suggested that growth is favoured where some moisture is retained between tides, while drier patches above normal high-water levels can remain almost unchanged for many years.

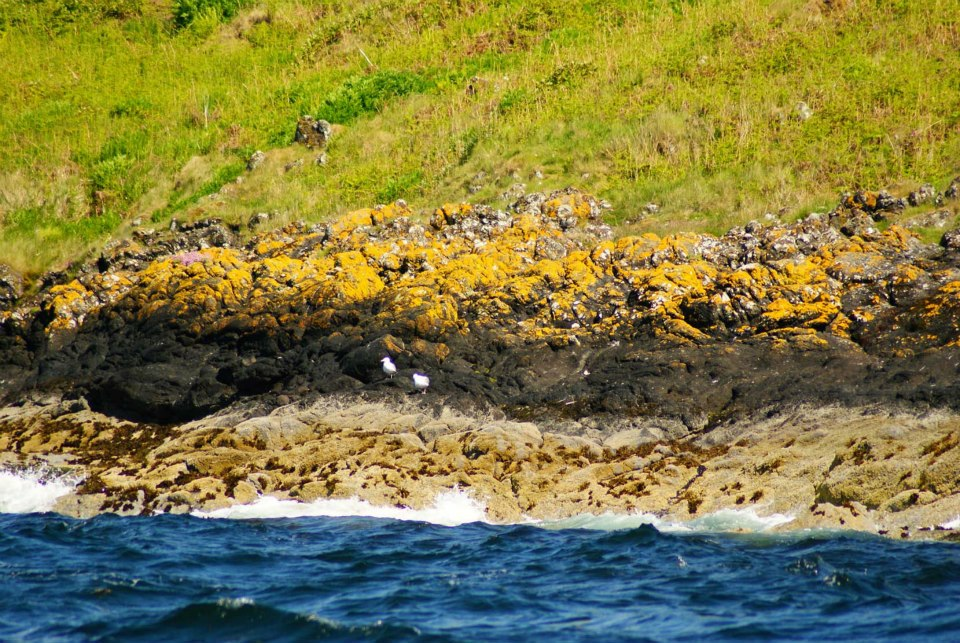
Intertidal zonation of lichens on coastal rocks on the island of Great Cumbrae, Scotland; the black belt indicates the littoral zone

The tufted thalli create shelter for a small associated fauna, including the bivalve Lasaea adansoni and littorinid snails such as Littorina saxatilis and Melarhaphe neritoides; in south-western Britain, Gibbula umbilicalis may also occur among the tufts. Long-established patches may overgrow and eventually exclude barnacles from parts of the rock surface. On rocky shores of northern Spain, extensive patches of L. pygmaea were found to harbour intertidal isopods in occasionally high densities; among the species collected in the lichen belt was Campecopea hirsuta.

Ecophysiological experiments by Guido Benno Feige showed that L. pygmaea synthesizes the heteroside compound mannosidomannitol, a sugar alcohol whose production increased with seawater concentration. This compound acts as an osmotic regulator, helping the lichen cope with changing salinity in the intertidal zone. The response proved rapidly reversible: mannosidomannitol broke down when thalli were transferred from seawater to distilled water, was resynthesized within about 20 minutes after renewed salt stress, and could be built up and degraded repeatedly in alternating media. Feige therefore suggested that natural desalting of the thallus by rainfall would probably not damage the lichen. Further experiments showed that photosynthetic carbon fixation was greatest when the thallus had access to atmospheric carbon dioxide, and lower under seawater and desalinated conditions. The same study found that osmotic stress promoted the synthesis and accumulation of mannosidomannitol, while osmotic relief led to its breakdown, confirming its role in reversible osmoregulation. Feige also concluded that glucose is transferred from the photobiont to the fungal partner, and that the amount released rose with increasing photosynthetic carbon fixation and bicarbonate supply.

Additional physiological work has shown that the lichen can maintain substantial photosynthesis both when exposed above the water surface and when submerged, and that it can use bicarbonate as an inorganic carbon source in seawater. Stable-carbon-isotope comparisons among co-occurring littoral lichens found that L. pygmaea had relatively high δ¹³C values, consistent with an active carbon-concentrating mechanism, while its near-zero to slightly positive δ¹⁵N values were interpreted as compatible with nitrogen fixation by its cyanobacterial partner. Comparative studies of desiccation stress found that L. pygmaea was relatively tolerant of drying and rewetting: after desiccation it lost less intracellular potassium than more moisture-dependent lichens, while calcium and magnesium levels were little affected. This tolerance is consistent with the species' intertidal habit, in which the thallus is regularly exposed to the atmosphere between periods of immersion.

The main cyanobacterial photobiont is now known to belong to Rivularia, not Calothrix as was often assumed in older literature. An ultrastructural study of the mycobiont found tubule-rich "mesosome-like" structures in fungal cells, especially near the algal layer, together with glycogen-containing reserve material; these structures may be involved in the uptake and processing of carbohydrates moving from the photobiont to the fungal partner. A follow-up electron-microscopy study reported numerous vesicles in the fibrillar sheath surrounding the photobiont, together with deep invaginations in adjacent fungal hyphae, and interpreted these as possible sites of metabolite transfer between the symbiotic partners. Recent sequencing studies indicate that the thallus can also host additional cyanobacteria and green algal partners, and that carbon exchange within the symbiosis shifts with the tidal cycle, with photobiont-derived sugars and osmolytes likely contributing to fungal nutrition. A 2024 commentary on this transcriptomic work suggested that L. pygmaea may cope with the rapidly fluctuating conditions of the intertidal zone partly by hosting multiple photosynthetic partners within a single thallus, supporting a view of the lichen as a small microbial ecosystem rather than a simple two-part symbiosis.

Culture-based studies have also recovered non-photosynthetic bacteria from L. pygmaea. One alphaproteobacterial isolate, strain MOLA1416, was interpreted as a probably undescribed member of the Rhizobiales, and chemical profiling showed that the associated bacterial community includes metabolically active heterotrophs as well as the main photosynthetic partners. Further culture-based work recovered several Streptomyces isolates from the lichen; although these had identical SSU rRNA gene sequences to related isolates from other coastal lichens, comparison of their physical traits, broader genomic features, and secondary metabolites showed that they represented distinct strains within the lichen's actinobacterial community. Culture-independent 16S rRNA sequencing showed that the bacterial community associated with L. pygmaea is distinct from both nearby seawater and the neighbouring upper-shore species L. confinis. The marine Lichina lichens were dominated by Bacteroidetes, and their associated bacteria were interpreted as reflecting adaptation to the exposed, highly variable conditions of the littoral zone.

Recovery after disturbance appears to be very slow: experimentally cleared patches showed no recolonization after 24 years, and some cleared areas were instead occupied by green algae, barnacles, and later Fucus spiralis. Field observations after the 1967 Torrey Canyon oil spill recorded L. pygmaea as one of the species most severely damaged on polluted Cornish and Breton coasts, with midlittoral populations in some places smothered under oil layers up to 2 cm thick; mortality was attributed chiefly to the blocking of light and air rather than to strong direct toxicity of the weathered oil itself. Experimental work showed that the oil-spill emulsifier BP 1002 sharply reduced photosynthetic carbon fixation and increased leakage of labelled compounds from the thallus, with the main toxic effect attributed to the surfactant fraction rather than to the solvent alone. Exposure to the emulsifier caused loss of photosynthetic pigments, especially under treatment with Surfactant B, which was interpreted as evidence of increased membrane permeability and cellular damage.
