= Digitothyrea =

Scientific classification
- Domain: Eukaryota
- Kingdom: Fungi
- Division: Ascomycota
- Class: Lichinomycetes
- Order: Lichinales
- Family: Lichinaceae
- Genus: Digitothyrea; P.P. Moreno & Egea

Type species
- Digitothyrea rotundata (Büdel, Henssen & Wessels) P.P. Moreno & Egea

Genus of fungi

Digitothyrea is a genus of fungi within the family Lichinaceae. The genus contains three species.
