= Phylliscidium =

Scientific classification
- Domain: Eukaryota
- Kingdom: Fungi
- Division: Ascomycota
- Class: Lichinomycetes
- Order: Lichinales
- Family: Lichinaceae
- Genus: Phylliscidium
- Species: P. monophyllum

Binomial name
- Phylliscidium monophyllum (Kremp.) Forssell

Genus of fungi

Phylliscidium is a genus of lichenized fungi in the family Lichinaceae. It is monotypic, containing the single species Phylliscidium monophyllum.
