= Pseudarctomia =

Scientific classification
- Domain: Eukaryota
- Kingdom: Fungi
- Division: Ascomycota
- Class: Lichinomycetes
- Order: Lichinales
- Family: Lichinaceae
- Genus: Pseudarctomia; Gyeln.

Type species
- Pseudarctomia microleuca (Nyl.) Gyeln.

Genus of fungi

Pseudarctomia is a genus of fungi within the family Lichinaceae. This is a monotypic genus, containing the single species Pseudarctomia microleuca.
