= Pseudopaulia =

Scientific classification
- Domain: Eukaryota
- Kingdom: Fungi
- Division: Ascomycota
- Class: Lichinomycetes
- Order: Lichinales
- Family: Lichinaceae
- Genus: Pseudopaulia; M. Schultz

Type species
- Pseudopaulia tessellata M. Schultz

Genus of fungi

Pseudopaulia is a genus of lichenized fungi within the family Lichinaceae. This is a monotypic genus, containing the single species Pseudopaulia tessellata.
