= Paulia =

Paulia may refer to:

- Paulia (starfish), a genus of starfishes in the family Asterodiscididae
- Paulia (fungus), a genus of fungi
