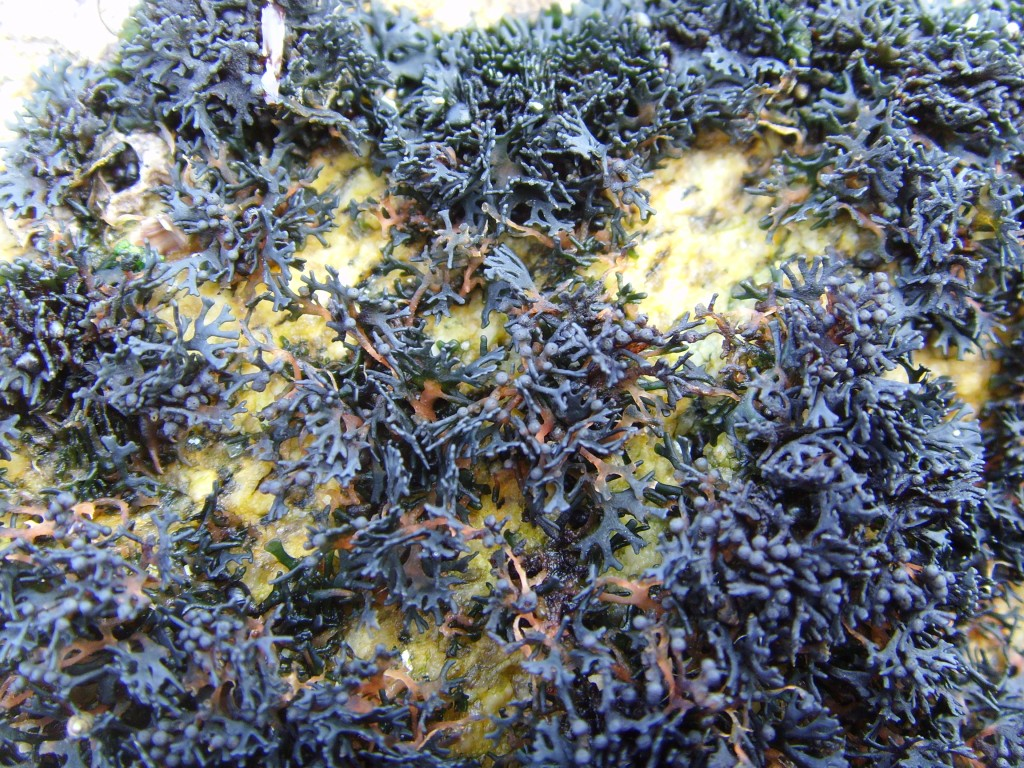
- Lichina pygmaea

Scientific classification
- Kingdom: Fungi
- Division: Ascomycota
- Class: Lichinomycetes
- Order: Lichinales
- Family: Lichinaceae; Nyl. (1854)

Type genus
- Lichina C.Agardh (1817)

Genera
- See text

Synonyms
- Gloeoheppiaceae Henssen (1995); Psorotichiaceae Körb. (1865) nom. inval.

= Lichinaceae =

Family of lichen-forming fungi

The Lichinaceae are a family of ascomycete fungi in the order Lichinales. Most species are lichenized with cyanobacteria, and have a distribution largely in temperate regions. In a 2024 molecular phylogenetics-informed revision, the circumscription of Lichinaceae was narrowed and the class Lichinomycetes was re‑structured into four families (three emended and one new), with many genera moved to Porocyphaceae, Phylliscaceae, or the newly erected Lichinellaceae. The family contain about 125 species in roughly 25 genera.

== Taxonomy ==
The family was circumscribed in 1854 by Finnish lichenologist William Nylander. His description of the family mentioned the obscure brown thallus resembling algae, with an overall morphology described as either filamentous or tufted (fruticose). The fruiting structures, the apothecia, are described as either endocarpous or biatorine. He included two tribes in the Lichinaceae: Ephebeae, which contained the genera Ephebe and Gonionema, and Lichineae, which contained Lichina, the type genus.

In 1986, Aino Henssen and Burkhard Büdel proposed the order Lichinales to contain the Lichinaceae. In the 1980s and 1990s, several taxonomic and nomenclatural studies were the basis for the revision of many of the species in the family.

Heppiaceae was a family proposed by Alexander Zahlbruckner in 1906 to contain the genus Heppia. It was considered to differ from the Peltulaceae in the polysporous asci, the rostrate type of ascus (i.e., having a beaklike process), the type of photobiont, and the thallus anatomy. Heppiaceae was typically included in the order Lecanorales, while the Peltulaceae was included in the Lichinales. Molecular phylogenetic methods showed that the genus Heppia forms a clade nested within the Lichinaceae, and so Heppiaceae was synonymized with Lichinaceae in 2003. Heppiaceae is now treated as a synonym of Porocyphaceae; Heppia is placed in Porocyphaceae in the 2024 classification. In 2024, Heppia is placed in Porocyphaceae, and Heppiaceae is treated as a synonym under that family concept. Gloeoheppiaceae was established by Aino Henssen (1995) for Gloeoheppia, Pseudopeltula, and Gudelia based on apothecial development and thallus traits; the 2024 multilocus revision places these genera inside Lichinaceae, and treats Gloeoheppiaceae as a synonym.

First informally proposed by Antonín Vězda in 1974, then formally published in 1984 by Josef Hafellner, the family Harpidiaceae contains the genera Harpidium and Euopsis. Although some authoritative sources have folded the Harpidiaceae into the Lichinaceae, some other authorities have preferred to treat the Harpidiaceae as a distinct, independent family. For example, in the Outline of the Ascomycota, the genera were included in the Lichinaceae. In a corrected and amended version of the "2016 classification of lichenized fungi in the Ascomycota and Basidiomycota", the Harpidiaceae was added as Pezizomycotina incertae sedis, a placement followed by recent (2022) review of fungal classification. Under the 2024 framework, Harpidiaceae (Harpidium, Euopsis) is not part of Lichinomycetes and remains outside Lichinaceae.

Multilocus molecular phylogenetics analyses resolve Lichinomycetes as sister to Coniocybomycetes. Within Lichinomycetes, Lichinaceae in the strict sense forms the Lichina clade, while Porocyphaceae and Phylliscaceae house most groups previously in the broad Lichinaceae; Lichinellaceae is newly described for thallinocarp‑forming lineages (Lichinella and allies). Character evolution supports typical apothecia (not thallinocarps) in Lichinaceae and emphasises ascus type and ascoma ontogeny as primary diagnostics.

== Description ==
The thalli of Lichinaceae species are known to occur in a variety of forms, including gelatinous, crustose, peltate, filamentous to microfoliose or microfruticose, ecorticate (lacking a cortex) and homoiomerous or stratified and very rarely eucorticate (i.e., comprising well-differentiated hyphae). The photobiont partner for the majority of species is cyanobacterial. Ascomata are typical apothecia; pycnoascocarps are rare and thallinocarps are absent in Lichinaceae (these "thallinocarps" typify Lichinellaceae). The hamathecium (the hyphae or other tissues between the asci) consist of unbranched to branched paraphyses, amyloid or non-amyloid. Asci are either prototunicate or unitunicate, and either amyloid or non-amyloid. Ascospores are simple, spherical to ellipsoid in shape, hyaline, and non-amyloid. The conidiomata are in the form of pycnidia. The conidia are non-septate, ellipsoid or bacilliform, rarely globose or filiform to sigmoid, and hyaline. No lichen products are made. Most species in the family are saxicolous (rock-dwelling) or terrestrial, while some species are corticolous (bark-dwelling).

Many species in the Gloeoheppia–Pseudopeltula–Gudelia group are terricolous or saxicolous on calcareous substrates in dry subtropical to Mediterranean climates; photobionts are usually chroococcoid cyanobacteria in yellow-brown gelatinous sheaths.

== Genera ==
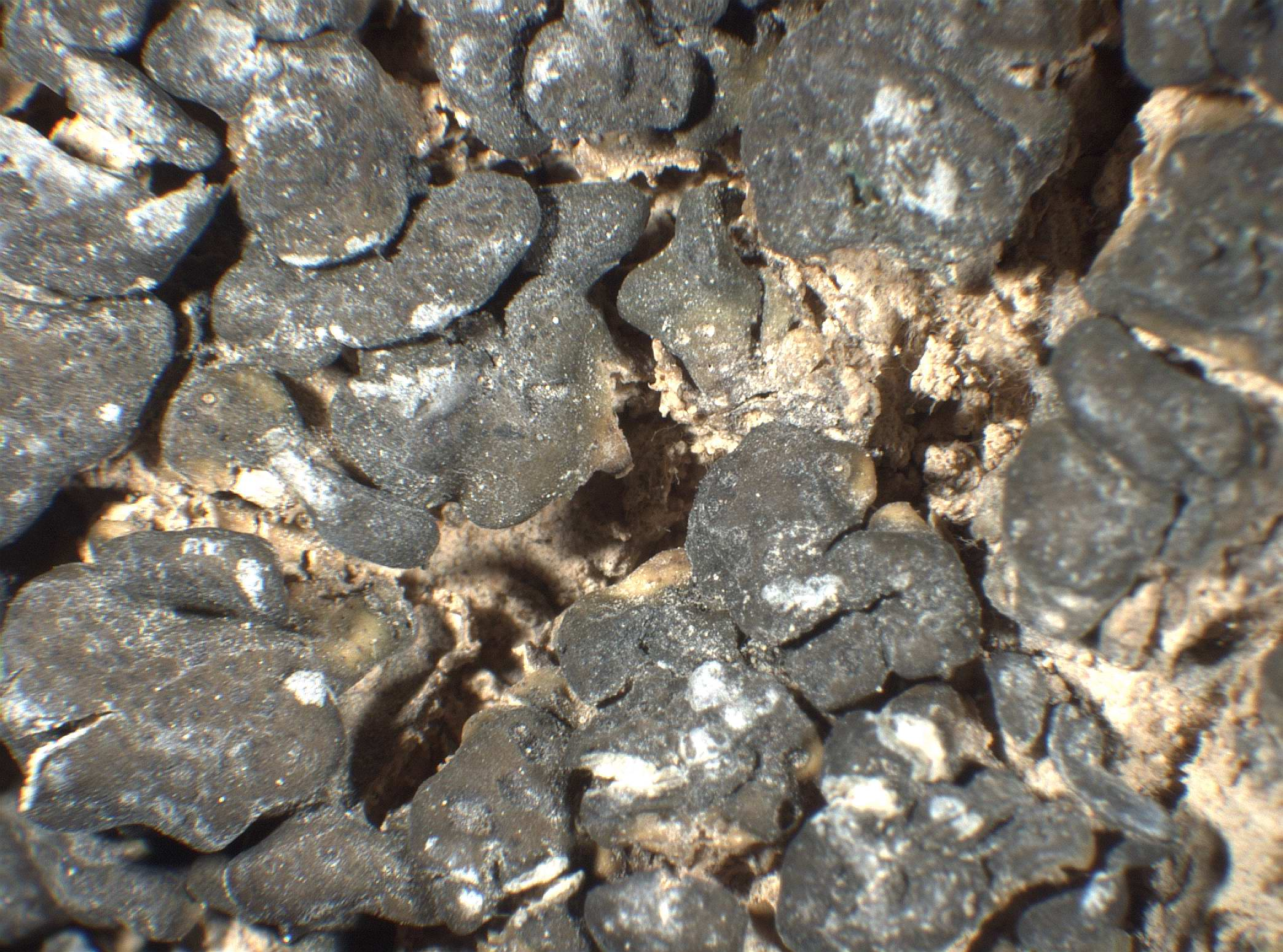
Gloeoheppia turgida

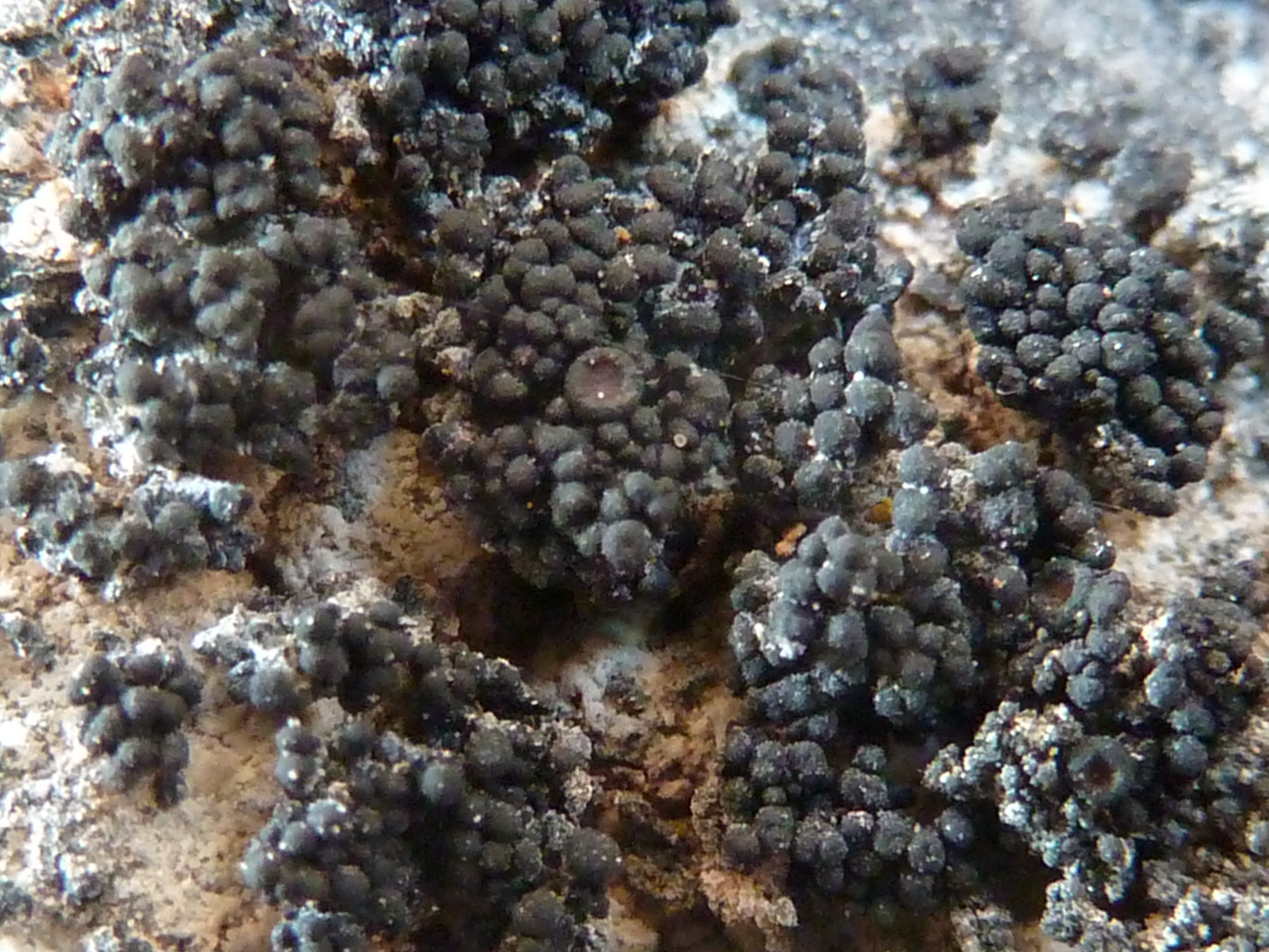
Synalissa ramulosa

In the 2024 framework, about 125 Lichinaceae species are distributed among these genera:

- Anema Nyl. ex Forssell (1885) – 21 spp.
- Collemopsis Nyl. ex Crombie (1874) – 1 sp.
- Digitothyrea P.P.Moreno & Egea (1992) – 3 spp.
- Forssellia Zahlbr. (1906) – 2 spp.
- Gloeoheppia Gyeln. (1935) – 5 spp.
- Gudelia Henssen (1995) – 1 sp.
- Jenmania W.Wächt. (1897) – 1 sp.
- Lemmopsis (Vain.) Zahlbr. (1906) – 3 spp.
- Leprocollema Vain. (1890) – 3 spp.
- Lichina C.Agardh (1817) – 4 spp.
- Lingolemma M.Schultz & M.Prieto (2024) – 1 sp.
- Metamelanea Henssen (1989) – 3 spp.
- Paludolemma M.Schultz & M.Prieto (2024) – 1 sp.
- Paulia Fée (1836) – 10 spp.
- Peltolemma M.Schultz & M.Prieto (2024) – 1 sp.
- Phloeopeccania J.Steiner (1902) – 4 spp.
- Pseudopaulia M.Schultz (2002) – 1 sp.
- Pseudopeltula Henssen (1995) – 5 spp.
- Pseudotichia M.Schultz & M.Prieto (2024) – 1 sp.
- Psorotichia A.Massal. (1855) – 50 spp.
- Pterygiopsis Vain. (1890) – 17 spp.
- Pycnolemma M.Schultz & M.Prieto (2024) – 1 sp.
- Pyrenocarpon Trevis. (1855) – 1 sp.
- Synalissa Fr. (1825) – 30 spp.
- Thelignya A.Massal. (1855) – 4 spp.
- Zahlbrucknerella Herre (1912) – 10 spp.

The genus Lichinodium, formerly placed in Lichinaceae, was placed in its own family (Lichinodiaceae) and order (Lichinodiales) in the class Leotiomycetes.

Genera that were formerly placed here, but are now classified in the Porocyphaceae: Calotrichopsis; Cladopsis; Ephebe; Heppia, Lapismalleus, Lempholemma, Porocyphus, Pyrenopsis, Paracyphus, Thermutis, Thyrea, Tichocyphus, and Watsoniomyces. Genera that were formerly placed here; now in Phylliscaceae: Allopyrenis; Cryptothele, Peccania; Peltula; Phylliscidium; Phyllisciella; and Phylliscum. Genera that were formerly placed here; now in Lichinellaceae: Lichinella (including Gonohymenia, Rechingeria, Thallinocarpon), Gonotichia, Synalissina, Edwardiella.

The proper classification of some poorly-known genera remains unresolved are not treated or not recovered under Lichinaceae in the 2024 framework and not reassigned; they are retained in this family provisionally until a more appropriate placement is determined:

- Mawsonia C.W.Dodge (1948)
- Pseudarctomia Gyeln. (1939) – 1 sp.
- Phylliscidiopsis Sambo (1937) – 1 sp.
- Solorinaria (Vain.) Gyeln. (1935) – 1 sp.
