= Thelignya =

Scientific classification
- Domain: Eukaryota
- Kingdom: Fungi
- Division: Ascomycota
- Class: Lichinomycetes
- Order: Lichinales
- Family: Lichinaceae
- Genus: Thelignya; A. Massal. (1855)

Type species
- Thelignya fuliginea (Ach.) A. Massal.

Genus of fungi

Thelignya is a genus of fungi within the family Lichinaceae. It is monotypic, containing only the single species Thelignya fuliginea.
