= Metamelanea =

Scientific classification
- Domain: Eukaryota
- Kingdom: Fungi
- Division: Ascomycota
- Class: Lichinomycetes
- Order: Lichinales
- Family: Lichinaceae
- Genus: Metamelanea; Henssen (1989)

Type species
- Metamelanea umbonata Henssen (1989)

Species
- M. caesiella M. melambola M. umbonata

Genus of lichens

Metamelanea is a small genus of lichen-forming fungi in the family Lichinaceae. It consists of three species of rock-dwelling lichens.

== Taxonomy ==
The genus was circumscribed by the German lichenologist Aino Henssen in 1989, with the newly described species M. umbonata assigned as the type, and a second included species, M. melambola. A third species was added to the genus the following year. The genus name alludes to the dark colouration of the thallus and fruiting bodies.

== Description ==
The thallus of Metamelanea appears blackish and has a cracked, areolate texture, meaning it is divided into small, island-like segments called areoles. The thallus is composed of densely packed rows of lichenised colonies containing a single-celled cyanobacterium (blue-green alga) as the photobiont. These colonies are surrounded by fungal hyphae. As the thallus grows, it tends to break up into vertical lobes. The photobiont belongs to the order Chroococcales and is characterised by a distinctive brown gelatinous sheath, which contributes to the lichen's dark appearance.

The apothecia (fruiting bodies) of Metamelanea are darkly pigmented and can be either immersed in the thallus or sitting on its surface (adnate). The appearance of the apothecia varies between species. In M. umbonata, the apothecia protrude above the thallus surface and have a distinctive umbonate (having a rounded elevation in the centre) or gyrose (convoluted or wavy) shape. When moistened, the discs of these apothecia appear strikingly black. In M. melambola, the apothecia remain immersed in the thallus and are difficult to observe when dry. Upon moistening, they become visible as flat, multidivided discs. These apothecia can grow quite large and may appear as clusters of smaller apothecia due to their divided nature.

Unlike some other genera in the Lichinaceae, the apothecia in Metamelanea develop between the lobes rather than within them. This results in the absence of a true thalline margin (a rim of thalline tissue surrounding the apothecium), despite earlier descriptions suggesting otherwise. Pycnidia, which are asexual reproductive structures, have been observed in M. umbonata. These are immersed in the thallus and contain oblong cells that produce small, rod-like conidia (asexual spores) at their tips.

== Species ==
- Metamelanea caesiella (Th.Fr.) Henssen (1990)
- Metamelanea melambola (Tuck.) Henssen (1989)
- Metamelanea umbonata Henssen (1989)
