= Pterygiopsis =

Scientific classification
- Kingdom: Fungi
- Division: Ascomycota
- Class: Lichinomycetes
- Order: Lichinales
- Family: Lichinaceae
- Genus: Pterygiopsis; Vain. (1890)

Type species
- Pterygiopsis atra Vain. (1890)

Synonyms
- Enchylium A.Massal. (1853); Forssellia Zahlbr. (1906); Pterygiopsidomyces Cif. & Tomas. (1953)

Genus of lichen-forming fungi

Pterygiopsis is a genus of lichen-forming fungi in the family Lichinaceae. It contains 12 species. These lichens form thin, blackish crusts that cling tightly to rock surfaces, especially in damp seepage zones or along stream margins, and develop pinpoint brown disc-like fruiting bodies on their surface. The genus is typically found in semi-aquatic to fully aquatic habitats, where the lichens lack distinct outer protective layers but have a slightly gelatinous texture when wet.

== Taxonomy ==
The genus was circumscribed by the Finnish lichenologist Edvard August Vainio in 1890, to contain the single Brazilian species Pterygiopsis atra. Vainio distinguished Pterygiopsis from related genera based on the structure of the thallus, which lacks a distinct upper cortical layer but possesses a lower cortical stratum formed by hyphae, and the characteristics of the apothecia and spores. The genus is characterised by having simple, colourless, ellipsoidal to subglobose spores and distinctive paraphyses that are loosely coherent and unbranched. Vainio noted the conidia as being spherical and resembling those of Stigonema, indicating the cyanobacterial nature of the photobiont.

== Description ==
Pterygiopsis forms a thin, blackish crust that clings tightly to rock surfaces, especially in damp seepage zones or along stream margins. Because the lichen is crustose—essentially painted onto its substrate—it lacks root-like anchoring threads (rhizines). Under the microscope, the fungal filaments (hyphae) are built from broadly rounded cells that spread from the attachment point in a fan-shaped pattern, giving the interior a radiating appearance. Scattered through this fabric are clusters of the photosynthetic partner: minute, spherical green algae (described as chroococcoid) each wrapped in a faint brown, jelly-like sheath. This arrangement leaves the thallus without a distinct outer skin (cortex) but lends it a slightly gelatinous texture when wet.

Fruit bodies (apothecia) develop on the thallus surface, starting partly embedded and becoming almost stalk-less (sessile) at maturity. They appear as pinpoint brown discs bordered by a low rim of thallus tissue composed of uniformly sized cells. The internal fungal wall (exciple) is so reduced that it can be hard to detect. Inside, the spore layer is embedded in jelly and threaded with paraphyses—slender, sometimes interconnected filaments whose tips swell and acquire an external brown pigment. Each spore sac (ascus) contains eight colourless, nearly spherical ascospores; the asci are thin-walled, stain reddish-brown in potassium iodide, and lack the thickened amyloid caps found in many other lichens. No asexual propagules or secondary lichen products are known to occur in the genus.

== Ecology ==
Pterygiopsis is typically saxicolous and favours semi-aquatic to fully aquatic habitats.

== Species ==
As of June 2025, Species Fungorum (in the Catalogue of Life) accepts 12 species of Pterygiopsis.

- Pterygiopsis atra Vain. (1890)
- Pterygiopsis australiensis Henssen (1990)
- Pterygiopsis cava M.Schultz (2006)
- Pterygiopsis concordatula (Nyl.) P.M.Jørg. (2007)
- Pterygiopsis convoluta Henssen (1990)
- Pterygiopsis coracodiza (Nyl.) Henssen (1990)
- Pterygiopsis densisidiata Aptroot, Oliveira Junior & M.Cáceres (2020)
- Pterygiopsis guyanensis M.Schultz, Porembski & Büdel (2000)
- Pterygiopsis lacustris P.M.Jørg. & R.Sant. (1990)
- Pterygiopsis mutabilis M.Schultz (2006)
- Pterygiopsis pulchra M.Schultz (2004)
- Pterygiopsis umbilicata (Vězda) Henssen (1990)
