= Cryptothele (lichen) =

Scientific classification
- Domain: Eukaryota
- Kingdom: Fungi
- Division: Ascomycota
- Class: Lichinomycetes
- Order: Lichinales
- Family: Lichinaceae
- Genus: Cryptothele; Th. Fr.

Type species
- Cryptothele permiscens (Nyl.) Th. Fr.

Species
- North American species: C. granuliformis C. permiscens

Genus of fungi

Cryptothele is a genus of lichen within the family Lichinaceae. The genus contains eight species, two of which are found in North America.
