= Lemmopsis =

Scientific classification
- Domain: Eukaryota
- Kingdom: Fungi
- Division: Ascomycota
- Class: Lichinomycetes
- Order: Lichinales
- Family: Lichinaceae
- Genus: Lemmopsis (Vain.) Zahlbr. (1906)

Type species
- Lemmopsis arnoldiana (Hepp) Zahlbr. (1906)

Synonyms
- Leptogium sect. Lemmopsis Vain. (1890)

Genus of lichen-forming fungi

Lemmopsis is a genus of fungi in the family Lichinaceae. These lichens form extremely small, black, crust-like growths that often appear as a thin dusting of granules on limestone rock or clay soil and become noticeably gelatinous when moist. Distinguished by their partnership with cyanobacteria that enables nitrogen fixation, they produce minute cup-shaped reproductive structures with reddish-brown discs and are identified by their combination of gelatinous thallus, robust-rimmed apothecia, and simple single-celled spores.

== Description ==
Lemmopsis forms an extremely small, black, crust-like thallus that often appears as a thin dusting of granules on calcareous rock or clay soil. When moist the surface becomes noticeably gelatinous, a sign that the fungal tissue is not layered into distinct strata but instead consists of densely packed, brick-like cells (a structure described as pseudoparenchymatous). A delicate, non-living "skin" (epinecral layer) may develop on older parts of the thallus. The photosynthetic partner is a cyanobacterium similar to Nostoc, whose spherical to slightly oval cells occur in compact clumps and enable the lichen to fix atmospheric nitrogen.

Sexual reproduction takes place in minute, cup-shaped apothecia that sit directly on the thallus. Each fruit body has a broadly flared rim (the exciple) made of intertwined fungal filaments, while the reddish-brown disc is reduced to a narrow pore at maturity. Inside the apothecium the colourless spore layer (hymenium) stains blue in iodine tests, indicating an amyloid reaction, and is threaded by slender, septate paraphyses that stick together in a weak jelly. The spore sacs (asci) are narrow clubs containing eight thick-walled, single-celled ascospores that remain colourless throughout development. No asexual propagules or lichen products have been detected, so identification relies on the combination of the minute gelatinous thallus, reddish apothecia with a robust rim, and the simple, unicellular spores.

== Species ==
- Lemmopsis affinis Samp. (1918)
- Lemmopsis arnoldiana (Hepp) Zahlbr. (1906)
- Lemmopsis lutophila (Arnold) M.Schultz & M.Prieto (2024)
- Lemmopsis oblongans (Nyl. ex Cromb.) A.L.Sm. (1918)
- Lemmopsis pelodes (Körb. ex Stein) T.L.Ellis (1981)
