= Pyrenocarpon =

Scientific classification
- Kingdom: Fungi
- Division: Ascomycota
- Class: Lichinomycetes
- Order: Lichinales
- Family: Lichinaceae
- Genus: Pyrenocarpon; Trevis.
- Species: P. thelostomum

Binomial name
- Pyrenocarpon thelostomum (Ach. ex J.Harriman) Coppins & Aptroot (2008)

Synonyms
- Montinia A.Massal. (1855); Thelochroa A.Massal. (1855)

Single-species lichen genus

Pyrenocarpon is a fungal genus in the family Lichinaceae. It is monospecific, containing the single species Pyrenocarpon thelostomum, a lichen. This rare lichen is found only in shaded stream beds in parts of Britain, including Exmoor, the Pennines, and the Scottish Highlands. It was first described as a distinct genus in 1855 by the Italian lichenologist Vittore Trevisan based on its unique waxy fruiting structures. The species grows as a thin, reddish-brown crust on hard rocks that are kept constantly wet by flowing water.

== Taxonomy ==
The genus was circumscribed by the Italian lichenologist Vittore Benedetto Antonio Trevisan de Saint-Léon in 1855. Trevisan distinguished Pyrenocarpon from related genera such as Verrucaria, Biatora, and Lecidea based on the waxy-membranaceous and coloured nature of the perithecia, which possess simple ostioles, in contrast to the horny-carbonaceous and black perithecia found in Verrucaria. The genus is characterised by having eight-spored asci with club-shaped paraphyses, ovoid simple hyaline ascospores, and a uniform crustose thallus. Trevisan noted that the genus belongs to the Verrucariarum tribe and is related to the subgenus Sphaeromphalaearum that he had previously proposed.

== Description ==
Pyrenocarpon thelostomum forms a very thin, crust-like thallus that lies flush against the rock, rarely exceeding 0.2 mm in thickness. Seen through a hand lens the surface looks minutely cracked into tiny, angular patches (an areolate texture) and ranges in colour from chestnut to reddish-brown. The lichen lacks an outer cortex, so the photobiont—minute, spherical green algae 5–7 micrometres (μm) across—is visible in section. Each algal cell sits within a faint, pale-brown, jelly-like sheath that helps retain moisture, giving the thallus a slightly gelatinous feel when damp.

Reproduction occurs in plentiful, distinctive fruit bodies that at first resemble submerged beads. These apothecia are perithecioid: initially hemispherical and completely covered by thallus tissue, they eventually open to reveal a small, paler, reddish-brown disc only about 0.3 mm wide. A conspicuously thick, pale rim of fungal tissue (the true exciple) encircles each disc, creating the fish-eye appearance by which the species is most readily recognised. Inside the cavity the spore layer does not react with iodine, and it is threaded by branched, net-like paraphyses whose tips remain narrow rather than swollen. The spore sacs (asci) are slender clubs with thin walls and lack the amyloid caps common in many lichens; each contains eight colourless, single-celled ascospores measuring roughly 17–20 × 9–12 μm. No asexual propagules or secondary lichen products have been detected.

== Ecology ==
Ecologically the species is restricted to hard, often calcareous rocks that are kept constantly wet by flowing water. In Britain it has been recorded only from shaded stream beds in Exmoor, the Pennines, north-west England, and parts of the Scottish Highlands, where its distinctive apothecia stand out against the dark, crustose thallus.
