= Trizodia =

Scientific classification
- Kingdom: Fungi
- Division: Ascomycota
- Class: Lichinomycetes
- Genus: Trizodia; Laukka (2009)

Type species
- Trizodia acrobia Laukka (2009)

Species
- T. acrobia T. silvestris

Genus of lichens

Trizodia is a small genus of ascomycete fungi placed in the class Lichinomycetes. It currently includes two species and has not yet been assigned to an order or family. The genus was established in 2010 for a microscopic fungus found living with cyanobacteria on the tips of peat moss (Sphagnum) shoots in Finland. A second species from Japanese forests was added in 2025. The two species show different degrees of partnership with their cyanobacterial associates, with one simply growing around cyanobacterial colonies on moss, the other forming a true lichen body (thallus) with internal feeding structures.

== Systematics ==
Trizodia was established in 2010 for the type species T. acrobia, a minute ascomycete with apothecia on the shoot tips of Sphagnum and consistently associated with Nostoc-like cyanobacteria. In the protologue, the authors derived the generic name from Greek for a 'small tripartite being', alluding to the association of the fungus with a cyanobacterium and its moss host. A five-gene analysis placed the lineage near Leotiomycetes, but with weak support, so its higher-level position remained uncertain. Because the fungus simply wrapped around the cyanobacterial colonies and no organised thallus was present, the authors interpreted the association as cyanotrophy (nutrition from cyanobacteria without a lichen thallus) rather than a fully lichenised symbiosis. Consistent with this interpretation, Martin Grube and Mats Wedin (2016) describe T. acrobia as a borderline lichen, i.e. a form at the interface between cyanotrophy and a fully lichenised state. A genome-scale analysis sampling 481 ascomycete genomes (1,292 single-copy genes) recovered an expanded Lichinomycetes as a strongly supported clade sister to Lecanoromycetes+Eurotiomycetes and included a Trizodia lineage. Within that framework, Trizodia resolved close to Geoglossales, a result the authors note alongside the genus's original description as a bryosymbiont; deeper nodes still vary across datasets.

Later work that added the Japanese species T. silvestris placed Trizodia in Lichinomycetes but left its order open, based on combined ITS, LSU and mtSSU sequences. In those trees it often clusters with Vezdaea, although the support is only moderate. Moriyama and colleagues identified the photobiont of T. silvestris as Nostoc (16S rRNA) and showed that this species forms tiny rounded thalli; some hyphae make haustoria that enter the cyanobacterial cells—a more clearly lichen-like state than in T. acrobia. They also noted that phylogenomic studies place Trizodia among lichen-forming lineages in Lichinomycetes, but broader sampling changes the tree, so the exact ordinal placement remains open.

Overall, the genus spans a spectrum from a cyanotrophic Sphagnum associate (T. acrobia) to a clearly lichenised, Nostoc-based form (T. silvestris); more data are needed to fix its exact placement.

=== Classification ===
Multi-gene and phylogenomic analyses agree that Trizodia belongs in Lichinomycetes, but they disagree on its closest relatives. Depending on dataset and method, it resolves near Vezdaea, near Geoglossomycetes, or next to a broader group that includes Coniocybomycetes. As a result, it is treated as incertae sedis at the order level. Contradictory placements exist: a six-gene multilocus study (nuLSU, nuSSU, mtSSU, RPB1, RPB2, MCM7) recovered Trizodia near Candelariomycetes, with limited support and no morphological corroboration.

== Description ==
Trizodia produces minute, whitish, sessile to short-stalked apothecia (tiny spore-producing fruit bodies) that are hemispherical to slightly top-shaped, smooth, and without a distinct rim. For the type species T. acrobia, the apothecia are translucent white to faintly pink when fresh, turning yellowish-brown on drying and up to about 0.24 mm across and 0.16 mm high (barely a quarter of a millimetre). The outer wall is made of long, parallel, colourless hyphae (an ectal excipulum of textura porrecta). The spore-bearing layer contains club-shaped asci (spore sacs) and slender paraphyses (sterile filaments) that do not overtop the asci. In T. acrobia, the asci stain blue in iodine after KOH pretreatment (a hemiamyloid reaction). In T. silvestris, by contrast, the asci are fissitunicate and apically thickened, with walls negative or only weakly blue in iodine even after KOH pretreatment, indicating a different staining behaviour. The spores are one-celled, colourless and smooth, and often contain one or more oil droplets (guttules). In T. acrobia they measure about 12.0–20.5 × 7.5–12.0 μm, while T. silvestris has ascospores roughly (9.7–)11–15(–17) × (6.0–)6.7–9.4(–14) μm.

The symbiotic organisation differs between the known species but centres on close association with Nostoc-type cyanobacteria. In T. acrobia (on living Sphagnum shoot apices), the fungal hyphae run over the moss surface and into the empty, water-holding hyaline cells via pores, where they envelop cyanobacterial colonies; the fungus was found wherever Sphagnum–Nostoc associations occurred and absent where cyanobacteria were lacking, consistent with obligate use of the cyanobiont. The association does not appear harmful; the authors suggested the hyphae may help position the colonies and aid passive water transport—functions also seen in lichen thalli.

Trizodia silvestris forms a true thallus—minute, granular cushions composed of globose to subglobose granules with a pseudoparenchymatous surface—within which the photobiont forms strands of Nostoc cells. Hyphae sometimes extend out of the thallus and may produce haustoria (feeding pegs) that intrude into the cyanobacterial cells. The apothecia of T. silvestris are abundant, white to whitish-orange when wet and yellowish-brown when dry, with the same basic wall construction (ectal excipulum of parallel hyphae); its paraphyses are apically swollen, and asci are clavate and fissitunicate. The cyanobiont of T. silvestris was identified by 16S rRNA data as Nostoc sensu stricto, supporting that the genus includes species with a lichen-like thallus built around this cyanobacterium.

== Habitat and distribution ==
Trizodia acrobia occurs only at the living tips of Sphagnum shoots; despite screening thousands of shoots it was absent from middle or dead parts. It occurs in boreal bogs and in coniferous forest sites where Sphagnum grows, and has been recorded on eight host species. On the moss, the fungal hyphae run over the leaf surface and into the water-holding hyaline cells to envelop Nostoc colonies. In 44 Sphagnum–Nostoc patches examined the fungus was always present, and it was not found where cyanobacteria were absent, implying a tight dependence on the cyanobiont. The holotype was collected in Finland (Kaijanneva bog, Haapavesi) on Sphagnum magellanicum. The protologue treated the distribution as Finnish and suggested it would also be found with Sphagnum in neighbouring regions. A later record from the Thuringian Forest (Germany) documents T. acrobia on the shoot tips of Sphagnum girgensohnii and S. russowii, representing the first report for Germany and extending the known range beyond Fennoscandia.

By contrast, T. silvestris was reported from humid temperate forests in Kyoto Prefecture, Japan, forming thalli and apothecia on moist peeled logs and on bryophyte mats (including the liverwort Dumortiera hirsuta). The species was typified from Sakyō-ku, Kyoto and named silvestris to reflect its forest setting, in contrast to the wetland-restricted habitat of T. acrobia. Sequencing showed that specimens from log and liverwort had virtually identical mtSSU sequences, indicating low substrate specificity within these forest microhabitats. As currently documented, the genus is known from peatland Sphagnum habitats in Finland and from humid temperate forests in Japan.
