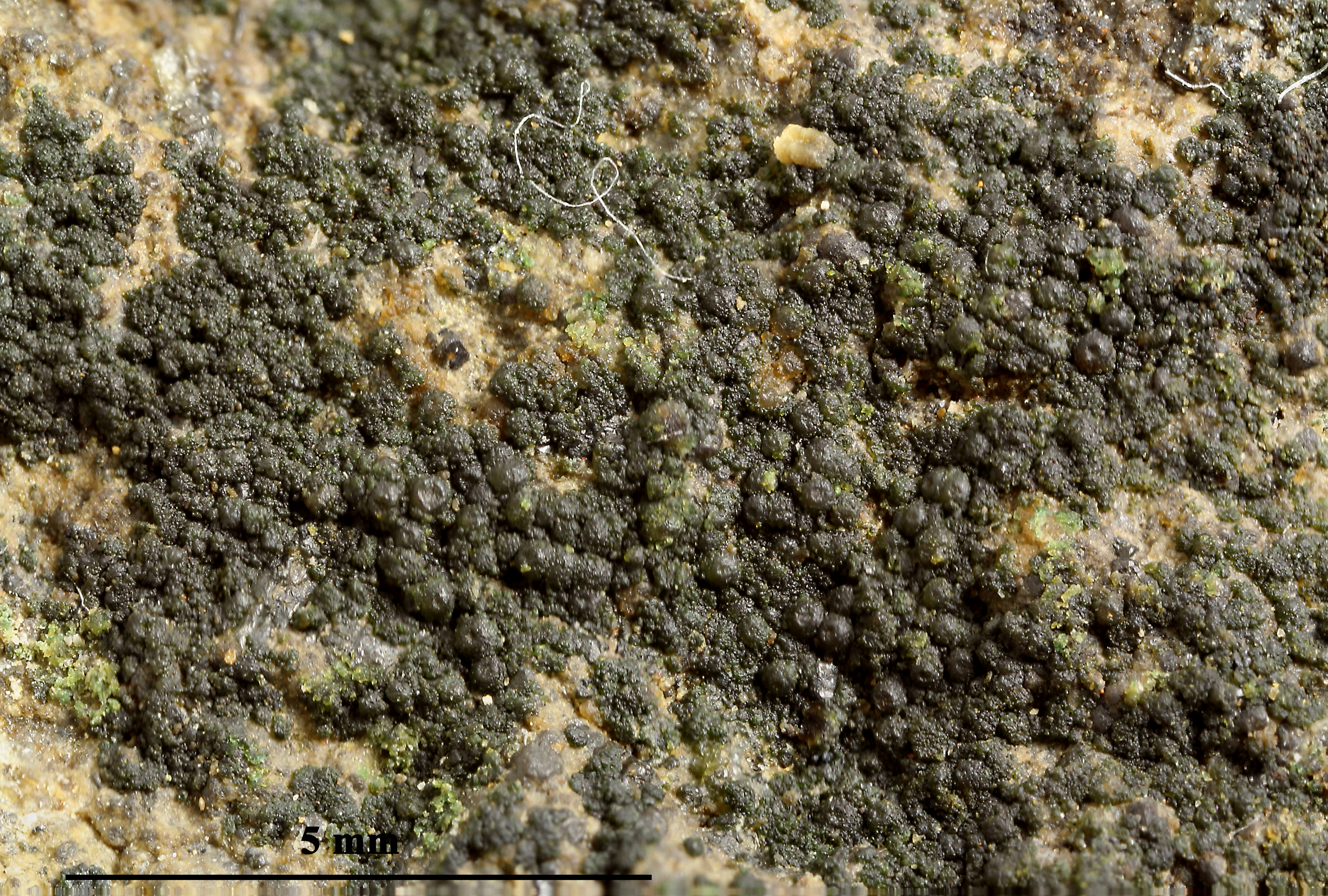
- Psorotichia murorum; scale bar=5 mm

Scientific classification
- Kingdom: Fungi
- Division: Ascomycota
- Class: Lichinomycetes
- Order: Lichinales
- Family: Lichinaceae
- Genus: Psorotichia; A.Massal. (1855)

Type species
- Psorotichia murorum A.Massal. (1855)

Synonyms
- Gonohymeniomyces Cif. & Tomas. (1953); Psorotichiomyces Cif. & Tomas. (1953); Tichospora A.Massal. ex Horw. (1912)

= Psorotichia =

Genus of lichen-forming fungi

Psorotichia is a genus of saxicolous (rock-dwelling) lichens in the family Lichinaceae. The genus can be distinguished from other rock-dwelling lichens by its distinctive dark colouration and granular texture. Unlike many lichens that form leafy or branched structures, Psorotichia species create only thin, crusty patches that blend closely with the rock surface. Their small fruiting bodies are often difficult to spot without magnification, appearing as tiny dark dots embedded in the crust.

== Taxonomy ==
The genus was circumscribed by the Italian lichenologist Abramo Bartolommeo Massalongo in 1855, with Psorotichia murorum assigned as the type species. The genus has long been placed in the class Lichinomycetes and traditionally assigned to the family Lichinaceae. A multilocus phylogenetic study of the Lichinomycetes found that several long-standing family and genus circumscriptions in the class did not match evolutionary relationships inferred from DNA data. Using a combination of morphological criteria (especially ascoma development and ascus type) together with the phylogeny, the authors proposed a revised higher-level classification of the class, recognising four families (three emended and one newly described) and providing an updated overview of the accepted genera. In this framework Psorotichia is retained within an emended Lichinaceae as a distinct genus consistent with the molecular results. Subsequent historical work has also clarified some names previously placed in Psorotichia, showing that a few "Psorotichia" taxa belong in other cyanolichen genera, which reduced confusion around the genus' limits established since Massalongo's time.

== Description ==
Psorotichia forms a thin, dark green to almost black crust that adheres closely to lime-rich rock. At first glance the surface looks like a scatter of minute granules or tiny, partially overlapping flakes, but when damp it swells slightly and acquires a jelly-like consistency; this texture reflects the absence of a protective cortex and the presence of closely packed, brick-like fungal cells throughout the thallus. Light-harvesting partners are single-celled cyanobacteria of the genus Chroococcidiopsis: each cell, or small cluster of cells, is wrapped in a slim gelatinous coat that often becomes yellow-brown near the surface, giving the thallus a faint bronze sheen in section.

Sexual fruit bodies (apothecia) sit more or less flush with the thallus surface. They begin as tiny, urn-shaped cavities but may mature into shallow to slightly domed discs. A rim of thallus tissue surrounds the disc, merging in colour with the surrounding crust, while an internal fungal wall (exciple) remains paler and better developed around the sides than at the base. The interior spore layer is colourless and stains blue with iodine, and it rests on a wedge-shaped basal tissue known as the hypothecium. Between the spore sacs (asci) run slender filaments called paraphyses; these branch sparingly towards their tips, and one or more terminal cells become distinctly swollen. Each ascus has a thin wall, lacks the amyloid caps common in many lichens, and contains four to eight colourless, single-celled ascospores. Asexual spores are produced in submerged flask-shaped bodies (pycnidia) that appear as minute warts; they are rod-shaped and likewise colourless. Chemical spot tests and thin-layer chromatography have not revealed any secondary lichen substances, so identification relies on morphology and the association with Chroococcidiopsis.

== Species ==
As of October 2025, Species Fungorum (in the Catalogue of Life) accepts 27 species of Psorotichia.

- Psorotichia allobrogensis Hue (1896)
- Psorotichia americana Vain. (1896)
- Psorotichia arenaticola Eggerth (1889)
- Psorotichia argentinica Müll.Arg. (1889)
- Psorotichia asiatica Vain. (1888)
- Psorotichia aspicilioides Vain. (1915)
- Psorotichia boergesenii Vain. (1915)
- Psorotichia calcigena Zahlbr. (1930)
- Psorotichia cataractae Zahlbr. (1926)
- Psorotichia claudelii Hue (1896)
- Psorotichia claudelii Hue (1896)
- Psorotichia diaphorotheca Harm. (1910)
- Psorotichia diffundens (Nyl.) Arnold (1869)
- Psorotichia dispersa H. Magn. (1944)
- Psorotichia ecrustacea Harm. (1905)
- Psorotichia gorgonina Vain. (1901)
- Psorotichia granulosa Flagey ex Harm. (1905)
- Psorotichia gyelnikii S.Y.Kondr., Lőkös & Hur (2016)
- Psorotichia hassei Fink ex J.Hedrick (1933)
- Psorotichia henriquesii Samp. (1918)
- Psorotichia heterocarpa G.Merr. (1930)
- Psorotichia heterothallina Vain. (1921)
- Psorotichia incavata H.Magn. (1945)
- Psorotichia kansuensis H.Magn. (1940)
- Psorotichia macrospora Samp. (1924)
- Psorotichia minuta H.Magn. (1940)
- Psorotichia mongolica H.Magn. (1940)
- Psorotichia moravica Zahlbr. (1928)
- Psorotichia murorum A.Massal. (1855)
- Psorotichia nigra H.Magn. (1940)
- Psorotichia polyspora M.Schultz & Büdel (2000)
- Psorotichia pontresinae B.de Lesd. (1910)
- Psorotichia pyrenopsoides (Nyl.) Forssell (1885)
- Psorotichia recondita Arnold (1885)
- Psorotichia rimosa Henssen (1990)
- Psorotichia rufescens Hy (1893)
- Psorotichia sinaiensis Vain. (1926)
- Psorotichia sinensis Zahlbr. (1930)
- Psorotichia tongletii B.de Lesd. (1909)
- Psorotichia yoshimurae H.Harada (2023) – Japan

The taxon Psorotichia schaereri (A.Massal.) Arnold (1869) was found to be not related to the type species of Psorotichia, and was transferred to Collemopsis, a genus resurrected from synonymy with Psorotichia.

Psorotichia segregata was determined to be the same species as Lempholemma chalazanum.
