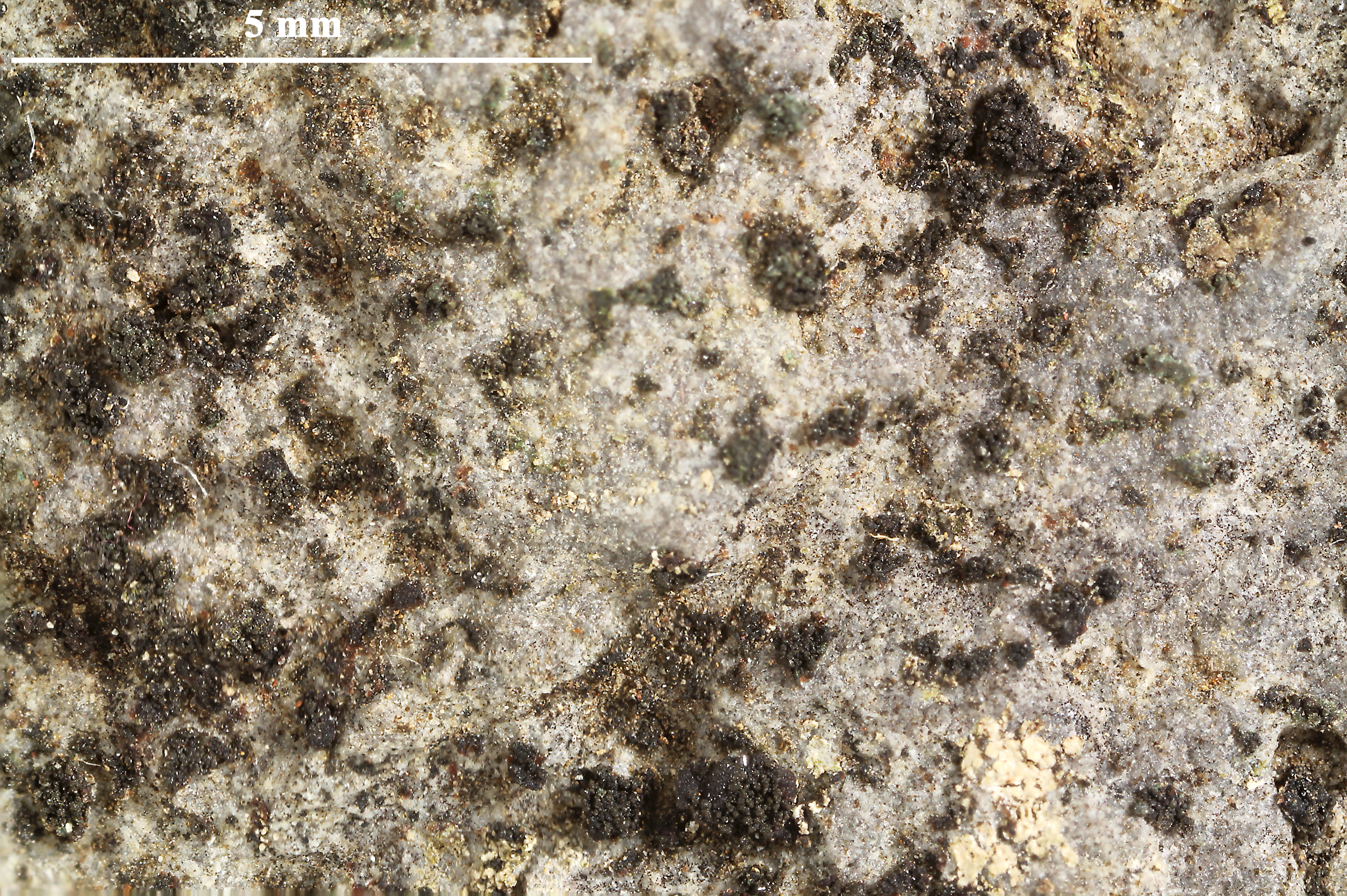
- Porocyphus coccodes

Scientific classification
- Kingdom: Fungi
- Division: Ascomycota
- Class: Lichinomycetes
- Order: Lichinales
- Family: Porocyphaceae
- Genus: Porocyphus; Körb. (1855)

Type species
- Porocyphus coccodes (Flot.) Körb. (1855)

Synonyms
- Lichiniza Nyl. (1881); Psoropsis Nyl. ex Zwackh (1883); Homopsella Nyl. (1887); Homopsellomyces Cif. & Tomas. (1953)

= Porocyphus =

Genus of lichen-forming fungi

Porocyphus is a genus of lichen-forming fungi in the family Porocyphaceae. The genus was established in 1855 by the German lichenologist Gustav Wilhelm Körber to distinguish certain lichens from the related genus Collema, based on differences in their reproductive structures. Porocyphus species are found worldwide and are characterised by their pore-like fruiting bodies and simple spores. They form dark, gelatinous crusts on rocks, soil, and bark.

== Taxonomy ==
The genus Porocyphus was circumscribed by the German lichenologist Gustav Wilhelm Körber in 1855 to accommodate certain gymnocarpous lichens (lichens with exposed fruiting bodies) that had previously been classified under Collema. Körber distinguished Porocyphus from Collema based on the distinctive nature of the apothecia, particularly the differences in thallus structure and the characteristics of the hymenial layer and paraphyses. The genus name is derived from the Greek words πόρος ('pore', 'passage') and κύφος ('hump', 'swelling'), referring to the small tubercular fruiting bodies. Körber noted that while the external form of the apothecia and the stratified thallus structure might suggest placement within Collema, the distinctive pore-like apothecial discs (often arising as pycnoascocarps) associated hymenial/paraphysis characters warranted generic separation, emphasizing the gymnocarpous nature of these lichens. Although later authors generally treated Porocyphus in Lichinaceae, a comprehensive 2024 multilocus study re-circumscribed Porocyphaceae and placed Porocyphus in that family.

A 2024 multilocus re-classification of the Lichinomycetes transferred the Lichina "willeyi" group into Porocyphus, publishing new combinations for (among others) P. antarcticus, P. macrosporus, P. minutissimus, P. rosulans, P. tasmanicus and P. willeyi.

== Description ==
Porocyphus forms a dark, gelatinous crust that clings tightly to rock, soil or bark. Its surface can appear as a scatter of tiny grains, cracked areoles, diminutive leaf-like patches or, in some species, minute shrub-like tufts bearing granular outgrowths (isidia). Because the lichen lacks a true outer skin (cortex) and any internal layering, the fungal threads (hyphae) run directly through the thallus. Near the point of attachment those hyphae often pack into a narrow brick-like band, while elsewhere they fan out like water from a fountain, each short cell radiating from the base. The photosynthetic partner is a rivularioid cyanobacterium (often Calothrix); its usual long filaments are so fragmented inside the lichen that they often resemble solitary cells, yet they still provide the dual benefits of photosynthesis and nitrogen fixation.

Sexual fruit bodies (apothecia) develop either in the ordinary way or by transforming tiny asexual chambers (pycnidia) into so-called pycnoascocarps. They start out buried in the thallus and become flush with the surface or slightly stalked as they mature. A persistent rim of thallus tissue (the thalline margin) commonly surrounds the pore-like disc, though this rim may erode with age to expose the inner fungal wall (exciple). The exciple is colourless to pale brown and conspicuous above but tapers below. Inside, a colourless or faintly brown base supports a spore layer threaded with densely branched, interconnected paraphyses; in pycnoascocarps these may mingle with elongated conidiophores left over from the asexual stage. Chemical tests with iodine stain the gelatinous matrix from yellow to blue, yet the asci themselves show no amyloid reaction and lack the thickened tips seen in many lichens. Each ascus usually contains eight simple, ellipsoidal ascospores that have no internal walls or outer gelatinous coat. Asexual reproduction still occurs in separate pycnidia, which sit immersed in the thallus or in tiny warts; they release colourless, spherical to short-ellipsoid conidia. Thin-layer chromatography has revealed no secondary lichen substances, so the genus is diagnosed chiefly by its gelatinous, dark thallus with Calothrix photobiont, its pore-like apothecia that may arise from pycnidia, and its simple, non-septate spores.

== Species ==
- Porocyphus antarcticus (Cromb.) M.Schultz & M.Prieto (2024)
- Porocyphus coccodes Flot. ex Körb. (1855)
- Porocyphus kalbarriensis Henssen (1990)
- Porocyphus kenmorensis (H.B.Holl ex Nyl.) Henssen (1974)
- Porocyphus leptogiella (Nyl.) T.L.Ellis (1981)
- Porocyphus lichinelloides Henssen (1963)
- Porocyphus macrosporus (Henssen, Büdel & Wessels) M.Schultz & M.Prieto (2024)
- Porocyphus minutissimus (Henssen) M.Schultz (2024)
- Porocyphus rehmicus (A.Massal.) Zahlbr. (1924)
- Porocyphus rosulans (Henssen) M.Schultz (2024)
- Porocyphus tasmanicus (Henssen) M.Schultz (2024)
- Porocyphus willeyi (Tuck.) M.Schultz & M.Prieto (2024)
