= Lapismalleus =

Scientific classification
- Kingdom: Fungi
- Division: Ascomycota
- Class: Lichinomycetes
- Order: Lichinales
- Family: Porocyphaceae
- Genus: Lapismalleus; M.Schultz & M.Prieto (2024)
- Species: L. lugubris

Binomial name
- Lapismalleus lugubris (A.Massal.) M.Schultz & M.Prieto (2024)

Synonyms
- List: Stenhammara lugubris A.Massal. (1856); Lecidea sublugens Nyl. (1858); Pyrenopsis lugubris (A.Massal.) Nyl. (1869); Pyrenocarpon lugubre (A.Massal.) Trevis. (1880); Aspicilia lugubris (A.Massal.) Arnold (1881); Psorotichia lugubris (A.Massal.) A.Massal. ex Arnold (1885); Lecidea lugubris Sommerf. (1826); Skolekites lugubris (Sommerf.) Norman (1852); Psora lugubris (Sommerf.) A.Massal. (1854); Schaereria lugubris (Sommerf.) Körb. (1855); Biatora lugubris (Sommerf.) Hepp (1860); Toninia lugubris (Sommerf.) Th.Fr. (1861); Bilimbia lugubris (Sommerf.) Th.Fr. (1874); Bacidia lugubris (Sommerf.) Zahlbr. (1905); Fuscidea lugubris (Sommerf.) P.James & Purvis (1992); Stenhammara lugubris var. pannosa Arnold (1860); Psorotichia lugubris f. pannosa (Arnold) Arnold (1885)

Genus of lichens

Lapismalleus is a monospecific genus of lichen-forming ascomycetes in the family Porocyphaceae. It was circumscribed in 2024 as part of a molecular phylogenetics-informed reclassification of the class Lichinomycetes; the genus was created to accommodate a single species, Lapismalleus lugubris. The species has had a complicated taxonomic history, having been placed in at least nine different genera since its original description in the mid-19th century. It forms distinctive dark crusts with thick, cracked patches that often reveal a pale cottony base layer as they age.

== Taxonomy ==
Lapismalleus was introduced by Matthias Schultz and María Prieto in 2024 during a broad revision of Lichinomycetes based on a multilocus molecular phylogenetics analysis. Within the revised framework it is placed in the family Porocyphaceae. The type and only species is Lapismalleus lugubris, proposed as a new combination for Stenhammara lugubris, which was originally described by Abramo Bartolommeo Massalongo in 1856. The species has also been known as Psorotichia lugubris (A.Massal.) Arnold (1885), with infraspecific names including Stenhammara lugubris f. atrata Arnold (1860). The generic name, from lapis and malleus, deliberately echoes Christian Stenhammar's name and the tangled 19th-century usage of Stenhammara.

== Description ==
Lapismalleus has a black to dark olive-brown, crustose thallus that breaks into thick areoles; older parts often erode to reveal a pale, cottony basal layer. The thallus is ecorticate and paraplectenchymatous (a dense, brick-like tissue), with robust hyphae arranged more or less vertically. The photobiont is a cyanobacterium present as single cells in a yellow-brown gelatinous sheath. Apothecia are zeorine in form (with both a thalline and a proper margin); the proper margin is dark and distinctly thickened toward the rim, and the discs are dark reddish-brown to nearly black. The asci are of the Lichina type and eight-spored; ascospores are simple, hyaline and broadly ellipsoid. Pycnidia are present and produce short bacilliform conidia. No secondary metabolites have been reported in Lapismalleus by thin-layer chromatography.

== Habitat and distribution ==
Lapismalleus lugubris grows on inclined, well-lit, seeping calcareous rock; it also occurs seasonally in shallow rock pools in alvar landscapes. As currently known it is restricted to Central and Northern Europe.
