= Paulia (fungus) =

Scientific classification
- Kingdom: Fungi
- Division: Ascomycota
- Class: Lichinomycetes
- Order: Lichinales
- Family: Lichinaceae
- Genus: Paulia; Fée

Genus of fungi

Paulia is a genus of lichenized fungi within the family Lichinaceae. It contains five species.

The genus name of Paulia is in honour of Paul Fée (c. 1819-1829), the son of the author Antoine Laurent Apollinaire Fée.

The genus was circumscribed in Linnaea Vol.10 on page 466 in 1836.
