= Anema (lichen) =

Scientific classification
- Domain: Eukaryota
- Kingdom: Fungi
- Division: Ascomycota
- Class: Lichinomycetes
- Order: Lichinales
- Family: Lichinaceae
- Genus: Anema; Nyl. ex Forssell (1885)

Type species
- Anema decipiens (A.Massal.) Forssell (1885)

Genus of fungi

Anema is a genus of lichen within the family Lichinaceae. The genus contains at least 13 species.

== Species ==
Species names associated at some time with Anema are as follows:

- Anema asahinae
- Anema botryosum
- Anema botyosum
- Anema bullatum
- Anema camaromorpha
- Anema cernohorskyi
- Anema decipiens
- Anema diffusum
- Anema dodgei
- Anema exiguum
- Anema jenisejense
- Anema jenisejensis
- Anema latissimum
- Anema moedlingense
- Anema nodulosum
- Anema notarisii
- Anema nummulariellum
- Anema nummularium
- Anema plicatissimum
- Anema prodigula
- Anema prodigulum
- Anema suffruticosum
- Anema tumidulum
- Anema veronense
- Anema veronensis
