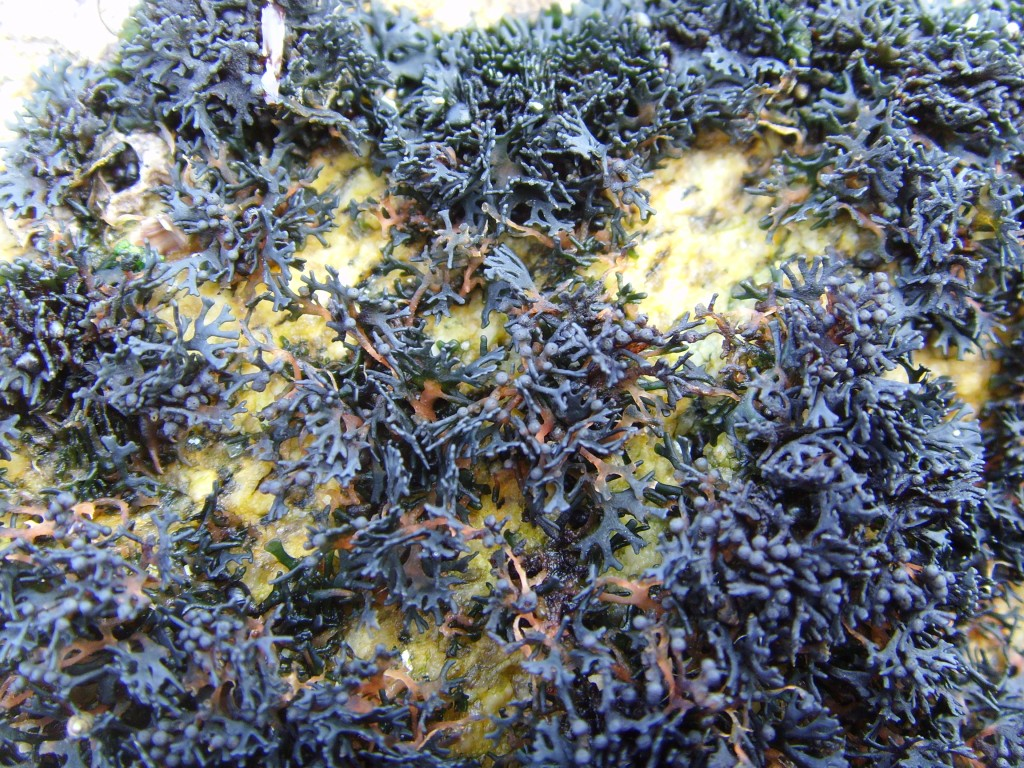
- Lichina pygmaea

Scientific classification
- Kingdom: Fungi
- Division: Ascomycota
- Class: Lichinomycetes
- Order: Lichinales
- Family: Lichinaceae
- Genus: Lichina; C.Agardh (1817)

Type species
- Lichina pygmaea (Lightf.) C.Agardh (1817)

Species
- L. canariensis L. confinis L. intermedia L. pygmaea

= Lichina =

Genus of lichen-forming fungi

Lichina is a genus of lichen-forming fungi in the family Lichinaceae. The genus contains four marine species. These cyanolichens include species such as L. pygmaea or L. confinis, in which the associated cyanobiont has been assigned to the genus Rivularia. Furthermore, evidence of a high specificity of each mycobiont towards particular cyanobiont lineages in both species has been detected.

== Taxonomy ==
Lichina was circumscribed by the Swedish botanist Carl Adolph Agardh in 1817. He assigned Lichina pygmaea as the type species. This lichen was originally described by John Lightfoot in 1777 as Fucus pygmaea in his work Flora Scotica.

== Description ==
Lichina species form characteristic black fruiting thalli associated with cyanobacteria. They often create distinguishable bands in the intertidal and supralittoral zones of rocky coastal areas in temperate and cold regions of both hemispheres. The thalli are typically dwarf-fruticose, with branches that can be rounded or flattened depending on the species and growth conditions.

== Habitat, distribution, and ecology ==
Lichina species are found in maritime habitats worldwide. Three species (L. pygmaea, L. confinis, and L. canariensis) occur in the Northern Hemisphere, while L. intermedia is restricted to the Southern Hemisphere. They typically grow on rocky shores, with different species occupying distinct zones based on their tolerance to submersion and sea spray.

Lichina species play important roles in rocky coastal ecosystems. They are often associated with diverse bacterial communities and can form biofilms on rock surfaces. The genus shows varying levels of genetic diversity, with L. intermedia showing particularly high intraspecific variation.

== Evolutionary history and biogeography ==
Molecular studies suggest that the diversification of the genus Lichina began between 22.8 and 84.65 million years ago. The current geographic distribution of Lichina species is believed to be the result of long-distance dispersal events across ocean basins, rather than ancient vicariance.

== Species ==
The following species are recognized in the genus Lichina:

- Lichina canariensis Pérez-Ort., de los Ríos & Garrido-Benavent (2023)
- Lichina confinis (O.F.Müll.) C.Agardh (1821)
- Lichina intermedia (C.Bab.) M.Schultz (2017)
- Lichina pygmaea (Lightf.) C.Agardh (1817)

Recent phylogenetic studies have led to a reevaluation of the genus Lichina. Several species previously included in the genus, such as L. antarctica, L. minutissima, L. tasmanica, and L. willeyi, are now considered to be phylogenetically distinct from the core Lichina group. These species, along with others like L. rosulans and L. polycarpa, are typically non-marine and form pycnoascocarps, characteristics that set them apart from the four recognised marine Lichina species. As a result, they are likely to be reclassified into different genera in future taxonomic revisions. Additionally, some species like L. antarctica and L. macrospora require further phylogenetic evaluation to determine their taxonomic placement.
