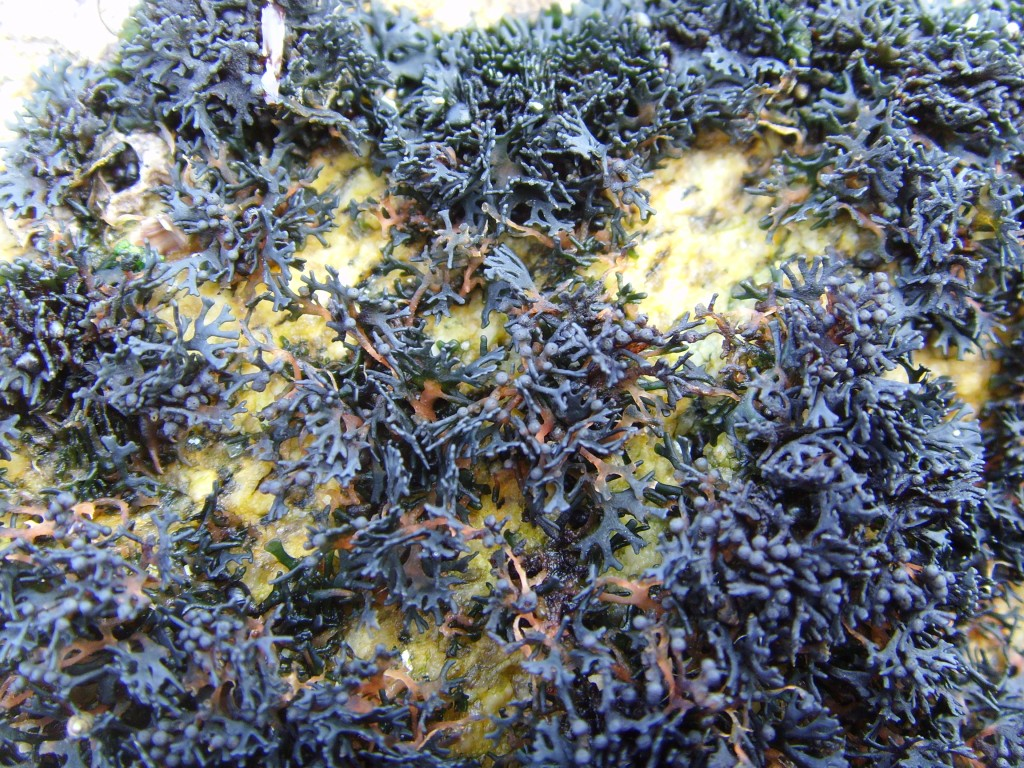
- Lichina pygmaea

Scientific classification
- Kingdom: Fungi
- Division: Ascomycota
- Class: Lichinomycetes; V.Reeb, Lutzoni & Cl.Roux (2004)
- Order: Lichinales; Henssen & Büdel (1986)

Families
- Gloeoheppiaceae; Lichinaceae; Lichinellaceae; Peltulaceae; Phylliscaceae; Genera incertae sedis Trizodia

= Lichinales =

Order of fungi

Lichinales is the sole order of ascomycete fungi in the class Lichinomycetes. It contains three families: Gloeoheppiaceae (3 genera), Lichinaceae (43 genera), and Peltulaceae (1 genus). Most species are lichenized. Lichinales was proposed in 1986 by German lichenologists Aino Henssen and Burkhard Büdel. The class Lichinomycetes was created by Valérie Reeb, François Lutzoni and Claude Roux in 2004.

A study published in late 2022 suggests that six classes of fungi, Candelariomycetes, Coniocybomycetes, Geoglossomycetes, Lichinomycetes, Sareomycetes, and Xylonomycetes, are all part of a clade that has a sister relationship with a clade containing Lecanoromycetes and Eurotiomycetes. Lichinomycetes is the oldest name among these orders, and so the authors used this name for the group. Phylogenomic analysis of a 481-genome set showed that as a group, the Lichinomycetes have relatively small genomes, and fewer metabolic gene clusters; one consequence of this is an inability to break down cellulose and pectin. Because of this reduced metabolic capability, Lichinomycetes fungi may have adapted to partner symbiotically with other species to compensate for these losses.

The genus Trizodia is currently included in Lichinomycetes based on multi-locus analyses that sampled the Japanese species T. silvestris; these data place the genus in the class but leave its order open (sometimes near Vezdaea). A genome-scale phylogenomic study of 1,292 single-copy genes likewise recovered an expanded Lichinomycetes that includes a Trizodia lineage, supporting its class-level placement even though the ordinal rank remains incertae sedis. Earlier multilocus work offered alternative placements with limited support (e.g., near Candelariomycetes), so recent treatments retain Trizodia in Lichinomycetes pending denser sampling.

== Photobionts ==
A 2021 study of photobionts (photosynthetic partners) in Lichinales lichens suggested that cyanobiont diversity in the group is broader than earlier morphology-based identifications had indicated. Using a polyphasic approach that combined culture observations, microscopy, and DNA sequence data, the authors examined photobionts from species of Lichinella, Peccania, and Peltula, and recovered lineages assignable to Aliterella, Sinocapsa, and Komarekiella. They also described two new cyanobacterial genera, Pseudocyanosarcina and Compactococcus, together with seven new species associated with lichens in the order. The study therefore suggests that Lichinales is an important source of previously overlooked cyanobacterial diversity, and that older assignments of unicellular photobionts to Chroococcidiopsis had obscured a more complex pattern of symbiosis.
