= Peltula lobata =

Scientific classification
- Kingdom: Fungi
- Division: Ascomycota
- Class: Lichinomycetes
- Order: Lichinales
- Family: Peltulaceae
- Genus: Peltula
- Species: P. lobata

Binomial name
- Peltula lobata J.Marques, M.Schultz & Paz-Berm. (2013)

Species of lichen

Peltula lobata is a species of foliose and saxicolous (rock-dwelling) lichen in the family Peltulaceae. Formally described in 2013, this lichen typically colonises vertical, sun-exposed rock crevices along riverbanks and periodically submerged surfaces in temporary riverbeds. The species grows primarily on schist, quartzite, and granite substrates, and forms large, conspicuous brown patches at relatively low elevations. Originally documented in northeastern Portugal, it has also been recorded at two sites in Spain. P. lobata grows in Mediterranean environments characterised by sub-humid to semi-arid conditions, where it often serves as the sole coloniser of thin cracks or river-washed crevices before giving way to other species as these habitats develop.

== Taxonomy ==
It was formally described as a new species in 2013 by Joana Marques, Matthias Schultz, and Graciela Paz-Bermúdez. The type specimen was collected by the first author from narrow crevices on vertical schist surfaces in the Vale de José Esteves (Vila Nova de Foz Côa) at an altitude of 186 m (610 ft).

== Habitat and distribution ==
Peltula lobata frequently colonises vertical, sun-exposed rock crevices along riverbanks and periodically submerged rock surfaces in temporary riverbeds. While it commonly grows on schist, the species also establishes on quartzite and granite substrates. P. lobata often serves as the sole coloniser of the thinnest cracks or river-washed crevices. As these crevices widen and accumulate soil, other terricolous (soil-dwelling) species begin to appear, including Endocarpon pusillum and Peltula patellata. The species occasionally displays muscicolous behaviour (growing over mosses), particularly when bryophytes such as Grimmia laevigata and Grimmia dissimulata are present.

The species has a limited known distribution, having been documented (at the time of its original publication) in only ten localities in northeastern Portugal, where it forms large, conspicuous brown patches at relatively low elevations (between 130 and 500 metres above sea level). It has also been recorded at two sites in Spain: one in the Province of Salamanca at 700 metres elevation and another in Almeria province at 780 metres.

On rock surfaces, the species frequently associates with siliceous rain-track lichen communities. In these habitats, it grows alongside other Peltula species such as P. euploca and P. obscurans, as well as other members of the order Lichinales. Additional lichen associates in the driest areas of these rock surfaces include Pyrenopsis triptococca, Lichinella stipatula, Caloplaca subsoluta, and Aspicilia contorta subsp. hoffmanniana.

All documented occurrences of P. lobata have been within the sub-humid to semi-arid ombroclimate of the meso-Mediterranean to topographically influenced thermo-Mediterranean belts of the Mediterranean Region. These habitats are typically characterised by vegetation including Quercus rotundifolia and Juniperus oxycedrus, or cultivated olive and vine plantations.
