= Brianaria =

Scientific classification
- Kingdom: Fungi
- Division: Ascomycota
- Class: Lecanoromycetes
- Order: Lecanorales
- Family: Psoraceae
- Genus: Brianaria; S.Ekman & M.Svensson (2014)

Type species
- Brianaria sylvicola (Flot. ex Körb.) S.Ekman & M.Svenss. (2014)

Species
- B. bauschiana B. lutulata B. sylvicola B. tuberculata

Genus of lichens

Brianaria is a lichen genus in the family Psoraceae. It was circumscribed in 2014 by Stefan Ekman and Måns Svensson to contain four closely related species formerly in the Micarea sylvicola group.

== Taxonomy ==
Brianaria was introduced in 2014 to accommodate the long-recognised "Micarea sylvicola group", whose species proved—by DNA analyses and shared anatomical traits—to fall outside Micarea in the strict sense. The authors recombined four former Micarea species as Brianaria. The genus name honours Brian John Coppins for his work on crustose lichens. In phylogenetic studies Brianaria forms a single, well-supported lineage within the family Psoraceae and is probably the sister group to Psora and Protoblastenia, rather than part of the Ectolechiaceae where Micarea sits.

The separation of the genera rests on clear diagnostic characters. Brianaria has a green-algal partner (photobiont) that is not the micareoid type typical of Micarea; its tiny, convex fruiting discs (apothecia) lack a distinct rim (no excipulum); the spore sacs (asci) are of the Psora-type with a broad, dark "tube" that widens towards the tip; the accessory filaments in the hymenium (paraphyses) occur in two forms (dimorphic); the sexual spores are 0–1-septate; and the asexual reproductive structures (pycnidia) are sunk in the thallus and produce short, rod-shaped conidia. Taken together, these features set Brianaria apart from Micarea in the strict sense, from Psora (which is squamulose in form and chemically different), and from Protoblastenia (which has anthraquinone pigments and a developed rim).

Nomenclaturally, the type species traces back to Lecidea sylvicola, validated by Gustav Wilhelm Körber in 1855 (after an invalid mention by Julius von Flotow in 1829), later placed in Micarea, and finally transferred to Brianaria when the genus was erected.

== Description ==
Characteristics of the genus Brianaria include the small, convex apothecia that lack an excipulum; an ascus of the "Psora"-type; 0–1-septate ascospores, dimorphic paraphyses, and immersed pycnidia that contain bacilliform conidia. The photobiont is chlorococcoid, and non-micareoid.

== Species ==
- Brianaria bauschiana (Körb.) S.Ekman & M.Svenss. (2014)
- Brianaria lutulata (Nyl.) S.Ekman & M.Svenss. (2014)
- Brianaria sylvicola (Flot. ex Körb.) S.Ekman & M.Svenss. (2014)
- Brianaria tuberculata (Sommerf.) S.Ekman & M.Svenss. (2014)
