= Brianaria sylvicola =

Scientific classification
- Domain: Eukaryota
- Kingdom: Fungi
- Division: Ascomycota
- Class: Lecanoromycetes
- Order: Lecanorales
- Family: Psoraceae
- Genus: Brianaria
- Species: B. sylvicola

Binomial name
- Brianaria sylvicola (Flot. ex Körb.) S.Ekman & M.Svenss. (2014)

Synonyms
- Biatora sylvicola (Flot. ex Körb.) Müll.Arg. (1862); Lecidea aggerata Mudd (1861); Lecidea contigua f. aggerata (Mudd) Leight. (1871); Lecidea hellbomii J.Lahm (1870); Lecidea sylvicola Flot. ex Körb. (1855); Lecidea sylvicola Flot. (1829); Lecidea sylvicola f. aggerata (Mudd) Zahlbr. (1925); Lecidea sylvicola f. hellbomii (J.Lahm) Leight. (1879); Lecidea sylvicola var. hellbomii (J.Lahm) Leight.; Lecidea vainioi H.Magn. (1949); Micarea sylvicola (Flot. ex Körb.) Vězda & V.Wirth (1976); Microlecia sylvicola (Flot. ex Körb.) M.Choisy (1949)

Species of lichen

Brianaria sylvicola is a species of saxicolous lichen in the family Psoraceae. It is also the type species of genus Brianaria.

== Taxonomy ==
The species was first named Lecidea sylvicola by Julius von Flotow in 1829. This name, however, was not published validly because it did not follow the conventions of the code for botanical nomenclature; namely, it did not provide a diagnosis or reference to a validly published diagnosis. Gustav Wilhelm Körber published the species validly in 1855. In 2014, Stefan Ekman and Måns Svensson circumscribed the genus Brianaria to contain four closely related species formerly in the Micarea sylvicola group, and made Brianaria sylvicola the type species.

== Description ==
Brianaria sylvicola is a crustose lichen that grows on rocks. It prefers acidic rocks, particularly those that are in the shade and protected from the rain. Occasionally, the lichen is found growing on other substrates, such as wood or rusted iron.

No lichen substances are found in Brianaria sylvicola that are detectable by thin-layer chromatography.
