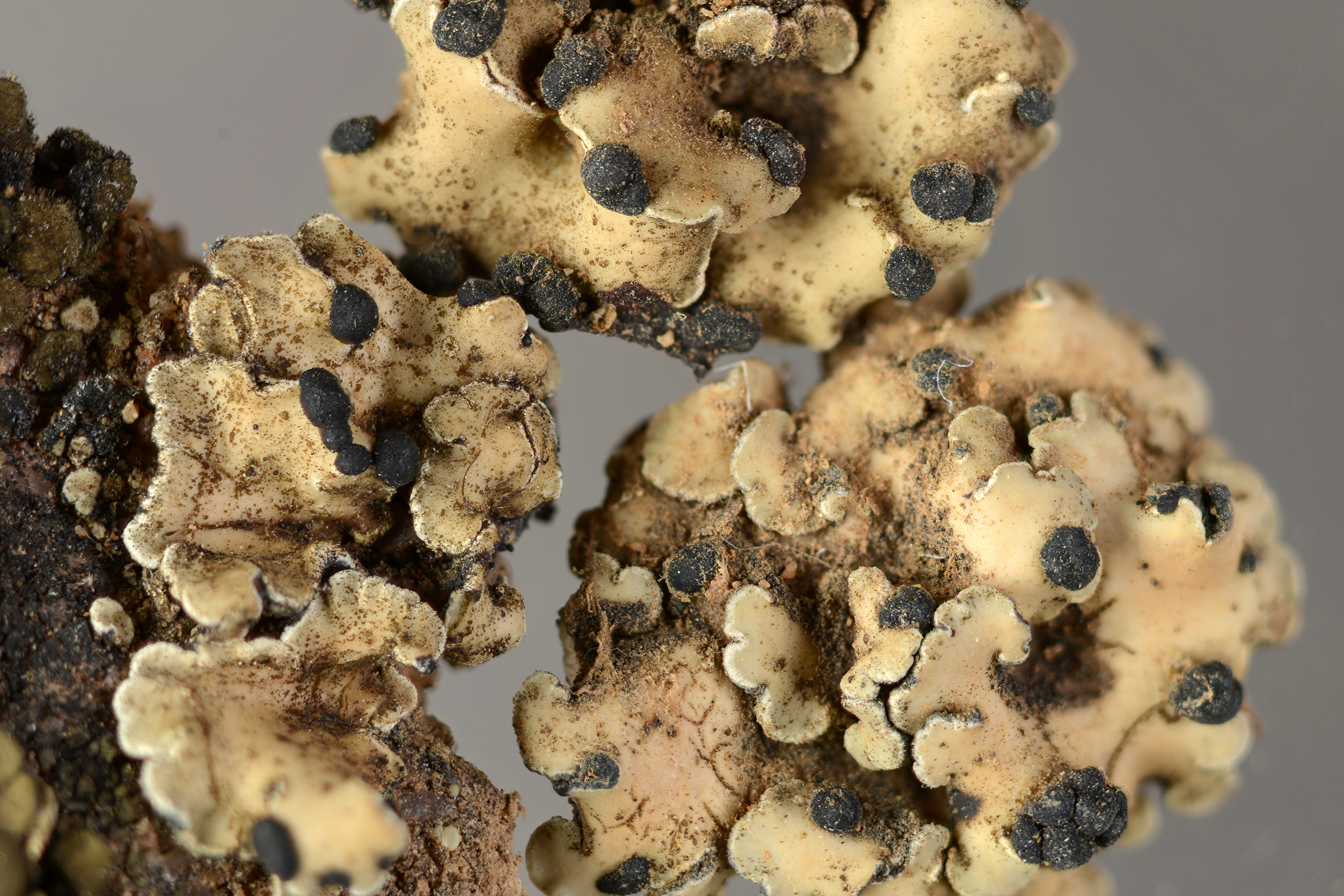
- Glyphopeltis ligustica from South Africa

Scientific classification
- Kingdom: Fungi
- Division: Ascomycota
- Class: Lecanoromycetes
- Order: Lecanorales
- Family: Psoraceae
- Genus: Glyphopeltis; Brusse (1985)
- Species: G. ligustica

Binomial name
- Glyphopeltis ligustica (B.de Lesd.) Timdal (1988)

Synonyms
- Psora ligustica B.de Lesd. (1935); Lecidea ligustica (B.de Lesd.) Sbarbaro (1943); Glyphopeltis eburina Brusse (1985); Xanthopsorella llimonae Hertel (1987)

= Glyphopeltis =

Single-species genus of lichen

Glyphopeltis is a genus of lichen-forming fungi. It has historically been placed in the family Psoraceae, but a 2025 molecular study found that it falls outside the main Psoraceae lineage and proposed a separate family, Glyphopeltidaceae, to accommodate it.

The genus is monospecific, containing the single species Glyphopeltis ligustica. It has been reported from South Africa and from Mediterranean Europe (including Portugal, Spain, and Italy). Unlike most superficially similar psoroid lichens, Glyphopeltis is typically attached at a single central point (an umbilicate habit) rather than by rhizoids, and it has shield-like (peltate) squamules; it is also recorded as lichenicolous, growing on Peltula at least when young. Microscopically, it differs from Psora in lacking the calcium oxalate crystals and anthraquinone pigments that are typical of Psora apothecia.

Franklin Brusse introduced Glyphopeltis in 1985 for a species he described as G. eburina, based on material collected from the shaded underside of a dolerite boulder in Cape Province. Later work treated G. eburina as the same species as Psora ligustica and published the combination Glyphopeltis ligustica.
