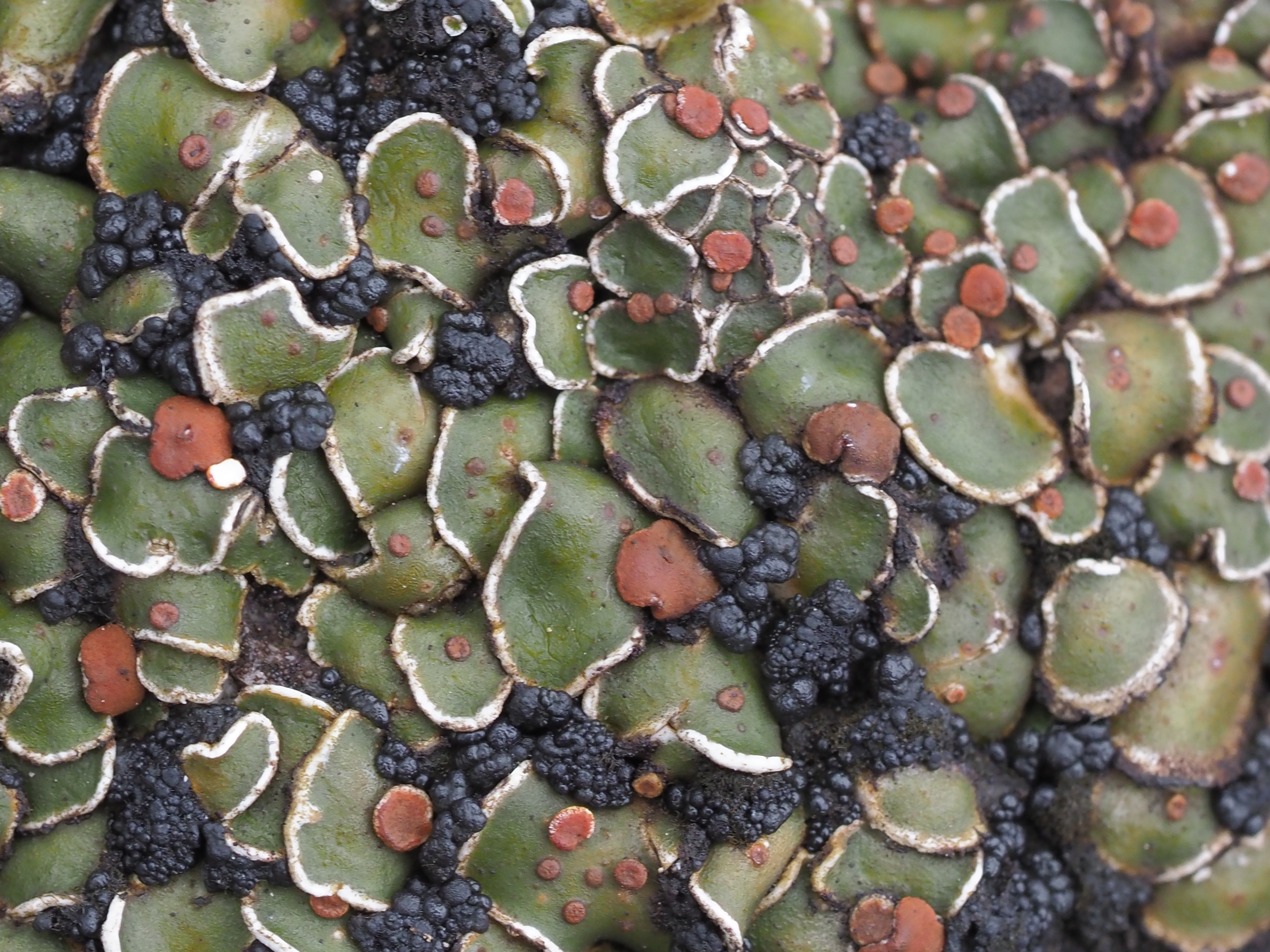

Conservation status
- Apparently Secure (NatureServe)

Scientific classification
- Kingdom: Fungi
- Division: Ascomycota
- Class: Lecanoromycetes
- Order: Lecanorales
- Family: Psoraceae
- Genus: Psora
- Species: P. pseudorussellii

Binomial name
- Psora pseudorussellii Timdal (1987)

= Psora pseudorussellii =

Species of lichen-forming fungus

Psora pseudorussellii, the bordered scale, is a species of rock-dwelling squamulose lichen in the family Psoraceae. It forms patches of small, brown, scale-like structures with distinctive white margins on limestone and other calcareous rocks in eastern and southern North America, from southeastern Canada south into Mexico. The species was described in 1986 to separate it from similar material that had been confused with Psora russellii, and DNA studies have confirmed that it is restricted to North America, with European and Asian specimens previously identified as this species actually representing different taxa.

== Taxonomy ==
Psora pseudorussellii was described as a new species by Einar Timdal in 1986, during his revision of North American Psora. In that treatment, Timdal separated it from material that had often been filed under Psora russellii, clarifying that two different taxa were being mixed under a single name in eastern North America.

The species is closely related to P. tuckermanii and can be difficult to tell from it in some collections. Timdal distinguished P. pseudorussellii by its generally smaller, darker brown squamules with a more distinctly white margin, and by its young apothecia, which tend to be more reddish brown, less strongly convex, and more clearly marginate. He also emphasized ecology: P. pseudorussellii is strictly saxicolous, while P. tuckermanii occurs on both rock and soil.

Molecular work published in 2025 supported Timdal's concept of Psora pseudorussellii and provided the first publicly available internal transcribed spacer (ITS) barcode sequences from North American material. The same study found that European collections previously identified as P. pseudorussellii represent a separate Mediterranean species, described as Psora mediterranea, and that sequences published as "P. cf. pseudorussellii" from China are better interpreted as P. himalayana. As a result, reports of P. pseudorussellii from outside North America should be treated with caution unless they are supported by modern revision work or DNA data.

== Description ==
The thallus is squamulose, forming scattered to contiguous patches. Squamules are up to about 4 mm across, usually more or less elongated, and are adnate to slightly ascending; they may become partly imbricate (overlapping). The upper surface is medium brown and dull to slightly shiny, with fissures often present; it may be epruinose or partly covered with white pruina. The squamule margin is white and straight to slightly upturned, remaining entire when young but often becoming somewhat lobed with age; the lower surface is white to pale brown. The common name "bordered scale" refers to this characteristic feature.

Internally, the upper cortex is relatively thick (about 90–140 μm) and contains abundant calcium oxalate, and the medulla is filled with calcium oxalate; the lower cortex is usually well developed. Apothecia are laminal, up to about 1.5 mm across, and are plane when young but may become strongly convex to hemispherical with age, sometimes losing a distinct margin. Ascospores are simple, about 8–12 × 5–7 μm; pycnidia were not observed. No lichen substances were detected in the thallus.

Psora russellii is similar in appearance, but can be distinguished by its rounder squamules that are depressed in the center, apothecia that are close to the edges of the squamules, and the presence of norstictic acid.

== Habitat and distribution ==
Psora pseudorussellii grows on calcareous rock, apparently mainly limestone. It is strictly saxicolous, occurring on exposed rock surfaces and outcrops rather than on soil.

In North America it is reported from southeastern Canada (including Ontario and Quebec) and across the eastern and southern United States, extending into northern Mexico (recorded from Coahuila). Reported elevations range from about 150 to 1,830 m (490 to 6,000 ft). A European collection previously reported under this name is now interpreted as the Mediterranean species Psora mediterranea. A 2025 study summarized the confirmed range of P. pseudorussellii as eastern and southern North America from Ontario and Quebec south into Mexico (reported as far as Oaxaca), and noted that reports from the southwestern United States (e.g., California) need confirmation.
