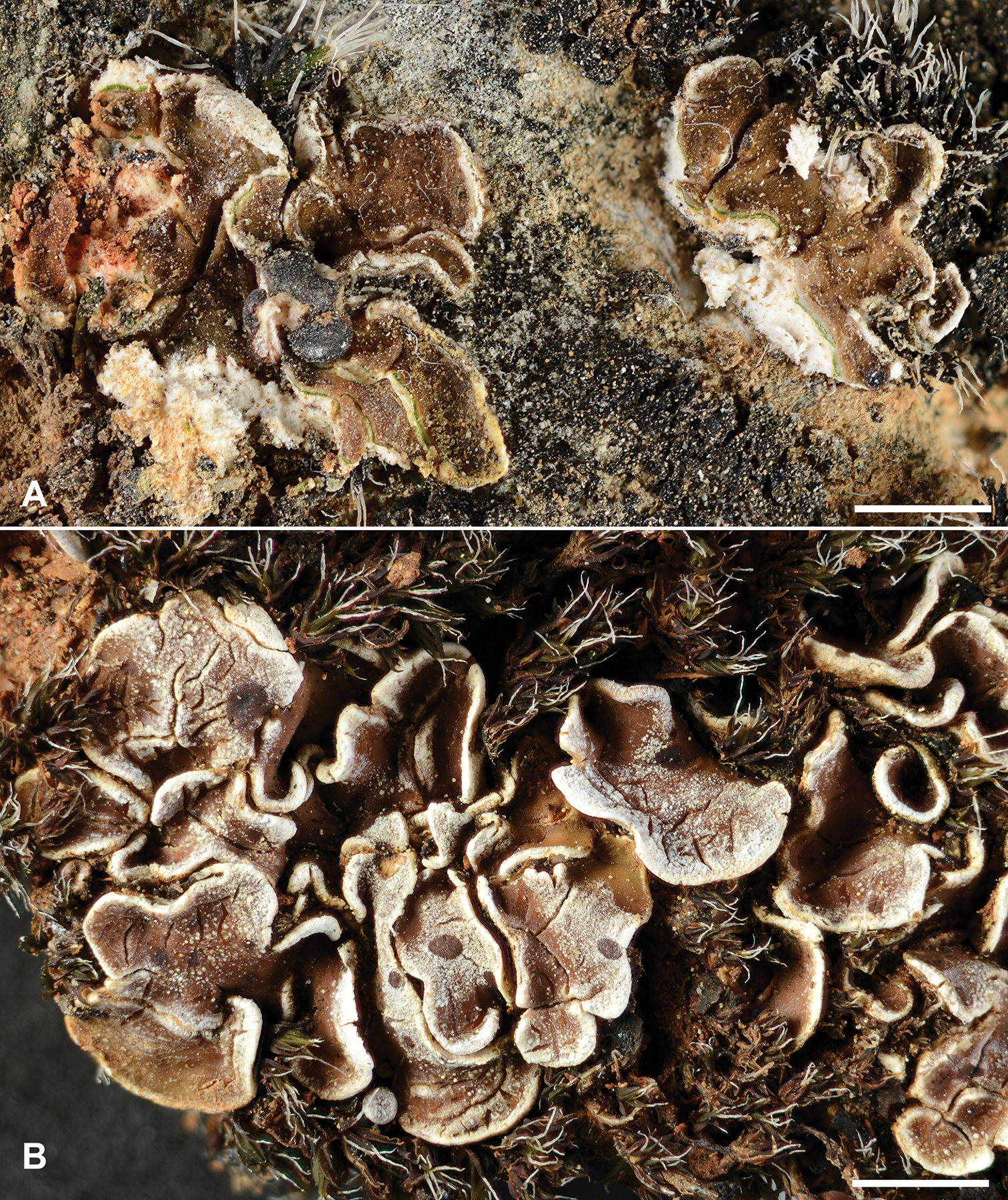

Scientific classification
- Kingdom: Fungi
- Division: Ascomycota
- Class: Lecanoromycetes
- Order: Lecanorales
- Family: Psoraceae
- Genus: Psora
- Species: P. taurensis

Binomial name
- Psora taurensis Timdal, Bendiksby, Kahraman & Halıcı (2017)

= Psora taurensis =

Species of lichen

Psora taurensis is a species of terricolous (ground-dwelling), squamulose lichen in the family Lecanoraceae. It is found in the Taurus Mountains of Turkey.

== Taxonomy ==
Psora taurensis was formally described as a new species in 2017 by Einar Timdal, Mika Bendiksby, Arife Merve Kahraman, and Mehmet Gökhan Halıcı. The type specimen was collected by Halıcı along the Gülnar-Silifke highway (near the exit to Kayrak) (Mersin Province); there, at an altitude between 1,000 and 1,020 m (3,280 and 3,350 ft), the lichen was found growing on soil over calcareous bedrock. The lichen's occurrence in the Taurus Mountains is alluded to in the species epithet taurensis. Molecular phylogenetic analysis shows that Psora tenuifolia is a sister species.

== Description ==
Psora taurensis has a squamulose thallus, with the individual squamules measuring up to 8 mm wide; the thallus develops concave lobes. The upper surface of the thallus is dull and brown, with pruina covering the outer part of the lobes. The lower thallus surface is white to pale brown. Apothecia are brownish-black, convex and lacking a distinct margin, with a diameter of up to 1.5 mm in diameter. The ascospores are ellipsoid and hyaline, measuring 11–16 by 5.5–7 μm.

Psora taurensis contains norstictic acid, a lichen product that can be detected using thin-layer chromatography. This substance is present as crystals in the medulla, along with crystals of calcium oxalate. The expected results of standard chemical spot tests on this species are medulla K+ (yellow turning red), C−, KC−, and P+ (orange).

== Habitat and distribution ==
Known to occur in Spain and two localities in Turkey, Psora taurensis appears to prefer a Mediterranean climate and elevations of about 1,000 m (3,300 ft). The habitats in Turkey include a rocky area with shrubland vegetation and an open pasture.
