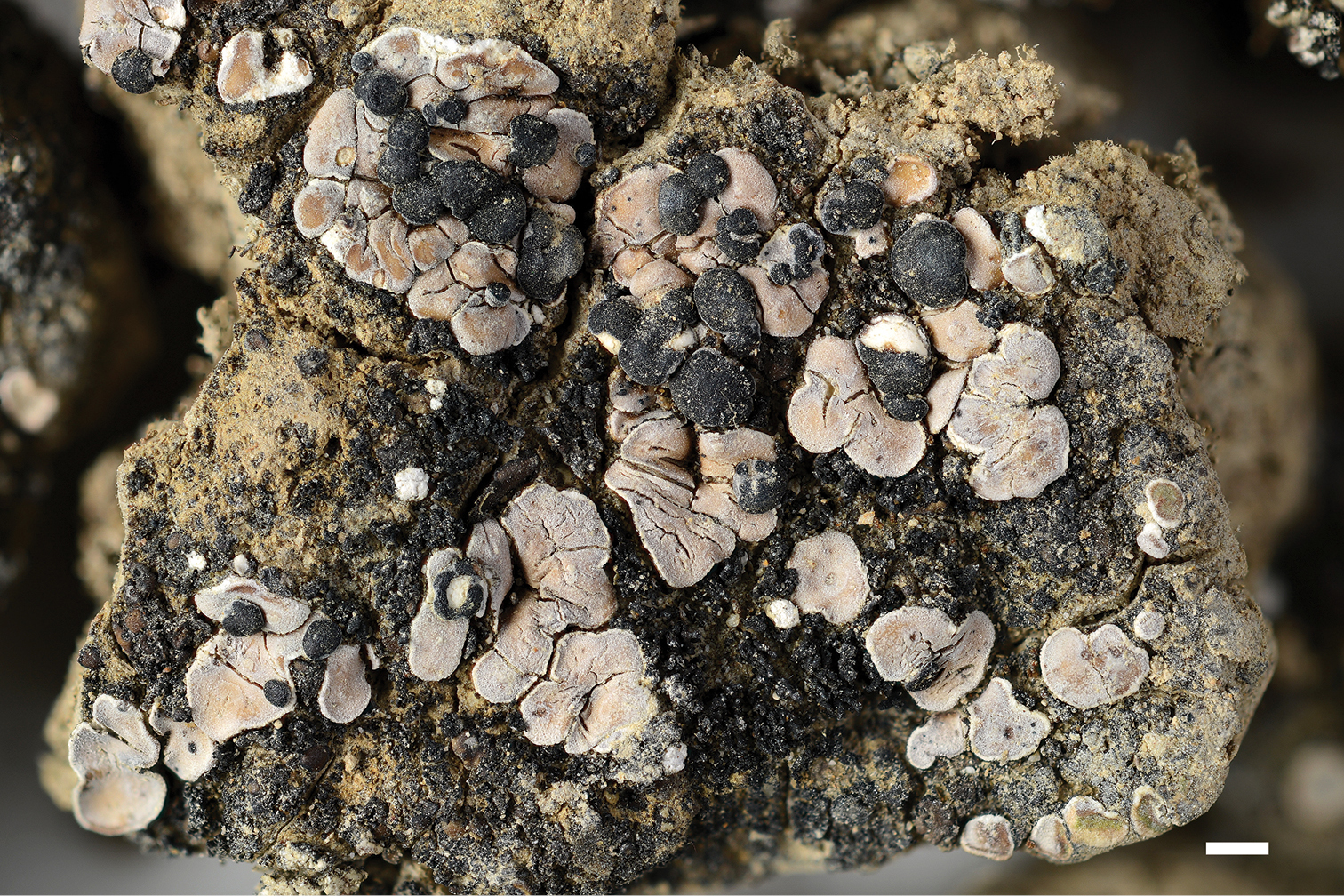
- part of holotype specimen

Scientific classification
- Domain: Eukaryota
- Kingdom: Fungi
- Division: Ascomycota
- Class: Lecanoromycetes
- Order: Lecanorales
- Family: Psoraceae
- Genus: Psora
- Species: P. altotibetica

Binomial name
- Psora altotibetica Timdal, Obermayer & Bendiksby (2016)

= Psora altotibetica =

Species of lichen

Psora altotibetica is a species of terricolous (ground-dwelling), squamulose lichen in the family Psoraceae. It occurs in the Tibetan region of China and in Nepal. The species bears a resemblance to Psora indigirkae but is genetically closer to Psora tenuifolia and Psora vallesiaca. It differs from the rest in certain features such as the colour of its apothecia, size of ascospores, and secondary chemical composition. The lichen's habitat is in the alpine zones of the Great Himalayas at altitudes between 4,230 and 5,000 m (13,880 and 16,400 ft).

== Taxonomy ==
Psora altotibetica was first discovered by one of the researchers during a visit to the herbarium of Institut für Pflanzenwissenschaften ("Institute of Plant Sciences"), University of Graz in 1992. Further specimens collected from the Tibetan region supported the identification of this new species. After detailed study and DNA analysis, it was officially described as Psora altotibetica in 2016 by lichenologists Einar Timdal, Walter Obermayer, and Mika Bendiksby. The species was named after the region in which it was predominantly found, with altotibetica referring to 'high Tibet'.

The type specimen was collected from a small village in the Himalayan range, Xizang, China.

=== Phylogeny ===
Phylogenetically, Psora altotibetica is closely related to Psora tenuifolia and Psora vallesiaca, even though it more closely resembles Psora indigirkae in its morphology. Psora tenuifolia and Psora vallesiaca were previously unknown in China and the Himalayas, but are now recognised as new to these regions.

The species' relationship with Psora tenuifolia and Psora vallesiaca, as well as its distinction from other Psora species, has been determined through the analysis of DNA sequences, morphological attributes, and secondary chemistry.

== Description ==
Psora altotibetica is squamulose (bearing small, scale-like projections). It shares several characteristics with other species within the Psora genus, such as an upper cortex containing remnants of algae, and a hypothecium with calcium oxalate crystals. However, Psora altotibetica is distinguished by several unique traits. It has a black apothecia, ascospores measuring 9–14 by 5–7 μm, and a secondary chemistry that lacks bourgeanic acid—a feature that sets it apart from Psora indigirkae.

A key chemical characteristic of Psora altotibetica is the presence of gyrophoric acid, with all tested specimens showing this compound.

== Habitat and distribution ==
The species thrives on soil in the alpine zone of the Great Himalayas, specifically between the altitudes of 4,230 and 5,000 m (13,880 and 16,400 ft). Psora altotibetica was identified in nine different localities across China (Tibetan area) and Nepal.

== Similar species ==
While Psora altotibetica is most similar to Psora indigirkae in appearance, it has a few critical distinctions. Psora indigirkae has brown apothecia, often with a reddish hue, larger ascospores, and its secondary chemistry includes both gyrophoric and bourgeanic acid.

The other Psora species known from the Himalayas, Psora decipiens, differs by having more regularly rounded squamules, strictly marginal apothecia, and a chemistry usually devoid of lichen substances or, in rare cases, containing norstictic acid.
