= Peltula polyphylla =

Scientific classification
- Kingdom: Fungi
- Division: Ascomycota
- Class: Lichinomycetes
- Order: Lichinales
- Family: Peltulaceae
- Genus: Peltula
- Species: P. polyphylla

Binomial name
- Peltula polyphylla Q.X.Yang & X.L.Wei (2022)
- Holotype: Bamuyan village, Beijing

Species of lichen

Peltula polyphylla is a ground-dwelling, squamulose lichen species in the family Peltulaceae, characterised by its distinctive multi-lobed (polyphyllous) structure. Found in China, it was described as a new species in 2022.

== Taxonomy ==
The species was introduced to science in 2022 by Qiuxia Yang and Xinli Wei, based on a specimen collected in Beijing, China. The specific epithet polyphylla, derived from the Greek words poly, meaning 'many', and phyllon, meaning 'leaf', reflect the multiple small lobes that characterise the thallus of this species. The holotype was collected in the Bamuyan village, behind Xishanhong Inn in Mentougou District, Beijing.

== Description ==
The thallus of Peltula polyphylla is terricolous, meaning it grows on the ground, and is polyphyllous, consisting of many small lobes each up to 0.9 mm in diameter. These lobes are concave with slightly to deeply lobed, wavy margins that are darker in colour. The upper surface is olive-brown to olive-black and lacks a powdery covering (epruinose), while the lower surface is smooth and pale yellowish-brown, attaching to the substrate with a robust cluster of root-like structures (umbilici).

The thallus measures 550 micrometres (μm) thick, with individual lobes ranging from 130 to 211 μm. It lacks a developed upper cortex but includes a yellowish protective top layer (epinecral layer) that is 5 μm thick. The algal layer, containing the photosynthetic partner, is quite dense, filling almost the entire middle layer (medulla) of the lichen. The medulla is made up of loosely interwoven fungal hyphae and spherical cells.

Reproductive structures are infrequent, with each lobe typically bearing a single apothecium that is up to 0.55 mm in diameter. These fruiting bodies are flush with the thallus surface and have a colour that blends with the surrounding thallus. The hymenium, or spore-producing layer, turns wine red when treated with iodine, while the supporting structure below it (subhymenium) turns blue with potassium hydroxide treatment. Ascospores are clear, spherical, and simple in structure.

== Habitat and distribution ==
Peltula polyphylla is found on sun-exposed rocks that are thinly covered with soil. It coexists with related species such as Peltula euploca and Peltula placodizans but is currently known only from its type locality in China.
