= Peltula lobulata =

Scientific classification
- Kingdom: Fungi
- Division: Ascomycota
- Class: Lichinomycetes
- Order: Lichinales
- Family: Peltulaceae
- Genus: Peltula
- Species: P. lobulata

Binomial name
- Peltula lobulata Q.X.Yang & X.L.Wei (2022)
- Holotype: Mangshan National Forest Park, Beijing

Species of lichen

Peltula lobulata is a species of saxicolous (rock-dwelling), squamulose lichen that belongs to the family Peltulaceae. This species was first described in 2019 following its discovery in Beijing, China.

== Taxonomy ==
Peltula lobulata was formally described as a new species in 2019 by Qiuxia Yang and Xinli Wei. Its species epithet, lobulata, derived from Latin, refers to the numerous small lobes, or lobules, present on the lichen's body. The holotype, the specimen used for the original description, was collected in Mangshan National Forest Park, Beijing.

== Description ==
The Peltula lobulata has a thallus that is scale-like (squamulose) in forms, and grows up to 2.5 mm in diameter. The thallus is irregularly rounded, ranging from convex to flat, with many small lobules that become apparent as it matures. The edges of the thallus are curled downwards and lobed, lighter in colour than the rest of the body. The upper surface is dark olive-green, uneven in colour, and rough (rugose), sometimes showing cracks, without any powdery or granular cover (epruinose). The lower surface is matt, nearly black, and tightly adheres to the substrate with a central, short attachment point (umbilicus).

The thallus thickness ranges from 185 to 300 micrometres (μm), with lobules up to 125 μm thick. Unlike many lichens, the upper cortex is not fully developed but includes a yellowish outer layer (epinecral layer) 5 μm thick. The layer containing the photosynthetic partner (algal layer), which is made up of cyanobacteria, is 56–105 μm thick. The inner layer (medulla) is composed of loosely interwoven fungal filaments (hyphae) and round cells, while the lower cortex is tightly packed (paraplectenchymatous) and about 30 μm thick.

Reproductive structures (apothecia) are rare, small, and embed within the thallus, with 1–2 typically found per scale of the thallus. The epihymenium is yellow-brown. The spore-producing sacs (asci) are club-shaped, containing more than 60 spores each, and the spores are clear (hyaline), lack septa, and measure 5.5–8.3 by 2.7–3.8 μm.

== Habitat and distribution ==
Peltula lobulata is found growing on sun-exposed red shale and grey sandstone along roadsides at low mountain altitudes. At the time of its publication, it was known only from its type locality in China and tends to grow isolated from other species.
