= Eremastrella =

Scientific classification
- Domain: Eukaryota
- Kingdom: Fungi
- Division: Ascomycota
- Class: Lecanoromycetes
- Order: Lecanorales
- Family: Psoraceae
- Genus: Eremastrella; S.Vogel (1955)

Type species
- Eremastrella tobleri S.Vogel (1955)

Species
- E. montana E. tobleri

Genus of fungi

Eremastrella is a genus of lichen in the family Psoraceae. The genus was circumscribed by the lichenologist Stefan Vogel in 1955, with Eremastrella tobleri assigned as the type species.

== Species ==
- Eremastrella montana Brusse (1987) – South Africa
- Eremastrella tobleri S.Vogel (1955)

The species once named Eremastrella crystallifera (Taylor) Gotth.Schneid. (1980) is now known as Psora crystallifera.
