= Peltula pseudoboletiformis =

Scientific classification
- Kingdom: Fungi
- Division: Ascomycota
- Class: Lichinomycetes
- Order: Lichinales
- Family: Peltulaceae
- Genus: Peltula
- Species: P. pseudoboletiformis

Binomial name
- Peltula pseudoboletiformis Q.X.Yang & X.L.Wei (2022)
- Holotype: Bamuyan village, Beijing

Species of lichen

Peltula pseudoboletiformis is a species of saxicolous (rock-dwelling), squamulose lichen in the family Peltulaceae, described in 2022. It is noted for its resemblance in thallus structure to the mushroom-forming fungal genus Boletus, which is reflected in its name.

== Taxonomy ==
The species Peltula pseudoboletiformis was formally described by Qiuxia Yang and Xinli Wei in 2022, with the species epithet pseudoboletiformis suggesting its similarity to Peltula boletiformis but with distinct genetic and morphological differences. The holotype was collected in Bamuyan village, Beijing, China.

== Description ==
The thallus of Peltula pseudoboletiformis is squamulose to somewhat fruticose, loosely or tightly clustered, and grows up to 1.5 mm in diameter and 2 mm in height. It features a stalk that is typically 0.9 mm long, twisted, and coloured orange to tan. The lobes of the thallus are circular, elliptical, or irregularly angular, with a nearly flat top and smooth, dark olive-green upper surface. The thallus attaches to the rock via an umbilicus and lacks both isidia and soredia, reproductive propagules found in some lichens.

The lobes are 350–600 micrometres thick with a thin, yellowish protective layer on top and a more robust algal layer below, housing the photosynthetic partner. The medulla, or inner layer, contains loosely interwoven hyphae and large air-filled cavities.

Reproductive features include apothecia, which are spore-producing structures, occurring one or two per squamule and immersed within the thallus. These apothecia have a yellowish epihymenium and a hymenium that produce a wine red colour reacting to iodine staining. The spore-producing sacs (asci) contain numerous hyaline (colourless and transparent), ellipsoid spores.

== Habitat and distribution ==
Peltula pseudoboletiformis typically grows on calcareous rocks that are exposed to the sun, particularly within grooves where rainwater and soil may accumulate. At the time of its original publication, it was known only from its type locality in China.
