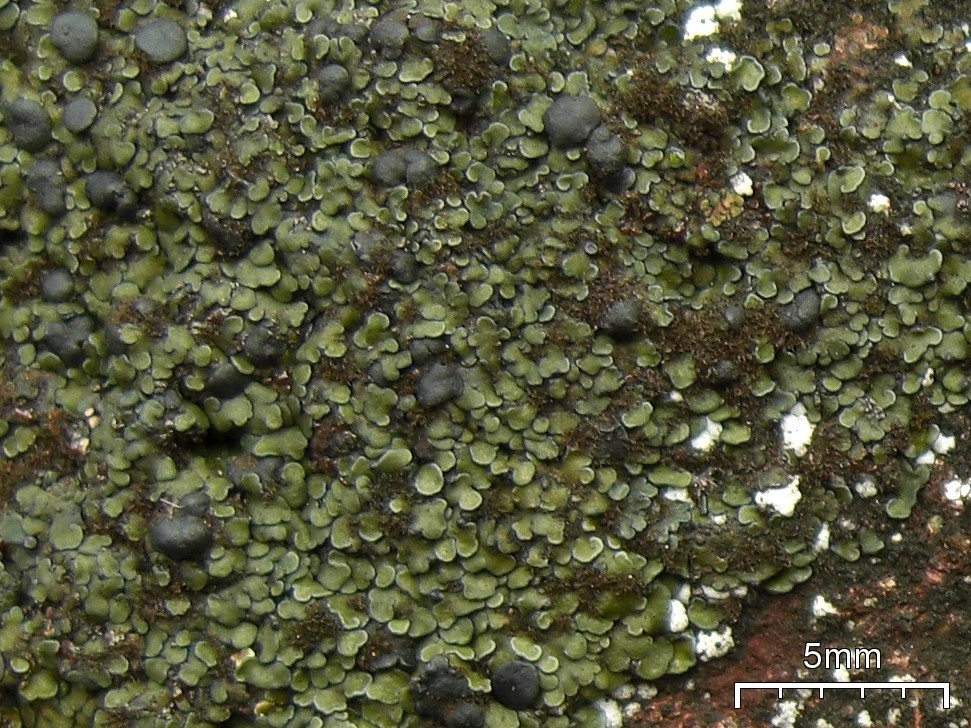
- Psorula rufonigra (with Spilonema revertens)

Scientific classification
- Domain: Eukaryota
- Kingdom: Fungi
- Division: Ascomycota
- Class: Lecanoromycetes
- Order: Lecanorales
- Family: Psoraceae
- Genus: Psorula; Gotth.Schneid. (1980)
- Species: P. rufonigra

Binomial name
- Psorula rufonigra (Tuck.) Gotth.Schneid. (1980)

= Psorula =

Single-species genus of lichen

Psorula is a fungal genus in the family Psoraceae. It is a monotypic genus, containing the single lichen species Psorula rufonigra. The genus was circumscribed by German lichenologist Gotthard Schneider in 1980.
