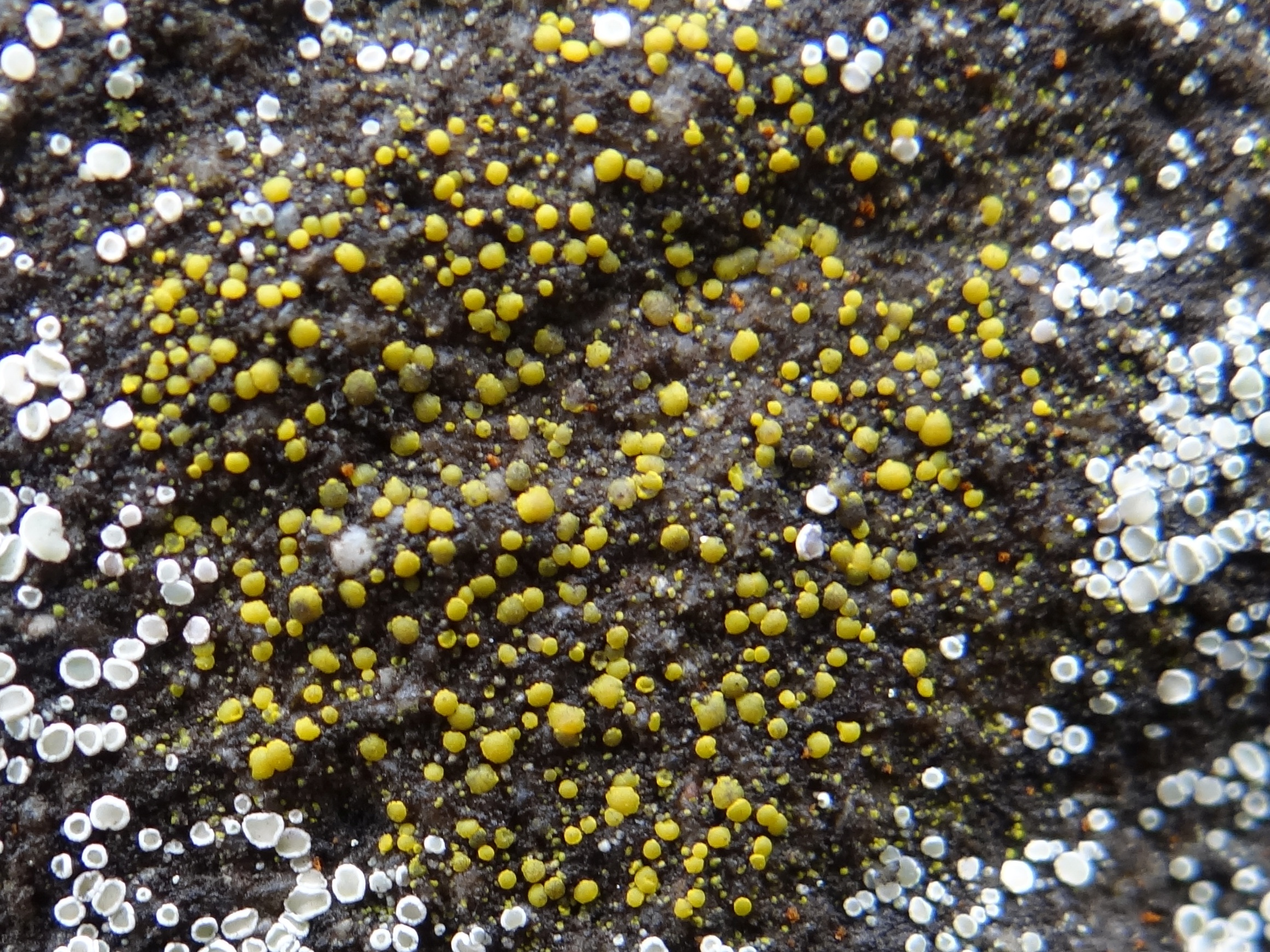
- Protoblastenia rupestris, Poland

Scientific classification
- Kingdom: Fungi
- Division: Ascomycota
- Class: Lecanoromycetes
- Order: Lecanorales
- Family: Psoraceae
- Genus: Protoblastenia (Zahlbr.) J.Steiner (1911)

Type species
- Protoblastenia rupestris (Scop.) J.Steiner (1911)

Synonyms
- Blastenia sect. Protoblastenia Zahlbr. (1908); Blasteniomyces Cif. & Tomas. (1953); Oolithinia M.Choisy & Werner (1932)

= Protoblastenia =

Genus of lichen-forming fungi

Protoblastenia is a genus of lichens in the family Psoraceae. It was originally circumscribed by Alexander Zahlbruckner in 1908 as a section of genus Blastenia. J. Steiner promoted it to generic status in 1911.

== Taxonomy and diversity ==
A 2025 revision of Finnish Protoblastenia, based on morphology and nuclear ITS rDNA sequences, showed that the genus is more diverse than had previously been recognised. The study accepted 20 species in Finland, including 16 species newly described there: P. arupii, P. borealis, P. compressa, P. dolomitica, P. ekmanii, P. fennoarctica, P. minuta, P. oulankaensis, P. pseudocompressa, P. pseudoterricola, P. remota, P. rikkinenii, P. saanaensis, P. timdalii, P. violacea, and P. westbergii. Many of these taxa were found to be semi-cryptic, with only slight average morphological differences between species, so some specimens cannot be identified reliably without molecular data.

Most species of Protoblastenia grow on calcareous rock, although P. terricola also occurs on calcareous soil. Species in the genus typically have anthraquinones in the apothecia, which usually give the discs an orange colour, along with convex apothecia and pale, non-septate spores. Protoblastenia differs from the related genus Psora in its absent or weakly developed upper cortex and in the lack of calcium oxalate crystals in the hypothecium. Molecular studies have supported the monophyly of the genus, and the Finnish revision found ITS barcoding useful for distinguishing species within Protoblastenia.

In Finland, the calcareous fells of Enontekiö in the northwest were identified as a particular centre of diversity for the genus. Nine of the newly described species were known there alone in Finland. The study also linked P. rikkinenii to material from Norway and P. oulankaensis to material from Italy, suggesting that the diversity of the genus has probably been underestimated in northern and central Europe.

== Species ==
Species treated in the genus include:

- Protoblastenia arupii Pykälä & Myllys (2025)
- Protoblastenia aurata Poelt & Vězda (1969)
- Protoblastenia borealis Pykälä & Myllys (2025)
- Protoblastenia calva (Dicks.) Zahlbr. (1930)
- Protoblastenia calvella Kainz & Rambold (2004)
- Protoblastenia compressa Pykälä & Myllys (2025)
- Protoblastenia coniasis (A.Massal.) Poelt (1957)
- Protoblastenia cyclospora (Hepp ex Körb.) Poelt (1975)
- Protoblastenia dolomitica Pykälä & Myllys (2025)
- Protoblastenia ekmanii Pykälä & Myllys (2025)
- Protoblastenia fennoarctica Pykälä & Myllys (2025)
- Protoblastenia geitleri Zahlbr. (1936)
- Protoblastenia incrustans (DC.) J.Steiner (1915)
- Protoblastenia laeta (Poelt) Kainz & Rambold (2004)
- Protoblastenia lilacina Poelt & Vězda (1970)
- Protoblastenia minuta Pykälä & Myllys (2025)
- Protoblastenia oulankaensis Pykälä & Myllys (2025)
- Protoblastenia pseudocompressa Pykälä & Myllys (2025)
- Protoblastenia pseudoterricola Pykälä & Myllys (2025)
- Protoblastenia remota Pykälä & Myllys (2025)
- Protoblastenia rikkinenii Pykälä & Myllys (2025)
- Protoblastenia rupestris (Scop.) J.Steiner (1911)
- Protoblastenia saanaensis Pykälä & Myllys (2025)
- Protoblastenia siebenhaariana (Körb.) J.Steiner (1911)
- Protoblastenia szaferi J.Nowak (1974)
- Protoblastenia terricola (Anzi) Lynge (1928)
- Protoblastenia timdalii Pykälä & Myllys (2025)
- Protoblastenia violacea Pykälä & Myllys (2025)
- Protoblastenia westbergii Pykälä & Myllys (2025)
