= Protomicarea =

Scientific classification
- Kingdom: Fungi
- Division: Ascomycota
- Class: Lecanoromycetes
- Order: Lecanorales
- Family: Psoraceae
- Genus: Protomicarea; Hafellner (2001)

Type species
- Protomicarea limosa (Ach.) Hafellner (2001)

Species
- P. limosa P. alpestris

Genus of lichens

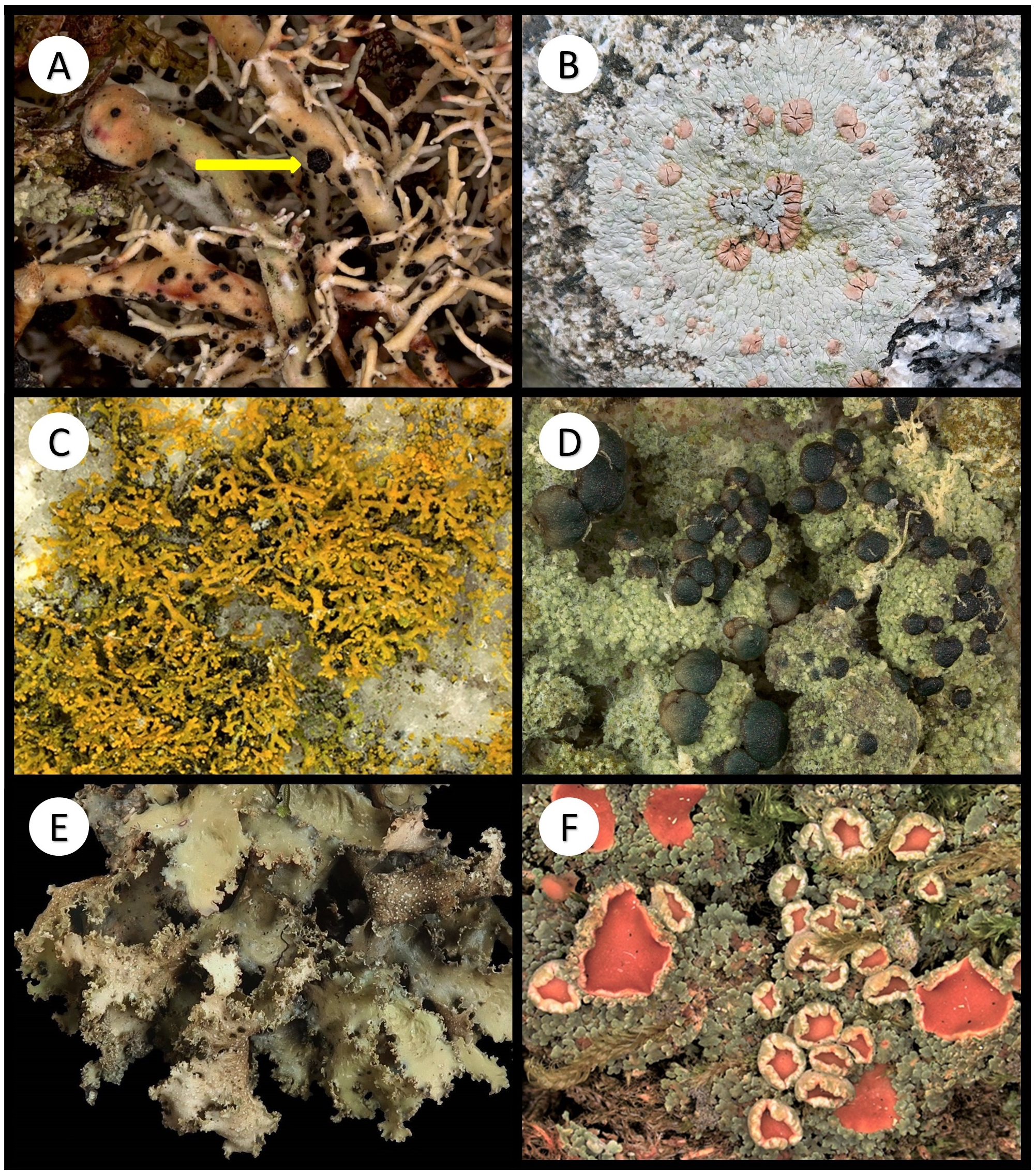
Lichens of Calvert Island. D. Protomicarea limosa, McMullin 19698 (CANL).

Protomicarea is a genus of lichen-forming fungi in the family Psoraceae. The genus contains two species: Protomicarea limosa (the type) and Protomicarea alpestris. Protomicarea was circumscribed by lichenologist Josef Hafellner in 2001.

== Species ==
- Protomicarea alpestris (Sommerf.) McCune (2018)
- Protomicarea limosa (Ach.) Hafellner (2001)
