= Peltula polycarpa =

Scientific classification
- Kingdom: Fungi
- Division: Ascomycota
- Class: Lichinomycetes
- Order: Lichinales
- Family: Peltulaceae
- Genus: Peltula
- Species: P. polycarpa

Binomial name
- Peltula polycarpa Q.X.Yang & X.L.Wei (2022)
- Holotype: Baihuashan National Nature Reserve, Beijing

Species of lichen

Peltula polycarpa is a species of saxicolous (rock-dwelling), squamulose lichen in the family Peltulaceae. First described in 2022, it is endemic to Beijing's Mentougou District in China.

== Taxonomy ==
The species Peltula polycarpa was formally identified and named in 2022 by Qiuxia Yang and Xinli Wei. The species epithet polycarpa is derived from the Greek words for 'many' and 'fruit', referring to the abundance of apothecia, which are a type of fruiting body found on the lichen. The holotype was collected in the Baihuashan National Nature Reserve in Beijing's Mentougou District, at an elevation of 1,120 m (3,670 ft).

== Description ==
The thallus of Peltula polycarpa is squamulose (scaly) with individual scales up to 5 mm in diameter or stretches to 6.8 mm long and 4.7 mm wide. Initially, it appears as single, pale yellow, tongue-shaped scales attached laterally to the substrate, often maturing into multiple lobes from either the same or different attachment points. Mature lobes are convex and deeply curved with their margins typically obscured unless viewed from underneath, showing either smooth or slightly lobed edges.

The upper surface is bright olive-green with an olive-brown base and is not covered in a powdery coating (epruinose), while the lower surface is smooth, ranging from bright yellow to yellowish-brown. The thallus structure comprises a thin yellowish layer just under the surface (epinecral layer), a layer of clustered algae cells, a loosely woven middle layer (medulla) of fungal hyphae, and a densely packed lower layer (cortex) of large cells.

Reproductive features include numerous apothecia that cover the upper surface, starting as small dots and enlarging to up to 0.48 mm with a pale yellow or body-coloured rim. The internal tissue of the apothecia (hymenium) is wine red when treated with iodine, and the spore-producing sacs (asci) are club-shaped, containing over 100 spores each.

== Habitat and distribution ==
Peltula polycarpa grows on granite surfaces that are periodically moistened by water, such as those found alongside mountain roads. It shares its habitat with various weeds, mosses, and other lichens and is currently known only within its discovery area in China.
