= Peltula submarginata =

Scientific classification
- Kingdom: Fungi
- Division: Ascomycota
- Class: Lichinomycetes
- Order: Lichinales
- Family: Peltulaceae
- Genus: Peltula
- Species: P. submarginata

Binomial name
- Peltula submarginata Q.X.Yang & X.L.Wei (2022)
- Holotype: Dayangshan National Forest Park, Beijing

Species of lichen

Peltula submarginata is a species of saxicolous (rock-dwelling), squamulose lichen in the family Peltulaceae, first described in 2022. It occurs in China.

== Taxonomy ==
Peltula submarginata was formally identified and named by Qiuxia Yang and Xinli Wei in 2022. Its species epithet suggests a close morphological similarity to Peltula marginata but with distinct differences noted in its physical and reproductive structures. The holotype was collected in Beijing's Dayangshan National Forest Park at an elevation of 390 m (1,280 ft), where it was found growing on soil on the surface of a rock.

== Description ==
The thallus of Peltula submarginata is saxicolous, meaning it grows on rocks, and has a squamulose-subfruticose form—appearing scale-like initially and developing a stalk or umbilicus-like attachment to the substrate. Lobes of the thallus are circular to elliptical, up to 2 mm in diameter, with a top that is almost flattened. The margin is entire, and the upper surface is yellowish olive with a black-brown border, smooth, and lacks a powdery covering (epruinose).

The thallus thickness ranges between 230 and 370 micrometres (μm), without a developed cortex but featuring a protective yellowish epinecral layer. The algal layer is substantial, encircling the perimeter of the squamules, and the medulla contains sparse hyphae with significant hollow areas, providing structure and perhaps nutrient storage.

Reproductive structures include apothecia (fruiting bodies), numbering 1 to 7 per lobe, immersed within the thallus and black when mature. The hymenium, or spore-producing layer, is light yellow and up to 215 μm tall, with spores being released through asci that are clavate to obclavate in shape and contain more than 100 spores each.

== Habitat and distribution ==
Peltula submarginata is typically found on sun-exposed sandstone faces, predominantly in areas where other lichens are absent, suggesting a specific ecological niche. At the time of its original publication, it was only known to occur in its type locality in China.
