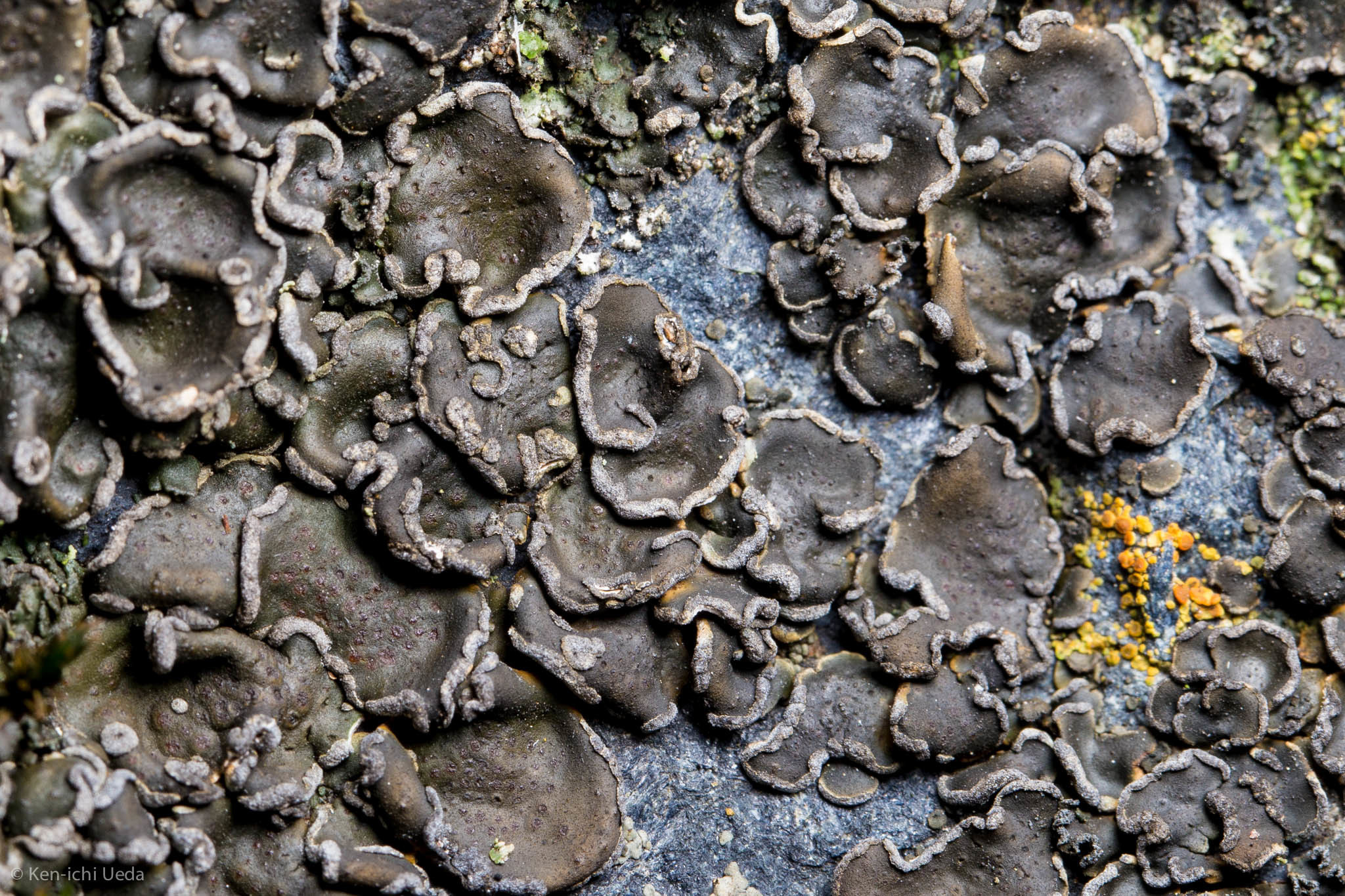
- Peltula euploca

Scientific classification
- Kingdom: Fungi
- Division: Ascomycota
- Class: Lichinomycetes
- Order: Lichinales
- Family: Peltulaceae; Büdel (1986)
- Genus: Peltula; Nyl. (1853)

Type species
- Peltula radicata Nyl. (1853)

Synonyms
- Neoheppia Zahlbr. (1909); Corynecystis Brusse (1985); Phyllopeltula Kalb (2001)

= Peltula =

Genus of lichen-forming fungi

Peltula is a genus of small dark brown to olive or dark grey squamulose lichens. These lichens typically grow on rocks in arid and semi-arid environments worldwide. They consist of a fungus living in symbiosis with a photosynthetic partner, specifically a cyanobacterium of the genus Chroococcidiopsis. Peltula is the only genus in the family Peltulaceae, which belongs to the Lichinomycetes, a class of fungi that form lichens. The genus includes about 50 recognised species, which have a variety of growth forms ranging from flat and crust-like to more complex, leaf-like structures. Peltula lichens play important ecological roles in harsh environments, contributing to soil stability and nutrient cycling.

To cope with their challenging habitats, Peltula species have evolved various adaptations. These include specialised protective layers and the ability to withstand both drought and flooding. The thalli of Peltula lichens are typically small, with a stratified structure consisting of an upper epinecral layer, a photobiont layer, a medulla, and usually a lower cortex. Peltulaceae generally lack secondary metabolites, which distinguishes them from many other lichen families. The genus has a cosmopolitan distribution, with members found across various continents, occupying diverse substrates including rocks, soil, and occasionally tree bark. Molecular phylogenetics studies have significantly altered the classification of these lichens. Formerly separate genera are now incorporated into Peltula, rendering Peltulaceae a monogeneric family.

== Systematics ==
=== Historical taxonomy ===
Genus Peltula was circumscribed by the Finnish lichenologist William Nylander in 1853. He assigned the desert soil lichen Peltula radicata as the type, and at that time, only species. In his original description of Peltula radicata, Nylander characterised it as having a rust-brown, peltate thallus measuring at least 3 mm wide, with an irregularly and sparsely grooved surface. He noted that the thallus had a centrally depressed, umbilicate attachment, fixed to the substrate by a few pale, long, and strong rhizines. Nylander described the apothecia as disc-shaped and the same colour as the thallus, initially almost endocarpoid, but expanding significantly with age and featuring a depressed thalline margin. He observed that the asci contained numerous spores, 8–48 or possibly more. The type (biology) was found growing on sandy soil near Biskra, Algeria, alongside Lecanora endocarpa. In establishing the new genus Peltula, he distinguished it from other Lecanorine genera by its thallus being attached below with long, central rhizines. In 1890, Vainio proposed that Peltula should be considered a section of the genus Heppia rather than an independent genus.

For decades, the genus Peltula saw limited use. Many species now classified under Peltula were previously placed in Heppia. Vilmos Kőfaragó-Gyelnik added some species to Peltula in 1935. The family was Peltulaceae proposed by the German lichenologist Burkhard Büdel in 1986. He identified four types of growth morphologies in the family: leaf-like, squamulose, crustose and fruticose. The genera Phyllopeltula and Neoheppia were created as segregates of Peltula to contain species with differences in their cortex morphology and substratum. Neoheppia was introduced by Alexander Zahlbruckner in 1909 for N. brasiliensis, which had a crustose thallus attached to its substrate by all parts of its lower surface. Phyllopeltula differed from the typical Peltula morphology with subfoliose-compound thalli. These genera were included as part of the Peltulaceae.

=== Phylogenetics ===
- - - - - - - - - - - - - - - P. cylindrica
                            - P. santessonii
                          - P. zahlbruckner
                        - P. placodizans
                      - - P. clavata
                        - P. lingulata
                    - - P. marginata
                      - P. tortuosa
                  - - - P. auriculata
                      - P. obscurans var. deserticola
                    - - P. congregata
                      - P. umbilicata
                - - - - - P. coriacea
                        - P. rodriguesii
                      - - P. farinosa
                        - Neoheppia brasiliensis
                    - - P. leptophylla
                      - Phyllopeltula corticola
                  - P. obscurans var. deserticola
              - P. impressa
            - - - P. crispatula
                - P. obscurans var. hassei
              - P. michoacanensis
          - - - P. imbricata
              - P. inversa
            - P. capensis
        - - P. boletiformis
          - Neoheppia cataractae
      - - - - - P. euploca
              - P. omphaliza
            - P. sonorensis
          - P. bolanderi
        - - - - P. psammophila
              - P. radicata
            - P. patellata
          - P. richardsii
    - - P. africana
      - P. obscuratula
  - Lichinella

Cladogram showing the phylogeny of some species in the family Peltulaceae, based on analysis by Kauff et al. in 2018.

Egea (1989) and Büdel (1987) made early attempts to establish phylogenetic lineages within Peltula based on morphology. Egea identified two major evolutionary lineages based primarily on substratum fixation, while Büdel described two groups of closely related species based on thallus morphology. However, these classification attempts remained controversial due to the morphological variability within the genus.

Early molecular phylogenetics work (2001) showed that the family was monophyletic. More recent molecular studies have led to a significant revision of the family's taxonomy. A comprehensive study by Kauff and colleagues (2018) analysed six genetic loci from 37 of the 47 species classified within Peltulaceae at the time. The results of this analysis revealed that Phyllopeltula and Neoheppia are not monophyletic and are nested within the genus Peltula. As a consequence of these findings, Phyllopeltula and Neoheppia have been subsumed into Peltula, making Peltulaceae a monogeneric (single-genus) family. The family now includes about 50 recognised species, all within the genus Peltula. The study also highlighted challenges in species delimitation within Peltula. Traditional morphological characters, such as growth forms and thallus anatomy, which were previously used to delimit genera and species within the family, have been shown to be unreliable indicators of phylogenetic relationships. Significant differences in thallus shape and structure were seen within several species, further complicating classification efforts based on morphology alone.

=== Naming ===
The genus name is derived from the Latin pelta, 'small shield', alluding to the shape of the squamules. In North America, the colloquial name "rock olives" refers to members of this genus, alluding to both their colour and typical substrate. Several North American species with common names include the cylindrical, powdery, common, stuffed, and giant rock-olives.

== Description ==
Peltulaceae members have a diverse range of thallus morphologies. Thalli are typically small, ranging from minute squamules to larger compound structures. Most species possess a stratified (heteromerous) thallus structure, consisting of an upper epinecral layer, a photobiont layer, a medulla, and usually a distinct lower cortex. The epinecral layer, often yellowish to brown, provides protection and its development is influenced by light intensity. The medulla in many species contains air spaces of various sizes, while some taxa lack a lower cortex or medullary cavities.

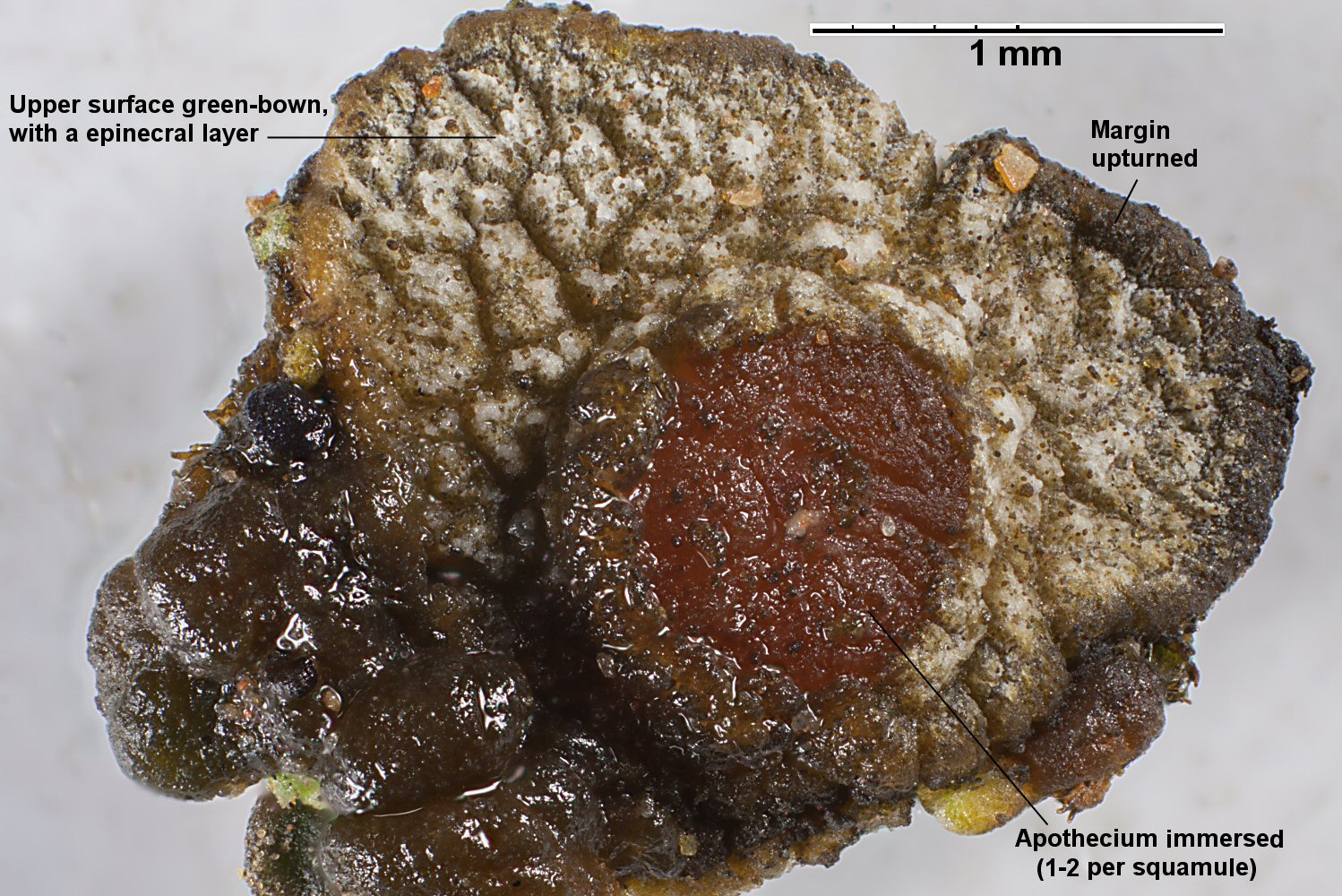
Closeup of a squamule of Peltula patellata

The growth forms of Peltulaceae can be categorised into six types based on morphology and anatomy. Peltate-umbilicate forms are often singular thalli, rarely compound, attached by an umbilicus or central strand of hyphae. Squamulose-semifruticose forms are characterised by large medullary cavities. Squamulose-compound forms are rarely singular. Subfoliose, compound forms lack medullary cavities and a lower cortex. Crustose-areolate forms have no medullary cavities or lower cortex, but possess a deeply penetrating cyanobiont layer. Finally, a unique crustose form is found in P. inversa, which exhibits an inverse thallus anatomy.

Peltulaceae are exclusively associated with unicellular cyanobacterial photobionts, predominantly of the genus Chroococcidiopsis. Apothecia are common in most species, with a few exceptions, and they are zeorine in form and typically immersed in the thallus. The family is characterised by uniform reproductive structures across all species, including polysporous asci with a distinctive gelatinous sheath, and simple, single-celled, colourless spores. The ascospores range in shape from more or less spherical, to ellipsoidal, to bacilliform, and measure 3–12 by 2–6 μm. The asci are unitunicate-rostrate, which means have they a single-layered wall with a beak-like tip. Pycnidia, conidiophores, and pycnospores are also consistent in structure throughout the family; the conidia are hyaline, oval to fusiform in shape, and have dimensions of 1.5–4.3 by 0.5–2.5 μm. Vegetative reproductive structures such as soredia and isidia occur in a small number of species.

Unlike many other lichen families, Peltulaceae generally lack secondary metabolites (lichen products). An exception is Peltula langei, which produces a yellow pigment similar to myeloconon C. The thallus structure of Peltulaceae species shows various adaptations to their predominantly arid and semi-arid habitats. The epinecral layer shields the photobiont from intense sunlight, while different growth forms are associated with varying water availability. Some species, particularly those with squamulose to semifruticose thalli and large medullary cavities, are adapted to temporarily inundated habitats. These morphological and anatomical features allow members of the family to grow in a range of ecological niches from desert rocks to occasionally submerged surfaces.

== Habitat, distribution, and ecology ==
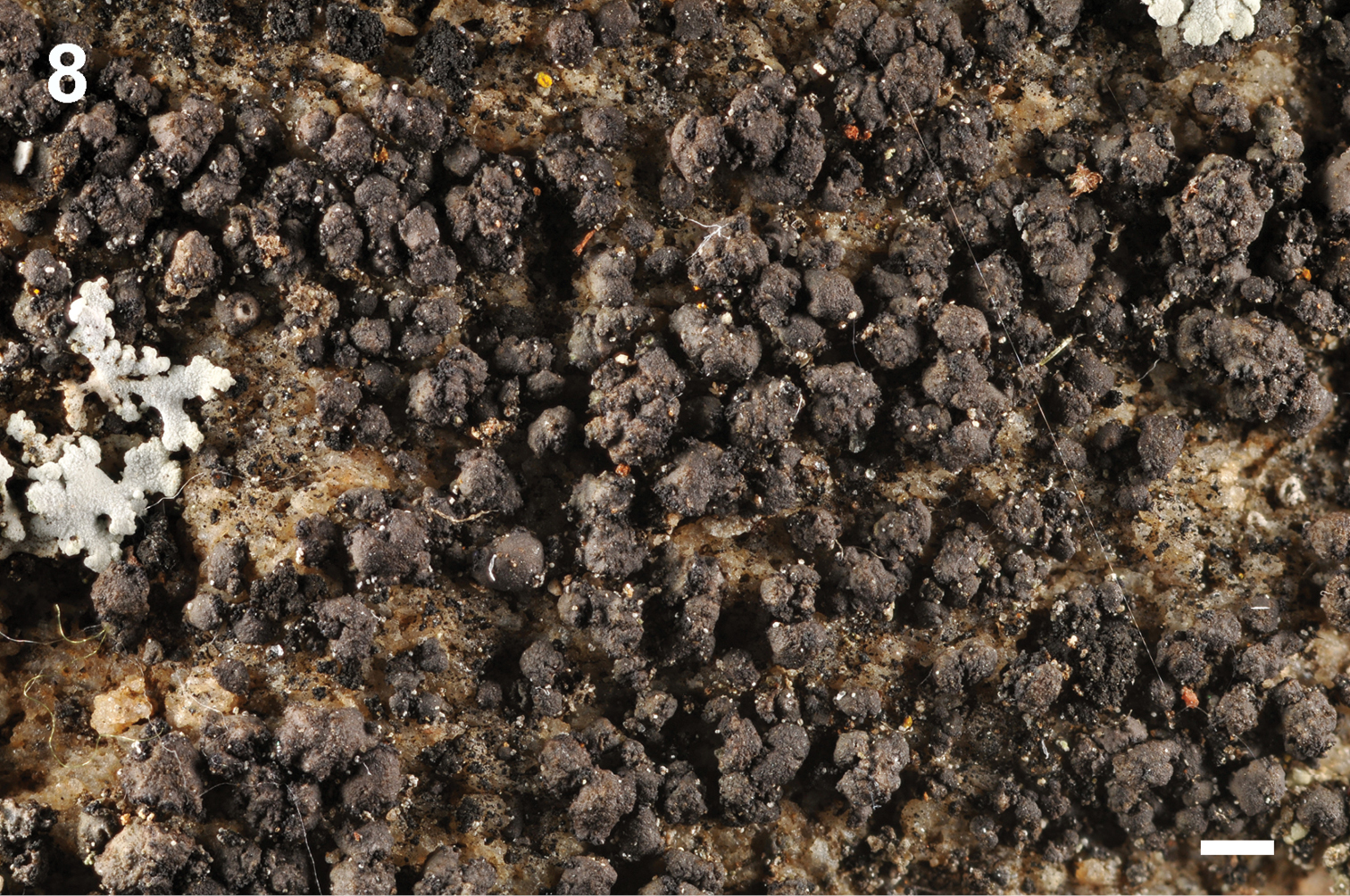
Peltula placodizans

Peltulaceae has a cosmopolitan distribution, with members found across various continents. These lichens are particularly well-adapted to arid and semi-arid environments. Despite their preference for dry habitats, some species have been documented in areas with more moderate climates, including locations as far north as Sweden and as easterly as the Baikal region of Siberia.

Five species of Peltula are known to occur in India. About 20 species have been recorded in China, and 18 from North America north of Mexico. Fifteen species occur in Australia, and eleven species were reported to occur in East Africa.

Peltulaceae species occupy a diverse array of substrates. Many members of the family are saxicolous, growing on rock surfaces. These rock-dwelling species can be found on various geological formations, from exposed cliff faces to small stones. Some Peltulaceae have evolved to grow on soil, while others, such as Peltula corticola, have adapted to a corticolous lifestyle, growing on tree bark. In an example of niche specialisation, P. inversa exhibits a hypolithic habit, growing on the underside of quartz rocks.

Several Peltula species show remarkable substrate tolerance. A 2024 study in northeastern Brazil found that P. obscurans, P. euploca, and P. impressa were able to colonise rocks with high levels of natural gamma radiation, while most other lichen genera were absent from these uranium-rich substrates. In India, burnt clay tiles, commonly used for roofing, support both P. euploca and P. patellata. Under constant sun exposure for most of the day, the lichens develop a thickened upper cortex that both helps to retain moisture and acts as a photoprotectant.

The family's adaptability is further exemplified by the range of specific microhabitats they occupy. Some species prefer inclined rock surfaces, while others colonise flat rock expanses. Certain Peltulaceae species have developed the ability to withstand periodic inundation, allowing them to inhabit seepage areas on rocks that are occasionally flooded.

The morphological and anatomical features of Peltulaceae species often correspond to their specific environmental conditions. For instance, the development of the epinecral layer, which provides protection to the photobiont, is influenced by the intensity of light in the habitat. The various growth forms observed in the family, from peltate to crustose, are closely linked to water availability in their respective environments. Species that experience occasional submersion often possess large medullary cavities, an adaptation that likely aids in gas exchange and water relations during both dry and inundated periods. As primary producers in often-sparse environments, they contribute to soil stability, nutrient cycling, and provide microhabitats for other organisms.

== Species ==
As of September 2024, Species Fungorum (in the Catalogue of Life) accepts 35 species in Peltula, although 66 unique species names have been proposed in the genus.

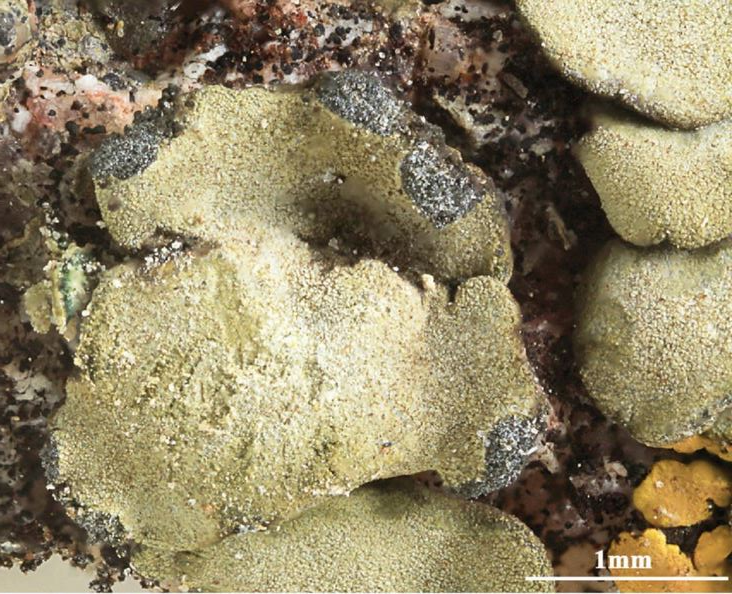
Peltula farinosa, collected in Brazil

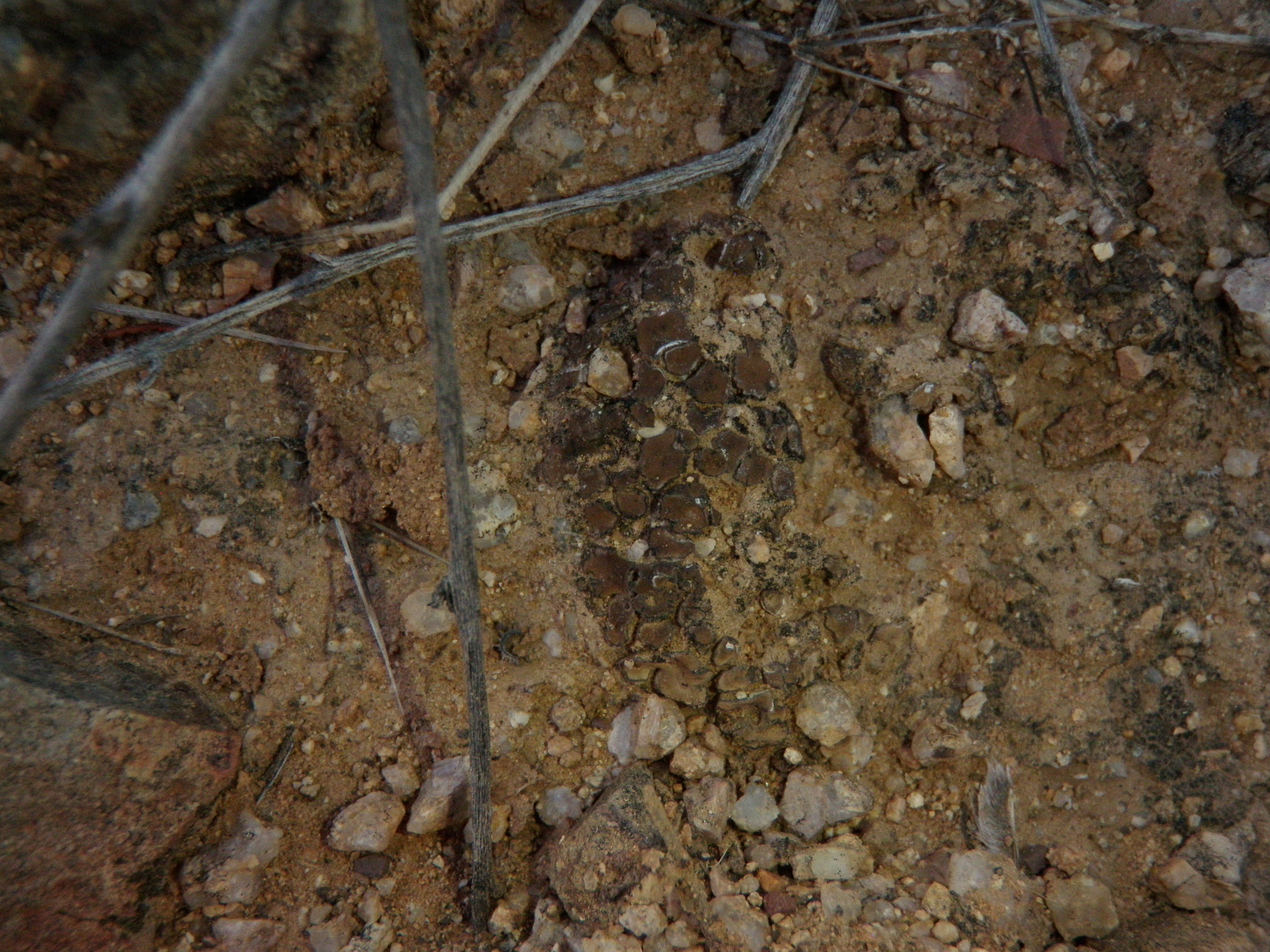
Peltula richardsii

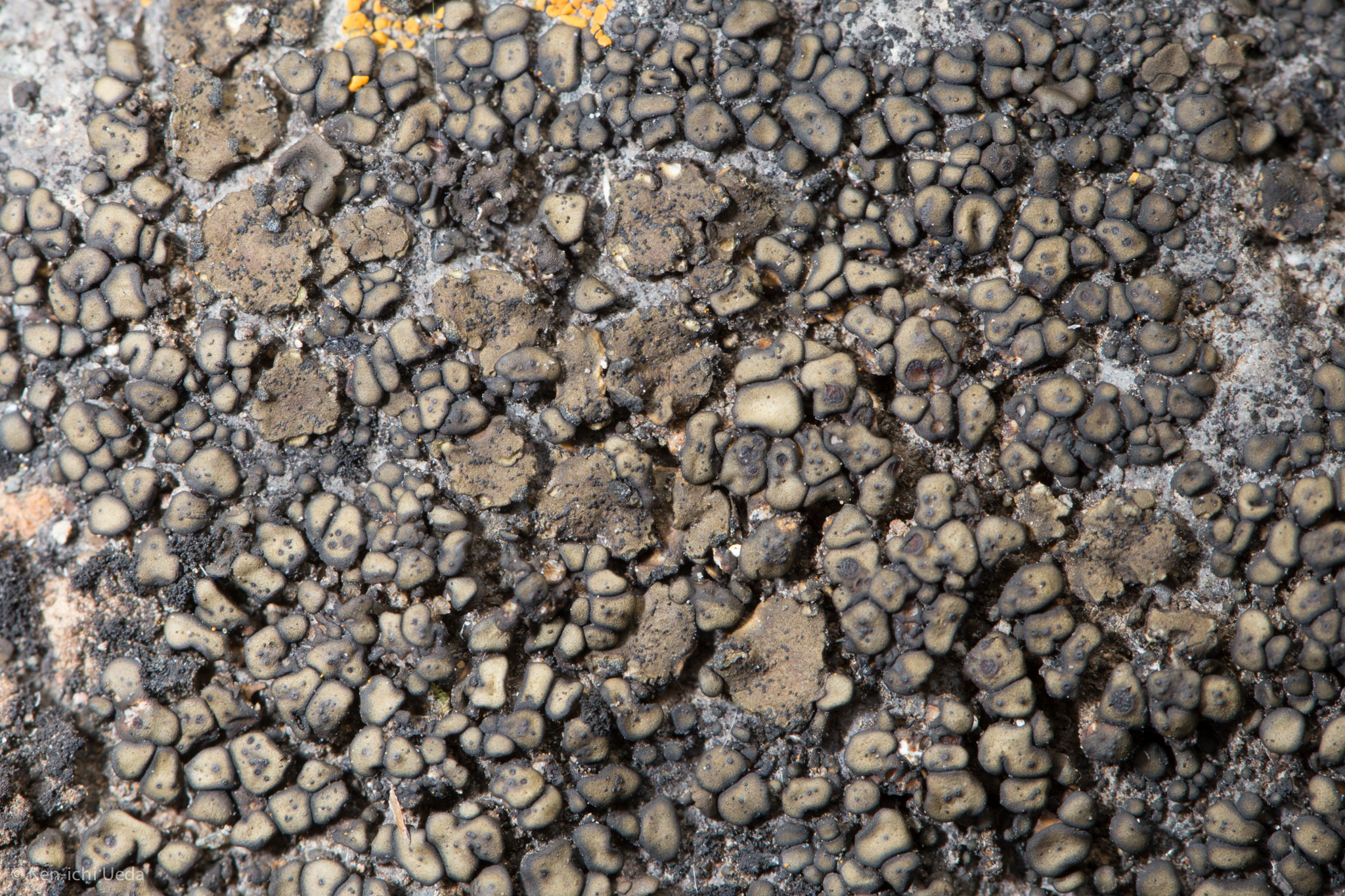
Peltula zahlbruckneri

- Peltula africana (Jatta) Swinscow & Krog (1979)
- Peltula anthracina Kitaura (2022)
- Peltula auriculata Büdel, M.Schultz & A.Gröger (2000)
- Peltula bolanderi (Tuck.) Wetmore (1971)
- Peltula boletiformis (Hue) Henssen & Büdel (1987)
- Peltula brasiliensis (Zahlbr.) Büdel, Kauff & Bachran (2018)
- Peltula capensis (Brusse) Büdel (1987)
- Peltula cataractae (Büdel & Sérus.) Büdel, Kauff & Bachran (2018)
- Peltula clavata (Kremp.) Wetmore (1971)
- Peltula confusa Q.X.Yang & X.L.Wei (2022) – China
- Peltula congregata (Nyl.) Swinscow & Krog (1979)
- Peltula coriacea Büdel, Henssen & Wessels (1986)
- Peltula corticola Büdel & R.Sant. (1987)
- Peltula crispatula (Nyl.) Egea (1989)
- Peltula cylindrica Wetmore (1971)
- Peltula daurica T.V.Makryi (2017)
- Peltula euploca (Ach.) Poelt ex Pišút (1967)
- Peltula farinosa Büdel (1994)
- Peltula guepinii (Delise) Gyeln. (1935)
- Peltula hassei (Zahlbr.) Büdel, Kauff & Bachran (2018)
- Peltula imbricata Filson (1988)
- Peltula impressa (Vain.) Swinscow & Krog (1979)
- Peltula impressula (H.Magn.) N.S.Golubk. (1981)
- Peltula inversa Büdel & M.Schultz (2003)
- Peltula japonica (Asahina) Yoshim. (1974)
- Peltula koflerae Henssen & Büdel (1986)
- Peltula leptophylla (Vain.) Büdel & M.Schultz (2018)
- Peltula lingulata (Vain.) Swinscow & Krog (1979)
- Peltula lobata J.Marques, M.Schultz & Paz-Berm. (2013) – Europe
- Peltula lobulata Q.X.Yang & X.L.Wei (2022) – China
- Peltula marginata Büdel (1987)
- Peltula obscurans (Nyl.) Gyeln. (1935)
- Peltula obscuratula (Nyl.) Poelt ex Egea (1989)
- Peltula omphaliza (Nyl. ex Eckfeldt) Wetmore (1971)
- Peltula patellata (Bagl.) Swinscow & Krog (1979)
- Peltula placodizans (Zahlbr.) Wetmore (1971)
- Peltula polycarpa Q.X.Yang & X.L.Wei (2022) – China
- Peltula polyphylla Q.X.Yang & X.L.Wei (2022) – China
- Peltula psammophila (Nyl.) Egea (1989)
- Peltula pseudoboletiformis Q.X.Yang & X.L.Wei (2022) – China
- Peltula radicata Nyl. (1853)
- Peltula richardsii (Herre) Wetmore (1971)
- Peltula rodriguesii (Cromb.) Büdel (1989)
- Peltula ruinicola (Nyl.) Gyeln. (1935)
- Peltula santessonii Swinscow & Krog (1979)
- Peltula sonorensis Büdel & T.H.Nash (1993)
- Peltula steppae (Kalb) Büdel, Kauff & Bachran (2018)
- Peltula submarginata Q.X.Yang & X.L.Wei (2022) – China
- Peltula subpatellata Q.X.Yang & X.L.Wei (2022) – China
- Peltula tenebrata (Nyl.) Gyeln. (1935)
- Peltula tenuis Büdel & Henssen (1987)
- Peltula tortuosa (Nees) Wetmore (1971)
- Peltula umbilicata (Vain.) Swinscow & Krog (1979)
- Peltula zahlbruckneri (Hasse) Wetmore (1971)
- Peltula zabolotnoji (Elenkin) N.S.Golubk. (1981)

Peltula langei Büdel & Elix (1997), a Western Australian species described as new in 1997, was not validly published. The original binomial for Peltula oleifera (H.Magn.) J.C.Wei (1991) (Heppia oleifera H.Magn.) had already been reduced to synonymy with Peltula impressula in 1981, a decade before Wei erroneously proposed a transfer to Peltula.
