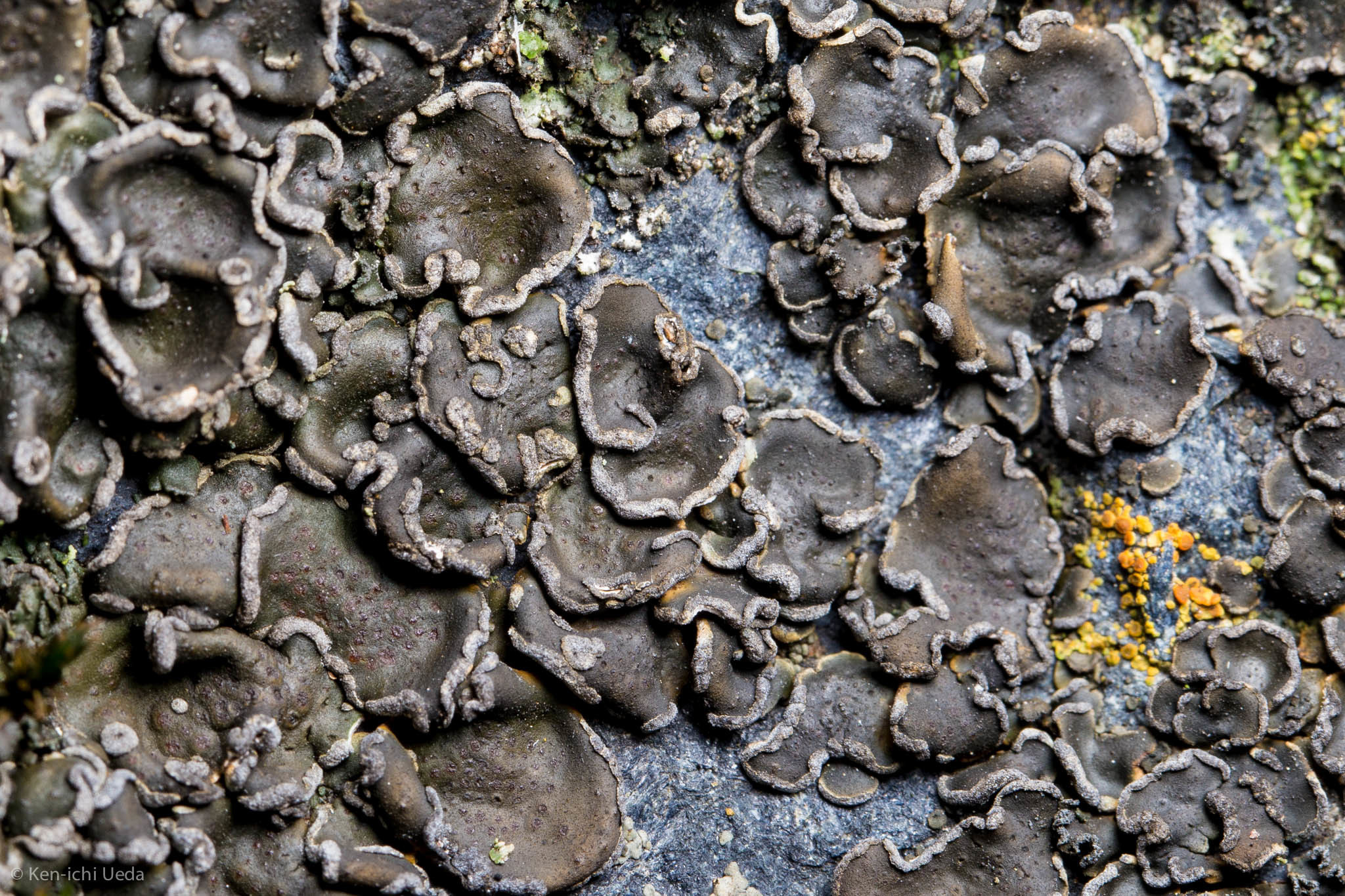

Scientific classification
- Kingdom: Fungi
- Division: Ascomycota
- Class: Lichinomycetes
- Order: Lichinales
- Family: Peltulaceae
- Genus: Peltula
- Species: P. euploca

Binomial name
- Peltula euploca (Ach.) Poelt ex Pišút (1967)

Synonyms
- Lichen euplocus Ach. (1799); Endocarpon euplocum (Ach.) Ach. (1803); Lichen hepaticus * euplocum (Ach.) Lam. (1813); Endocarpon miniatum f. euplocum (Ach.) Wahlenb. (1826); Endocarpon miniatum var. euplocum (Ach.) Wahlenb. (1826); Verrucaria euploca (Ach.) Borrer (1831); Endocarpon fluviatile var. euplocum (Ach.) Rabenh. (1845); Heppia euploca (Ach.) Vain. (1921)

= Peltula euploca =

Species of lichen-forming fungus

Peltula euploca, the powdery rock-olive, is a species of lichen-forming fungus in the family Peltulaceae. First described in 1799 by the Swedish lichenologist Erik Acharius, the species was later transferred through several genera before molecular studies confirmed its placement in Peltula, the sole genus in Peltulaceae. Its overall appearance is that of a powdery-edged, olive-green rosette closely pressed to the substrate. In dry conditions it often becomes dull and brownish but can quickly rehydrate and turn green when moistened. Each thallus is attached to the rock by a single central point (an umbilicus) and spreads outward as a small shield-shaped lobe, typically only a few millimetres across but sometimes reaching about 12 mm in diameter. The lichen rarely produces fruiting bodies; instead, it reproduces mainly through powdery soredia that form along the margins and give the thallus its characteristic dusty border. It grows on exposed siliceous rocks in arid and semi-arid regions worldwide, occurring in deserts of the American Southwest, semi-arid parts of Mediterranean Europe, and the Australian Outback, and is regarded as the most widespread species in its genus. Like other cyanolichens, it partners with cyanobacteria rather than green algae, an association linked with tolerance of intense sunlight and prolonged drought on bare rock surfaces.

== Taxonomy ==
Peltula euploca was first described in 1799 by the Swedish lichenologist Erik Acharius, who named it Lichen euplocus, based on material collected from Sweden by Johan Peter Westring. Over the 19th and early 20th centuries, the species was reclassified multiple times as understanding of lichen taxonomy evolved. It was placed in the genera Endocarpon and Verrucaria (both perithecial lichens in the order Verrucariales) and later in Dermatocarpon (a foliose genus), reflecting historical uncertainty over its affinities. In 1921 Edvard Vainio transferred it to Heppia, a genus of soil lichens. Several names, such as Heppia guepinii (Delise) Nyl., were once applied to what is now known as P. euploca, before being treated as synonyms. The modern name Peltula euploca goes back to a combination published by Josef Poelt in 1962, when he transferred Acharius's Lichen euplocus to the genus Peltula as Peltula euploca. In that work Poelt placed Peltula in the Heppiaceae and characterised P. euploca as an umbilicate, shingle-like lichen with marginal soralia on occasionally wetted siliceous rock surfaces in dry, warm regions, especially the Mediterranean. He reported its range as extending north to southern Sweden. That name is now treated as nomenclaturally invalid under Article 41.5 of the Shenzhen Code because the basionym was not cited in the required way, and the combination was validly published only later by Ivan Pišút in 1967, adopting Poelt's authorship of the new combination; the currently accepted citation is therefore Peltula euploca (Ach.) Poelt ex Pišút.

Molecular phylogenetics studies have clarified the placement of Peltula euploca and its relatives. Peltula was traditionally grouped with a few segregate genera (such as Neoheppia and Phyllopeltula) distinguished by subtle morphological differences. However, DNA sequence analyses have shown that those segregates do not form separate lineages: they are nested within the genus Peltula. Kauff et al. (2018), examining multiple gene regions for dozens of samples (including P. euploca), found that Neoheppia and Phyllopeltula are not monophyletic and should be included in a broader Peltula. As a result, the family Peltulaceae is now considered monogeneric, with Peltula euploca and all its close relatives unified in the single genus Peltula. These studies also support earlier observations of two main lineages within Peltula based on attachment: P. euploca exemplifies the group of umbilicate Peltula species (attached by a single central holdfast), as opposed to species that attach via diffuse rhizohyphae.

In North America, it is commonly known as the "powdery rock-olive".

== Description ==
Peltula euploca is a squamulose cyanolichen with a distinctive peltate (shield-like) thallus. Individual peltate squamules are usually only a few millimetres across but can reach about 12 mm in diameter in well-developed material. The upper surface is dull to slightly shiny olive to olive-brown when moist, becoming darker and browner when dry, and the margins are often bent downwards or somewhat lobulate. The squamule edges carry bluish-grey farinose (floury) soralia that are normally on the margins but can extend onto the upper surface; the resulting soredia are the main means of vegetative reproduction, as apothecia are infrequent. The lower surface is paler and lacks rhizines, and the thallus is attached at a single central umbilicus (a holdfast) that anchors it tightly to the rock.

Its apothecia (sexual fruiting structures) are rarely seen. When present, they appear as tiny immersed discs in the thallus surface. The discs are reddish, brown, or black. Inside each apothecium, the asci are club-shaped and polysporous – containing dozens of ascospores (typically 32 to over 100 per ascus, rather than the usual 8). The ascospores are hyaline, ellipsoid to rod-shaped, about 6–9 micrometres (μm) long by 3–5 μm wide. P. euploca also has tiny pycnidia (asexual spore-producing structures) immersed in the thallus; these produce slender fusiform (spindle-shaped) conidia about 3 × 1 μm.

In cross-section, P. euploca has a thin upper epinecral layer of dead cells but no true upper cortex. Beneath this is a distinct photobiont layer (about 70–150 μm thick) containing a zone of unicellular cyanobacteria, and a medulla with loosely woven hyphae and many air spaces. A well-developed lower cortex (18–90 μm thick) of prosoplectenchymatous tissue is present on the underside, except at the central attaching point. Like other Peltula species, P. euploca contains no secondary metabolites (all standard spot tests are negative).

Microscopic features of Peltula euploca
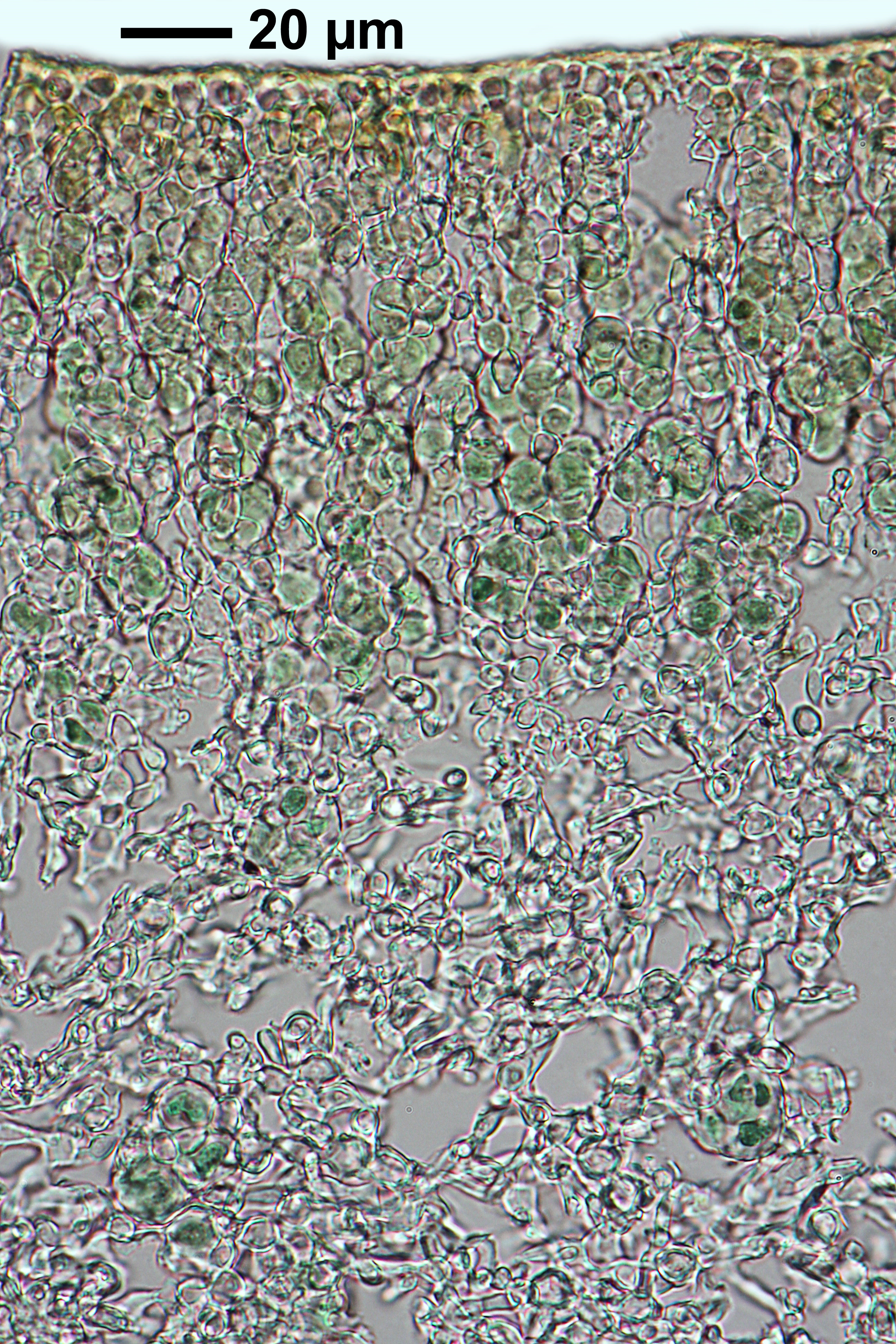
Photobiont layer in a lobe cross-section; green cyanobacterial cells clustered beneath the upper surface (scale bar: 20 μm).

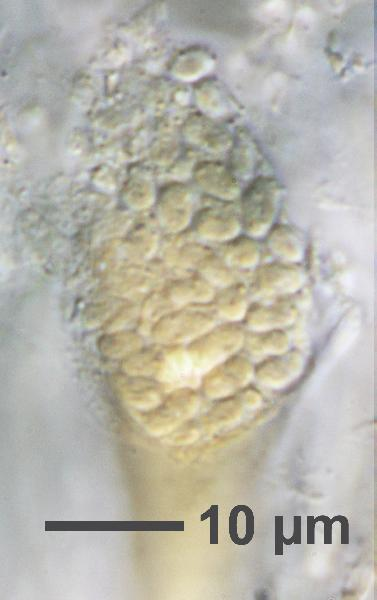
Club-shaped, polysporous ascus, a key microscopic feature of the species (scale bar: 10 μm).

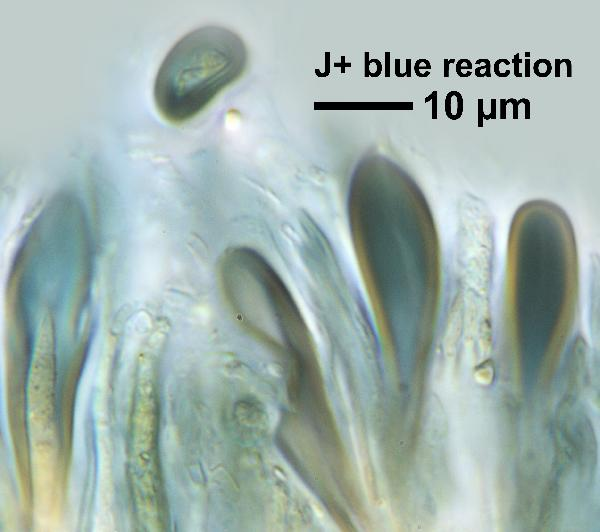
Ascospores showing a J+ (blue) iodine reaction (scale bar: 10 μm).

Field studies in the Upper Douro region of Portugal have shown that P. euploca is highly variable in form. Besides typical peltate squamules up to about 12 mm wide, the species there produces several morphotypes: polyphyllous squamules divided into elongate, somewhat undulate lobes; small sorediate squamules only 2–4 mm across with dark margins; tiny, closely adnate sorediate squamules forming an effigurate thallus; and soredia-lacking thalli that regularly develop numerous apothecia. Marques and co-workers treated these morphs as a single species but suggested that detailed morphological and molecular work is needed to determine whether they represent ecological forms or hidden diversity. Molecular evidence suggests that what has been treated as a single variable species may actually comprise more than one lineage. In a 2022 study, the typical form of P. euploca and a sorediate form (referred to as P. euploca subsp. sorediosa) grouped separately in DNA analyses, indicating that the typical form and the sorediate form represent distinct genetic lineages.

== Habitat and distribution ==
Peltula euploca is an arid-land saxicolous lichen that grows on rock surfaces. It grows on acidic rocks and only rarely on calcareous substrates. The typical habitat is open, dry terrain – for example, sun-exposed boulders and outcrops in deserts, semi-deserts, and other sparsely vegetated areas. In the American Southwest, it occurs on non-calcareous rock in extremely dry sites, but it can also occupy somewhat shaded or intermittently damp microhabitats such as canyon walls that remain arid most of the time.

In the Upper Douro valley of north-east Portugal, P. euploca is common on vertical schist outcrops in hot, dry Mediterranean river gorges, where summer temperatures can approach 50 °C and annual rainfall is often below 300 mm. There it colonises almost all sheltered to fully exposed schist faces and is a dominant species in siliceous "rain-track" lichen communities on seepage tracks of the rock walls. In the Côa Valley (Portugal) it forms widespread squamulose populations on vertical schist surfaces.

With a cosmopolitan distribution, Peltula euploca is the most widespread species of Peltula: it has been recorded from all continents except Antarctica and is especially common in subtropical and tropical arid regions. In North America it is known from the southwestern United States (such as the Sonoran and Mojave Deserts in Arizona and California) and northern Mexico, extending northward into drier parts of the western states. In the Old World, P. euploca occurs in Mediterranean Europe, North and East Africa, the Middle East, and across Asia in dry zones. It is present in arid parts of Central Asia and has even been found in southern Siberia near Lake Baikal, surviving on sun-baked rocks despite the generally cold climate. The species is also widespread in Australia, where it is considered a common species and is recorded from all Australian states and mainland territories. Across its range, P. euploca inhabits elevations from lowland deserts up to montane slopes, wherever suitable exposed rock and arid conditions coincide. Its ability to occupy "micro-desert" niches (for instance, a well-drained sunny rock face) allows it to persist even in regions of higher rainfall, as long as the immediate site remains dry much of the time. On West African inselbergs, it has been recorded from granite outcrops in the Ivory Coast savanna zone, where it was reported as a new lichen species for that country. In Ethiopia, Kenya, and Uganda in East Africa, it is frequently found on dry or periodically inundated rock surfaces at elevations of roughly 1,000–2,100 m.

In Switzerland, P. euploca is extremely rare and is known from a few sites on south-facing amphibolite rock faces in the southern Alps near Ascona and Ronco sopra Ascona. There it colonises dust-enriched ledges and rock niches that are periodically moistened by seepage water, often forming dense turfs along seepage streaks and occasionally spreading onto mortar in retaining walls beside mountain roads.

== Ecology ==
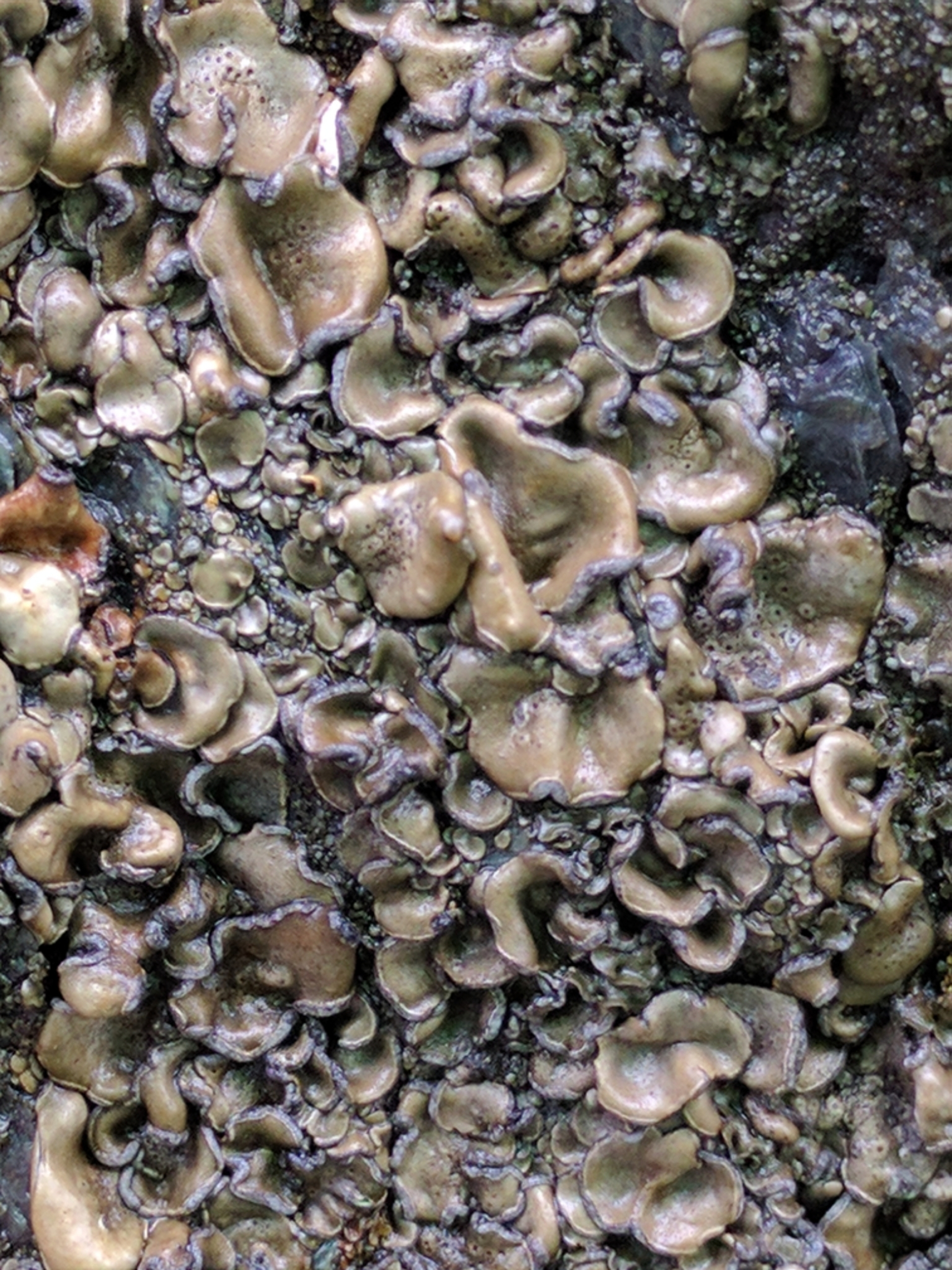
Typical olive-brown, umbilicate squamules of Peltula euploca on siliceous rock in California

Peltula euploca is a cyanolichen whose photobiont consists of coccoid cyanobacteria rather than green algae. In the Mediterranean region, it grows in arid and semi-arid localities on fully exposed rock surfaces, a habitat type that is considered typical for species of Peltula worldwide. In the Côa Valley (Portugal) the photobiont in P. euploca has been identified as a unicellular cyanobacterium assigned to Chroococcidiopsis, whereas sympatric crustose lichens in the same habitat have green algal partners (Trebouxia). Raman spectroscopy of P. euploca has detected characteristic bands of chlorophyll and carotenoid pigments (β-carotene) in the photobiont cells, and similar spectra have been proposed as potential biosignatures for lichen-like life in extreme environments.

On bare rock, the first stages of P. euploca develop in small cavities where a blackish microbial crust forms from cyanobacteria, fungal hyphae, and scattered green algae. Young thalli arise from this mixture, initially with the photobiont layer dominating and only a thin medulla, before differentiating into a stratified thallus with an epinecral layer, a thin upper cortex, a cyanobacterial layer, and a looser medulla over a well-developed lower cortex. The down-curved, loosely structured margin acts both as the growth zone and as a soralium (soredia-forming region): photobiont cells there are enmeshed by hyphae and shed as soredia, which serve as the main means of vegetative dispersal in exposed rock habitats.

Anatomical studies interpret the structure of P. euploca as an adaptation to dry climates. Its peltate thallus can trap capillary water beneath the lower side, and experimental work on the genus indicates that such thalli can absorb water equivalent to roughly two and a half times their dry weight, in addition to the water held in the space between thallus and rock. The combination of a thin pigmented upper cortex, an epinecral layer, and a loosely structured medulla allows the lichen to take up liquid water rapidly from rain or dew, while the upper layers help protect the cyanobacterial photobiont from intense sunlight in exposed sites.

In Mediterranean Europe P. euploca is a characteristic species of the lichen community Peltuletum euplocae, which occupies light-exposed, warm seepage tracks on base-rich silicate rocks and is rich in cyanobacterial lichens such as Lichinella, Thyrea, Anema, Collema, Porocyphus, and Forssellia. This community has its main centres in Spain, southern France and North Africa, with scattered outlying stands reaching into central Europe. At its Swiss sites P. euploca grows with other cyanobacterial lichens such as Anema tumidulum and Polychidium muscicola, as well as crustose and foliose species including Caloplaca subsoluta, Aspicilia contorta, Collema fuscovirens, and Dermatocarpon miniatum; together these form a Peltuletum euplocae community on seepage-influenced amphibolite faces.

In Mediterranean rock outcrops P. euploca frequently serves as the substrate for the lichenicolous (lichen-dwelling) lichen Glyphopeltis ligustica, a species with a green-algal photobiont that, in the Mediterranean region, is reported to grow only on Peltula thalli. Ascospores of G. ligustica germinate and re-lichenise mainly in the loose marginal zone of P. euploca, where green algae occur between the hyphae and cyanobacteria of the growth zone. The resulting thalli develop a very thick upper cortex and medullary hyphae that penetrate into the algal layer of the underlying P. euploca; combined with shading, this eventually leads to degeneration and death of the host thallus, after which G. ligustica continues to grow on the remains. Ott and Scheidegger interpreted this association as an antagonistic, lichenicolous relationship that combines parasitic and necrotrophic phases and gives G. ligustica an ecological advantage in extremely dry rock habitats. On West African inselbergs, P. euploca forms part of brown, Peltula-dominated cyanolichen crusts on exposed granite surfaces in the savanna zone, and such crusts have been implicated in enhanced nitrogen accumulation in soils at the base of inselbergs.

On schist in the Côa Valley Archaeological Park, hyphae from the medulla of P. euploca penetrate on average about 2–3 mm into the rock (up to 3.9 mm in the samples studied), showing that the umbilicate holdfast extends several millimetres below the surface rather than remaining superficial. These measurements indicate that the lichen contributes to mechanical weathering of the schist substrate, although in that community its overall impact is lower than that of some associated crustose lichens with more extensive hyphal spread.

Spectroscopic work on colonised schist in the Côa Valley has detected calcium oxalate dihydrate (weddellite) both inside thalli of P. euploca and at the lichen–rock interface on south-east-facing surfaces, whereas the same mineral is absent from uncolonised rock. The authors interpret these oxalate crusts as evidence that P. euploca participates in chemical alteration of the schist, although they caution that some calcium may also be supplied by airborne dust rather than the substrate alone.
