= Peltula obscurans =

Conservation status
- Secure (NatureServe)

Scientific classification
- Kingdom: Fungi
- Division: Ascomycota
- Class: Lichinomycetes
- Order: Lichinales
- Family: Peltulaceae
- Genus: Peltula
- Species: P. obscurans

Binomial name
- Peltula obscurans (Nyl.) Gyeln. (1935)

Synonyms
- Endocarpiscum obscurans Nyl. (1872)

Species of lichen

Peltula obscurans (common rock-olive) is a dark olive to dark gray squamulose lichen that grows on rock and soil in arid habitats around the world. It may grow as a rosette of squamulous lobes, or with widely scattered lobes. A single black apothecium may be centered on the lobe. The apothecia disc turns reddish-brown when wet, which contrasts with the lobes that turn olive-green when wet. It can be found in southern Europe, South America, southwestern North America, Africa, Asia, Australia, and Papua New Guinea.
