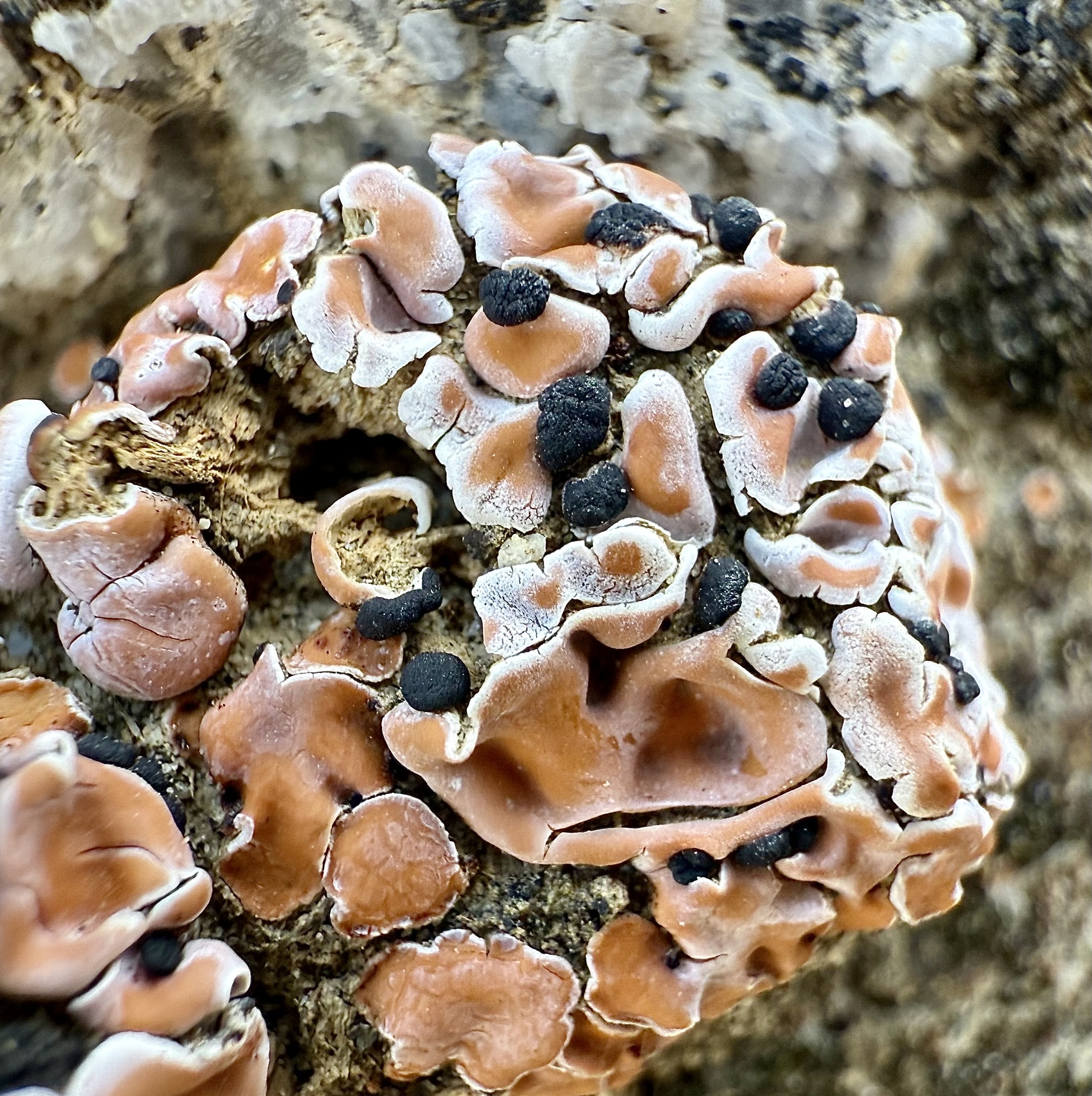
- Psora decipiens

Scientific classification
- Kingdom: Fungi
- Division: Ascomycota
- Class: Lecanoromycetes
- Order: Lecanorales
- Family: Psoraceae
- Genus: Psora; Hoffm. (1796)

Type species
- Psora decipiens (Hedw.) Hoffm. (1794)

Synonyms
- Fritzea Stein (1879); Chrysopsora Lagerh. (1892); Lecidea sect. Chrysopsora Vain. [as 'Chrysospora'] (1934); Peltiphylla M.Choisy (1950); Chrysopsora (Vain.) M.Choisy (1951)

= Psora =

Genus of lichen-forming fungi

Psora is a genus of lichen-forming fungi in the family Psoraceae. Members of the genus are commonly called fishscale lichens. Lichens in the genus Psora generally have a squamulose thallus and anthraquinones in the hymenium. Photobiont partners of Psora lichens include members of the green algal genera Asterochloris, Chloroidium, Myrmecia, and Trebouxia.

== Taxonomy ==
The genus Psora was first validly published in 1796 by the German lichenologist Georg Franz Hoffmann. His diagnosis of the genus was brief: Crusta effigurata. Scutellae marginatae, convexae. "Crust patterned. Scutellae (small shields) bordered, convex.") He included 26 species in the genus.

== Description ==
Genus Psora comprises lichens recognised for their relatively large, thick squamules, which are the leaf-like structures making up the lichen's body. These squamules, ranging in colour from yellow to red-brown and typically measuring between 2 and 6 mm in diameter, are notable for their absence of a prothallus, which is an initial growth phase seen in some lichens. The upper cortex of these lichens is thick and well-developed, while the lower cortex may be poorly developed or entirely absent. Instead of a lower cortex, Psora species often anchor themselves with a well-developed network of fungal hyphae, which can either lack calcium oxalate crystals and have a brown pigmentation or be colourless, shorter, and densely covered in these crystals.

The symbiotic partner of Psora, the photobiont, is chlorococcoid, meaning it consists of spherical green algae, forming a continuous layer. The medulla, the innermost layer of the lichen, is well-developed but does not contain iodine-reactive substances (I–).

Reproductive structures, known as apothecia, are sessile (attached directly by their base), and can be found along the margins or on the surface (laminal) of the squamules. These structures are typically brown-black, starting flat or slightly convex in their youth, and may become highly convex or semi-spherical as they mature, occasionally with a white or yellow powdery coating (pruina). Unlike some lichens, Psora does not have a thalline margin around its apothecia. The true exciple, a ring of hyphae surrounding the apothecial disc, is colourless to pale brown and often becomes obscured as the apothecia mature.

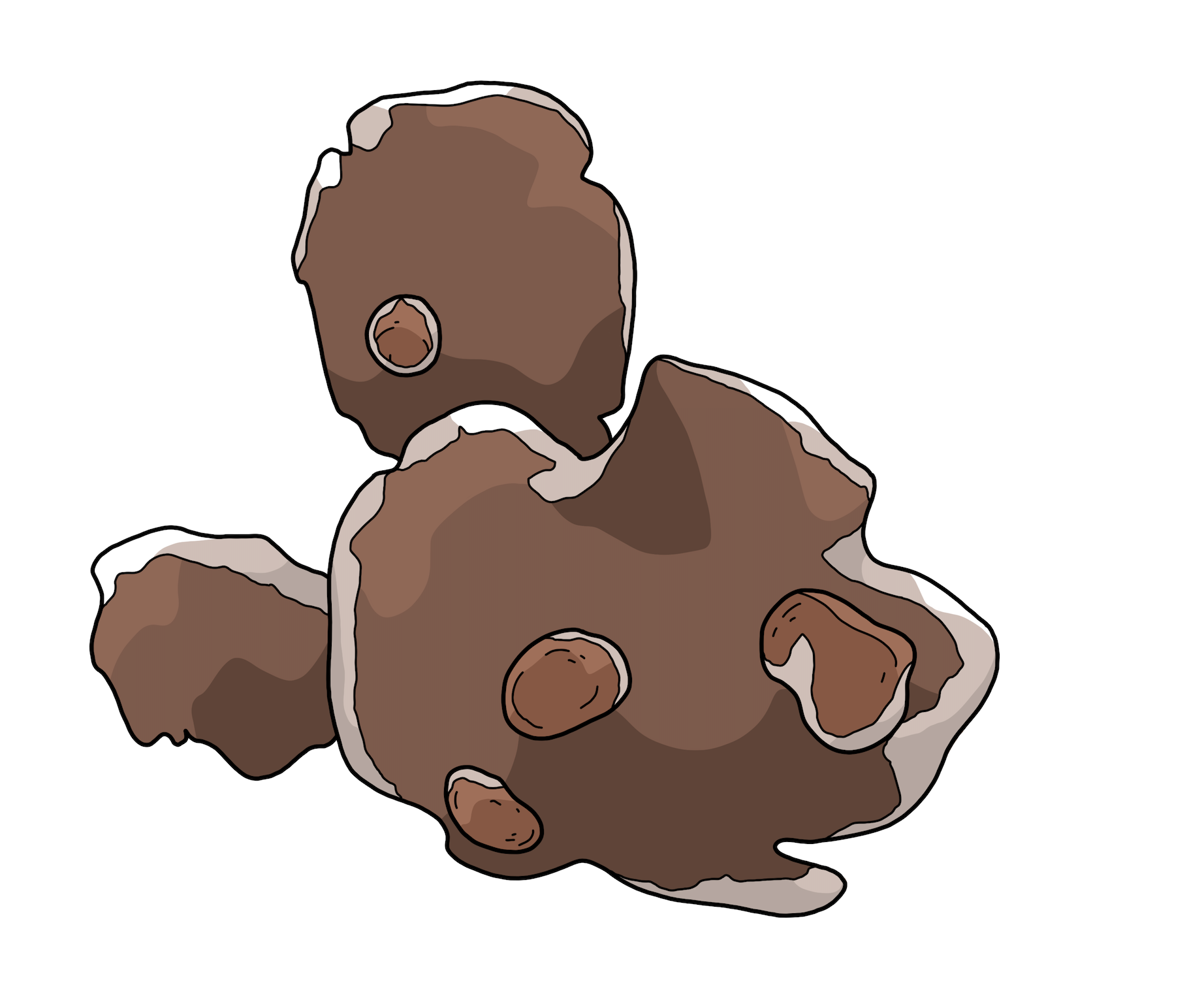
Illustration of Psora mediterranea

The epithecium, the topmost layer inside the apothecia, is red-brown or brown and contains anthraquinones compounds, such as parietin, which react red or purple-red when treated with a potassium hydroxide solution (K+), but do not react with a nitric acid solution (N–). The hymenium, another internal layer, also does not react to iodine (I–). The hypothecium beneath it is pale brown to colourless and filled with calcium oxalate crystals.

Psora's supporting filamentous structures, or paraphyses, are unbranched or sparingly branched and tightly bound together, with slightly swollen tips. The asci, the spore-bearing cells, are clavate (club-shaped) with eight spores each and have a distinctive blue reaction when stained with iodine, indicative of the Porpidia-type asci without an ocular chamber. Ascospores are colourless, smooth, ellipsoidal, and lack a septum or a thick outer layer (perispore). The genus also produces pycnidia, a type of asexual reproductive structure, which are immersed within the squamules and release elongate-bacilliform (rod-shaped), colourless conidia.

Chemically, Psora has a range of compounds including depsides, depsidones, anthraquinones, various acids such as pulvinic and usnic acids, and triterpenes.

== Species ==
As of January 2026, Species Fungorum (in the Catalogue of Life) accept 112 species of Psora. However, there are additional accepted species that have not yet been added. Although nearly 400 names have been published in this genus, most of these have been reduced to synonymy, transferred to other genera, or are older names that have not been examined with molecular methods.

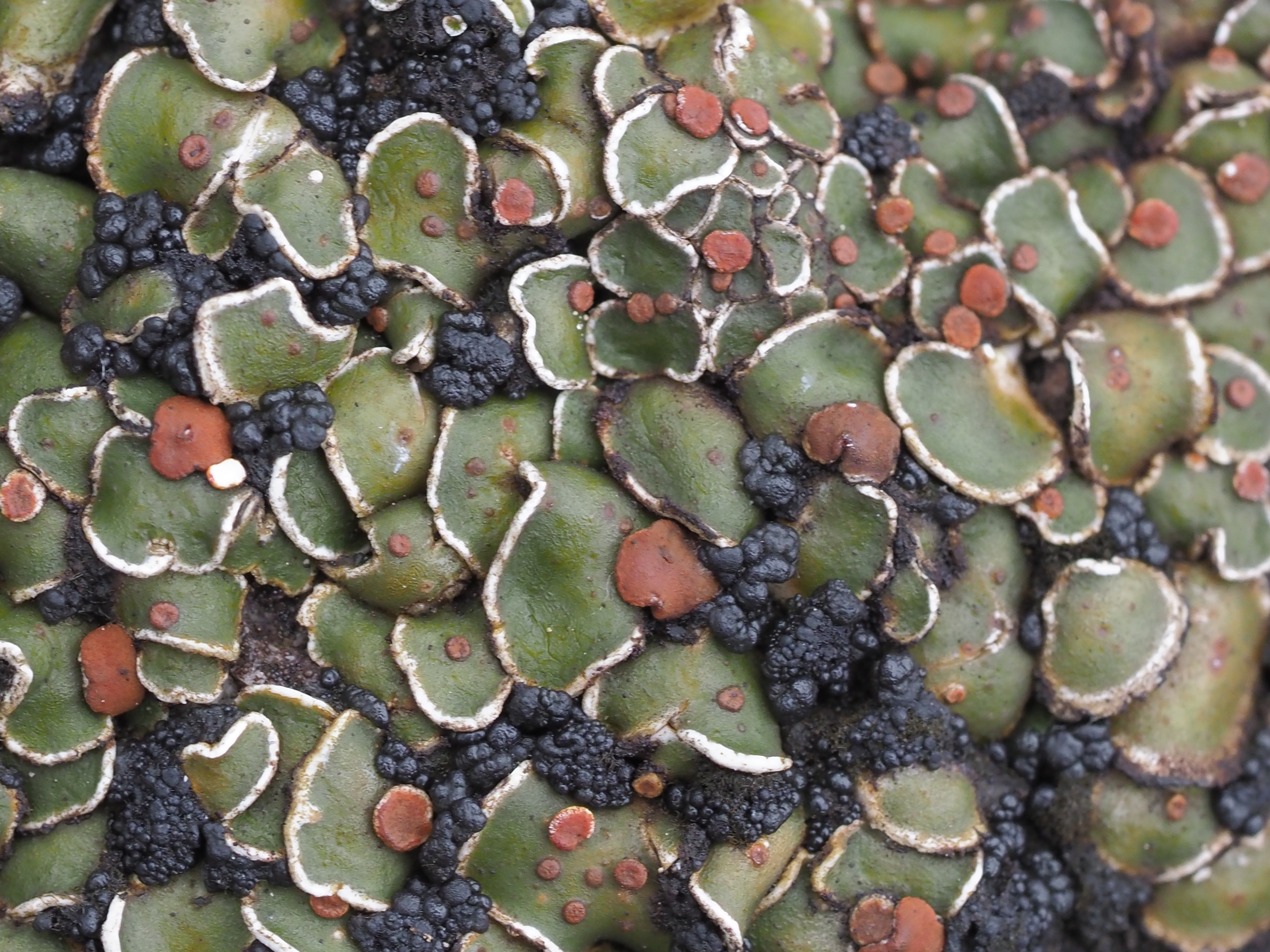
Psora pseudorussellii

- Psora alabastrina Hoffm. (1796)
- Psora altotibetica Timdal, Obermayer & Bendiksby (2016)
- Psora americana B.de Lesd. (1939)
- Psora anaeiformis Anzi (1868)
- Psora atrocinerea Hepp (1857)
- Psora bellilensis Brien & Cl.Roux (2025)
- Psora brunneocarpa Timdal (2002)
- Psora caesiella Hepp (1853)
- Psora cerebriformis W.A.Weber (1981)
- Psora confusa Maheu & A.Gillet (1926)
- Psora cravensis Cl.Roux et Poumarat (2025)
- Psora crenata (Taylor) Reinke (1895)
- Psora crystallifera (Taylor) Müll.Arg. (1888)
- Psora decipiens (Hedw.) Hoffm. (1796)
- Psora endoreagens Tomin (1950)
- Psora erecta Q.X.Yang & X.L.Wei (2025)
- Psora friesiana Hepp (1853)
- Psora globifera (Ach.) A.Massal. (1852)
- Psora granosa Baumg. (1790)
- Psora gresinonis B.de Lesd. (1930)
- Psora grisea Hoffm. (1796)
- Psora himalayana (C.Bab.) Timdal (1986)
- Psora hyporubescens Timdal (2002)
- Psora icterica (Mont.) Müll.Arg. (1888)
- Psora indigirkae Timdal & Zhurb. (2004)
- Psora kongoensis Räsänen (1944)
- Psora mediterranea Evankow & Timdal (2025)
- Psora muscorum Hoffm. (1796)
- Psora nigromarginata Q.X.Yang & X.L.Wei (2025)
- Psora peninsularis Timdal (2002)
- Psora polyphylla Q.X.Yang & X.L.Wei (2025)
- Psora praestabilis Lojka (1876)
- Psora pseudorussellii Timdal (1986)
- Psora pruinosa Timdal (2002)
- Psora rubiformis (Wahlenb. ex Ach.) Hook. (1833)
- Psora taurensis Timdal, Bendiksby, Kahraman & Halıcı (2017)
- Psora testacea Hoffm. (1790)
- Psora vallesiaca (Schaer.) Timdal (1984)
