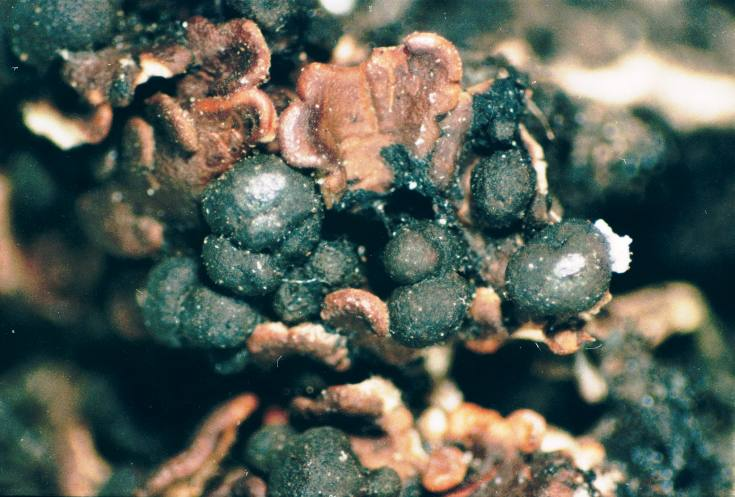
- Psora globifera, member of the Psoraceae

Scientific classification
- Kingdom: Fungi
- Division: Ascomycota
- Class: Lecanoromycetes
- Order: Lecanorales
- Family: Psoraceae; Zahlbr. (1898)

Type genus
- Psora Hoffm. (1789)

Genera
- Brianaria; Glyphopeltis; Protoblastenia; Protomicarea; Psora; Psorula

= Psoraceae =

Family of lichen-forming fungi

The Psoraceae are a family of lichen-forming fungi in the order Lecanorales. The Austrian lichenologist Alexander Zahlbruckner first described the family in 1898. Species of this family have a widespread distribution.

== Taxonomy ==
Psora is the type genus of the Psoraceae, a family of lichen-forming fungi in the order Lecanorales. Recent DNA-based phylogenetic work supports a core Psoraceae clade (a natural group descended from a shared ancestor) that includes Psora together with Protoblastenia and Brianaria; in these analyses, Brianaria and Protoblastenia are sister genera, and their clade is sister to Psora. This Psoraceae clade is recovered as closely related to the families Ramalinaceae and Sphaerophoraceae.

The circumscription of the family has varied, and some modern classifications have also included genera such as Glyphopeltis, Psorula, and Protomicarea. Evankow and colleagues (2025) argued that there is not convincing molecular evidence to keep these taxa in Psoraceae. In their phylogeny, Glyphopeltis falls outside the main Psoraceae clade, and they described a separate family, Glyphopeltidaceae, to accommodate it; they also supported placing Protomicarea in Pilocarpaceae (now Ectolechiaceae) rather than Psoraceae, while the placement of Psorula remains unresolved; Psorula was excluded from their phylogenetic analyses because available sequences were problematic. Evankow and colleagues also noted that Eremastrella has been transferred to the Lecideaceae in recent classifications based on molecular phylogenetic evidence.

== Genera ==
This is a list of the genera contained within the Psoraceae based on a 2022 review and summary of fungal classification. This is a list of the genera contained within the Psoraceae based on a 2022 review and summary of fungal classification. Subsequent phylogenetic work has questioned the placement of some genera that appear in broad classifications (including Glyphopeltis, Protomicarea, and Psorula), and has also noted that Eremastrella—sometimes listed here in the past—has been transferred to the Lecideaceae. The genera below are retained here for consistency with Wijayawardene et al. (2022) pending wider adoption and formal implementation of revised placements in major classification summaries. Following the genus name is the taxonomic authority, year of publication, and the number of species:

- Brianaria S.Ekman & M.Svensson (2014) – 4 spp.
- Glyphopeltis Brusse (1985) – 1 sp.
- Protoblastenia (Zahlbr.) J.Steiner (1911) – 30 spp.
- Protomicarea Hafellner (2001) – 2 spp.
- Psora Hoffm. (1796) – 35 spp.
- Psorula Gotth.Schneid. (1980) – 1 sp.
