= Tichocyphus =

Scientific classification
- Kingdom: Fungi
- Division: Ascomycota
- Class: Lichinomycetes
- Order: Lichinales
- Family: Porocyphaceae
- Genus: Tichocyphus; M.Schultz & M.Prieto (2024)
- Species: T. gotlandicus

Binomial name
- Tichocyphus gotlandicus M.Schultz & M.Prieto (2024)

Single-species lichen genus

Tichocyphus gotlandicus is a fungal genus in the family Porocyphaceae. It comprises the single species Tichocyphus gotlandicus, a cyanolichen. The genus was established in 2024 based on a comprehensive reclassification of cyanolichens, and it is known only from limestone habitats on the Baltic island of Gotland in Sweden, where it grows on exposed rock surfaces near shallow pools. Tichocyphus gotlandicus is a black, thin crust-forming lichen that combines features of two other well-known genera but differs from them in its immersed fruiting structures and the way its internal tissue is organised into distinct upper and lower layers. The species is rarely collected and has been found only a few times, with most specimens lacking fully formed fruiting bodies, suggesting it may be more widespread on Gotland than current records indicate but difficult to identify without microscopic examination.

== Taxonomy ==
The genus Tichocyphus was introduced to accommodate a distinctive black, crust-forming lichen discovered on limestone outcrops on the Baltic island of Gotland in Sweden. The genus is represented only by the type species, Tichocyphus gotlandicus, which was described from material collected on exposed limestone rock surfaces in alvar-like habitat near shallow rock pools. The generic name refers to its mixed resemblance to two previously known genera: it recalls Psorotichia in its dark, cracked crustose thallus and Porocyphus in its small, concave fruiting discs.

Within Porocyphaceae, Tichocyphus sits close to a clade including Thyrea, Pseudocarpon persimile and Watsoniomyces. Like Thyrea and Pseudocarpon, it produces pycnoascocarps, which are sexual fruiting bodies that arise from structures which initially function as pycnidia (asexual spore-producing cavities). In outward appearance, Tichocyphus recalls Porocyphus, Psorotichia and Thelignya, but it can be separated from them on several points: the apothecia stay sunk in or only slightly above the thallus surface, the photosynthetic partner is a single-celled (coccoid) cyanobacteria rather than filamentous forms, and the lower part of the thallus forms a medulla that lacks cyanobiont cells. The asci are of the Peccania type, a particular ascus structure used as a diagnostic character in the family and one of the features that separates Tichocyphus from superficially similar crustose cyanolichens.

== Description ==
In its only known species, Tichocyphus gotlandicus, the thallus forms a thin to rather thick black crust tightly attached to calcareous rock. At low magnification this crust is broken into sharply angular areoles (cracked, tile-like units) that increase in size from the margin towards the centre of the colony, typically from about 0.1 mm near the edge to around 0.7 mm in the middle. The surface is matt to slightly glossy and very finely roughened. In some places the areoles develop slightly lifted margins and begin to resemble tiny squamules, giving parts of the thallus a somewhat squamulose appearance. The lichen is firmly anchored to the rock by fine fungal filaments (rhizohyphae) extending from the underside of the thallus into the substrate.

In section, the thallus is ecorticate, meaning it lacks a separate outer cortex. Instead, it is differentiated into two clearly distinct layers. The upper layer is dark and compact, composed of a dense paraplectenchymatous tissue: the fungal hyphae are arranged in a tight, brick-like pattern of short cells that closely surround the photobiont. The photobiont is a coccoid cyanobacterium whose globose cells are grouped into irregular packets enveloped by a thin yellowish-brown gelatinous sheath. Beneath this, the lower layer forms a pale medulla made of a loose network of thicker-walled, elongated hyphae that lack cyanobacterial cells. This two-layered construction, with photosynthetic cells confined to the upper tissue and a relatively large, photobiont-free basal layer, is a key anatomical feature of the genus.

The apothecia are very small, usually 0.1–0.2 mm in diameter, and are typically one (occasionally two) per areole. They begin fully immersed in the thallus and become semi-immersed to almost level with the surface as they mature, only slightly raised above the surrounding areole. Each apothecium is surrounded by a thin thalline rim derived from the surrounding thallus and a more sharply defined pale inner margin (proper exciple), while the disc itself is dark reddish brown and conspicuously concave. Internally, the hymenium is colourless (hyaline) and reacts strongly blue in iodine after pretreatment with potassium hydroxide solution, reflecting the Peccania-type ascus structure. The asci are club-shaped, thin-walled but surrounded by a gelatinous outer coat that stains deeply blue in Lugol's solution, and they contain eight ascospores arranged in a somewhat two-rowed (subbiseriate) fashion. The ascospores are single-celled, colourless, broadly ellipsoid and become slightly thick-walled with age.

Asexual structures are also present. Immersed pycnidia develop within the thallus as broad ellipsoid cavities that produce small, ellipsoid to short rod-shaped conidia at their inner surface. As the lichen matures, some of these pycnidia transform into pycnoascocarps: the sexual reproductive system develops beneath the original pycnidial cavity, with ascogones forming below and the structure enlarging as ascus development proceeds. This sequence, from pycnidium to pycnoascocarp, is characteristic of Tichocyphus and shared with some of its closest relatives in the Porocyphaceae. No lichen substances have yet been reported for the species, as thin-layer chromatography has not been carried out.

== Habitat and distribution ==
Tichocyphus gotlandicus is so far known only from Gotland, a large limestone island in the Baltic Sea off the coast of Sweden. The type collection was made in an alvar-like area near Skarphagen, where extensive limestone pavement is exposed at the surface. Additional specimens come from similar calcareous habitats on the island, including a coastal cliff area near Kyllaj. In all known sites the lichen grows on exposed limestone rock surfaces at low elevations, from just a few metres above sea level up to about 35 m.

Within these sites, Tichocyphus gotlandicus occupies very open microhabitats. It colonises the flat or gently sloping limestone along the margins of shallow rock pools and other bare rock surfaces subject to intermittent wetting and drying. The species has been collected only a few times and is described as being rarely found with fully developed fruiting bodies.
