= Heppia arenacea =

Scientific classification
- Kingdom: Fungi
- Division: Ascomycota
- Class: Lichinomycetes
- Order: Lichinales
- Family: Porocyphaceae
- Genus: Heppia
- Species: H. arenacea

Binomial name
- Heppia arenacea M.Schultz (2005)

Species of lichen

Heppia arenacea is a species of terricolous (ground-dwelling) lichen in the family Lichinaceae. Discovered in Yemen, it is characterized by its sand-coloured thallus and the incorporation of soil particles throughout its vegetative (i.e., non-reproductive) parts. The lichen is found in soil crust communities over limestone and basaltic rock in desert habitats, as well as in partially sheltered areas between large boulders.

== Taxonomy ==
Heppia arenacea was first formally described by German lichenologist Matthias Schultz in 2005. The type specimen was collected by the author in Wadi Asariah, Jabal Arays (Abyan Governorate) at an elevation of approximately 600 m (2,000 ft); there it was found growing on exposed soil over basaltic rock under an Anisotes trisulcus shrub.

== Description ==
Heppia arenacea has a sand-coloured to pale ochre thallus, which can sometimes be slightly greyish-white pruinose and is somewhat gelatinous when wet. The thallus is squamulose, resembling an areolate crust with somewhat angular to roundish squamules measuring 0.6–2.5 mm wide.

Microscopically, the lichen's thallus anatomy is heteromerous, with an upper cortex 20–35 μm thick, comprising paraplectenchymatous cells that are angulate to roundish and small, measuring 3–5 μm wide. The photobiont layer is 75–150 μm thick, consisting of vertical or irregular reticulate hyphae, with short to elongated cells measuring 7.5–12.5 by 2.5–3 μm. The photobiont of Heppia arenacea is a filamentous cyanobacterium (Scytonema), present as short and contorted filaments or split individual cells. The filament cells are 7.5–12.5 μm wide without a sheath and 10–17.5 μm wide including the sheath. The lichen lacks a lower cortex and medulla. Except for the hymenium and subhymenium, abundant soil particles are incorporated in all parts of the thallus and apothecium.

=== Similar species ===
Heppia arenacea resembles Heppia despreauxii, H. conchiloba, and H. solorinoides in the presence of an epinecral layer, a distinct upper cortex, and the lack of a lower cortex. However, it is distinguished from other Heppia species by its unique sand-colored thallus and the incorporation of soil particles in its vegetative parts.

== Habitat and distribution ==
Heppia arenacea is found in soil crust communities situated on limestone and basaltic rock in desert habitats. This lichen has been observed at elevations ranging from 200 to 2,100 m (660 to 6,890 ft) and has been recorded in a few distant regions in southern Yemen such as Djaul plateau, Ras Fartak, Jabal Arays, Wadi Raiwa, as well as on Socotra. The author suggests that the lichen may also be present in comparable habitats in Oman, Saudi Arabia, Eritrea, and Somalia. Typically, Heppia arenacea is found alongside free-living cyanobacteria (Scytonema), riccioid and marchantioid liverworts, and various soil lichens, including Collema coccophorum., Psora decipiens, Placidium spp., Toninia spp., Heppia spp., Peltula spp., and Gloeoheppia turgida.
