= Pseudocarpon =

Scientific classification
- Kingdom: Fungi
- Division: Ascomycota
- Class: Lichinomycetes
- Order: Lichinales
- Family: Porocyphaceae
- Genus: Pseudocarpon; M.Schultz & M.Prieto (2024)
- Species: P. persimile

Binomial name
- Pseudocarpon persimile M.Schultz & M.Prieto (2024)

Genus of lichens

Pseudocarpon is a fungal genus in the family Porocyphaceae. It comprises the single species Pseudocarpon persimile, a cyanolichen. Described from limestone outcrops on Gotland in Sweden, the species was later shown by molecular studies to form a distinct evolutionary line near Watsoniomyces within Porocyphaceae. The lichen forms tiny scattered patches of dark granular material on calcareous rocks, with numerous small hemispherical fruiting bodies that resemble 'fish eyes'. It grows in periodically wetted habitats and is currently confirmed from Sweden and Switzerland, though it is easily overlooked and may be confused with the similar Pyrenocarpon thelostoma.

== Taxonomy ==
The genus Pseudocarpon was created to accommodate a small black crustose lichen that had been collected from calcareous rocks in several European localities but did not fit any existing genus. The type and only known species, Pseudocarpon persimile, was described from limestone outcrops in alvar-like habitat on the island of Gotland in Sweden. The generic name alludes to the resemblance between this lichen and Pyrenocarpon thelostoma, with which it can easily be confused in the field.

Fresh collections from Gotland with hemispherical fruiting bodies (apothecia) that resemble small "fish eyes" were shown by molecular analyses to form a distinct lineage within Porocyphaceae. These samples cluster near Watsoniomyces and lie apart from Porocyphus, Paracyphus and Pyrenocarpon, despite their outward similarity. An intensive search for an existing species that matched the morphology and DNA sequences of the Gotland material failed, and so Pseudocarpon was introduced as a new genus with P. persimile as its type.

== Description ==
In Pseudocarpon persimile the thallus forms very small, scattered patches nestled among other lichens on calcareous rock. The thallus is blackish and crustose, breaking into tiny granules or minute areoles about 0.1–0.2 mm across. These areoles are very thin and are fixed to the rock by fungal filaments (rhizohyphae) that sometimes weave into a slightly gelatinous basal layer. The overall effect is of a dark, finely granular dusting on the stone surface rather than a thick, solid crust.

When viewed in section, the thallus is homoiomerous and ecorticate. This means that, instead of having a distinct outer skin (cortex) and clearly separated layers, the fungal tissue and photosynthetic partner are intermixed through most of the thickness. The fungal hyphae form a dense, reticulate mesh of short, angular cells that wrap around the cyanobacterial cells. The photobiont is a coccoid cyanobacterium with spherical to slightly flattened cells, usually one or two to a sheath. Each cell or pair of cells is enclosed in a thin, yellowish-brown gelatinous envelope, and the cyanobacteria are surrounded by hyphae that form finger-like haustoria penetrating the sheath. This combination of relatively large, single-celled cyanobacteria and stout, interlocking hyphae sets Pseudocarpon apart from some similar genera that have more delicate tissue with smaller cells.

The apothecia are numerous and usually occur one per areole. They begin as small, hemispherical structures and mature into broader, sessile cups about 0.2–0.4 mm in diameter. Each apothecium is zeorine in form: it has a low rim derived both from the thallus (thalline margin) and from a distinct internal ring of fungal tissue (the proper exciple). The outer thalline rim is shallow and rather smooth, while the inner margin is pale and thickened towards the top, becoming reddish brown at the apex. The disc itself is narrow, more or less plane rather than distinctly concave, and dark reddish brown. Internally, the hymenium is relatively low for a Porocyphaceae lichen and is underlain by a thin subhymenium. The paraphyses are straight, robust and distinctly septate; they branch and join near their tips and end in slightly widened terminal cells. The asci are narrow, club-shaped to somewhat spindle-shaped, with a slender base, and belong to the Lichina type. They are thin-walled but surrounded by a faint bluish gelatinous coat. Each ascus contains eight simple, colourless ascospores that are ellipsoid and small; the spore wall is amyloid, taking on a blue reaction in iodine.

The reproductive development of Pseudocarpon involves pycnoascocarps. Initially, the fungus forms pycnidia, which are small flask-shaped cavities that produce asexual spores (conidia). Within these structures, female reproductive hyphae (ascogones) arise beneath the pycnidial cavity. As development proceeds, the pycnidial wall thickens and becomes the proper exciple, the conidiophores disappear, and the entire structure is transformed into a sexual apothecium. The pycnidia observed in P. persimile are broadly pear-shaped and produce simple, terminal conidiophores that give rise to tiny, ellipsoid conidia. Lichen chemistry has not yet been investigated in Pseudocarpon using thin-layer chromatography.

== Habitat and distribution ==
Pseudocarpon persimile was described from limestone outcrops in alvar-like landscapes on the island of Gotland in Sweden, where it forms small patches on exposed rock surfaces. Additional collections from Gotland come from similar open, calcareous habitats, including shooting ranges and alvar areas with thin soil cover over limestone pavement. In these settings the lichen typically grows on exposed limestone that is periodically wetted by surface water.

Matching DNA haplotypes have been found in material collected on calcareous rock along the banks of the River Rhine near Basel in Switzerland, indicating that the species occurs outside Gotland. Morphologically very similar specimens have also been reported from concrete along the River Isar in Munich and from shallow rock pools in north-eastern Mallorca, although more material is needed to confirm the full extent of the species and its variation. Across this range, Pseudocarpon persimile occupies calcareous substrates near rivers and pools and can tolerate temporary inundation when water levels rise. The species is easily overlooked and can be confused with Pyrenocarpon thelostoma, Paracyphus gotlandicus or young thalli of Lemmopsis arnoldiana, and the authors suggest that further examination of herbarium material assigned to these taxa may reveal additional records of Pseudocarpon.
