= Pleopyrenis =

Scientific classification
- Kingdom: Fungi
- Division: Ascomycota
- Class: Lichinomycetes
- Order: Lichinales
- Family: Porocyphaceae
- Genus: Pleopyrenis; Clem. (1909)
- Species: P. picina

Binomial name
- Pleopyrenis picina (Nyl.) Clem. (1909)

Synonyms
- Synalissa picina Nyl. (1857); Synalissopsis picina (Nyl.) Nyl. ex Stizenb. (1882); Pyrenopsis picina (Nyl.) Forssell (1885); Collemopsis picina (Nyl.) Nyl. (1896); Psorotichia picina (Nyl.) Boistel (1903)

Single-species lichen genus

Pleopyrenis is a fungal genus in the family Porocyphaceae. It contains the single species Pleopyrenis picina, a cyanolichen. Originally described in 1857 and subsequently assigned to several different genera, the species was placed in Pleopyrenis in 1909 when its unique features were recognised. The lichen forms extremely thin, dark reddish-black film-like crusts on wet acidic rocks in mountainous regions of continental Europe. It is distinguished by its minute, mostly embedded fruiting bodies that produce dozens of small ascospores per ascus rather than the typical eight. The lichen typically grows on frequently wetted rocks along streams and seepage areas.

== Taxonomy ==
Pleopyrenis is a monospecific genus whose single species, Pleopyrenis picina, was originally described by William Nylander in 1857 as Synalissa picina from thin, dark crusts on wet rocks in the Paris region and near Vire. During the late nineteenth century the species was transferred among several small genera, being treated in turn as Synalissopsis picina, Collemopsis picina, and Psorotichia picina, before Karl Forssell transferred it to Pyrenopsis as Pyrenopsis picina in 1885. In his 1909 work "Genera of Fungi", Frederic Clements erected Pleopyrenis to accommodate this polysporous, pyrenopsoid lichen, provided only a rudimentary diagnosis and selected Pyrenopsis picina as type, thereby effecting the new combination Pleopyrenis picina.

Modern morphological and molecular studies have clarified the limits of Pleopyrenis and its relationship to these allied genera. Material traditionally assigned to Pyrenopsis has been shown to comprise several unrelated lineages, some now treated in Cladopsis and others in Allopyrenis, while Pleopyrenis picina falls outside Pyrenopsis even in its narrower modern sense. There has also been taxonomic uncertainty around polysporous species formerly placed in Pyrenopsis, such as P. grumulifera and P. pleiobola, and around the interpretation of Nylander's original material for P. picina, which includes non-lichenised algal growth and specimens referable to the Enchylium tenax group. To stabilise the current use of the name, recent authors have proposed an epitype corresponding to the thin, crustose lichen with polysporous asci that occurs on wet, acidic rocks, and have accordingly reinstated Pleopyrenis as the appropriate genus for this taxon.

== Description ==
Pleopyrenis picina forms a very thin, dark reddish-black crust on rock. Its thallus is film-like and can be more or less continuous or cracked into a mosaic of small, angular patches only a fraction of a millimetre across and little more than a tenth of a millimetre thick. It is attached to the rock by a delicate, gelatinous base. In vertical section the thallus is homoiomerous, meaning that fungal and algal components are mixed rather than forming distinct layers, and it lacks a protective outer cortex. The fungal hyphae weave a fine network around the cells of the photobiont, which is a gloeocapsoid cyanobacterium: the cyanobacterial cells are more or less spherical (globose), occur singly or in pairs, and are surrounded by reddish, jelly-like sheaths that form vertically arranged packets. Finger-like fungal haustoria penetrate these packets to access nutrients from the cyanobacteria. No lichen substances have been detected by thin-layer chromatography.

The sexual reproductive structures are minute and numerous. The apothecia are perithecioid, meaning that they resemble tiny, flask-shaped structures immersed in the thallus, and are mostly sunk within or only slightly raised above the surface. They are less than a quarter of a millimetre in diameter and have a shallow, thalline rim formed by the surrounding lichen tissue (lecanorine apothecia). The exposed disc is punctiform, usually slightly concave and dark reddish brown. Internally, the hymenium is relatively tall and stains deep blue with iodine–potassium iodide after treatment with potassium hydroxide (IKI+ blue), indicating an amyloid reaction. The paraphyses are distinct and initially straight but later become branched and form a reticulate network. The asci are club-shaped, thin-walled (unitunicate) with an apical extension and a well-developed, iodine-positive apical dome surrounded by a gelatinous cap. They are polysporous, typically containing a few dozen small, colourless, broadly ellipsoid spores. Asexual reproduction occurs in pycnidia, which are broadly pear-shaped cavities embedded in the thallus; these produce simple conidiophores that bear tiny, ellipsoid conidia at their tips.

== Habitat and distribution ==
Pleopyrenis is known from a wide range of mountainous regions in continental Europe, including the Pyrenees, the Black Forest, the northern Alps, the Ore Mountains and the Giant Mountains. It grows on acidic rocks in situations where the substrate is frequently wet. Typical habitats include rock surfaces that are temporarily or seasonally inundated along clear, fast-flowing streams, as well as inclined rock faces kept moist by seepage water. The lichen usually occurs in open, well-lit situations where water movement and regular wetting create a cool, humid microhabitat on otherwise nutrient-poor stone.
