= Lecidopyrenopsis =

Scientific classification
- Kingdom: Fungi
- Division: Ascomycota
- Class: Lichinomycetes
- Order: Lichinales
- Family: Porocyphaceae
- Genus: Lecidopyrenopsis; Vain. (1907)

Type species
- Lecidopyrenopsis corticola Vain. (1907)

Single-species fungal genus

Lecidopyrenopsis is a fungal genus in the family Porocyphaceae. It is a monospecific genus, containing the single species Lecidopyrenopsis corticola. This species is one of the few bark-dwelling members of Porocyphaceae and has a pantropical distribution, with records from Thailand, Costa Rica, French Guiana, Seychelles and Taiwan.

== Taxonomy ==
The genus Lecidopyrenopsis was circumscribed by the Finnish lichenologist Edvard August Vainio in 1907, with Lecidopyrenopsis corticola as the sole species. The type specimen was collected from bark on palms on Koh Chang island (Thailand). In his original description, Vainio characterised the genus as having lecideine fruiting bodies (apothecia) that differ from Pyrenopsis in their structure and spore characteristics. He noted that the genus produces a crustose thallus with distinctive areolate (divided into small patches) structure and apothecia with pale to pale-brownish discs.

Vainio distinguished Lecidopyrenopsis from the closely related genus Pyrenopsis primarily by the lecideine nature of the apothecia and differences in spore morphology. The species was described from specimens collected on palm trunks near Lem Dan on Ko Chang island (now in Thailand). The genus name reflects its intermediate position between Lecidea and Pyrenopsis, combining elements that relate to both genera.

Molecular phylogenetics studies have confirmed Lecidopyrenopsis as a distinct monotypic genus within the Lichinomycetes. A 2024 phylogenetic analysis found that L. corticola clusters at the base of a clade containing species of Pyrenopsis (in the loose sense, sensu lato) that have been transferred to the genus Cladopsis. The study confirmed that Lecidopyrenopsis can be distinguished from Cladopsis species by its biatorine apothecia and the presence of a distinctive hyphal collar that surrounds the coralloid thallus granules.

== Habitat and distribution ==
Lecidopyrenopsis corticola is one of the few corticolous (bark-dwelling) members of the family Lichiniaceae. In addition to its type locality in Thailand, it has been recorded from Costa Rica, French Guyana, Seychelles, and Taiwan, indicating a pantropical distribution.
