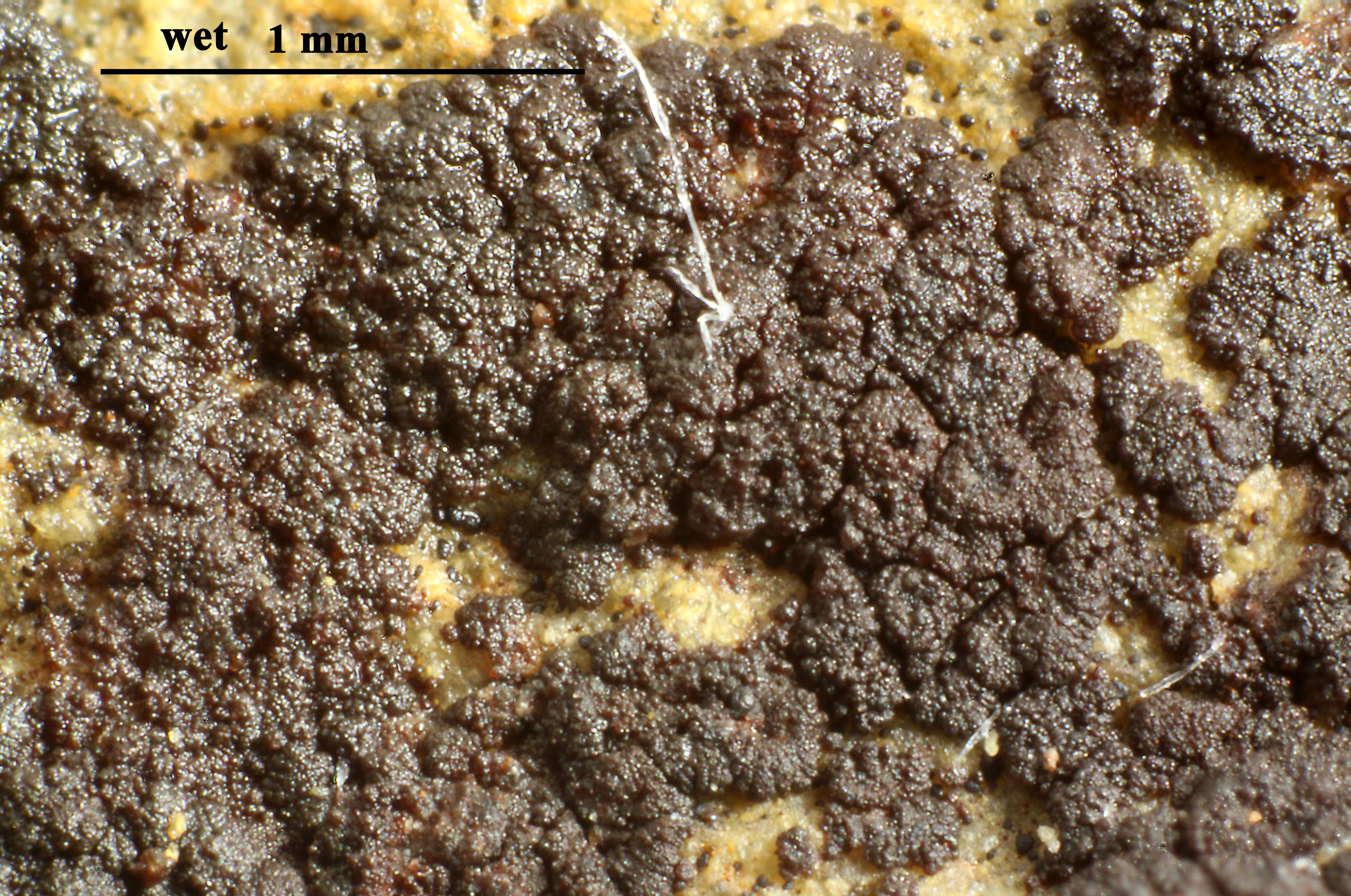

Scientific classification
- Kingdom: Fungi
- Division: Ascomycota
- Class: Lichinomycetes
- Order: Lichinales
- Family: Porocyphaceae
- Genus: Cladopsis
- Species: C. triptococca

Binomial name
- Cladopsis triptococca (Nyl.) Nyl. (1886)

Synonyms
- Pyrenopsis triptococca Nyl. (1881)

= Cladopsis triptococca =

Species of lichen-forming fungus

Cladopsis triptococca is a species of lichen-forming fungus in the family Porocyphaceae. It forms a thin, dark, irregularly granular crust on acidic rock surfaces. The species is widespread in warm, dry regions, with records from the Iberian Peninsula, north-western Africa, the Canary Islands, the Azores, south-western North America, South Africa, India, and South Korea. It was first described by William Nylander in 1881 from coastal rocks at Porto, Portugal, and was raised to its current generic placement in 2024. Nylander had originally noted that the species did not fit comfortably within Pyrenopsis, and placed it in a distinct subgenus that was later re-established as the genus Cladopsis.

== Taxonomy ==
The lichen was first formally described as a new species in 1881 by the Finnish lichenologist William Nylander, as Pyrenopsis triptococca. The protologue was based on material collected by the English bryologist Isaac Newton (1840–1906) on coastal rocks at Porto (Portugal), and Nylander wrote that the species resembled Pyrenopsis concordatula in general appearance, but could be distinguished by its thin, dark thallus, which breaks into minute warted areoles and becomes very finely granular when wet, together with its tiny apothecia and ellipsoid spores. He also remarked that it did not fit comfortably within Pyrenopsis in the strict sense, describing the thallus as somewhat fruticose and placing the species in a distinct subgenus, Cladopsis.

In a later review of the group, the lichenologist Aino Henssen noted that Nylander's subgenus Cladopsis also included Synalissa conferta and that Auguste-Marie Hue subsequently treated Cladopsis at generic rank. Henssen nevertheless interpreted C. triptococca in the older, broader concept of Pyrenopsis, a choice consistent with the unsettled generic limits that persisted before modern phylogenetic work clarified the group. That uncertainty was resolved in part by the 2024 reclassification of the Lichinomycetes, in which Prieto and colleagues found that P. triptococca, together with allied species such as P. foederata and P. polycocca, formed a distinct clade separate from Pyrenopsis in the narrower sense, and they therefore re-established Cladopsis as a genus. In the same study, P. triptococca was treated as the type species of Cladopsis and selected as the lectotype of Pyrenopsis subgenus Cladopsis, linking Nylander's subgeneric concept with the modern generic name.

== Description ==
The thallus of C. triptococca is irregularly granular and cracked into small patches (granulose-areolate), with a few very small, partly raised (semi-sessile) apothecia whose blackish discs range from pinpoint-sized to slightly opened. The areoles at the margins are often somewhat radiating (effigurate), although some specimens are more uniformly granular—a difference that may correspond to variation in the texture of the acidic rock substrate.

== Distribution and habitat ==
Cladopsis triptococca is a widespread lichen known from the Iberian Peninsula, north-western Africa (Tunisia), the Canary Islands, the Azores, and south-western North America. In Asia, it has been reported from Uttar Pradesh (India), and from South Korea. A 2025 survey of lichens in a fynbos area near Stanford, in the Western Cape of South Africa, recorded the species in Restionaceae vegetation on periodically irrigated low rock outcrops at 200–220 m elevation.

In the Upper Douro region of north-east Portugal, the species has been recorded from exposed schist and quartzite surfaces in rain-track lichen communities. There it occurred with several species of Peltula and other lichens of dry siliceous rock faces. In the Côa Valley Archaeological Park of north-east Portugal, the species was recorded on vertical schist surfaces, where it was associated particularly with the lichen-rich communities of the more exposed south-east-facing slopes. In that study it was treated as part of a pioneer assemblage of thin, dark gelatinous lichens on dry rock faces. A 1996 biogeographical study of south-eastern Spain placed the species in the Macaronesian–west Mediterranean element, a dry-region lichen flora centred on the western Mediterranean and Macaronesia.
