= Gyrocollema =

Scientific classification
- Kingdom: Fungi
- Division: Ascomycota
- Class: Lichinomycetes
- Order: Lichinales
- Family: Porocyphaceae
- Genus: Gyrocollema; Vain. (1929)

Type species
- Gyrocollema scyphuliferum Vain. (1929)

Species
- G. rupestrinum G. scyphuliferum

Genus of fungi

Gyrocollema is a small genus of cyanolichens placed in the family Porocyphaceae. A 2024 multilocus study of the class Lichinomycetes emended Porocyphaceae and provisionally included Gyrocollema in that family; earlier sources classified it in Lichinaceae. Species are tiny, dark lichens associated with cyanobacteria and typically occur on rock in well-lit sites that are intermittently wet. Two names are widely cited, though the circumscription and family placement remain tentative pending additional sampling.

The genus, which was originally erected by the Finnish lichenologist Edvard August Vainio in 1929, comprises two species:

- Gyrocollema rupestrinum (Zahlbr.) Henssen (1986)
- Gyrocollema scyphuliferum Vain. (1929)
