= Calotrichopsis =

Scientific classification
- Kingdom: Fungi
- Division: Ascomycota
- Class: Lichinomycetes
- Order: Lichinales
- Family: Porocyphaceae
- Genus: Calotrichopsis; Vain. (1890)

Type species
- Calotrichopsis insignis Vain. (1890)

Species
- C. filiformis C. granulosa C. insignis C. rivae

Genus of lichens

Calotrichopsis is a small genus of cyanolichens placed in the family Porocyphaceae. The genus was originally circumscribed by the Finnish lichenologist Edvard August Vainio in 1896. A 2024 multilocus study of the class Lichinomycetes emended Porocyphaceae and provisionally included Calotrichopsis in that family; earlier references had kept the genus in Lichinaceae. Species are minute, dark-coloured lichens partnered with cyanobacteria and are typically found on rock or soil in open, intermittently wet microhabitats. The family placement is considered tentative pending additional molecular sampling.

== Species ==
- Calotrichopsis filiformis Henssen (1963)
- Calotrichopsis granulosa Henssen (1963)
- Calotrichopsis insignis Vain. (1890)
- Calotrichopsis rivae Sambo (1937)
