= Lempholemma corticola =

Scientific classification
- Kingdom: Fungi
- Division: Ascomycota
- Class: Lichinomycetes
- Order: Lichinales
- Family: Porocyphaceae
- Genus: Lempholemma
- Species: L. corticola

Binomial name
- Lempholemma corticola M.Schultz & T.Sprib. (2011)
- Holotype: Fassas Valley, Crete

Species of lichen

Lempholemma corticola is a species of corticolous (bark-dwelling) crustose lichen in the family Lecanoraceae. It occurs in Greece.

== Taxonomy ==
It was described as new to science in 2011 by the lichenologists Matthias Schultz and Toby Spribille. The type was collected by Spribille in the Fassas Valley between Langos and Nea Roumata (western Crete), where it was found growing on the bark of Platanus orientalis. The specific epithet refers to this corticolous lifestyle, which is unusual in the genus Lempholemma. Another example of a bark-dwelling species in the genus is Lempholemma syreniarum.

== Description ==
Lempholemma corticola has a blackish olive-coloured thallus (main body) that lacks a true cortex (outer protective layer) or has a false cortex (pseudocortex) on its granules and reproductive structures. When wet, it becomes gelatinous. The thallus has a distinctive granular to irregularly areolate texture, with granules measuring about 65–165 μm in width. These granules initially appear scattered (effuse) but later aggregate to form irregularly shaped areoles measuring 0.6–2.5 mm wide, giving the thallus a very uneven appearance. The organism attaches to its substrate via pale rhizohyphae (fungal filaments that function like roots). Neither isidia nor soralia (propagules for asexual reproduction) are present.

The reproductive structures (apothecia) are small, measuring 0.25–0.37 mm, somewhat globular in shape, and attached directly to the surface (adnate) with a slightly constricted base or on a short stalk (stipitate). The disc initially appears as a tiny point (punctiform) but eventually opens, displaying a pale brownish, flat surface. The thalline margin (rim of tissue surrounding the disc) is thin, measuring 25–30 μm in thickness, and soon recedes. The proper excipulum (inner margin) is thin but distinct, composed of a few interwoven hyphae and pale in colour. It measures about 5 μm thick at the base, approximately 10 μm thick at the sides, and widens at the top, appearing as a pale ring when viewed from above.

The hymenium (spore-producing layer) is clear and measures 110–120 μm in height, turning blue when treated with potassium hydroxide and iodine (KOH/IKI+ blue). The paraphyses (sterile filaments among the spore sacs) are distinct, sparsely branched, and widened at their tips. The asci (spore sacs) are broadly cylindrical to obclavate in shape, measuring 75–80 by 12–15 μm, with a thin wall that does not react with iodine (not amyloid) and a tip that is not thickened. Each ascus contains eight ascospores (fungal spores), which are simple, ellipsoid to broadly ellipsoid, colourless, and typical measure 13–19 by 6.5-8 μm. The reproductive structures develop from a tangle of generative hyphae. The photobiont (photosynthetic partner) is Nostoc, which forms bead-like chains. No secondary metabolites have been detected in this species.
