= Euopsis =

Scientific classification
- Kingdom: Fungi
- Division: Ascomycota
- Family: Harpidiaceae
- Genus: Euopsis; Nyl. (1881)

Type species
- Euopsis granatina (Sommerf.) Nyl. (1881)

Species
- E. granatina E. pulvinata

Genus of lichens

Euopsis is a small genus of lichen-forming fungi in the family Harpidiaceae. The genus contains two species. The genus was established in 1881 by the Finnish lichenologist William Nylander, who transferred species from the genus Pyrenopsis based on differences in their reproductive structures. These lichens form dark reddish-brown crusts that become jelly-like when wet and grow primarily on damp, acidic rock faces and mossy surfaces.

== Taxonomy ==
The genus was circumscribed by Finnish botanist William Nylander in 1881. Nylander established Euopsis after determining that certain species previously placed in Pyrenopsis differed significantly in the form and structure of their apothecia. He transferred Pyrenopsis haemaleuca and P. granulatina to the new genus based on these morphological distinctions. In his description, Nylander noted the taxonomic complexity surrounding related genera, observing that Stictis forms well-developed apothecia similar to those found in parmeliaceous lichens, with distinctive marginal features. He suggested that the establishment of subgenera might be appropriate given the morphological variation he observed across these related groups. Nylander did not designate a type species for the genus; the type, E. granatina, was designated by Gerhard Eigler in 1969.

== Description ==
Euopsis forms a dark reddish-brown crust that ranges from a granular film to a patchwork of minute, scale-like lobes. When damp the thallus absorbs water and takes on a gelatinous consistency. It lacks a distinct protective cortex; instead, the fungal hyphae weave around the photobiont in a loose mesh, though pockets of tissue can become more brick-like (pseudoparenchymatous) where a green alga replaces the usual cyanobacterium. The principal photobiont is Gloeocapsa, whose single cells or small clusters near the surface are wrapped in reddish-brown jelly that turns purplish in the K spot test. Some specimens also harbour Trebouxia, a more conventional green alga.

Reproductive bodies are glossy-brown apothecia that sit flush with the thallus. Each bears a well-raised rim of thallus tissue, while the encircling wall (exciple) is narrow and composed of tightly parallel hyphae. A pale-brown epithecium covers a colourless hymenium that shows no iodine staining reaction (I−). Beneath lies a colourless to faintly brown hypothecium of tangled hyphae. Slender paraphyses thread the hymenium; they branch only sparingly and never swell at the tips. Cylindrical, thick-walled asci contain eight ascospores apiece; both the inner ascus wall and the tholus stain blue in the potassium-iodide reagent (K/I+), yet the tiny apical dome does not. The spores are smooth, ellipsoidal, single-celled and colourless, with no extra outer coat.

Asexual propagation occurs in sunken pycnidia scattered through the thallus. Inside, chains of elongate, flask-shaped conidiogenous cells bud off rod-like, colourless conidia. Thin-layer chromatography has so far failed to detect any secondary metabolites (lichen products) in the genus.

== Ecology ==
Species of Euopsis grow chiefly on damp, acidic rock faces but can also spread over cushions of moss, thin soil, or patches of peaty debris in similarly moist settings.

== Species ==
- Euopsis granatina (Sommerf.) Nyl. (1881)
- Euopsis pulvinata (Schaer.) Vain. (1881)
