= Pseudoheppia =

Scientific classification
- Kingdom: Fungi
- Division: Ascomycota
- Class: Lichinomycetes
- Order: Lichinales
- Family: Porocyphaceae
- Genus: Pseudoheppia; Zahlbr. (1903)
- Species: P. schuleri

Binomial name
- Pseudoheppia schuleri Zahlbr. (1903)

Single-species lichen genus

Pseudoheppia is a fungal genus in the family Porocyphaceae. It contains a single species, Pseudoheppia schuleri, a saxicolous (rock-dwelling) squamulose lichen.

== Taxonomy ==
Both the genus Pseudoheppia and its sole species were introduced to science in 1903 by the Austrian lichenologist Alexander Zahlbruckner. The species epithet honours the lichenologist Johann Alois Ernst Schuler, who collected the type species. He collected the type near Fiume (the old name for the city of Rijeka) in Croatia, specifically on dolomitic limestone. The type specimen is now housed in the herbarium of the Natural History Museum in Vienna.

Pseudoheppia was previously classified in the family Heppiaceae, and later treated within Lichinaceae. In 2024, María Prieto, Mats Wedin and Matthias Schultz placed Heppiaceae, Ephebaceae and Pyrenopsidaceae in synonymy under an emended Porocyphaceae, which now includes Pseudoheppia. The family placement is considered provisional pending additional molecular sampling.

== Description ==
Genus Pseudoheppia features a squamulose (scaly) thallus. The thallus lacks rhizines (root-like structures often used by lichens to anchor themselves to their substrate); instead, the lichen attaches to the surface through medullary hyphae, which are fungal filaments found in the inner layer of the thallus. The structure of the thallus is homoeomerous, meaning it has a uniform texture throughout, without distinct layers. Pseudoheppia does not have a gelatinous texture (contrasting it with many other members of the Lichinaceae), a protective outer cortex, or pseudoparenchymatous tissue.

The hyphae within the thallus are densely packed, and the lichen contains a type of cyanobacteria called Scytonema as its photobiont (the photosynthetic partner in the lichen symbiosis). These cyanobacterial cells are bluish-green and are arranged in clustered chains, contributing to the overall structure and appearance of the thallus.

The apothecia (fruiting bodies) are embedded within the thallus and remain immersed throughout their development. These apothecia lack a distinct outer layer, and the base layer of the thallus, the hypothallus, is pale in colour. The lichen produces simple, colourless spores, with eight spores typically found in each spore-producing structure. Pycnoconidia (asexual reproductive structures), which are common in some lichens, have not been observed to occur in Pseudoheppia.

Pseudoheppia can be distinguished from the closely related genus Heppia by its lack of pseudoparenchymatous tissue in the thallus, which is a key difference in its structure.
