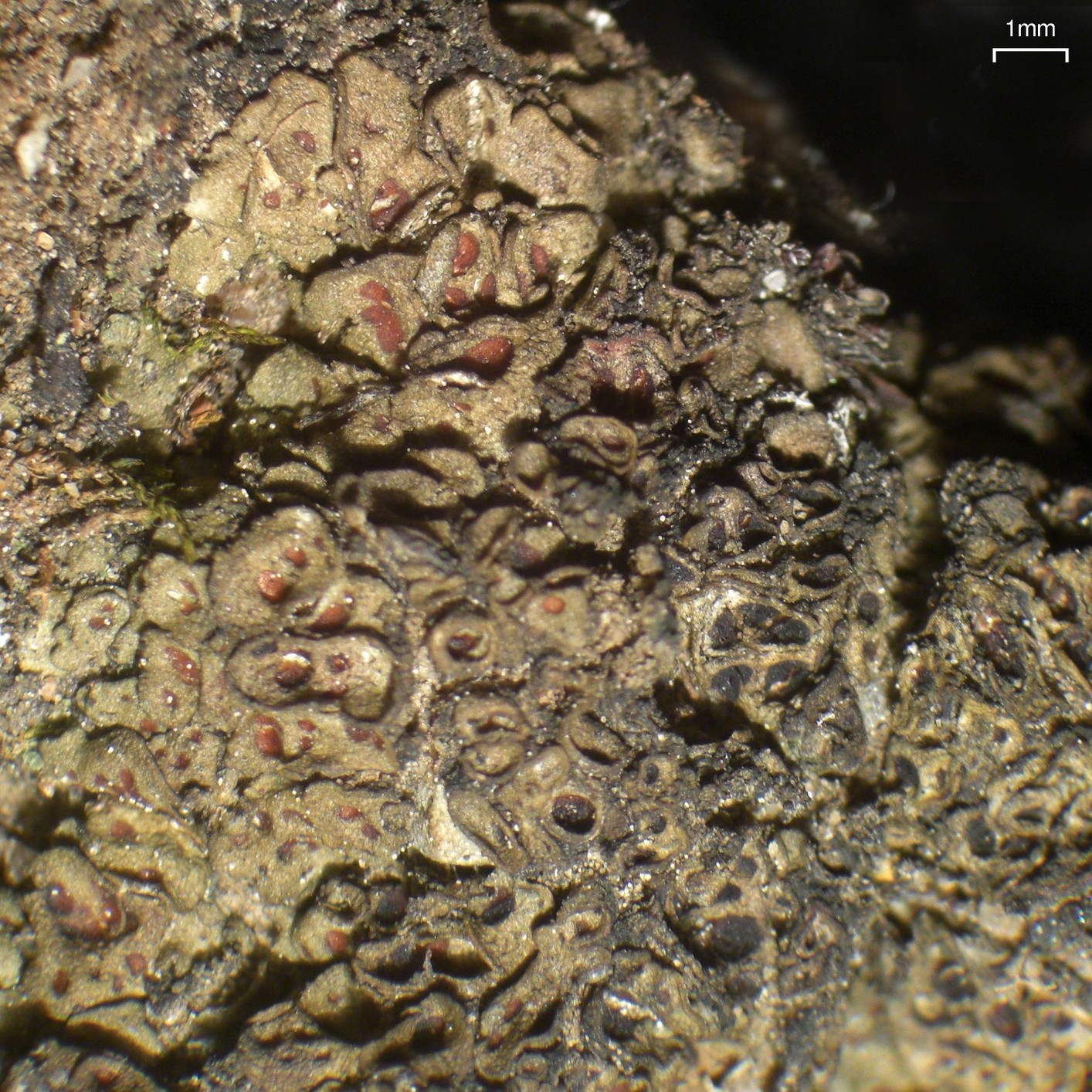

Scientific classification
- Kingdom: Fungi
- Division: Ascomycota
- Class: Lichinomycetes
- Order: Lichinales
- Family: Porocyphaceae
- Genus: Heppia
- Species: H. lutosa

Binomial name
- Heppia lutosa (Ach.) Nyl. (1869)

Synonyms
- List: Collema lutosum Ach. (1814); Pannaria lutosa (Ach.) Nyl. (1857); Heppia urceolata var. lutosa (Ach.) Boistel (1903); Physma sanguinolentum Kremp. (1865); Collema sanguinolentum Kremp. ex Stizenb. (1882); Heppia virescens f. sanguinolenta (Kremp. ex Stizenb.) Arnold (1884); Heppia despreauxii f. sanguinolenta (Kremp. ex Stizenb.) Zahlbr. (1925); Heppia brisbanensis F.Wilson (1891)

= Heppia lutosa =

Species of lichen-forming fungus

Heppia lutosa is a species of jelly lichen in the family Porocyphaceae. The species forms small scaly lobes up to 10 mm across that are attached to the substrate by a central point, with a dark olive upper surface and a pale to reddish-brown underside. It occurs in Africa, Europe, and North America.

== Taxonomy ==
The species was first scientifically described in 1814 by Erik Acharius, who named it Collema lutosum based on material growing on muddy soil in Germany; in his brief Latin diagnosis he characterised it as a crustose, cracked, areolate-lobate and wrinkled, yellowish-green lichen with large immersed apothecia whose discs are flat to slightly convex and become pale reddish when moist. William Nylander reclassified the species in Heppia in 1869.

== Description ==
Heppia lutosa has a squamulose (scaly) thallus made up of small, leaf-like lobes that are rounded to irregularly lobed and measure up to about 10 mm across. The squamules are attached to the substrate by a central umbilicus and range from flat or slightly wavy to distinctly convex, with margins that typically curve downwards. The upper surface is smooth and dark olive in colour, underlain by a thin surface layer. The underside is also smooth, and varies from pale flesh-brown to deep reddish or almost blackish brown; its cortex is formed of paraplectenchymatous tissue that may appear palisade-like and is about 10–50 (sometimes up to 75) micrometres thick. The medulla is differentiated into an upper zone containing the photobiont, which occupies about one-quarter to three-quarters of the medullary depth, and a lower zone of loose, algae-free fungal hyphae.

Asexual reproduction occurs through soredia, which are produced in usually well-defined soralia situated either along the margins or across the surfaces of the squamules. Sexual fruiting bodies (apothecia) are commonly numerous on each squamule; they are immersed in the thallus so that only the disc is visible at the surface, ranging from punctiform (point-like) to about 0.7 mm in diameter. The ascospores are ellipsoid and relatively small, measuring about 6–8 by 3–5 μm.

== Habitat and distribution ==
Heppia lutosa has been documented from Africa, Europe, and North America.
