= Thyrea =

Thyrea may refer to:

- Thyrea (lichen), a genus of lichens in the family Lichinaceae
- Thyrea (Greece), a city of ancient Greece
