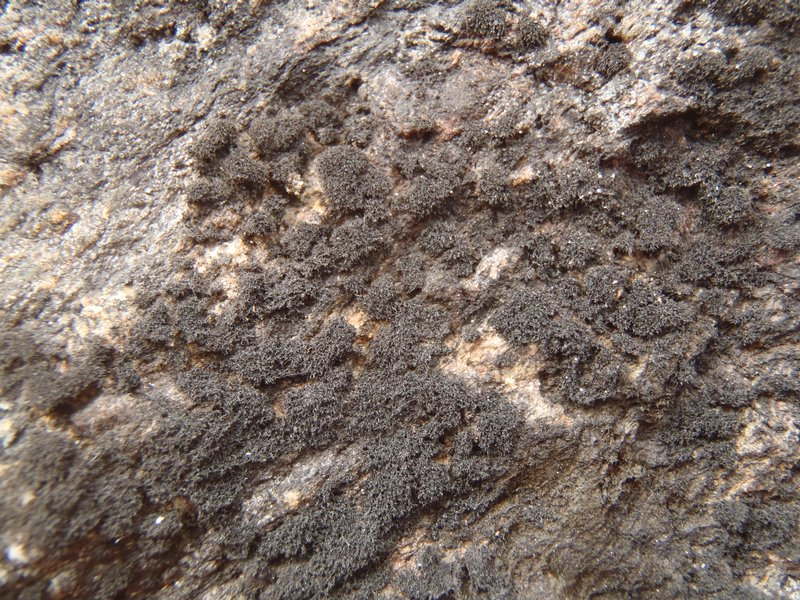
- Thermutis velutina

Scientific classification
- Kingdom: Fungi
- Division: Ascomycota
- Class: Lichinomycetes
- Order: Lichinales
- Family: Porocyphaceae
- Genus: Thermutis; Fr. (1825)

Type species
- Thermutis velutina (Ach.) Flot. (1850)

Species
- T. compacta T. velutina

= Thermutis =

Genus of lichen-forming fungi

Thermutis is a small genus of cyanolichens in the family Porocyphaceae. It was formerly treated in Lichinaceae, but a 2024 multilocus re-classification of the class Lichinomycetes emended Porocyphaceae and included Thermutis there. Species are minute, dark lichens with ecorticate, often gelatinous to squamulose thalli that occur on rock or soil in open, periodically wet microhabitats. Their sexual structures commonly develop as pycnoascocarps; the asci are prototunicate and the ascospores simple and colourless.

The genus comprises two species: Thermutis compacta and Thermutis velutina.
