= Gyrotrema papillatum =

Scientific classification
- Kingdom: Fungi
- Division: Ascomycota
- Class: Lecanoromycetes
- Order: Graphidales
- Family: Graphidaceae
- Genus: Gyrotrema
- Species: G. papillatum

Binomial name
- Gyrotrema papillatum Lücking (2011)
- Holotype site: Corcovado National Park , Costa Rica

Species of lichen

Gyrotrema papillatum is a little-known species of corticolous (bark-dwelling), crustose lichen in the family Harpidiaceae. It is known from a single collection in a lowland rainforest region of Costa Rica.

== Taxonomy ==
Gyrotrema papillatum was described as new to science in 2011 by the German lichenologist Robert Lücking. The type specimen of this lichen was collected by the author in Costa Rica, in the Los Patos section of Corcovado National Park (Puntarenas Province). This location is part of the Osa Conservation Area on the Osa Peninsula, situated approximately 160 km (99 mi) southeast of San José and 40 km (25 mi) west-southwest of Golfito; there, in a lowland rainforest zone, at an elevation between 100 and 300 m (330 and 980 ft), it was found growing on the bark of a partially shaded lower tree trunk. At the time of its original publication, the lichen was only known from the type locality. It species epithet alludes to the papillate nature of its thallus (i.e., covered with papillae, which are small, conically rounded growths).

== Description ==
Gyrotrema papillatum has a grey-green to olive-green thallus adorned with numerous white papillae. The cortex is prosoplectenchymatous–made of a dense, tightly interwoven layer of fungal hyphae. The photobiont layer and the medulla beneath often contain clusters of calcium oxalate crystals. The apothecia of G. papillatum are prominent, with a rounded to lobate shape, measuring 1–1.5 mm in diameter. The exposed disc of the apothecia is a cinnabar-red colour. Around this disc, the margin is lobulate to recurved and fused, sharing the same cinnabar-red hue on the inside. This species lacks a columella, but instead has concentric rings of excipular tissue that separate rings of old hymenia. The youngest hymenium ring is situated closest to the margin. The excipulum is prosoplectenchymatous and carbonised, and lacks periphysoids. The hymenium stands 80–100 μm high, and the paraphyses are unbranched.

Each ascus contains eight ascospores that have between 5 and 9 septa (internal partitions), measuring 25–30 by 6–8 μm. These ellipsoid spores have thick septa and lens-shaped lumina, are colourless, and has a violet-blue reaction when treated with iodine (amyloid reaction). The apothecial disc contains an unidentified type of anthraquinone substance.
