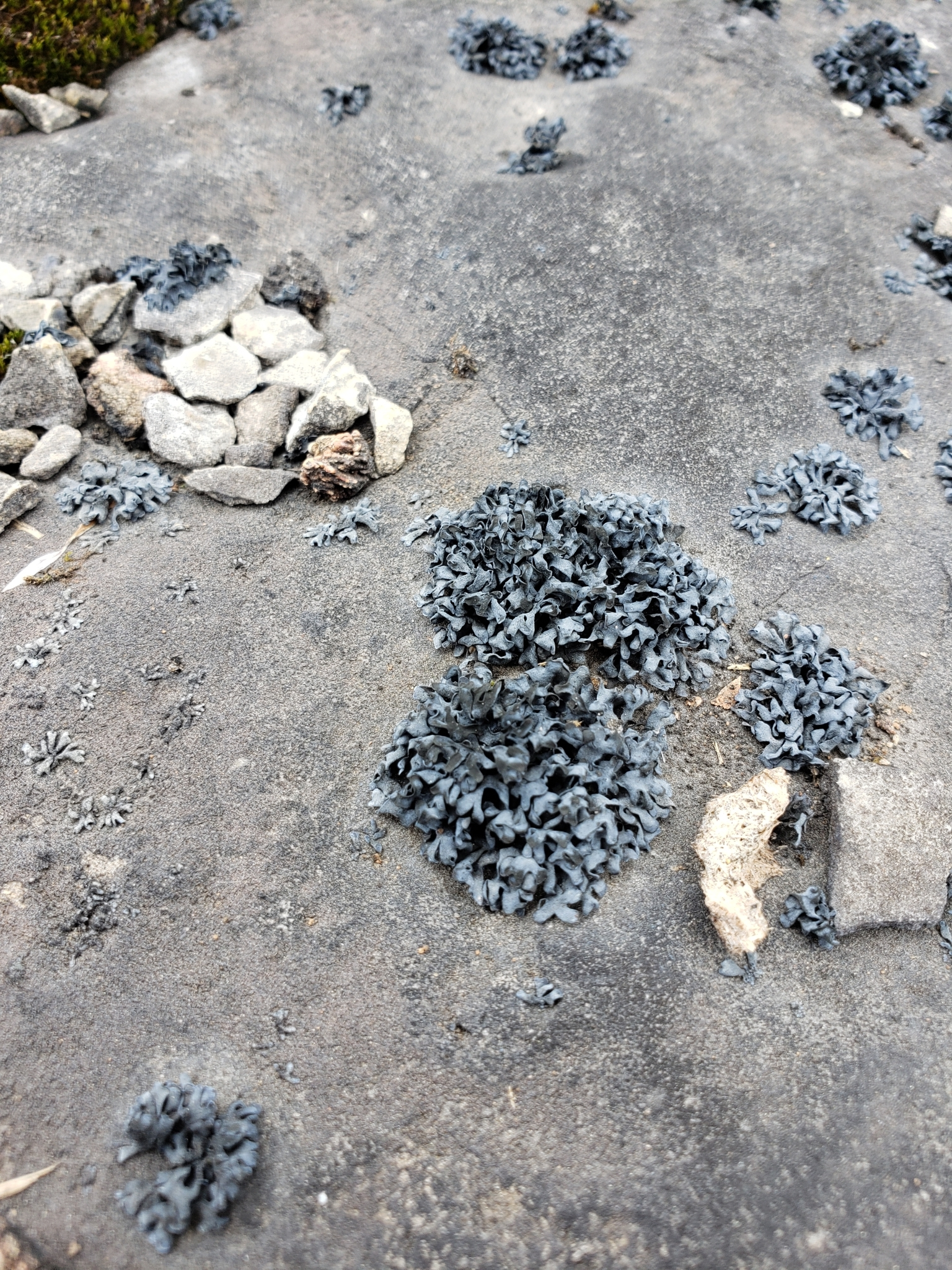

Conservation status
- Apparently Secure (NatureServe)

Scientific classification
- Kingdom: Fungi
- Division: Ascomycota
- Class: Lichinomycetes
- Order: Lichinales
- Family: Porocyphaceae
- Genus: Thyrea
- Species: T. confusa

Binomial name
- Thyrea confusa Henssen (1990)

= Thyrea confusa =

Species of lichen-forming fungus

Thyrea confusa is a species of cyanolichen in the family Lichinaceae. The species was formally described in 1990 to provide a correct name for Mediterranean rock-dwelling lichens that had been previously misidentified under an incorrect species name. Thyrea confusa grows as dark, lobed patches on moist calcareous rock faces, typically in Mediterranean climates, and reproduces through both spores and tiny vegetative outgrowths that allow it to spread asexually. The species has a scattered but wide distribution across southern Europe, western Asia, and North America, occurring on limestone and other base-rich rock substrates where cyanolichen communities are common.

== Taxonomy ==
Thyrea confusa was described as a new species by Aino Henssen in 1990. It was based on material collected from calcareous rock faces at Les Baumettes, Collet de Brousse, in the Vaucluse department of Provence, France; this collection was designated as the holotype, with additional material from Mireval in Hérault distributed in Antonín Vězda's exsiccata series as a paratype.

Henssen introduced the name T. confusa to provide a valid designation for material that had long been referred to as Thyrea pulvinata. Study of the original type specimen of T. pulvinata showed that it does not belong in Thyrea at all, but represents a taxon allied to Lichinella iodopulchra. The Mediterranean, lobed Thyrea growing on moist calcareous rocks, which had been going under the misapplied name T. pulvinata in modern collections and exsiccatae, therefore lacked a legitimate name and was described as T. confusa.

== Description ==
The thallus (lichen body) of Thyrea confusa is olive-black to black and often has a slightly frosted (pruinose), powdery-looking surface. Young thalli form small rosettes, but with age they become somewhat tufted or shrubby, developing into patches up to about 2 cm across. The lichen is divided into flattened, tongue-like lobes 1–3 mm wide that are irregularly to dichotomously cut towards the tips. These lobes often carry numerous tiny, nearly spherical isidia—minute outgrowths that act as vegetative propagules—about 7–20 (rarely up to 30) micrometres (μm) in diameter.

In vertical section the thallus is relatively thick for a crustose lichen, about 0.24–0.30 mm deep. The internal tissue is built from slender fungal hyphae 1–2.5 micrometres (μm) thick that run more or less parallel in the centre and form a loose network nearer the surface. The photosynthetic partner is a unicellular cyanobacterium belonging to the Chroococcales; its cells are 3–8 μm in diameter and occur singly rather than in chains.

Fruiting bodies are small, dark pycnoascocarps, which are structures that function as apothecia (disc-like sexual fruiting bodies) but arise from organs that initially resemble pycnidia. They occur along the lobe margins or on the upper surface, are first immersed in the thallus and later slightly raised, and reach up to about 0.25 mm across. In section, the hymenium (spore-bearing layer) stains blue with iodine, indicating an amyloid reaction. The asci are cylindrical and produce eight spores each. These ascospores are colourless and ellipsoid in shape, small for the family, and typically measure between 8 and 12 μm long by 6 to 7 μm wide, though some specimens range slightly outside these dimensions. The lichen also produces very small, rod-shaped conidia about 2–2.5 × 1 μm.

== Habitat and distribution ==
Thyrea confusa is known from calcareous rock faces in southern France. The type collection was made on limestone cliffs at Les Baumettes, Collet de Brousse in the Vaucluse, where the lichen grows in moist seepage zones on otherwise dry rock walls. Additional material has been collected near Mireval in the Hérault department, at about 50 m altitude, where it occurs on low-lying limestone outcrops and was previously distributed under the misapplied name Thyrea pulvinata in Vězda's exsiccata.

Further records indicate that Thyrea confusa has a scattered but wide distribution across Eurasia and the Americas. In Eurasia it has been reported from saxicolous communities on calcareous outcrops in Golestan National Park in north-eastern Iran, from calcareous rock faces in the Iğdır region of eastern Turkey, from carbonate gullies in the Orenburg Nature Reserve in the Southern Urals, and from Collematetea cristati "black-zone" cyanobacterial lichen communities on damp limestone cliffs in the Dnister Canyon of western Ukraine. It has also been recorded on limestone outcrops in the southern Russian Far East (Primorye Territory and Sakhalin), where recent surveys list it among species newly reported for that region.

In North America T. confusa occurs on bare limestone, dolomite and other base-rich rocks at scattered sites in the Mojave Desert of California and desert ranges in the Greater Sonoran Desert region of Arizona, where it can be locally common on basalt or calcareous substrates but remains generally rare and patchily collected. The species has moreover been documented from the Serra da Bodoquena in central-west Brazil, where it is cited as the second member of the genus recorded from the country in a study of cyanolichens on rocky outcrops.
