= Paracyphus =

Scientific classification
- Kingdom: Fungi
- Division: Ascomycota
- Class: Lichinomycetes
- Order: Lichinales
- Family: Porocyphaceae
- Genus: Paracyphus; M.Schultz & M.Prieto (2024)
- Species: P. gotlandicus

Binomial name
- Paracyphus gotlandicus M.Schultz & M.Prieto (2024)

Single-species fungal genus

Paracyphus is a fungal genus in the family Porocyphaceae. It contains the single species Paracyphus gotlandicus, a rock-dwelling cyanolichen. The genus was established in 2024 as part of a comprehensive molecular phylogenetics-informed reclassification of the fungal class Lichinomycetes. Paracyphus gotlandicus is a minute, dark lichen that grows on exposed rock surfaces in nutrient-poor limestone habitats, where it forms tiny patches barely visible to the naked eye, and it is known only from the Swedish island of Gotland.

== Taxonomy ==
The genus name Paracyphus was published by Matthias Schultz and María Prieto in 2024 within a revised framework for Lichinomycetes, a class that the authors showed to contain extensive non-monophyly under historic, morphology-only classifications. Their study erected or resurrected numerous genera and issued dozens of new combinations; among the novelties was Paracyphus with P. gotlandicus designated as the type and only species. In the same work, Porocyphaceae was emended to encompass a large, well-supported clade that includes Paracyphus and several other cyanobacterial lichen genera. The generic rank and family placement were grounded in shared character suites and in the phylogeny; the authors emphasised ascoma development and ascus type alongside molecular data when delimiting lineages.

== Description ==
Paracyphus was circumscribed among the small, dark cyanolichens characteristic of Porocyphaceae. Members of this family, as emended by the 2024 study, typically have thalli that are gelatinous when wet and dry to thin crusts or minute squamules, partner with cyanobacteria (commonly Nostoc), and develop small ascomata (fruiting bodies) of the pycnoascocarp or apothecial types; asci are thin-walled and usually eight-spored. The generic diagnosis of Paracyphus follows this overall syndrome and separates the lineage on a combination of those anatomical and ontogenetic (developmental) traits together with its distinct phylogenetic position. The single species, P. gotlandicus, forms very inconspicuous patches consistent with these features.

== Habitat and distribution ==
Paracyphus gotlandicus was described from material collected on the Swedish island of Gotland, which is the only locality reported at the time of its publication. It was found in an alvar area at an elevation of 15 m.
