= Harpidium =

Scientific classification
- Domain: Eukaryota
- Kingdom: Fungi
- Division: Ascomycota
- Family: Harpidiaceae
- Genus: Harpidium; Körb. (1855)

Type species
- Harpidium rutilans Körb. (1855)

Species
- H. gavilaniae H. nashii H. rutilans

Genus of lichens

Harpidium is a genus of lichen-forming fungi in the family Harpidiaceae. The genus contains three species. Harpidium was circumscribed in 1855 by German lichenologist Gustav Wilhelm Körber, with Harpidium rutilans assigned as the type species.

== Species ==
- Harpidium gavilaniae G.Amo, Pérez-Ort. & A.Crespo (2011)
- Harpidium longisporum V.J.Rico (2022)
- Harpidium nashii Scheid. (2000)
- Harpidium rutilans Körb. (1855)

The taxon Harpidium glaucophanum (Nyl.) Hasse (1913) is now known as Rhizoplaca glaucophana.
