= Gyrotrema =

Scientific classification
- Domain: Eukaryota
- Kingdom: Fungi
- Division: Ascomycota
- Class: Lecanoromycetes
- Order: Graphidales
- Family: Graphidaceae
- Genus: Gyrotrema; Frisch (2006)

Type species
- Gyrotrema sinuosum (Sipman) Frisch (2006)

Species
- G. album G. aurantiacum G. flavum G. papillatum G. sinuosum G. wirthii

Genus of lichens

Gyrotrema is a genus of lichen-forming fungi in the family Graphidaceae. There are six species assigned to the genus:

- Gyrotrema album Kalb (2009)
- Gyrotrema aurantiacum Sipman, Lücking & Chaves (2012)
- Gyrotrema flavum M.Cáceres, Aptroot & Lücking (2014)
- Gyrotrema papillatum Lücking (2011)
- Gyrotrema sinuosum (Sipman) Frisch (2006)
- Gyrotrema wirthii Rivas Plata, Lücking & Lumbsch (2008)
