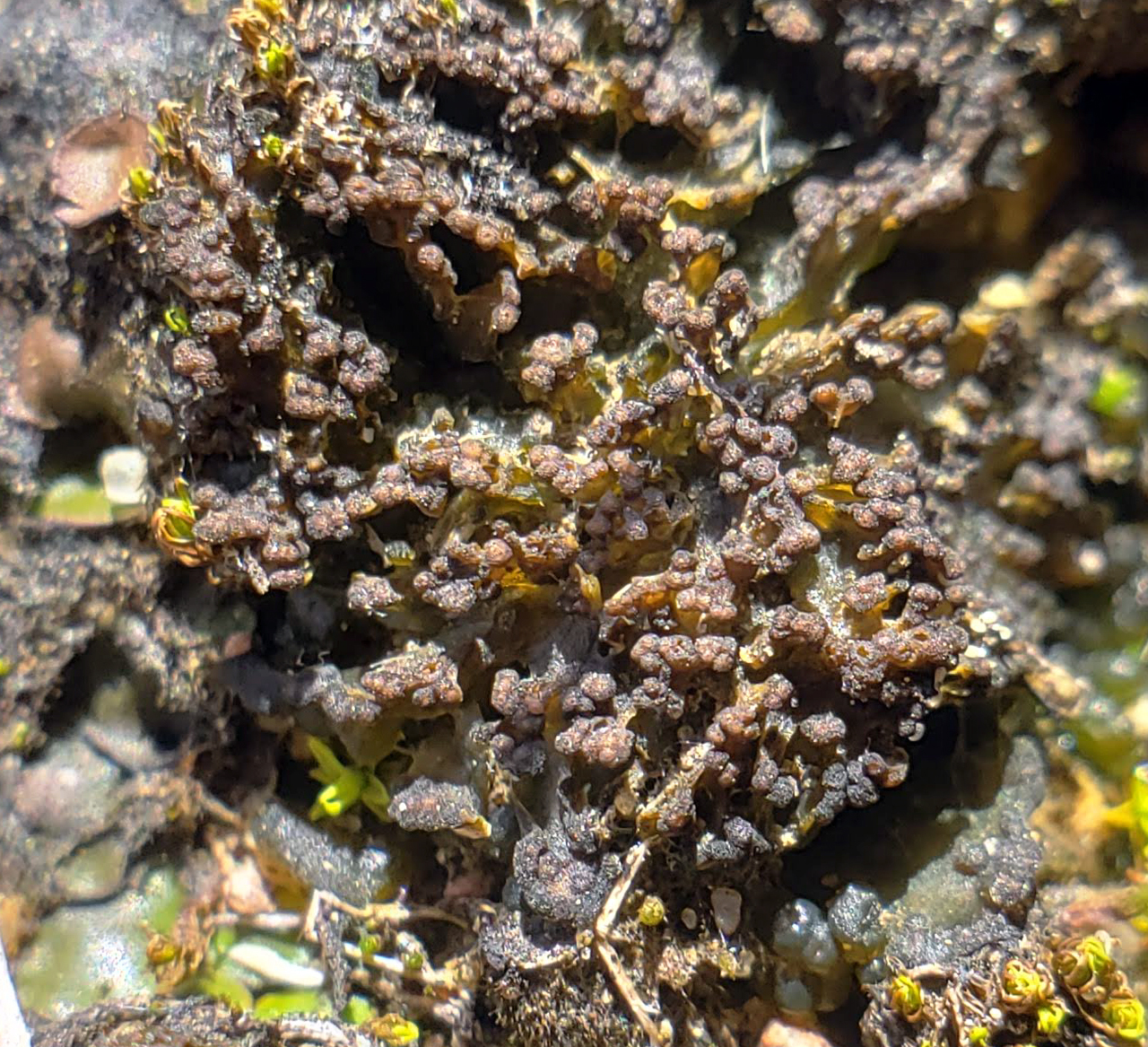
- Lempholemma polyanthes

Scientific classification
- Kingdom: Fungi
- Division: Ascomycota
- Class: Lichinomycetes
- Order: Lichinales
- Family: Porocyphaceae
- Genus: Lempholemma; Körb. (1855)

Type species
- Lempholemma compactum (Wallr.) Körb. (1855)

Synonyms
- Arnoldia A.Massal. (1856); Collema sect. Arnoldia Vain. (1890); Lempholemma sect. Arnoldia (Vain.) Zahlbr. (1924); Physma sect. Plectopsora Zahlbr. (1906); Plectopsora A.Massal. (1860); Schizoma Nyl. ex Cromb. (1894)

= Lempholemma =

Genus of lichen-forming fungi

Lempholemma is a genus of lichen-forming fungi in the family Porocyphaceae. It comprises 14 species of gelatinous lichens that grow on rocks, mortar, bryophytes, or soil. These lichens form thin, often inconspicuous mats that can take various shapes—from wart-like crusts to tiny leaf-shaped scales or delicate tufts—and turn dark blue-green and gelatinous when damp due to their partnership with nitrogen-fixing cyanobacteria. Established as a genus in 1855 by the German lichenologist Gustav Wilhelm Körber to separate certain gelatinous lichens from the genus Collema, Lempholemma species typically colonise alkaline substrates and are distinguished by their simple, non-septate spores and distinctive thallus structure.

== Taxonomy ==
The genus Lempholemma was circumscribed by the German lichenologist Gustav Wilhelm Körber in 1855 as a new genus to accommodate certain gelatinous lichens that had previously been misclassified under Collema. Körber distinguished Lempholemma from Collema based on several key morphological differences, including the distinctive spore characteristics, the broader mucilaginous layer, and the peculiar floccose-fibrous rather than gelatinous consistency of the thallus structure. The genus name is derived from the Greek words λέμφος ('slime, mucus') and τό λέμμα ('rind'), referring to the characteristic appearance of the dried thallus. Körber noted that while these lichens had been known and collected under various names including Collema compactum, C. botrytis, and C. granulosum, their distinct morphology warranted generic separation.

In a multilocus phylogeny and re-classification of the class Lichinomycetes published in 2024, María Prieto, Mats Wedin and Matthias Schultz emended the family Porocyphaceae to include Lempholemma and resurrected Synalissina for the "Lempholemma botryosum group"; several species formerly placed in Lempholemma were transferred out accordingly.

== Description ==
Lempholemma forms a thin, often inconspicuous mat that can take many shapes—wart-like crusts, tiny leaf-shaped scales, delicate tufts, or short filaments. When damp, the thallus turns dark blue-green to olive and feels gelatinous because it lacks the layered cortex found in most lichens; instead, the fungal tissue is a compact mass of brick-like cells. Chains of the cyanobacterium Nostoc thread through this tissue, occasionally swelling into clusters; these cells supply photosynthetic energy and fix atmospheric nitrogen. Some species develop hormocystangia—specialised break-away packets of cyanobacterial filaments—that act as vegetative propagules.

Sexual structures (apothecia) are mainly scattered across the thallus surface. They begin as tiny globes immersed in the thallus and may protrude slightly as they mature. Each fruit body has a conspicuous rim of thallus tissue, while the internal rim (exciple) is so thin—rarely over 20 micrometres—that it can be hard to see without microscopy. The spore layer contains slender, scarcely branched paraphyses embedded in a jelly that gives a reddish to blue staining reaction with iodine. The asci hold eight colourless, single-celled ascospores surrounded by a gelatinous envelope that dissolves in potassium hydroxide solution. Asexual spores are produced in immersed, globe-shaped pycnidia; the rod-shaped conidia may be straight or slightly swollen at the ends. No secondary metabolites have been detected by thin-layer chromatography.

== Ecology ==
Lempholemma typically colonises alkaline substrates—calcareous rock, mortar, basic seepage surfaces, bryophyte cushions, or soil—and, though externally similar to other gelatinous blue-green lichens, can be separated by its Nostoc photobiont and simple, non-septate spores.

== Species ==
As of September 2025, Species Fungorum (in the Catalogue of Life) accepts 14 species of Lempholemma. Several species formerly placed in Lempholemma were reassigned in 2024, including transfers to Synalissina (e.g. L. cladodes, L. degelianum, L. isidiodes, L. vesiculiferum) and to Paludolemma (L. syreniarum).

- Lempholemma boninense H.Harada (2021) – Japan
- Lempholemma botryosum (A.Massal.) Zahlbr. (1924)
- Lempholemma chalazanum (Ach.) B.de Lesd. (1910)
- Lempholemma compactum Körb. (1855)
- Lempholemma corticola M.Schultz & T.Sprib. (2011)
- Lempholemma intricatum (Arnold) Zahlbr. (1924)
- Lempholemma polyanthes (Schrad.) Malme (1924)
- Lempholemma polycarpum M.Schultz (2005)
- Lempholemma radiatum (Sommerf.) Henssen (1968)
- Lempholemma socotranum M.Schultz (2003) – Socotra
- Lempholemma umbella (Nyl.) Zahlbr. (1924)
