= Harpidiaceae =

Scientific classification
- Kingdom: Fungi
- Division: Ascomycota
- Subdivision: Pezizomycotina
- Family: Harpidiaceae; Vězda ex Hafellner (1984)

Genera
- Euopsis; Harpidium

Family of lichens

Harpidiaceae is a small family of lichen-forming fungi, containing two genera and five species. It is of uncertain classification in the Pezizomycotina.

== Taxonomy ==
The Harpidiaceae was first informally proposed by Antonín Vězda in 1974 to contain genus Harpidium, which he noted "is an extremely isolated genus, unrelated to the Lecanoraceae. It should be recognized as a separate monotypic family". It was formally published in 1984 by Josef Hafellner, along with several other families characterised mainly by differences in the amyloid reactions of structures of their asci. In 1988, Aino Henssen and colleagues published the results of a study of the thallus, apothecia, and pycnidia of the genera Harpidium and Euopsis, and concluded that they corresponded to the genus Pyrenopsis and other genera of the Lichinaceae (order Lichinales, class Lichinomycetes). With this, they justified including Harpidium and Euopsis in the Lichinaceae, and amended the circumscription of that family to include species with green-algal phycobionts. They concluded their paper stating: "Minor differences in the amyloid reaction of the ascus apex as viewed with the light microscope are, in our opinion, not a sound basis for the delimitation of families in lichenized ascomycetes as has been suggested by Hafellner (1984)".

The classification of these genera was for some time a matter of contention. In an advanced research workshop on ascomycete systematics conducted in 1993, Hafellner opposed the placement of these genera in the Lichinaceae, stating "The Harpidiaceae clearly have features of a lecanoralean fungus which separate it from Lichinaceae. If this amount of variation in ascus structure is permitted, there is no reason not to include the Lichinaceae in the Lecanorales". Christoph Scheidegger and Matthias Schultz proposed to reinstate the Harpidiaceae in a 2004 publication, based on preliminary DNA sequence data that suggested its phylogenetic distinctiveness. Several later authors still did not accept the family, continuing to include the genera Harpidium and Euopsis in the Lichinaceae.

In a corrected and amended version of the "2016 classification of lichenized fungi in the Ascomycota and Basidiomycota", the Harpidiaceae was added as Pezizomycotina incertae sedis. To support this decision, the authors mentioned two nuSSU sequences for Harpidium and Euopsis, available on Genbank, but, at the time of publication, without a published phylogeny. In their own (unpublished) analysis, the genera were shown to be closely related and "form a clade apparently not nested within Lichinomycetes or any other known class in the Ascomycota". This classification, with a distinct Harpidiaceae, has been maintained in subsequent published revisions of fungal classification in 2020 and 2021.

== Description ==
Harpidiaceae lichens have a crustose thallus form that grows on non-calcareous rocks. It is homoiomerous, meaning that the algae are uniformly distributed throughout the thallus. The apothecia are sunken, and bordered by the thallus, with a barely developed proper exciple (a margin around the apothecia, lacking algae). The asci have an amyloid tholus (a thickened apical region). Ascospores number eight per ascus, and they are colourless, thin walled, and crescent shaped.

== Genera and species ==
- Euopsis Nyl. (1875)

- Euopsis granatina
- Euopsis pulvinata

- Harpidium Körb. (1855)

- Harpidium gavilaniae
- Harpidium nashii
- Harpidium rutilans
