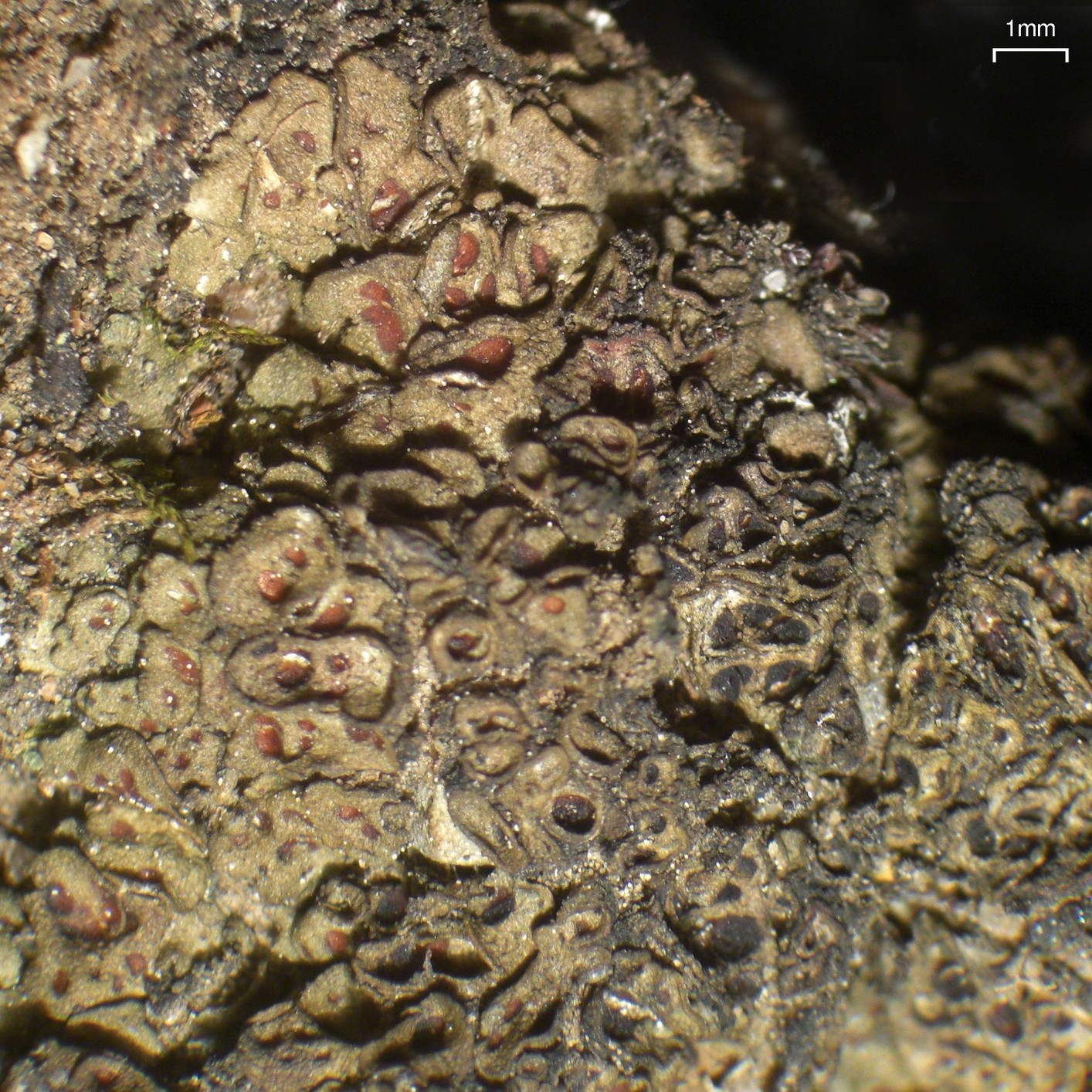
- Heppia lutosa

Scientific classification
- Kingdom: Fungi
- Division: Ascomycota
- Class: Lichinomycetes
- Order: Lichinales
- Family: Porocyphaceae
- Genus: Heppia; Nägeli ex A.Massal. (1854)

Type species
- Heppia adglutinata (Kremp.) A.Massal. (1854)

Synonyms
- List: Heterina Nyl. (1858); Endocarpiscum Nyl. (1864); Guepinia Hepp (1864); Guepinella Bagl. (1870); Nylanderopsis Gyeln. (1935); Pannariella (Vain.) Gyeln. (1935); Heppiomyces Cif. & Tomas. (1953); Placoheppia (Zahlbr.) Oxner (1956)

= Heppia =

Genus of lichens

Heppia is a genus of olive, brownish, grey, or blackish squamulose, crustose, or peltate like lichens. Heppia was once the type genus of the family Heppiaceae, but that family was folded into synonymy with Lichinaceae.

In a multilocus phylogeny and re-classification of the class Lichinomycetes published in 2024, María Prieto, Mats Wedin and Matthias Schultz placed Heppia in the family Porocyphaceae as part of an emended, broader circumscription of that family; earlier treatments that folded Heppiaceae into Lichinaceae are therefore superseded by the new arrangement. Species of Heppia are cyanolichens (usually with filamentous cyanobacteria) that favour open, well-lit habitats on soil or rock, including biological soil crusts in dry regions; they characteristically produce small squamules or peltate to crustose thalli and develop predominantly pycnoascocarpous sexual structures, consistent with the family diagnosis.

The genus was circumscribed by Carl Wilhelm von Nägeli and Abramo Bartolommeo Massalongo in 1854. The genus name Heppiella honours Johann Adam Philipp Hepp (1797–1867), a German physician and lichenologist.

== Description ==
Heppia species grow on rock or soil in arid sites around the world, in habitats similar to those favoured by Peltula, which is similar but has a different cyanobacterium as the photobiont. It lacks a medulla that is separate from the photobiont layer. It is a cyanolichen with the photobiont cyanobacterium being Syctonema (or Syctonema-like). The lower surface is paler than upper surface, and has numerous rhizoidal hyphae attaching it to the substrate. The fruiting structures (ascomata) are apothecias immersed in the thallus with red to red-brown urn shaped (urceolate) to flat or slightly convex discs. An exciple may or may not be present.

== Species ==
- Heppia adglutinata A.Massal. (1854)
- Heppia arenacea M.Schultz (2005)
- Heppia conchiloba Zahlbr. (1902)
- Heppia despreauxii (Mont.) Tuck. (1872)
- Heppia lutosa (Ach.) Nyl. (1869)
