= Stromatella bermudana =

Scientific classification
- Kingdom: Fungi
- Division: Ascomycota
- Class: Lichinomycetes
- Order: Lichinales
- Family: Porocyphaceae
- Genus: Stromatella; Henssen (1989)
- Species: S. bermudana

Binomial name
- Stromatella bermudana (Riddle) Henssen (1989)

Synonyms
- Psorotichia bermudana Riddle (1916)

Species of lichen

Stromatella bermudana is a saxicolous (rock-dwelling) crustose lichen. It is the only species in Stromatella, a monotypic fungal genus in the family Porocyphaceae.

== Taxonomy ==
The genus was circumscribed in 1989 by German lichenologist Aino Henssen. This species was originally described as Psorotichia bermudana by US botanist Lincoln Ware Riddle in 1916, from specimens collected in Bermuda. The genus name alludes to the stromatic structure found in the early developmental stages of its reproductive bodies, whereas the species epithet refers to the type locality, which is the only place the lichen has been found.

A multilocus re-classification of the Lichinomycetes published in 2024 concluded that Stromatella is better placed in Porocyphaceae, rather than in the Lichinaceae, in which it was previously classified.

== Description ==
Stromatella has a crustose thallus, meaning it forms a thin, crust-like growth that spreads across the surface it inhabits. The thallus is indeterminate, meaning it can grow without a defined shape, and is made up of small, scale-like patches (areolate-squamulose). The fungal filaments (hyphae) within the thallus form a complex network. The photosynthetic partner, or cyanobiont, in this lichen is a single-celled cyanobacterium.

The reproductive structures of Stromatella are lecanorine apothecia, which are disc-shaped with a margin that resembles the surrounding thallus. Early in development, these reproductive bodies (primordia) are stromatic, meaning they form from a mass of tissue, and contain many coiled, spore-producing structures (ascogonia) at their centre, along with clusters of algal cells near the surface.

The sacs that produce spores (asci) are prototunicate, meaning they have simple walls with a gelatinous layer. Each ascus contains eight spores. The spores are colourless and have a simple structure, lacking internal divisions (septa).

The paraphyses—sterile filaments that support spore development—are branched and interconnected (anastomosing). Some of these filaments have bead-like (moniliform) tips that originate from the outer layer of the reproductive structure.
