= Harpidium gavilaniae =

Scientific classification
- Kingdom: Fungi
- Division: Ascomycota
- Family: Harpidiaceae
- Genus: Harpidium
- Species: H. gavilaniae

Binomial name
- Harpidium gavilaniae G.Amo, Pérez-Ort. & A.Crespo (2011)
- Holotype site: Namaqualand, South Africa

Species of lichen

Harpidium gavilaniae is a little-known species of saxicolous (rock-dwelling), crustose lichen in the family Harpidiaceae. It is found in the Northern Cape Province in South Africa.

== Taxonomy ==
The lichen was formally described as new to science in 2011 by Guillermo Amo de Paz, Sergio Pérez-Ortega, and Ana Crespo. The type collection was collected 57 km (35 mi) east of Springbok in Namaqualand (Northern Cape province) at an elevation of 1,036 m (3,400 ft). There it was found growing on quartzite in vertical furrows that are seasonally inundated with water. The species epithet honours the Spanish botanist Rosario Gavilán, who accompanied the authors during their fieldwork in South Africa.

== Description ==
The lichen species Harpidium gavilaniae has a crustose, effigurate thallus that can be rounded or ellipsoid and spans up to 2.5 cm in diameter. The areoles, which are the small, distinct patches of the thallus, are independent and vary in shape from flat to bullate (blister-like) or nearly stalk-like. These areoles are typically adhered to the substrate over most of their lower surface, with the peripheral zone often free and with a maroon-purple to copper-red colour. The peripheral areoles extend outwards, forming lobes that are about 0.4–0.9 mm wide, sometimes reaching up to 1.3 mm. In contrast, the central areoles are more rounded and typically bear immersed apothecia, measuring 0.3–0.6 mm in diameter.

Structurally, the areoles are layered, with heights ranging from 0.2 to 0.7 mm. The tissue of the upper cortex is paraplectenchymatous (made of hyphae are oriented in all directions) and is approximately 25 μm high. Below this, the photobiont layer, consisting of Trebouxia-like chlorococcoid (spherical green algae) cells measuring 6–15 μm in diameter, is continuous and spans 90–200 μm in height.

The apothecia of Harpidium gavilaniae are irregularly rounded, typically one per areole, and immersed in the thallus, resembling those found in Aspicilia species. The apothecial discs are blackish, with diameters ranging from 0.1 to 0.4 mm. Surrounding the discs, the thalline exciple is up to 20 μm thick. The epihymenium is reddish, does not react to potassium hydroxide (K−), and is about 10 μm thick. The hymenium stands 50–70 μm tall and turns blue when exposed to iodine (KI+). The paraphyses are moniliform (resembling a string of beads), measuring 4–6 μm wide and slightly wider at the apex.

The asci are unitunicate-rostrate and clavate in shape, each containing eight spores and measuring 24–27 by 11–14 μm. The ascus walls are thick. ascospores are hyaline and simple, with a crescent form where the two apices are rotated at a 90-degree angle, measuring 9–13 by 6–7 μm with thick walls (approximately 0.8 μm).

Pycnidia are frequently present, laminal, and immersed, measuring 70–120 μm in diameter. The conidia are cylindrical to ellipsoidal, sized at 3 by 1 μm. No secondary metabolites were detected in Harpidium gavilaniae through thin-layer chromatography analysis.
