= Soil crust =

Soil surface layers that are distinct from the rest of the bulk soil

Soil crusts are soil surface layers that are distinct from the rest of the bulk soil, often hardened with a platy surface. Depending on the manner of formation, soil crusts can be biological or physical. Biological soil crusts are formed by communities of microorganisms that live on the soil surface whereas physical crusts are formed by physical impact such as that of raindrops.

== Biological soil crusts ==
Biological soil crusts are communities of living organisms on the soil surface in arid- and semi-arid ecosystems. They are found throughout the world with varying species composition and cover depending on topography, soil characteristics, climate, plant community, microhabitats, and disturbance regimes. Biological soil crusts perform important ecological roles including carbon fixation, nitrogen fixation, soil stabilization, alter soil albedo and water relations, and affect germination and nutrient levels in vascular plants. They can be damaged by fire, recreational activity, grazing, and other disturbance and can require long time periods to recover composition and function. Biological soil crusts are also known as cryptogamic, microbiotic, microphytic, or cryptobiotic soils.

== Physical soil crusts ==
Physical (as opposed to biological) soil crusts results from raindrop or trampling impacts. They are often hardened relative to uncrusted soil due to the accumulation of salts and silica. These can coexist with biological soil crusts, but have different ecological impact due to their difference in formation and composition. Physical soil crusts often reduce water infiltration, can inhibit plant establishment, and when disrupted can be eroded rapidly.
