= Heppia conchiloba =

Conservation status
- Apparently Secure (NatureServe)

Scientific classification
- Kingdom: Fungi
- Division: Ascomycota
- Class: Lichinomycetes
- Order: Lichinales
- Family: Lichinaceae
- Genus: Heppia
- Species: H. conchiloba

Binomial name
- Heppia conchiloba Zahlbr. (1902)

Species of lichen

Heppia conchiloba (common soil ruby) is a gray to light brown squamulous to foliose terricolous (grows on soil) lichen that occurs in southwestern deserts of North America. The surface appears as if covered in a light dust (pruinose). The squamules are peltate (like shields attached from the lower surface), up to 8 mm in diameter. There are one to several apothecia per lobe, with reddish-brown urn-shaped (urceolate) to concave discs, immersed so as to appear like concave spots. Lichen spot tests are all negative. Its entire thallus body is deeply convex, and it is different in color from other members of Heppia and or Peltula, which are olive or brownish-olive.
