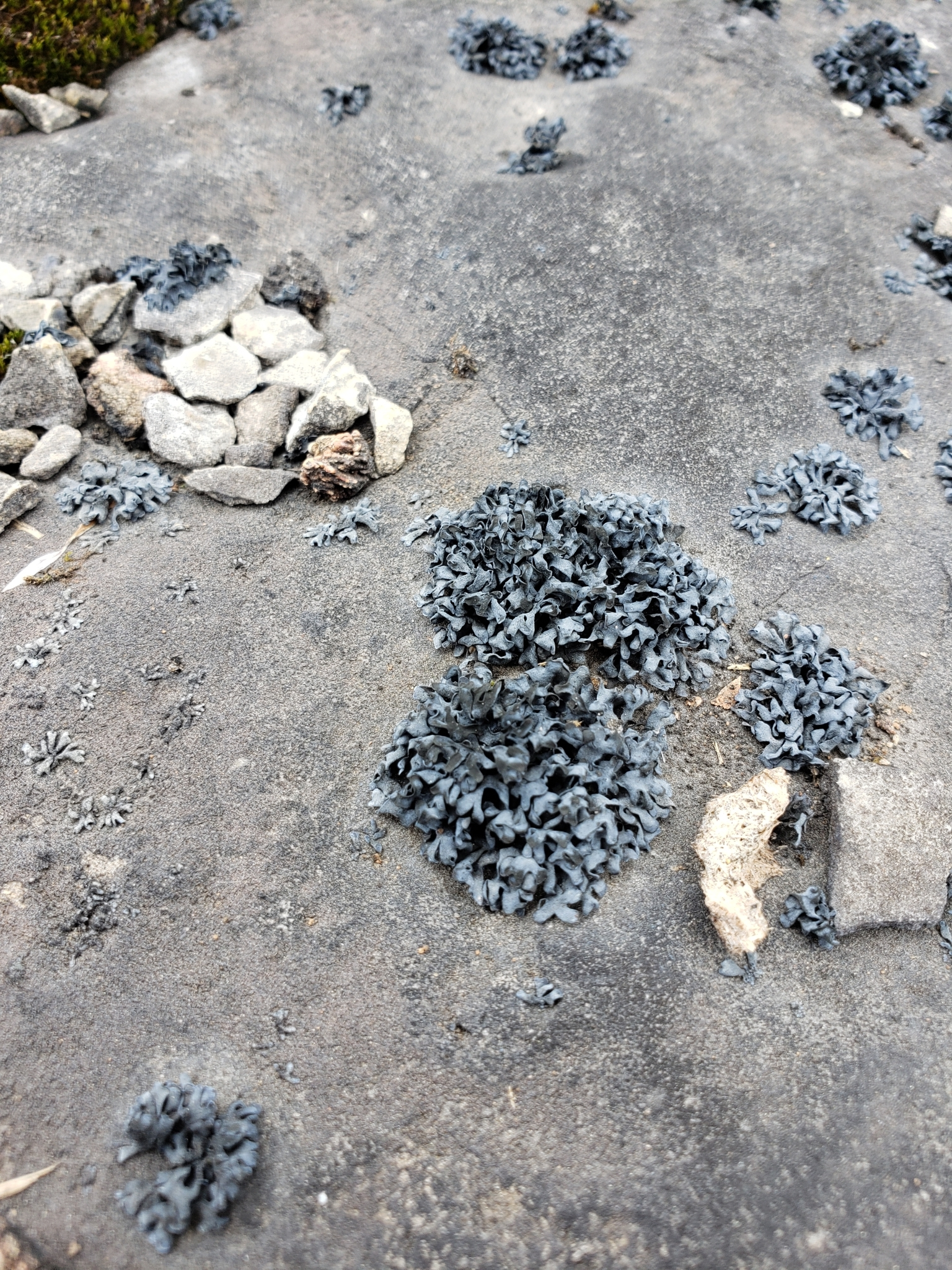
- Thyrea confusa

Scientific classification
- Kingdom: Fungi
- Division: Ascomycota
- Class: Lichinomycetes
- Order: Lichinales
- Family: Porocyphaceae
- Genus: Thyrea; A.Massal. (1856)

Type species
- Thyrea plectospora A.Massal. (1856)

Species
- T. confusa T. girardii T. plectopsora T. porphyrella

Synonyms
- Lecidea sect. Omphalaria Ach. (1803); Omphalaria Durieu & Mont. (1847); Omphalaria sect. Omphalaria Durieu & Mont. (1847); Omphalaria subgen. Omphalaria Durieu & Mont. (1847)

= Thyrea (lichen) =

Genus of fungi

Thyrea is a genus of lichen-forming fungi in the family Porocyphaceae. It contains four species that have been accepted by Species Fungorum.

The genus was circumscribed by Italian lichenologist Abramo Bartolommeo Massalongo in 1856, with Thyrea plectospora assigned as the type species. In a multilocus phylogeny and molecular phylogenetics-informed reclassification of the Lichinomycetes published in 2024, María Prieto, Mats Wedin and Matthias Schultz placed Thyrea in the emended family Porocyphaceae.

== Species ==
- Thyrea confusa Henssen (1990)
- Thyrea girardii (Durieu & Mont.) Bagl. & Carestia (1881)
- Thyrea plectopsora A.Massal. (1856)
- Thyrea porphyrella M.Schultz, Büdel & Porembski (2001) – South America
