= Watsoniomyces =

Scientific classification
- Kingdom: Fungi
- Division: Ascomycota
- Class: Lichinomycetes
- Order: Lichinales
- Family: Porocyphaceae
- Genus: Watsoniomyces; D.Hawksw., M.Powell & T.Sprib. (2021)
- Species: W. obsoletus

Binomial name
- Watsoniomyces obsoletus (Nyl.) D.Hawksw., M.Powell & T.Sprib. (2021)

Synonyms
- Biatorina obsoleta (Nyl.) Arnold (1871); Lecidea obsoleta Nyl. (1865)

Species of lichen

Watsoniomyces is a single-species fungal genus in the family Porocyphaceae. It contains the saxicolous (rock-dwelling) crustose lichen Watsoniomyces obsoletus.

== Taxonomy ==
The genus was circumscribed in 2021 by David Hawksworth, Mark Powell, and Toby Spribille to contain the species formerly known as Lecidea lichenicola. Molecular phylogenetic analysis showed that the species belonged to the family Lichinaceae in the order Lichinomycetes. The original material of Lecidea lichenicola was examined and determined to actually be a different species, Trapelia glebulosa. Further research showed that the earliest available name for this lichen is Lecidea obsoleta (originally described by William Nylander in 1865), and so a modern collection was used to neotypify the species. Watsoniomyces obsoletus grows on chalk pebbles, and is the first known member of the Lichinomycetes that has an endolithic thallus.

In a multilocus reclassification of the class Lichinomycetes published in 2024, María Prieto, Mats Wedin and Matthias Schultz placed Watsoniomyces in the emended family Porocyphaceae.

== Description ==
Genus Watsoniomyces stands out from all other known genera in the order Lichinomycetes because it has a thallus (the main body of the lichen) that grows inside rock surfaces (endolithic), unlike others that typically have a crusty (crustose) or slightly scaly (subsquamulose) surface or even a shrub-like (fruticose) growth.

The prodominant photobiont partner is a cyanobacterium belonging to Scytonema, but it has also been found partnered with algae that have orange-pigmented chloroplasts (perhaps Trentepohlia), and also with clusters of green algal cells similar to Chlorella.

== Habitat and distribution ==
Watsoniomyces obsoletus typically grows on chalk pebbles found in disturbed environments, such as near rabbit burrows or in areas where the ground has been scraped, revealing chalk fragments on the surface. This species particularly favours smaller pebbles, no larger than 10 cm. It forms part of a unique community of various verrucarioid species and has been classified in the Lecideetum watsoniae group, based on studies conducted in Hertfordshire, Norfolk, Surrey, and Sussex.

This lichen is confirmed to exist only in southern and eastern England, with sightings in Bedfordshire, Buckinghamshire, Cambridgeshire, Hertfordshire, the Isle of Wight, Norfolk, Surrey, Sussex, and Yorkshire. Over the past 50 years, it has disappeared from several locations in southern England, likely due to a decrease in rabbit grazing which allowed for more scrub growth. Despite being categorised as "least concern" and "nationally scarce" in British lichen conservation evaluations, Watsoniomyces obsoletus is considered significant for conservation as it is potentially endemic to the UK. It is suspected that this species might also be found on the French side of the English Channel, although it has not yet been reported from France or any other region.
