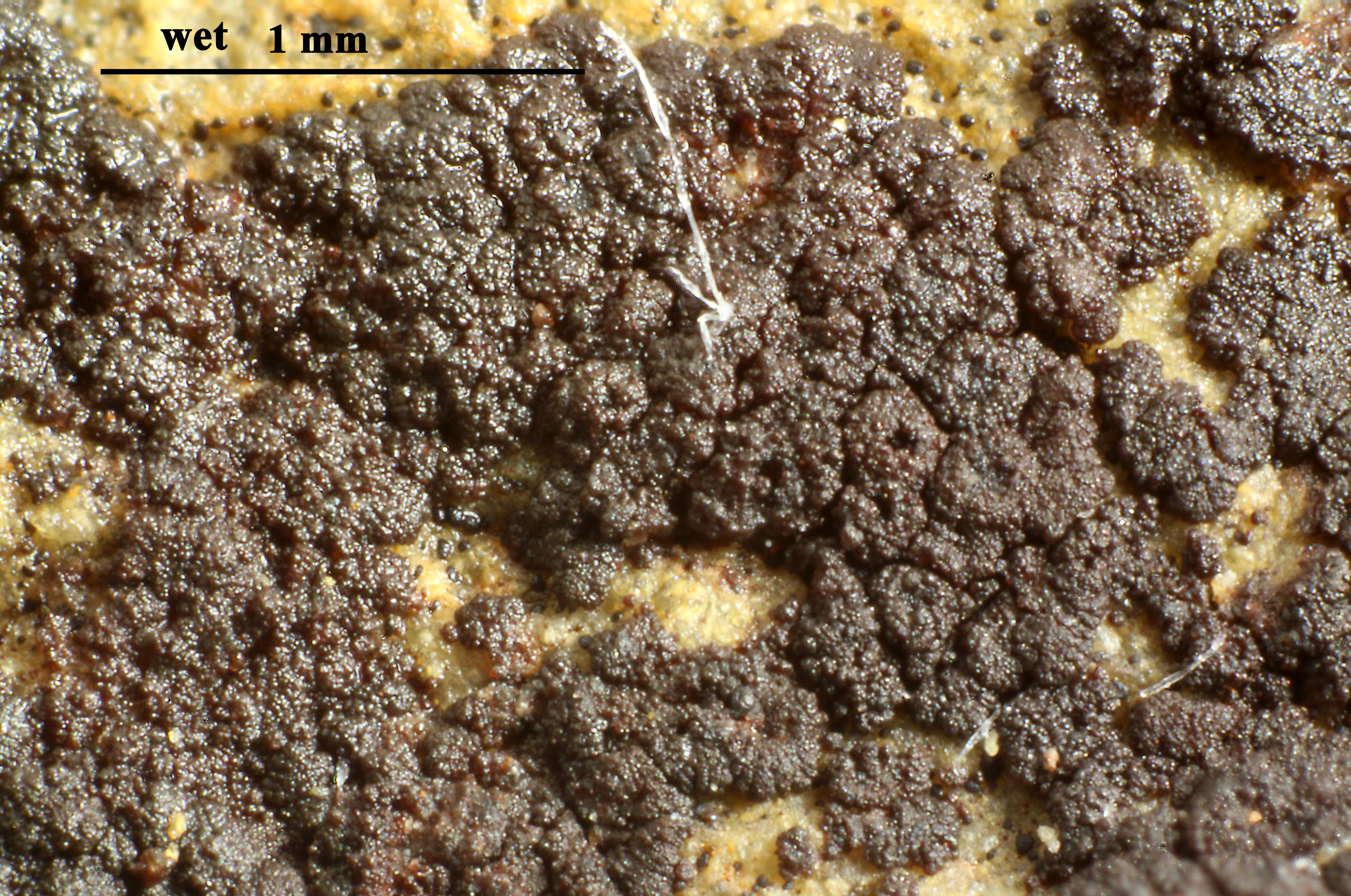
- Cladopsis triptococca

Scientific classification
- Kingdom: Fungi
- Division: Ascomycota
- Class: Lichinomycetes
- Order: Lichinales
- Family: Porocyphaceae
- Genus: Cladopsis; Nyl. (1885)

Type species
- Cladopsis triptococca (Nyl.) Nyl. (1886)

Species
- C. densisidiata C. foederata C. guyanensis C. palmana C. polycocca C. triptococca

= Cladopsis =

Genus of lichens

Cladopsis is a genus of lichen-forming fungi in the family Porocyphaceae. The genus contains small, dark lichens that form tiny crusts or scales on rocks and partner with cyanobacteria. Originally proposed in 1881 and later merged into another genus, Cladopsis was re-established as a distinct genus in 2024 based on genetic and structural studies. The six known species are found mainly in tropical regions, where they grow on acidic or volcanic rocks in damp conditions.

== Taxonomy ==
William Nylander first proposed Cladopsis as a subgenus of Pyrenopsis in 1881 for P. triptococca; a few years later, Auguste-Marie Hue treated it at generic rank as Cladopsis. Nylander then published the combination C. triptococca in 1886, but later authors mostly sank Cladopsis back into Pyrenopsis. To stabilise usage, Aino Henssen (1989) lectotypified Pyrenopsis triptococca as the type of subgenus Cladopsis (i.e. of Cladopsis sensu Hue). A comprehensive phylogeny and morphological reassessment in 2024 then re-established Cladopsis as a distinct genus within Porocyphaceae, recovering a cohesive clade ("triptococca and allies") and making several new combinations. Older uses of "Cladopsis melambola" are not followed; that taxon is now treated as Metamelanea melambola.

== Description ==
The thalli of Cladopsis species are minute crusts to tiny scales, often with a granular or short, coral-like texture. The patches (areoles) may be lobed (effigurate) and can form isidia, which are small outgrowths used for vegetative spread. The thallus lacks a true cortex and is homoiomerous (the photobiont is mixed throughout), presenting as a dark reddish-brown to black crust set on a jelly-like base.

The photobiont is gloeocapsoid cyanobacteria with layered, reddish sheaths that are penetrated by slender, finger-like haustoria. Apothecia are very small and can resemble tiny perithecia: narrow, slightly cupped discs that are semi-immersed to sessile, usually with a persistent thalline margin and little or no proper exciple. The hymenium gives a strong iodine staining reaction (turns deep blue with KOH/Lugol). Asci are slender, thin-walled and eight-spored; they lack an amyloid apical dome but carry a conspicuous gelatinous outer cap; this is the ascus type referred to as the Peccania (Pyrenopsis) type in the 2024 treatment. Ascomata develop beneath a functioning pycnidium (pycnoascocarpic development). Pycnidia are more or less spherical (subglobose) to broadly pear-shaped and produce small, ellipsoid to short rod-shaped conidia. No secondary metabolites have been detected by thin-layer chromatography.

== Habitat and distribution ==
Mostly recorded from the tropics, with a few reaching warm-temperate latitudes and none known from cold climates. Species typically colonise acidic or volcanic, mineral-rich silica-rich rocks, especially on sloping faces kept damp by seepage. Some occur in shadier, persistently wet microhabitats. Reported sites range from sun-exposed rock that is only periodically wetted to marginal, amphibious situations.

== Species ==
- Cladopsis densisidiata (Aptroot, Oliveira-Junior & M.Cáceres) M.Schultz & M.Prieto (2024)
- Cladopsis foederata (Nyl.) M.Schultz & M.Prieto (2024)
- Cladopsis guyanensis (M.Schultz, Porembski & Büdel) M.Schultz & M.Prieto (2024)
- Cladopsis palmana (J.Steiner) M.Schultz & M.Prieto (2024)
- Cladopsis polycocca (Nyl.) M.Schultz & M.Prieto (2024)
- Cladopsis triptococca (Nyl.) Nyl. (1886)
