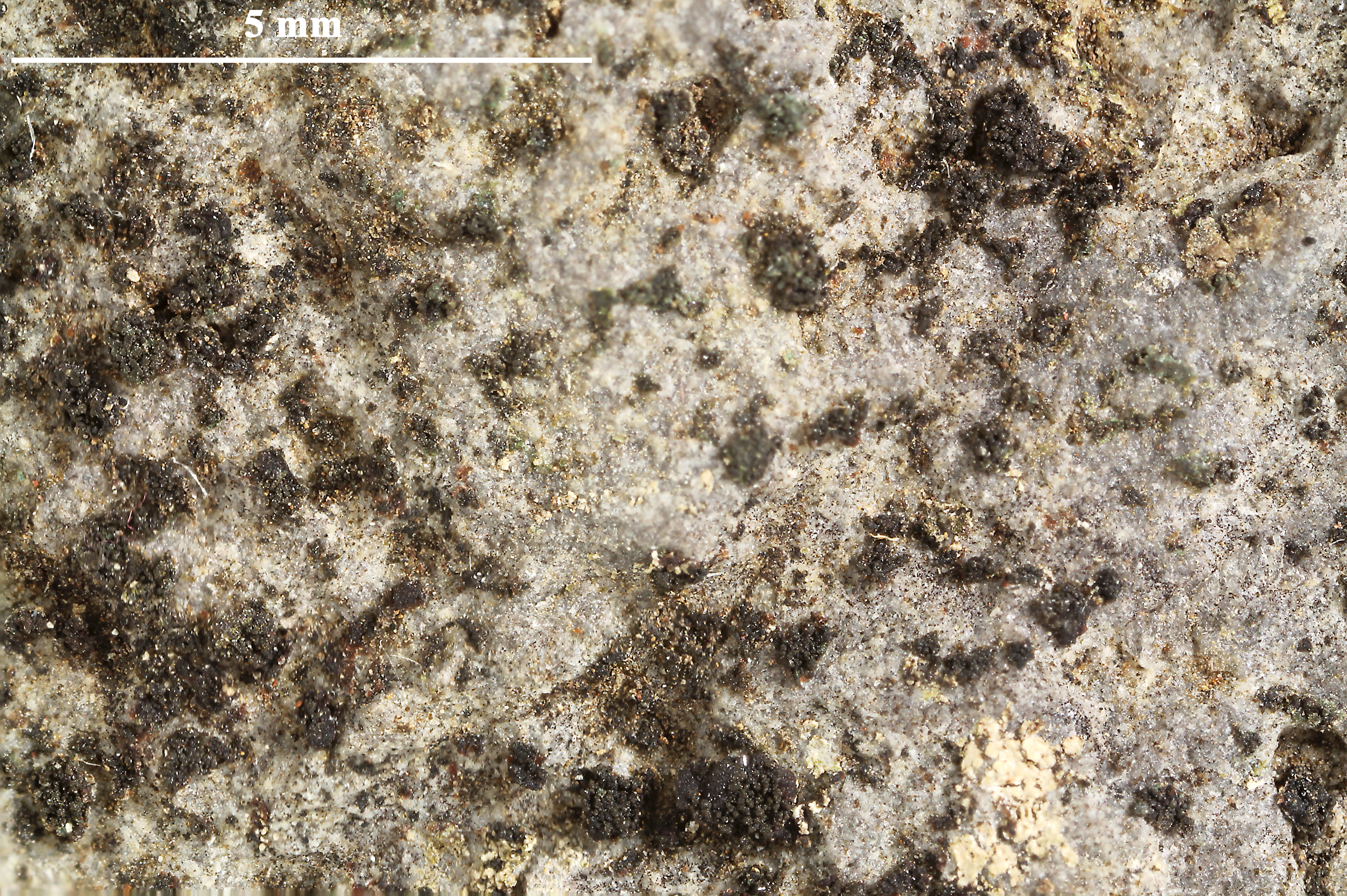
- Porocyphus coccodes

Scientific classification
- Kingdom: Fungi
- Division: Ascomycota
- Class: Lichinomycetes
- Order: Lichinales
- Family: Porocyphaceae; Körb. (1855)

Type genus
- Porocyphus Körb. (1855)

Genera
- see text

Synonyms
- Heppiaceae Zahlbr. (1906); Ephebaceae Th.Fr. (1861); Pyrenopsidaceae Zahlbr. (1861)

= Porocyphaceae =

Family of lichens

The Porocyphaceae are a family of lichen-forming fungi in the order Lichinales. Members of this family are typically small, dark-coloured lichens that form partnerships with cyanobacteria and grow on rocks, soil, or occasionally tree bark in well-lit areas that experience periodic wetting. The family was originally established in 1855 but was largely ignored until a 2024 study greatly expanded its scope to include genera previously placed in several other families. Porocyphaceae species are found worldwide, though they are uncommon in densely shaded forests.

== Taxonomy ==
The name Porocyphaceae was originally established by Gustav Wilhelm Körber in 1855 for Porocyphus. Later authors did not adopt the family, and Porocyphus was usually classified in the family Ephebaceae. A 2024 multilocus phylogeny and character study by Prieto, Wedin, and Schultz reinstated and emended Porocyphaceae to cover a much larger clade, treating Heppiaceae, Ephebaceae and Pyrenopsidaceae as synonyms under Porocyphaceae. The same work set out the included genera and indicated that a few placements—such as Calotrichopsis, Gyrocollema, Pseudoheppia and Stromatella—are provisional pending further molecular data. The Lichina willeyi species group was transferred into Porocyphus.

== Description ==
Species of Porocyphaceae are usually small, dark (often blackish) cyanolichens. Thalli are commonly homoiomerous (with photobiont and mycobiont intermingled) and mostly ecorticate; growth forms range from crustose to squamulose, foliose, dwarf-fruticose, filamentous and, rarely, endolithic. Photobionts include single-celled cyanobacteria with yellow-brown or reddish-purple gelatinous sheaths as well as filamentous forms such as Nostoc, Scytonema, Stigonema and members of the Rivulariaceae.

Ascomata are predominantly pycnoascocarps, i.e., the sexual structures develop from ascogones formed beneath pycnidia. Apothecia, when present, may be zeorine, lecanorine or biatorine in form; a proper exciple is often developed. Asci are mainly prototunicate of the Lichina or Peccania types and are typically eight‑spored, though polyspory occurs; some taxa possess unitunicate-rostrate asci. Paraphyses are always present; ascospores are simple and usually broadly ellipsoid. Conidiomata are pycnidia with simple conidiophores that produce small, simple conidia.

In practice the family differs from Lichinaceae by its mostly pycnoascocarpous ascomata, from Phylliscaceae by lacking unitunicate‑rostrate asci and corticate, dorsiventrally stratified thalli, and from Lichinellaceae by lacking thallinocarps and Lichinella-type asci.

== Habitat and distribution ==
Porocyphaceae is cosmopolitan but is scarce in dense, shaded forests without exposed rock or soil. Species occur on a wide variety of rocks (often seasonally or episodically wetted and in well-lit microhabitats), in amphibious or periodically inundated situations, and in biological soil crusts; a few are rarely corticolous. No secondary metabolites have been detected in Porocyphaceae species by thin-layer chromatography.

== Genera ==
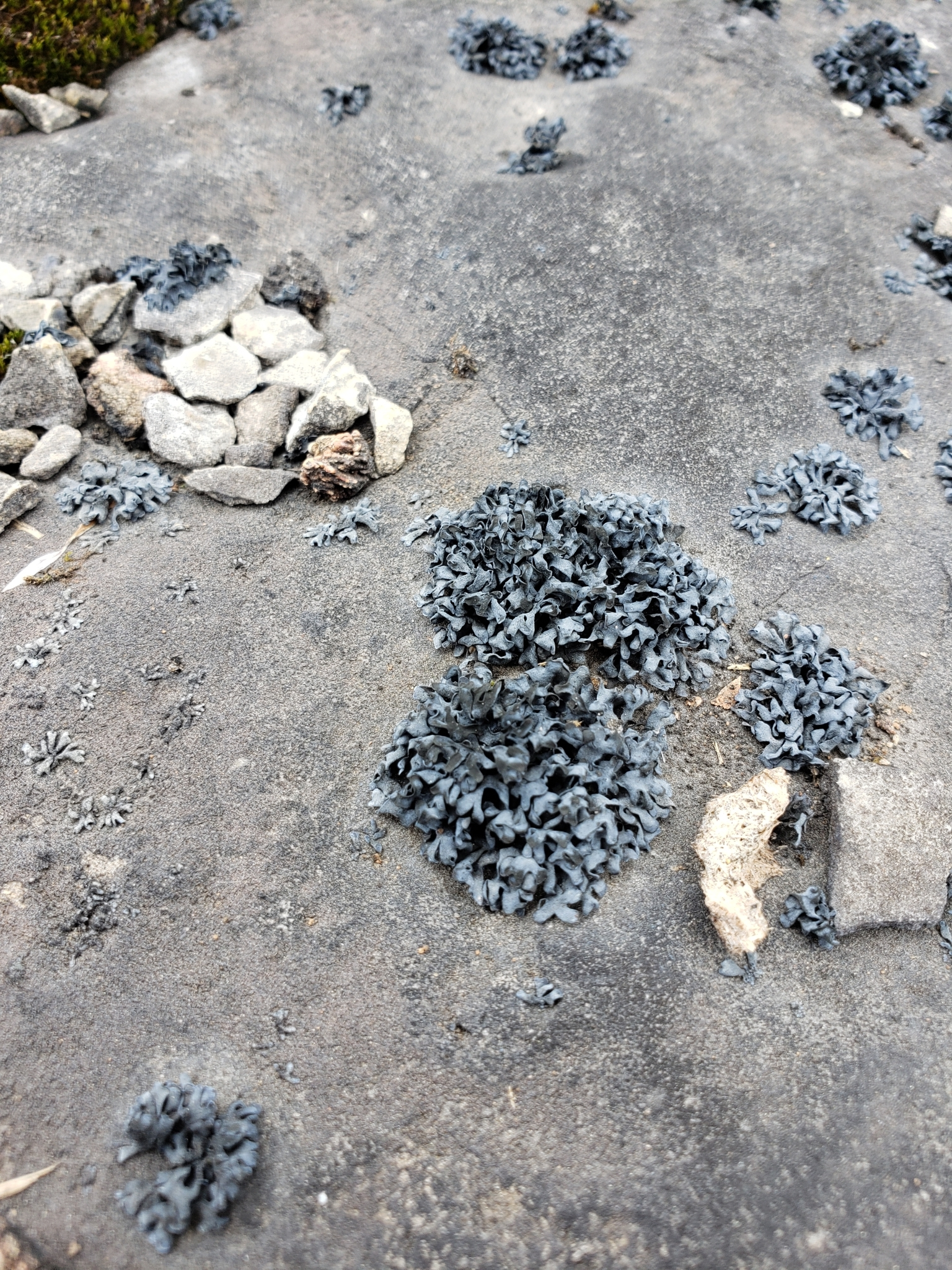
Thyrea confusa

- Calotrichopsis Vain. (1890)
- Cladopsis Nyl. (1885)
- Ephebe Fr. (1825)
- Gyrocollema Vain. (1929)
- Heppia Nägeli ex A.Massal. (1854)
- Lapismalleus M.Schultz & M.Prieto (2024)
- Lecidopyrenopsis Vain. (1907)
- Lempholemma Körb. (1855)
- Paracyphus M.Schultz & M.Prieto (2024)
- Pleopyrenis Clem. (1909)
- Porocyphus Körb. (1855)
- Pseudocarpon M.Schultz & M.Prieto (2024)
- Pseudoheppia Zahlbr. (1903)
- Pyrenopsis (Nyl.) Nyl. (1858)
- Stromatella Henssen (1989)
- Thermutis Fr. (1825)
- Thyrea A.Massal. (1856)
- Tichocyphus M.Schultz & M.Prieto (2024)
- Watsoniomyces D.Hawksw., Mark Powell & T.Sprib. (2021)
