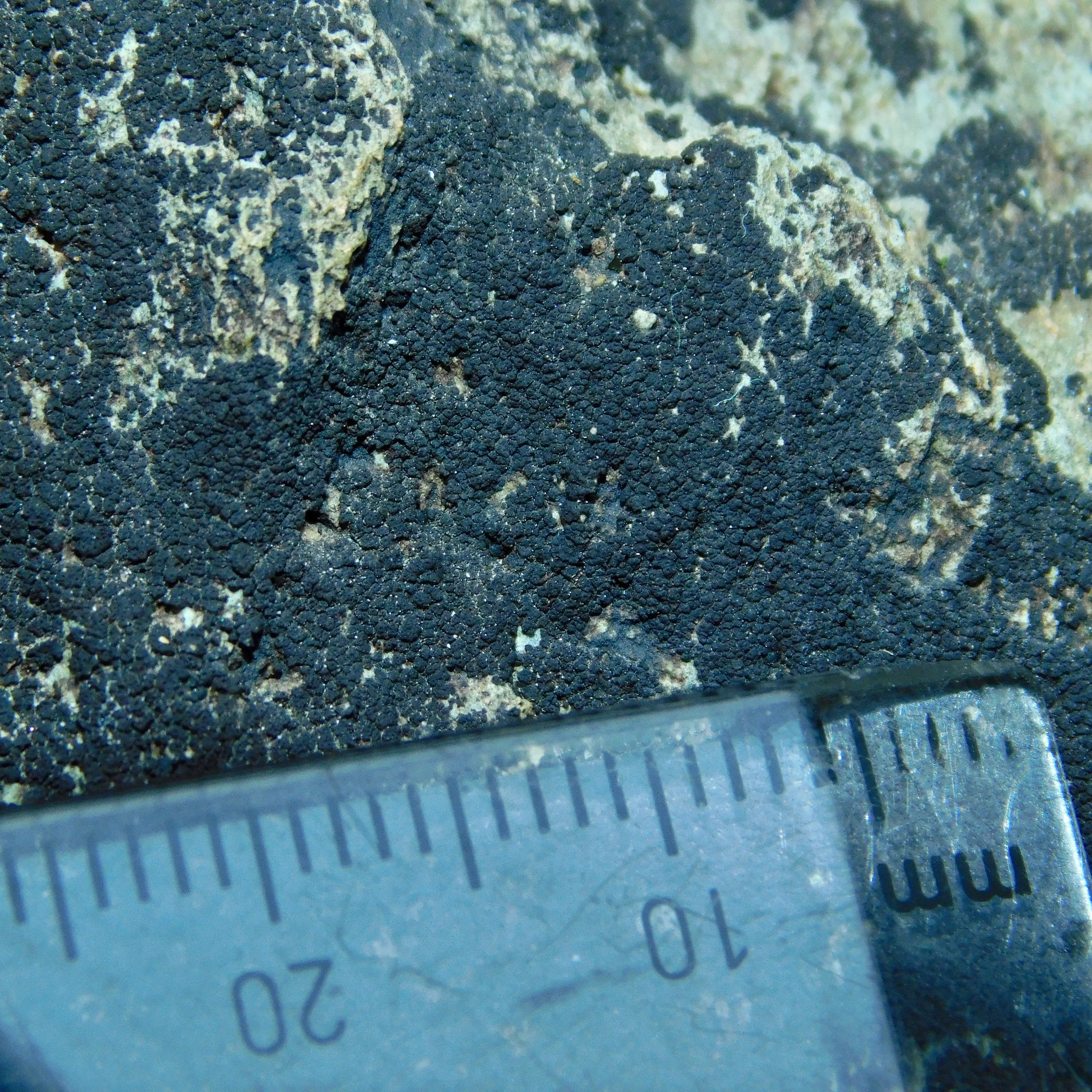
- Pyrenopsis polycocca

Scientific classification
- Kingdom: Fungi
- Division: Ascomycota
- Class: Lichinomycetes
- Order: Lichinales
- Family: Porocyphaceae
- Genus: Pyrenopsis; Nyl. (1858)

Type species
- Pyrenopsis fuscatula Nyl. (1858)

= Pyrenopsis =

Genus of lichens

Pyrenopsis is a genus of lichen-forming fungi in the family Porocyphaceae. The lichens grow on constantly wet, shaded rock faces where they form gelatinous crusts that soften and show reddish tints when moistened. They reproduce through small, buried fruiting bodies that open as pore-like structures at the surface.

== Taxonomy ==
The genus was circumscribed by the Finnish lichenologist William Nylander in 1858. Nylander described the genus as having a fragile, granular-areolate thallus with loosely coherent cellular structure and simple spores. He noted that Pyrenopsis bears some resemblance to the genus Synalissa, suggesting it might be considered a subdivision of that genus, but distinguished it based on its specific combination of thallus structure and spore characteristics. He included three species: P. fuscatula (the type species), P. fuliginea, and P. tasmanica.

A 2024 multilocus re-classification of the Lichinomycetes re-circumscribed Porocyphaceae, placed Pyrenopsis in that family, and segregated part of Pyrenopsis (in the loose sense) into Allopyrenis and Cladopsis, publishing numerous new combinations.

== Description ==
Pyrenopsis forms a thin, dark crust that spreads irregularly across damp rock surfaces. Viewed close up it appears as tiny grains, cracked islands (areoles), or minute leaf-like flakes that merge into a continuous film. When rain or spray wets the thallus it softens and shows a reddish tint because the lichen lacks a true outer skin (cortex): the entire body is built from uniformly sized fungal cells that swell with absorbed water. Its photosynthetic partner (photobiont) is a cyanobacterium resembling Gloeocapsa. Near the surface each algal cell – or small cluster of cells – sits in a jelly-like envelope that turns reddish brown and gives a purple reaction in potassium hydroxide solution, lending the upper thallus a faint brown blush.

Reproduction takes place in small, perithecium-like apothecia that are mostly buried in the thallus except for a pore-like opening. A thick rim of thallus tissue (the thalline margin) surrounds the pore and remains visible even when the fruit body matures into a shallow cup; the disc itself ranges from orange-brown to blackish. The internal fungal wall (exciple) is extremely thin – usually under 15 μm – and may be hard to see, while the spore layer is colourless or faintly brown and turns blue-green or reddish brown when stained with iodine. Supporting filaments (paraphyses) may remain simple or branch into bead-like chains toward their tips. Two ascus types occur in the genus: in species such as P. furfurea the ascus tip shows a blue amyloid dome under iodine, whereas in P. subareolata the tip is thin and non-amyloid. Each ascus produces eight or more colourless, single-celled ascospores that are ellipsoid to nearly spherical and lack an outer gelatinous coat. Asexual spores are generated in immersed pycnidia and are short rods or tiny ellipsoids. No secondary metabolites have been detected by thin-layer chromatography.

== Ecology ==
Pyrenopsis most often colonises perpetually moist, shaded rock faces and, more rarely, damp soil, its gelatinous, reddish-tinged crust and pore-like apothecia distinguishing it from similar cyanobacterial lichens.

== Species ==
As of June 2025, Species Fungorum (in the Catalogue of Life) accept 12 species of Pyrenopsis.

- Pyrenopsis australiensis Müll.Arg. (1893)
- Pyrenopsis cavernicola S.Y.Kondr., Lőkös & Hur (2018)
- Pyrenopsis chejudoensis Lőkös, S.Y.Kondr. & Hur (2016)
- Pyrenopsis furfurea (Nyl.) Th.Fr. (1866)
- Pyrenopsis haematina P.M.Jørg. & Henssen (1990)
- Pyrenopsis micrococca (Bornet & Nyl.) Forssell (1885)
- Pyrenopsis phylliscella Nyl. (1875)
- Pyrenopsis picina (Nyl.) Forssell (1885)
- Pyrenopsis subareolata (Nyl. ex Malbr.) Cromb. (1894)
- Pyrenopsis tasmanica Nyl. (1858)
