= Cyanolichen =

Category of lichens

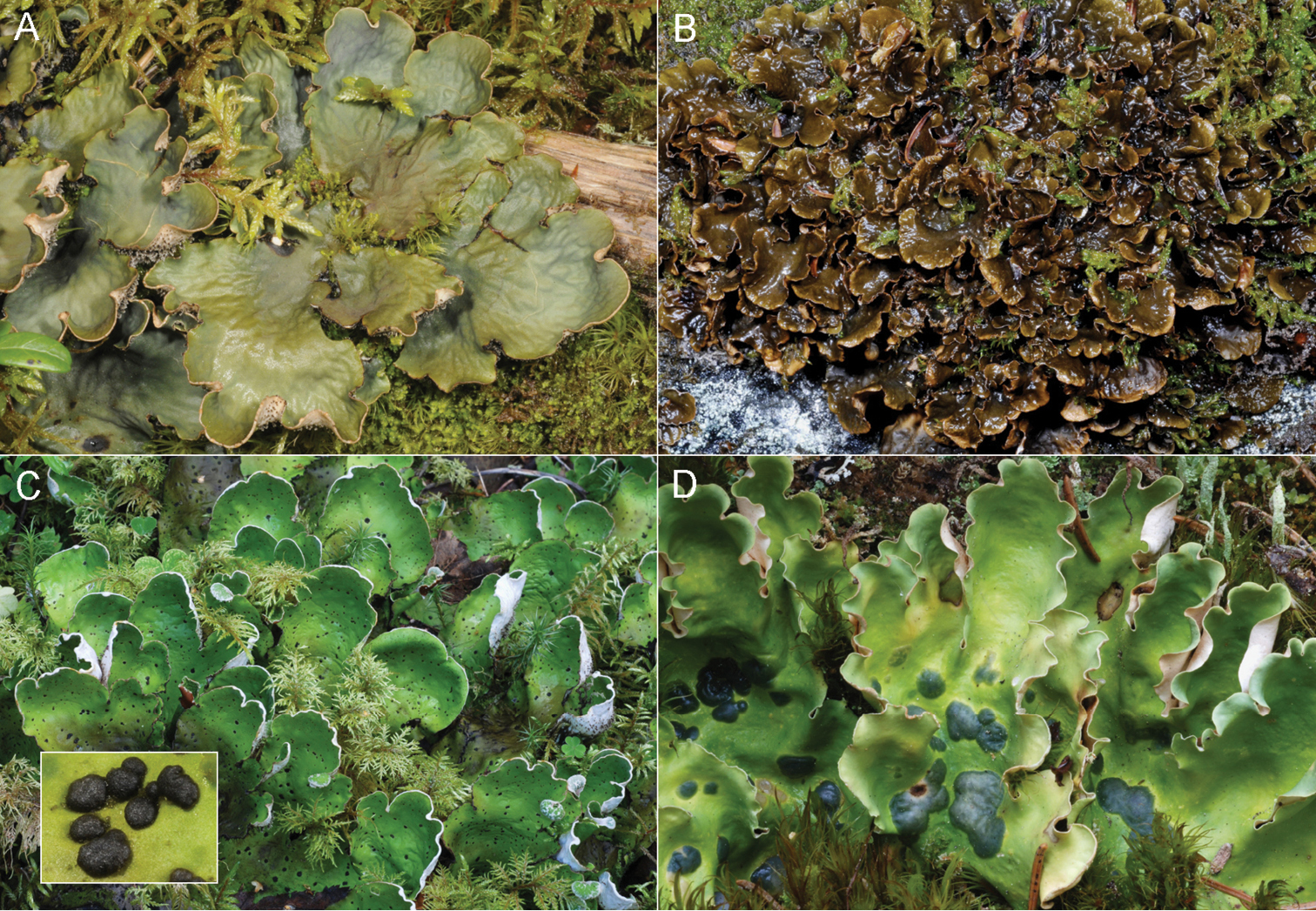
Bipartite and tripartite cyanolichens. A In the bipartite cyanolichen Peltigera scabrosa the cyanobacterial symbiont (Nostoc) forms a continuous layer just below the upper cortex of the lichen thallus. B Nephroma bellum is another example of bipartite cyanolichens. C In the tripartite cyanolichen Peltigera aphthosa the Nostoc symbiont is restricted to wart-like cephalodia (shown magnified) on the upper surface of the thallus, while the green algal symbiont (Coccomyxa) forms the photobiont layer. D Nephroma arcticum is another example of tripartite cyanolichens. The large cephalodia of this species are internal, but clearly visible through the upper cortex of the hydrated thallus.

Cyanolichens are lichens that apart from the basic fungal component ("mycobiont"), contain cyanobacteria, otherwise known as blue-green algae, as the photosynthesizing component ("photobiont"). Overall, about a third of lichen photobionts are cyanobacteria and the other two thirds are green algae.

Some lichens contain both green algae and cyanobacteria apart from the fungal component, in which case they are called "tripartite". Normally the photobiont occupies an extensive layer covering much of the thallus, but in tripartite lichens, the cyanobacterium component may be enclosed in pustule-like outgrowths of the main thallus called cephalodia, which can take many forms. Apart from gaining energy through photosynthesis, the cyanobacteria which live in cephalodia may perform nitrogen fixation on behalf of the lichen community. These cyanobacteria are generally more rich in nitrogen-fixing cells called heterocysts than those which live in the main photobiont layer of lichens.
