= Gloeoheppia polyspora =

Scientific classification
- Kingdom: Fungi
- Division: Ascomycota
- Class: Lichinomycetes
- Order: Lichinales
- Family: Lichinaceae
- Genus: Gloeoheppia
- Species: G. polyspora

Binomial name
- Gloeoheppia polyspora Henssen (1995)

Species of lichen-forming fungus

Gloeoheppia polyspora is a species of lichen-forming fungus in the family Lichinaceae. It forms dark olive, cushion-like patches of small scales on rock in arid shrubland. The species is distinguished from related lichens by its asci, which typically contain 16 ascospores rather than the usual 8. It occurs in Mexico, the southwestern United States, and Argentina.

== Taxonomy ==
Gloeoheppia polyspora is a lichen-forming fungus that Aino Henssen described as a new species in 1995. In her diagnosis, Henssen distinguished it from the similar Gloeoheppia turgida mainly by its mostly 16-spored asci (spore-producing sacs). In a regional key for the southwestern United States, it is treated as a crustose, rock-dwelling species with polysporous asci and a hymenium that is usually not divided.

The type collection is from Mexico (Oaxaca, near Zapotitlán, along the highway from Huajuapan de León to Tehuacán), gathered from limestone outcrops in xerophytic scrub in September 1982. The species epithet polyspora refers to the "many-spored" asci typical of this lichen.

== Description ==
The thallus (lichen body) is made of densely packed squamules that can become peltate, forming dark olive, cushiony (pulvinate) patches with a smooth surface that may be slightly pruinose. Individual squamules reach about 3 mm across and 1.5 mm thick, and the peltate parts tend to have an incised margin; attachment is by a short rhizoidal strand up to about 1 mm long. In cross-section, the thallus is about 90–240 μm thick.

The apothecia (fruiting bodies) are adnate and up to about 0.5 mm wide, with a brown, urn-shaped (urceolate) apothecia with a brown disk and a thalline margin up to 140 μm thick. The hymenium is non-amyloid (it does not turn blue in iodine) and 120–160 μm tall, while the subhymenium is 10–35 μm tall and stains blue in iodine (I+ blue). The exciple is weakly developed (about 10–25 μm thick), and the paraphyses have slightly thickened tips. Asci are cylindrical (about 70–90 × 6–9.5 μm) and usually 16-spored, though asci with 8 or fewer spores also occur. The ascospores are about 6–8.5(–12) × 4.5–6 μm (reported as immature in the asci). Pycnidia were observed; they are about 130–145 μm broad and 155–215 μm tall, producing conidia about 1.5–2 × 1 μm.

== Habitat and distribution ==
Gloeoheppia polyspora was originally reported from Mexico on calcareous rock in xerophytic scrub, but it has also been recorded from the southwestern United States; Schultz reported it from Maricopa County, Arizona on a slightly sloped, relatively shaded granite rock surface near Canyon Lake along the Apache Trail. It has also been recorded from Argentina, and in Mendoza, is a member of the biocrust lichen community there. At the time of its description, Henssen noted that G. polyspora was the only New World species of Gloeoheppia, then known only from Mexico, whereas the other species were reported from Mediterranean, Macaronesian, and Saharo-Arabian regions.

A further specimen from Baja California Sur (on volcanic rock) was mentioned with some hesitation because only eight-spored asci were seen in the limited material; the few mostly sterile squamules were found growing together with Pseudopeltula heppioides.
