= Rabdophaga dubiosa =

Scientific classification
- Kingdom: Animalia
- Phylum: Arthropoda
- Clade: Pancrustacea
- Class: Insecta
- Order: Diptera
- Family: Cecidomyiidae
- Genus: Rabdophaga
- Species: R. dubiosa

Binomial name
- Rabdophaga dubiosa (Kieffer, 1913)

Synonyms
- Dasineura dubiosa Rabdophaga dubia Kieffer; Rhabdophaga dubiosa (Kieffer, 1913)

Species of fly

Rabdophaga dubiosa is a gall midge which forms galls on the young shoots of willow (Salix species).

== Description ==
The gall is a pear-shaped swelling about 15 to 20 millimetres (0.59 to 0.79 in) long on a young shoot. The swelling is broader than that of the gall of R. karschi and contains individual larva in separate chambers that run together. The similar looking gall of R. pierreana only has one large chamber containing red larvae, while the larvae of dubiosa are yellow or light orange. Pupation takes place in the gall and the pupa does not have a tooth near the base of the antenna. In Britain, the gall has been recorded on eared willow (S. aurita) and creeping willow (S. repens). Elsewhere the gall has been found on S. alba, S. caprea, S. cinerea, S. foetida, S. helvetica and S. purpurea.

== Distribution ==
Found in the Czech Republic, Finland, Great Britain and Romania
