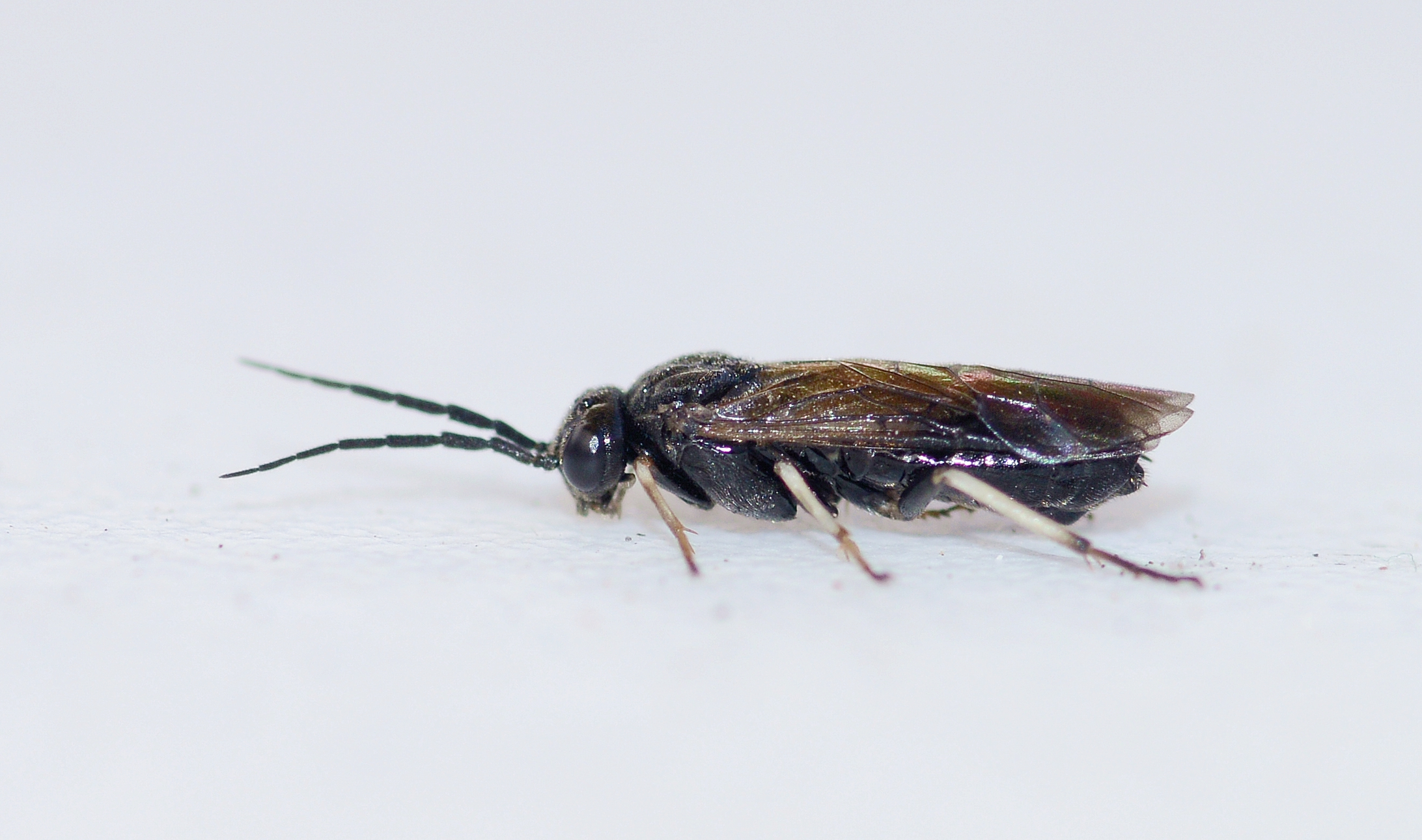
- Euura proxima

Scientific classification
- Kingdom: Animalia
- Phylum: Arthropoda
- Clade: Pancrustacea
- Class: Insecta
- Order: Hymenoptera
- Suborder: Symphyta
- Family: Tenthredinidae
- Genus: Euura
- Species: E. proxima

Binomial name
- Euura proxima (Serville, 1823)

Synonyms
- Pontania proxima Lepeletier, 1823; Nematus proximus Serville, 1823

= Euura proxima =

Species of sawfly

Euura proxima is a species of sawfly belonging to the family Tenthredinidae (common sawflies). The larvae feed on the leaves of willows (Salix species), creating galls. It was described by Jean Guillaume Audinet-Serville in 1823. The species was placed in the genus Euura in 2014 and was previously known as Nematus proximus and Pontania proxima.

== Description ==
The larvae have a darkened head, typically seen as they increase in maturity. Once they emerge from the gall, they form a cocoon. This cocoon takes on soil particles and leafy matter, having a fibrous texture. Overall, it is described as being cylindrical in shape with a golden brown color, the thickness depending on the developmental stage of the specimen.

The body of adult E. proxima is mostly black with a brown hue, the legs being a lighter, reddish-brown tone. A distinctive feature of this species is its thread like antenna which have shorter antennomeres compared to other similar species. This species is a part of Hymenoptera, which can be identified through multiple facets. For example, Hymenoptera have four membranous wings, mandibulate mouthparts and a true ovipositor. Mandibulate mouthparts are identified by multiple pairs of appendages coming from two unsegmented mandibles.

== Description of the gall ==
The gall is an ovoid, bean-shaped gall, up to 12 mm x 6 mm in size, with a hard thick red wall when occupied. The gall is formed when the female lays her eggs and injects a substance into the leaf. At first the galls are green and the walls soften as the larva consumes the tissue. Some galls may not be occupied, possibly because an egg was not laid or it did not hatch. There can be several galls to a leaf and they do not usually touch the midrib. Galls of E. proxima are found on white willow (S. alba), weeping willow (S. babylonica), S. x blanda, S. excelsa, crack willow (S. fragilis) and bay willow (S. pentandra). There are two broods in a year with the first brood maturing around mid-summer and the second in the autumn.

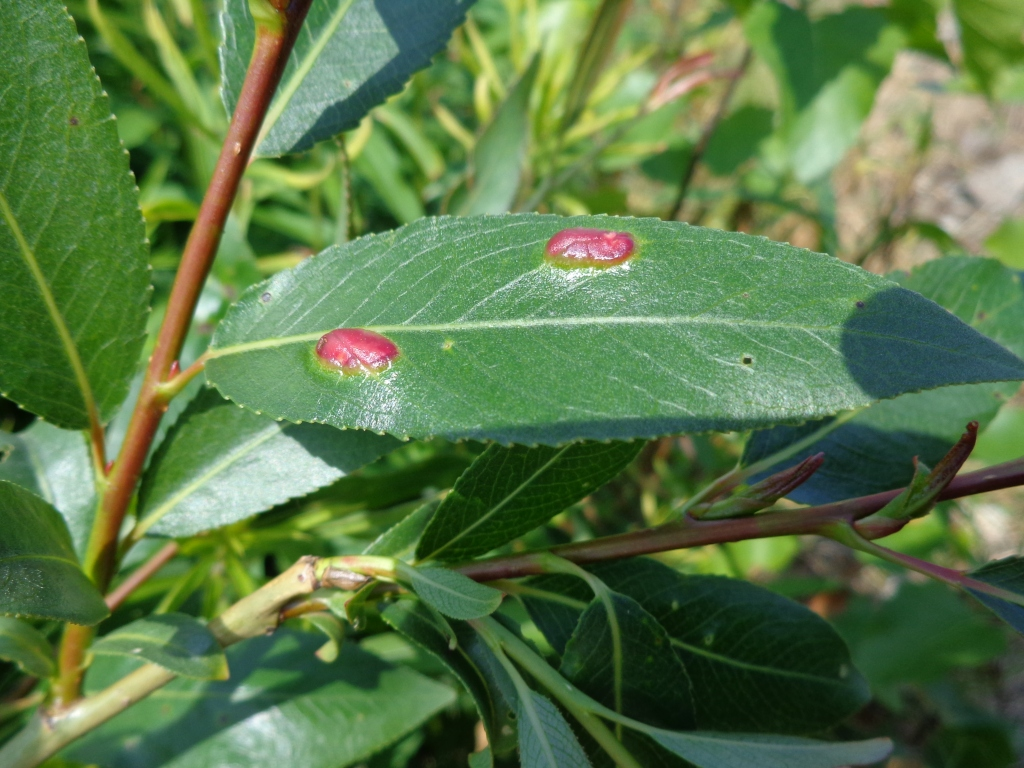
Galls of Euura proxima on Salix leaves in Latvia.

E. proxima is one of three closely related species in the Euura proxima group. The other members of the group are,

- E. bridgmanii (Cameron, 1883)
- E. triandrae (Benson, 1941)

== Species Interactions ==
=== Inquilines ===
The following species are inquilines of E. proxima,

- Archarius salicivorus (Paykull, 1792) — the Archarius are weevils of the family Curculionidae. The female weevil lays an egg in the galls of Euura species, which eventually kills the original larva (but is not eaten). The weevil larva can be distinguished from the Euura larva by the lack of feet and lies in the shape of a horse-shoe. Pupation takes place in the ground and the autumn generation hibernates as an adult.
- A. crux (Fabricius, 1776) — There are two generations a year and the female weevil lays an egg in the galls of Euura species, and possibly this species. The larva will eat the original egg or the larva of the galling species. Pupation is in the ground and the autumn generation weevil hibernates through the winter.
- Euphranta toxoneura (Loew, 1846) — the Euphranta are fruit flies of the family Tephritidae. The larva of E. toxoneura feed in this gall and that of Euura bridgmanii, first killing the host larva, which is evicted. The inquiline larva when fully grown leaves the gall and pupates in the soil.

=== Parasitoids ===
The following species are parasitoids of E. proxima,

- Pnigalio nemati (Westwood, 1838) and P. dolichurus (Thomas, 1878) — These parasitic wasps larvae develop from eating the sawfly larvae externally and are often found within its cocoon.
- Diaparsis stramineipes (Brischke, 1880) — This species targets the pupal stage rather than the larval. The parasitic wasp's egg is laid on the sawfly in the prepupa stage, where it then consumes the pupa from within the cocoon.
- Pnigalio soemius (Walker, 1839) — This species is a known parasitoid of multiple gall-forming sawflies and has been found in the gall of E. proxima.

== Distribution ==
Originally, this species was native to the Western Palearctic area; however, it has been distributed by accident around the globe. This species is now found throughout Europe, north to southern Finland and east to the Caucasus. It has been introduced to Australia, North America and New Zealand. The widespread range is due to the spread of its host plants such as Salix alba x fragilis.

In New Zealand, the species has been observed in both main islands, covering a wide range of habitat. The only place with small numbers are the lower West Coast in the South Island, and the lower East Coast in the North Island.

== Habitat Preference ==
The habitat preference of the species is determined by the distribution of the species host plants, as Willow Sawflies are recorded as either monophagous or oligophagous. Majority of Willow sawflies live on the Salicaceae family, with E. proxima being no exception. These host plants are found in abundance along riverbeds, particularly in valleys. Therefore, there is an indication that alluvial environments are a part of the species preferred habitat. They can also be found on willows in other aquatic environments such as lakes and ponds.

== Life Cycle and Phenology ==
Adults tend to come out in spring, during which they begin to search for a suitable willow specimen. It is suggested that they emerge in spring because spring is when their host plants begin a period of development, particularly in leaf growth. The species is most likely parthenogenic in places like New Zealand, with no male sightings seen in the country as of 2021. This is typical of the species group, explaining a pattern of uniform form in E. proxima. Most species in the group also go through multiple generations on an annual basis.

In the Tenthredinidae family, the female continues the life cycle by inserting their ovipositor into the leaf structure. The egg is then implanted into the plant tissue itself, since the plant is a state of rapid growth. How galls form is not fully understood; however, there is evidence of chemical induction as well as the involvement of phytohormones. Phytohormones are plant hormones that can help regulate processes like plant growth. Sawfly galls form as soon as the egg is inserted into the leaf tissue. The eggs hatch after approximately 12–19 days, with the gall reaching its maximum size after two weeks. The larvae initially live in a small opening in the gall; however, it eats through the material until the walls grow thin.

Sawflies typically leave the gall in autumn. After gall departure, E. proxima forms a cocoon in the ground, in which they pupate. The cocoon can also form in willow bark. The family, Tenthredinidae, is known to then overwinter in the cocoon until spring emergence. E. proxima hibernates in a summer-autumn brood; however, it also has a summer brood which reduces the development time to adulthood.

== Diet ==
E. proxima prefers the S. alba and S. fragilis species, as well as the hybrid between them known as S. rubens. Many other species of the Salicaceae family have recorded gall formation, including S. babylonica. The larvae of the species feed on the plant matter provided to them whilst they are enclosed in the gall.
