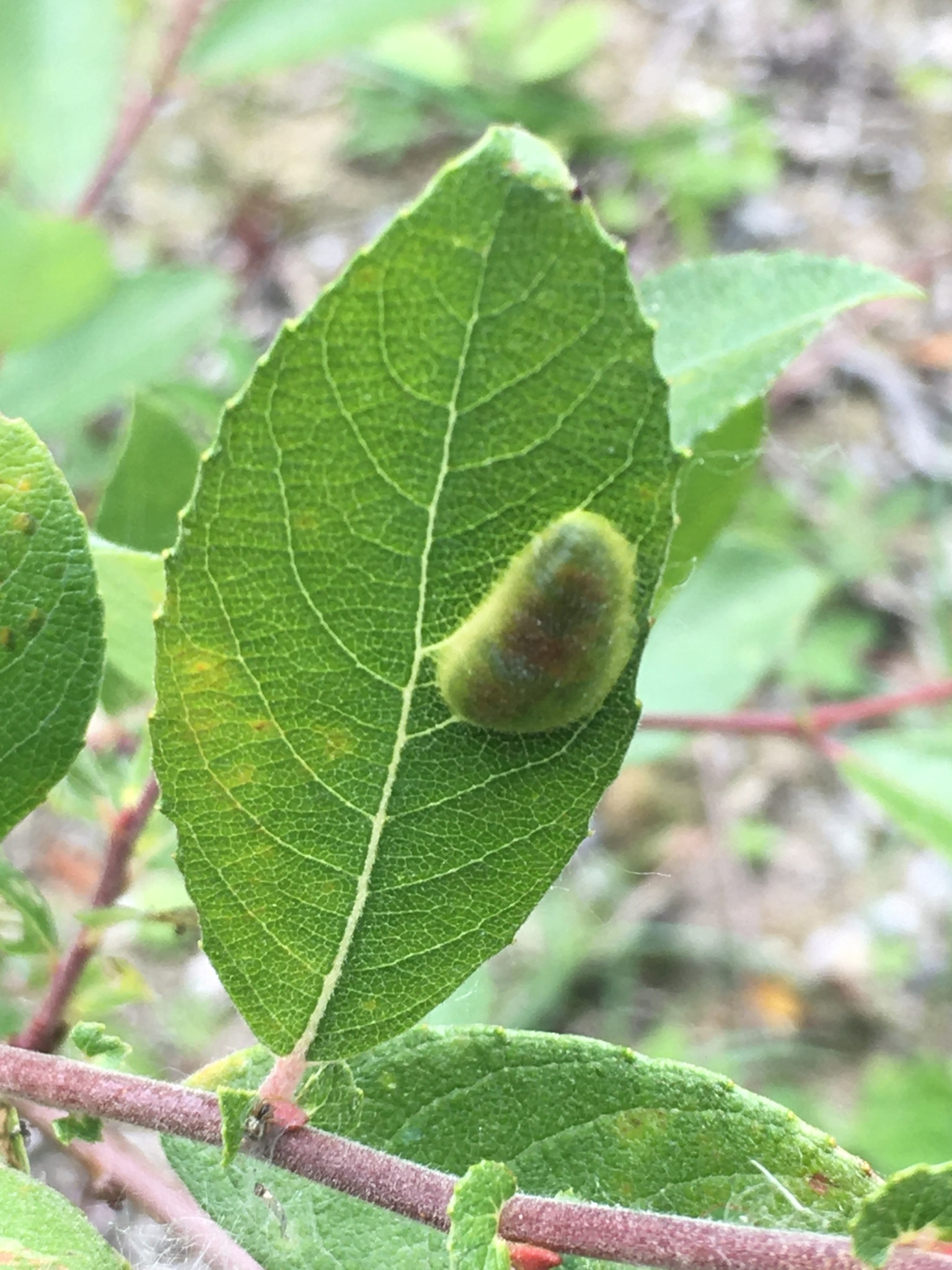

Scientific classification
- Kingdom: Animalia
- Phylum: Arthropoda
- Clade: Pancrustacea
- Class: Insecta
- Order: Hymenoptera
- Suborder: Symphyta
- Family: Tenthredinidae
- Genus: Euura
- Species: E. bridgmanii

Binomial name
- Euura bridgmanii (Cameron, 1883)

Synonyms
- Pontania bridgmani Pontania obscura Kopelke 2005; Euura abdita Kopelke 2014

= Euura bridgmanii =

Species of sawfly

Euura bridgmanii is a species of sawfly belonging to the family Tenthredinidae (common sawflies). The larvae feed on the leaves of sallows (Salix species). It was first described by the entomologist Peter Cameron in 1883.

== Description of the gall ==
The gall is formed when the female lays her eggs and injects a substance into the leaf. Up to 8 mm x 6 mm in size, the ovoid gall is similar to E. proxima but often develops near to or on the midrib. At first the galls are green, and as the larva grows, soften and turn red. It often has a thin red rim on the upper surface.

Galls of E. bridgmani are found on eared willow (S. aurita), goat willow (S. caprea), grey willow (S. cinerea), S.appendiculata, S. foetidal, halberd willow (S. hastata), tea-leaved willow (S. phylicifolia), S. silesiaca, S. starkeana and S. waldsteiniana.

Euura bridgmani is one of three closely related species in the Euura proxima group. The others members of the group are,

- E. proxima (Serville, 1823)
- E. triandrae (Benson, 1941)

== Distribution ==
This species is found in western, central and northern Europe including France, Great Britain, the Netherlands, Norway and Sweden.

== Inquilines ==
Euphranta toxoneura (Loew, 1846) is an inquiline of E. bridgmani and E. proxima. The host larva is killed by the fly and the inquiline feeds on the interior of the gall. When fully grown the inquiline larva leaves the gall, pupating in the soil.
