= Pseudopeltula myriocarpa =

Scientific classification
- Kingdom: Fungi
- Division: Ascomycota
- Class: Lichinomycetes
- Order: Lichinales
- Family: Lichinaceae
- Genus: Pseudopeltula
- Species: P. myriocarpa

Binomial name
- Pseudopeltula myriocarpa Henssen (1995)

Species of lichen-forming fungus

Pseudopeltula myriocarpa is a species of rock-dwelling squamulose lichen in the family Lichinaceae. It forms small, olive-colored, shield-shaped scales on limestone and dolomite. The species is the type of its genus and is distinguished by its fruiting bodies, which become aggregated into dark, spot-like stromatic patches up to about 2 mm across. It occurs in Mexico and the Caribbean.

== Taxonomy ==
Pseudopeltula myriocarpa was described as a new species in 1995 by the lichenologist Aino Henssen. In that paper, Henssen designated P. myriocarpa as the type species of Pseudopeltula, a genus of small, olive cyanolichens with an ecorticate thallus (lacking a true cortex) and unusually complex, mature apothecia.

The species epithet myriocarpa refers to the many small apothecia that ultimately become packed together in a partly stromatic tissue. In Henssen's key to Gloeoheppiaceae, P. myriocarpa is identified by its fruiting bodies being aggregated into stromata that appear as circular to rosette-shaped spots up to about 2 mm across. Henssen also emphasized that, unlike Pseudopeltula heppioides (where the hymenium subdivides into small excipulate units), P. myriocarpa develops true stromatic fruiting bodies.

A 2024 phylogenetic reclassification of the Lichinomycetes did not support recognizing a separate family for Gloeoheppia (Gloeoheppiaceae), and instead treated the genus within Lichinaceae.

== Description ==
The thallus is olive-colored and made up of squamulose to peltate units, with margins that curve downward and a lower surface that is tomentose. Individual squamules may be single or clustered, often convex to somewhat spherical, and can reach about 7 mm in length. They attach to the substrate by rhizoidal strands that may merge into an umbilicus. In cross-section, the thallus is typically about 380–480 μm thick and includes a well-developed tomentum layer.

Fruiting bodies are produced in dark brown to blackish stromata that form spot-like patches (often more or less rosette-shaped) up to about 2 mm wide. The spore-bearing layer (the hymenium) is about 110–115 μm tall and becomes subdivided by sterile hyphal strands. In iodine it stains deep blue and then turns brown-red, while the subhymenium stains bluish. The cylindrical asci usually contain 6–8 spores (about 75–95 × 11–11.5 μm), and the ascospores are mainly simple, ellipsoid, and colorless, although two-celled spores were occasionally observed. Pycnidia are immersed and can be large, producing small rod-shaped conidia. Henssen described the development of the stromata as a cumulative process: small apothecia form densely, the hymenium becomes partitioned, and additional apothecia arise within or beneath older tissue, producing a single, horizontally spreading stromatic patch with uneven ridges or wart-like projections.

== Habitat and distribution ==
Pseudopeltula myriocarpa is a calcicolous lichen that grows on carbonate rocks, reported from dolomite and limestone. The type specimen was collected in Mexico (Querétaro, near Jalpan de Serra) on dolomite on a dry slope, and the paratype was collected in Guerrero (18 km SSE of Taxco) on a limestone cliff at about 1,360 m elevation. In Henssen's 1995 treatment, the species was known from only these two Mexican localities. It has since been recorded from the Guánica State Forest in Puerto Rico, and the Isla de la Juventud in Cuba.
