= Gloeoheppia squamulosa =

Scientific classification
- Kingdom: Fungi
- Division: Ascomycota
- Class: Lichinomycetes
- Order: Lichinales
- Family: Lichinaceae
- Genus: Gloeoheppia
- Species: G. squamulosa

Binomial name
- Gloeoheppia squamulosa (Zahlbr.) M.Schultz (2007)

Synonyms
- Psorotichia squamulosa Zahlbr. (1902)

Species of lichen-forming fungus

Gloeoheppia squamulosa is a species of cyanolichen in the family Lichinaceae. It forms small, dark olive-brown, shield-shaped scales on bare soil and thin soil over rock in arid habitats. The species was originally described in 1902 as Psorotichia squamulosa and was transferred to Gloeoheppia in 2007 based on its growth form and ecology. It occurs in the southwestern United States and northwestern Mexico, from low desert to montane woodland.

== Taxonomy ==
Gloeoheppia squamulosa is a cyanolichen that was originally described from the American Southwest as Psorotichia squamulosa by Alexander Zahlbruckner (1902), based on material collected by Hermann Edward Hasse on granitic rocks near Palm Springs (Riverside County, California). Matthias Schultz (2007) later re-examined the type material and additional specimens from the region and concluded that the species had been placed in the wrong genus.

Schultz transferred the species to Gloeoheppia, publishing the new combination Gloeoheppia squamulosa. The change was based mainly on growth form and ecology: unlike Psorotichia species (typically black, strongly gelatinous crusts on bare rock), G. squamulosa forms small, peltate (shield-like) squamules on soil and lacks the stalk-like internal structures often developed beneath the fruiting bodies in Psorotichia. Schultz also noted that Gloeoheppia and Pseudopeltula can be difficult to separate morphologically, but preferred placement in Gloeoheppia because it is the older name and G. squamulosa matches it well in overall characters.

== Description ==
The thallus is dark olive-brown, sometimes with a faint grayish, frosted coating (pruina), and paler on the underside. It is made of very brittle, peltate squamules usually 0.3–1.5 mm wide, though they can become minutely lobed and reach about 3–4 mm across. The squamules are contiguous to overlapping (imbricate), with margins that may lift up or curve down and can become wavy with age; the surface is smooth at first, later developing cracks. Attachment is by a small central holdfast (an umbilicus) formed by bundled rhizohyphae that anchor the thallus to the substrate.

Internally, the thallus has a dense, net-like arrangement of fungal tissue around round, single-celled cyanobacterial partners about 10–15 μm in diameter. The apothecia are round, about 0.25–0.4 mm wide, and are immersed to partly emergent, with a persistent thalline margin and a slightly sunken disc that is dark reddish to yellow-brown or nearly black. The spore-producing layer (hymenium) is about 100 μm high and stains blue in an iodine test (IKI+). Asci are thin-walled and usually contain 12–16 ascospores (sometimes as few as 8, or up to about 24). The spores are colorless, simple, ellipsoid to somewhat spindle-shaped, and about 9–12.5 × 4–6 μm. Pycnidia were not observed in the material studied.

== Habitat and distribution ==
The species grows on bare soil as part of biological soil crust communities, and it can also occur on thin soil accumulations over rock. More rarely, it has been found on soft, disintegrating rock. Collections come from a range of settings, from low-elevation desert sites up into montane pinyon–juniper habitats, suggesting it tolerates both hot, exposed ground and cooler, higher-elevation open woodland conditions where soil crusts persist.

In North America, it is known from the southwestern United States (recorded from southern California and southern Arizona) and northwestern Mexico, including multiple localities across Baja California and in Sonora.
