= Gloeoheppia erosa =

Scientific classification
- Kingdom: Fungi
- Division: Ascomycota
- Class: Lichinomycetes
- Order: Lichinales
- Family: Lichinaceae
- Genus: Gloeoheppia
- Species: G. erosa

Binomial name
- Gloeoheppia erosa (J.Steiner) Marton (1982)

Synonyms
- Heppia erosa J.Steiner (1902)

Species of lichen-forming fungus

Gloeoheppia erosa is a species of squamulose lichen in the family Lichinaceae. It forms small, blackish, very brittle scales on calcareous soil and rock in arid environments. The species was originally described in 1902 from Algeria and was later transferred to Gloeoheppia based on its thallus structure and development. It is known from desert and semi-desert regions around the Mediterranean, including North Africa, the Canary Islands, the Middle East, and the Arabian Peninsula.

== Taxonomy ==
Gloeoheppia erosa was originally described as Heppia erosa by Julius Steiner (1902), based on a single collection from earthy limestone, and the protologue notes that apothecia (fruiting bodies) were absent. It was later reclassified in Gloeoheppia by Kela Marton (1982). Marton and Galun treated this transfer as provisional, arguing that Steiner's original account of the thallus structure was inaccurate and that the species better matches Gloeoheppia in thallus anatomy and developmental characters (including early apothecial development and pycnospore form). The type material was collected in Algeria (Ghardaïa, Schebka Plateau of the Sahara) on limestone at about 600 m elevation, and the holotype is housed in the herbarium of the University of Vienna (WU).

Aino Henssen reported that study of mature apothecia supported Marton's placement of the species in Gloeoheppia. She characterised the species by its very brittle, blackish squamules with a rough surface, and by the production of amphigenous diaspores (vegetative propagules formed on both thallus surfaces). Two morphotypes were recognised: one matching the holotype (thin thallus, often raised margins, very rough surface, larger apothecia) and another with a more depressed thallus and smaller apothecia. The first is known from Algeria, Israel, and the Canary Islands, while the second was reported only from the Canary Islands.

== Description ==
The thallus (lichen body) is made of small squamules and is blackish and very brittle, reaching about 4 mm across. Marton and Galun suggested that its marked brittleness reflects a sparse, net-like hyphal structure and the lack of a gelatinous thallus, and they observed granules that can break from the thallus margin and may act as diaspores. Its surface is rough, and the margin may be raised in places and partly break up. In cross-section, the thallus is about 150–330 micrometres (μm) thick. Vegetative diaspores can be produced on both sides of the thallus.

Apothecia are urn-shaped, typically 1–3 per squamule (sometimes up to 10), and are about 0.6–0.8 mm wide, reaching around 1.2 mm when surrounded by a thalline margin; the disc is usually brown but can be blackish. Both the hymenium and subhymenium are strongly iodine-positive (I+ deep blue). The hymenium is (88–)150–190 μm tall and the subhymenium 20–70 μm, with an exciple 10–35 μm thick. The asci are 8-spored and cylindrical to obclavate (about 65–78 × 6–9.5 μm), and the ascospores are simple (rarely 1-septate) and measure about 9.5–13 × 5–9.5 μm. Pycnidia were observed in section as spherical structures about 155 μm in diameter. Internally, Henssen reported that the thallus and apothecia closely resemble those of G. turgida, with hyphae forming a mesh around colonies of the cyanobiont and a stalk structure built from thallus tissue plus a rhizoidal strand.

== Habitat and distribution ==
Gloeoheppia erosa has been reported from calcareous soil and from volcanic rock. Henssen noted that fertile collections (with apothecia) were known only from the Canary Islands, specifically Fuerteventura and Lanzarote, and she cited additional reports based on sterile material from Spain, Algeria, and Tunisia. The specimens she examined included material from xerophytic scrub zones on Fuerteventura (on soil under boulders) and from lava fields and lowland scrub on Lanzarote (on soil and on volcanic rock), along with sterile collections from Israel on soil and calcareous rock.

In Israel, the species was reported as common on marlaceous soil in the Arabah Valley and the Judean Desert, with records from the entrance to Wadi Amram, the Shezaf Hills, Wadi Orner, Wadi Baraq, and Mt Isai. It has also been documented from Kuwait and south Yemen. In Saudi Arabia, it has been recorded from Al-Qassim Province, where it was collected from flat, exposed calcite plates on open desert pavement, including samples growing on the sheltered undersides of rocks. Metabarcoding of associated bacteria in Saudi Arabian material found communities dominated by genera such as Arthrobacter, Bradyrhizobium, and Halomonas.
