= Pseudopeltula necrocorticata =

Scientific classification
- Kingdom: Fungi
- Division: Ascomycota
- Class: Lichinomycetes
- Order: Lichinales
- Family: Lichinaceae
- Genus: Pseudopeltula
- Species: P. necrocorticata

Binomial name
- Pseudopeltula necrocorticata Büdel & M.Schultz (2011)
- Type locality: NE of Ciudad Insurgentes, Mexico

Species of lichen-forming fungus

Pseudopeltula necrocorticata is a species of cyanolichen in the family Lichinaceae. It forms small, yellowish-olive, scale-like lobes up to about 3.5 mm across on rock and gravel in desert habitats. The species is unusual in having a surface layer formed partly from dead cyanobacterial cells, which gives rise to its name. It is known from the Sonoran Desert region of northwestern Mexico, where it may be overlooked because it resembles small species of Peltula.

== Taxonomy ==
Pseudopeltula necrocorticata was described as new in 2011 by Burkhard Büdel and Matthias Schultz from specimens collected in the Sonoran Desert region of Baja California (Mexico). Although its yellowish-olive, peltate thallus can look much like small species of Peltula, its internal anatomy is closer to Gloeoheppia, and it is placed in Pseudopeltula because its apothecia (fruiting bodies) develop a characteristically subdivided hymenium. The species epithet necrocorticata refers to the "necrotic" cortex-like outer layer formed when the uppermost cyanobacterial cells die and become incorporated into the thallus surface.

== Description ==
The thallus forms small, shield-shaped (peltate) scales that are yellowish olive, often slightly concave, and up to about 3.5 mm across; the margins typically curve downward, and the upper surface is often cracked or wrinkled. The thallus is anchored to the substrate by rhizine-like strands and is roughly 186–286 μm thick in cross-section. A cortex-like upper layer is present and is covered by a thin dead layer (epinecral layer); this "phenocortex" has a structure similar to the photobiont layer but includes dead cyanobacterial cells. The photobiont (photosynthetic partner) is a single-celled cyanobacterian (cells about 4.3–5.8 μm wide), thought to be related to Chroococcidiopsis. A distinct, photobiont-free medulla (inner layer) is not developed.

Apothecia are immersed to urceolate and can reach about 1.5 mm in diameter, with reddish-brown to dark-brown discs. In iodine (IKI), the hymenium and subhymenium stain blue before shifting to red-brown, and the hymenium is commonly split into multiple partial hymenia by sterile tissue. Asci are 8-spored, and the ascospores are ellipsoid and non-septate (sometimes poorly developed). Pycnidia have not been observed.

== Habitat and distribution ==
The species is known from northwestern Mexico in the greater Sonoran Desert region. Collections are from exposed desert habitats on gravel and bare rock, including thornbush scrub (with plants such as Acacia, Lycium, and Prosopis), coastal shrub, and rocky hills and floodplains, from roughly 50 to 700 m (160 to 2,300 ft) elevation. Reported localities include Baja California Sur, Baja California, Sonora, and Sinaloa. Because it closely resembles small Peltula species, it may be overlooked or misidentified in other dry regions.
