= Euura triandrae =

Scientific classification
- Domain: Eukaryota
- Kingdom: Animalia
- Phylum: Arthropoda
- Class: Insecta
- Order: Hymenoptera
- Suborder: Symphyta
- Family: Tenthredinidae
- Genus: Euura
- Species: E. triandrae

Binomial name
- Euura triandrae (Benson, 1941)

Synonyms
- Pontania triandrae Benson

Species of sawfly

Euura triandrae is a species of sawfly belonging to the family Tenthredinidae (common sawflies). The larvae feed on the leaves of almond willow (Salix triandra) and was first described in 1941.

== Description of the gall ==
The gall is an ovoid, bean-shaped gall, up to 8 mm x 4 mm in size, with a hard thick red wall when occupied. There are often two galls to a leaf, on either side of the midrib, and they are almost equally prominent on the both sides of a leaf. Galls of E. triandrae are found on almond willow (S. triandra). There are usually two broods in a year (i.e. bivoltine.

Euura triandrae is one of three closely related species in the Euura proxima group. The others members of the group are,

- E. bridgmanii (Cameron, 1883)
- E. proxima (Serville, 1823)

== Distribution ==
This species has been found in Great Britain (England), the Netherlands, Norway and Sweden.
