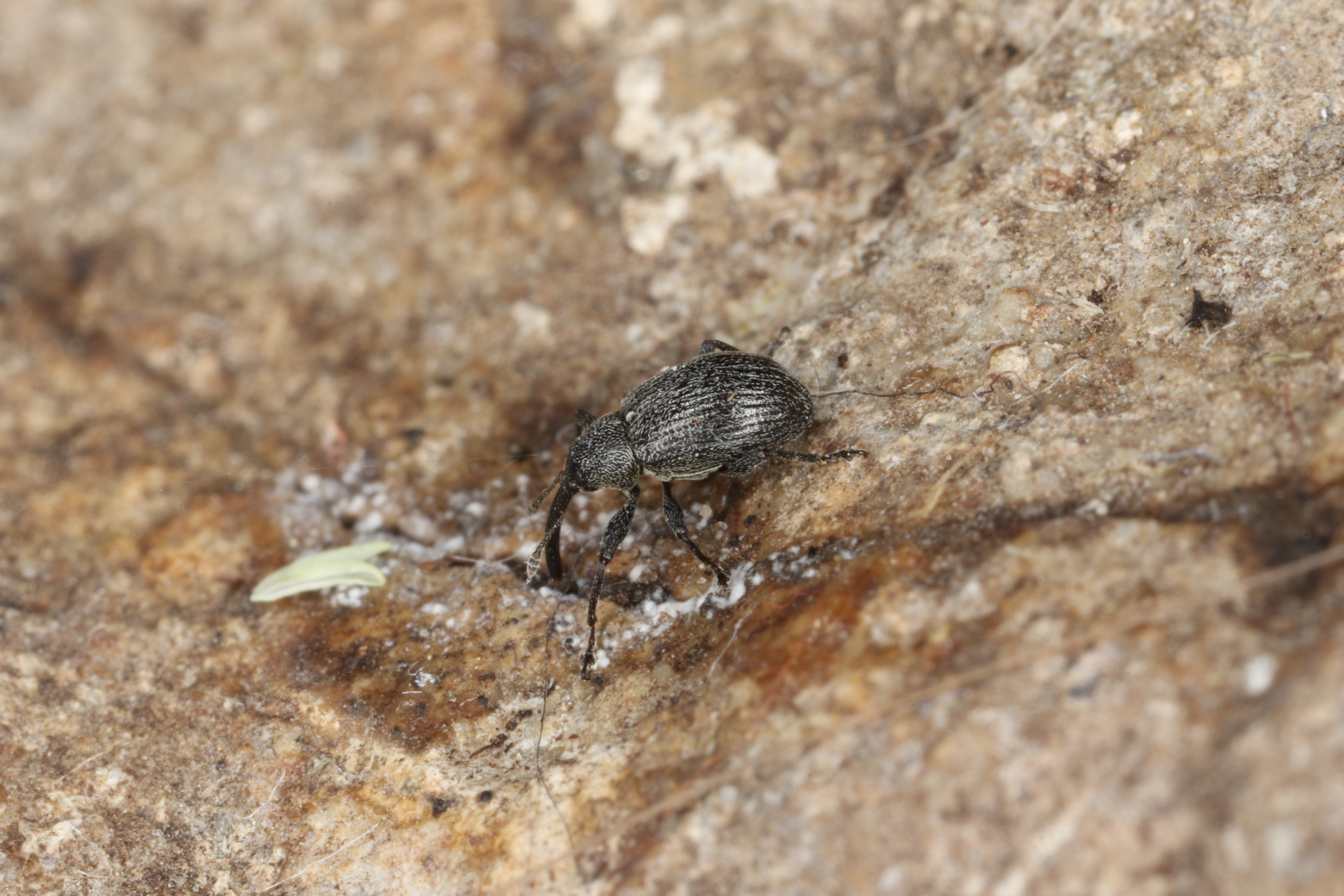

Scientific classification
- Domain: Eukaryota
- Kingdom: Animalia
- Phylum: Arthropoda
- Class: Insecta
- Order: Coleoptera
- Suborder: Polyphaga
- Infraorder: Cucujiformia
- Family: Curculionidae
- Genus: Archarius
- Species: A. pyrrhoceras

Binomial name
- Archarius pyrrhoceras Marsham, 1802

= Archarius pyrrhoceras =

Species of beetle

Archarius pyrrhoceras is a species of weevil native to Europe. The weevils are inquilines as larvae, living in galls of Cynipidae wasps formed on oak trees.
