= Saharo-Arabian region =

Floristic region of the Middle East and North Africa

In botanical geography, the Saharo-Arabian region is a floristic region in the Holarctic kingdom, covered by hot deserts, semideserts and savanna. The region occupies the temperate parts of the Sahara desert, Sinai Peninsula, Arabian Peninsula (geographically defined), Southern Palestine and Lower Mesopotamia.

The region was proposed by Armen Takhtajan.

== Flora ==
Plant life usually consists of only a handful of species, which are mostly found in natural depressions in the ground or rocky pavements. Much of its flora is shared with the neighboring Mediterranean and Irano-Turanian regions of the Holarctic kingdom and Sudano-Zambezian region of the Paleotropical kingdom.

However, about a quarter of the species, especially in the families Asteraceae, Brassicaceae and Chenopodiaceae, are endemic. Some of the endemic genera are Nucularia, Fredolia, Agathophora, Muricaria, Nasturtiopsis, Zilla, Oudneya, Foleyola, Lonchophora, Gymnarrhena, Lifago.
