= Gloeoheppia rugosa =

Scientific classification
- Kingdom: Fungi
- Division: Ascomycota
- Class: Lichinomycetes
- Order: Lichinales
- Family: Lichinaceae
- Genus: Gloeoheppia
- Species: G. rugosa

Binomial name
- Gloeoheppia rugosa Henssen (1995)

Species of lichen-forming fungus

Gloeoheppia rugosa is a species of lichen-forming fungus in the family Lichinaceae. It forms small, brownish, stalked scales with a distinctly wrinkled surface, and may become somewhat shrubby in form. The species was described in 1995 from Lanzarote in the Canary Islands, where it grows on volcanic rock. A tentative record from southern California suggests it may also occur in North America.

== Taxonomy ==
Gloeoheppia rugosa was first formally described by Aino Henssen in 1995. Within the genus, G. rugosa is separated from similar species by its wrinkled (rugose), partly somewhat fruticose thallus that is not brittle. Henssen described it from material collected on Lanzarote (Canary Islands), in a lava field near Playa Mujeres, close to Punta de Papagayo, at about 50 m elevation. The species epithet rugosa refers to the rough, wrinkled surface of the thallus.

In a survey of lichens from southern California, Kerry Knudsen and colleagues reported a sterile collection from the San Jacinto Mountains (Riverside County) that anatomically matches Gloeoheppia and keys to G. rugosa in Henssen's treatment of the genus. They treated the identification as tentative because no apothecia were present.

== Description ==
The thallus (lichen body) of Gloeoheppia rugosa is made of small scale-like lobes (squamules) that may become somewhat shrubby (subfruticose), and it is stalked and brownish, reaching about 5 mm across with a 4–5 mm-tall stalk; the surface is distinctly rugose. The thallus forms clustered, irregular, often upright areoles or small squamules, with a conspicuously rough surface that is coarsely granular to wrinkled.

Like other members of the genus, it partners with a single-celled cyanobacterium, and the fungal hyphae form a reticulum (a net-like structure) around the photobiont colonies. In sections, the thallus is typically 200–380 (sometimes up to 455) μm thick.

Fruiting bodies (apothecia) are rare; when present, they are urn-shaped (urceolate) when young and later become adnate, up to about 1 mm wide, with a broad, flat, blackish disc and a rugose thalline margin. In iodine, the hymenium becomes only faintly bluish while the subhymenium turns blue. The hymenium is 98–120 μm thick and the subhymenium 23–47 μm, with an exciple about 10–20 μm thick at the base and 20–30 μm at the margin. The asci are cylindrical and 8-spored (about 65–85 × 6–7(–10.5) μm), and the ascospores measure roughly 12–13 × 5–6 μm; pycnidia were not observed. Henssen also reported regular, short-celled meshes in the hyphal reticulum, and mentioned that colonies of various cyanobacteria can be enclosed within the thallus and rhizoidal strand.

== Habitat and distribution ==
Gloeoheppia rugosa was described from Lanzarote (Canary Islands), where it occurs on volcanic rock in seepage tracks and grows with other members of the Lichinaceae and cyanobacteria. It has also been reported from North America, based on sterile material collected in the San Jacinto Mountains of southern California on inclined marble boulders at 1,720 m elevation; the authors regarded the identification as tentative because the samples lacked fruiting bodies.
