= Pseudopeltula dicyanophora =

Scientific classification
- Kingdom: Fungi
- Division: Ascomycota
- Class: Lichinomycetes
- Order: Lichinales
- Family: Lichinaceae
- Genus: Pseudopeltula
- Species: P. dicyanophora

Binomial name
- Pseudopeltula dicyanophora Henssen (1995)

Species of lichen-forming fungus

Pseudopeltula dicyanophora is a species of cyanolichen in the family Lichinaceae. It forms small, olive-green, shield-shaped scales on calcareous rock. The species is unusual in having two different cyanobacterial partners: a primary single-celled cyanobacterium throughout the thallus, and a secondary filamentous cyanobacterium housed in internal structures called cephalodia. It is known from the Caribbean and the Seychelles.

== Taxonomy ==
Pseudopeltula dicyanophora was described as a new species in 1995 by the lichenologist Aino Henssen, in the same paper that established the genus Pseudopeltula in the family Gloeoheppiaceae (order Lichinales). In Henssen's concept, Pseudopeltula includes small, olive-colored, squamulose to peltate cyanolichens with immersed apothecia whose mature structure is more complex than in related genera. The species epithet dicyanophora refers to the thallus having two different cyanobacterial partners: a primary, single-celled cyanobiont and a second, filamentous cyanobiont housed in internal cephalodia.

In her remarks, Henssen distinguished P. dicyanophora from the similar P. myriocarpa by its non-stromatic fruiting bodies, the lack of amyloid (iodine-positive) reactions, its cushionlike thalli with large cavities and an irregular internal hyphal arrangement, and the presence of internal cephalodia. She also noted that its clustered, immersed apothecia are confined to depressions in the thallus and that sterile strands subdivide the hymenium, features she interpreted as steps toward a more stromatic fruiting structure within the group.

== Description ==
The thallus is olive-green and squamulose-peltate (made of small, shield-shaped scales), with individual squamules about 1–6 mm across, attached to the substrate by an umbilicus. The upper surface is smooth and slightly shiny, while the lower surface is tomentose. The squamules are usually bullate (blistered) with incised margins. In cross-section, the thallus is much thicker in the center (about 650–700 μm) than at the margin (about 200–250 μm) and contains conspicuous internal cavities and cephalodia.

Microscopically, the fungal hyphae (mostly about 3–7 μm thick) form an irregular network around colonies of the primary cyanobiont (suggested to be a Gloeocapsa-type cyanobacterium with cells about 2.5–6 μm in diameter), with longer hyphal segments spanning the cavity spaces. The cephalodia develop within the cavities and contain a filamentous cyanobiont (suggested to be Calothrix), with trichomes about 7–12 μm thick; as they mature, the filaments become enveloped by fungal hyphae and may become strongly distorted. The apothecia are immersed and aggregated in depressions, with reddish-brown discs up to about 0.3 mm wide. The hymenium and subhymenium are non-amyloid (do not stain blue in iodine tests) and are divided by sterile strands, and the asci are cylindrical with (6–)8 spores. Immature ascospores were reported as ellipsoid and about 9.5–12 × 6–7 μm, and immersed pycnidia produce small rod-shaped conidia.

== Habitat and distribution ==
Henssen reported Pseudopeltula dicyanophora as growing on calcareous rock. The type material was collected on calcareous rocks on the Isla de la Juventud. In the protologue, the species was known only from that type locality. It has since been documented from Cuba, Puerto Rico, and the Seychelles.
