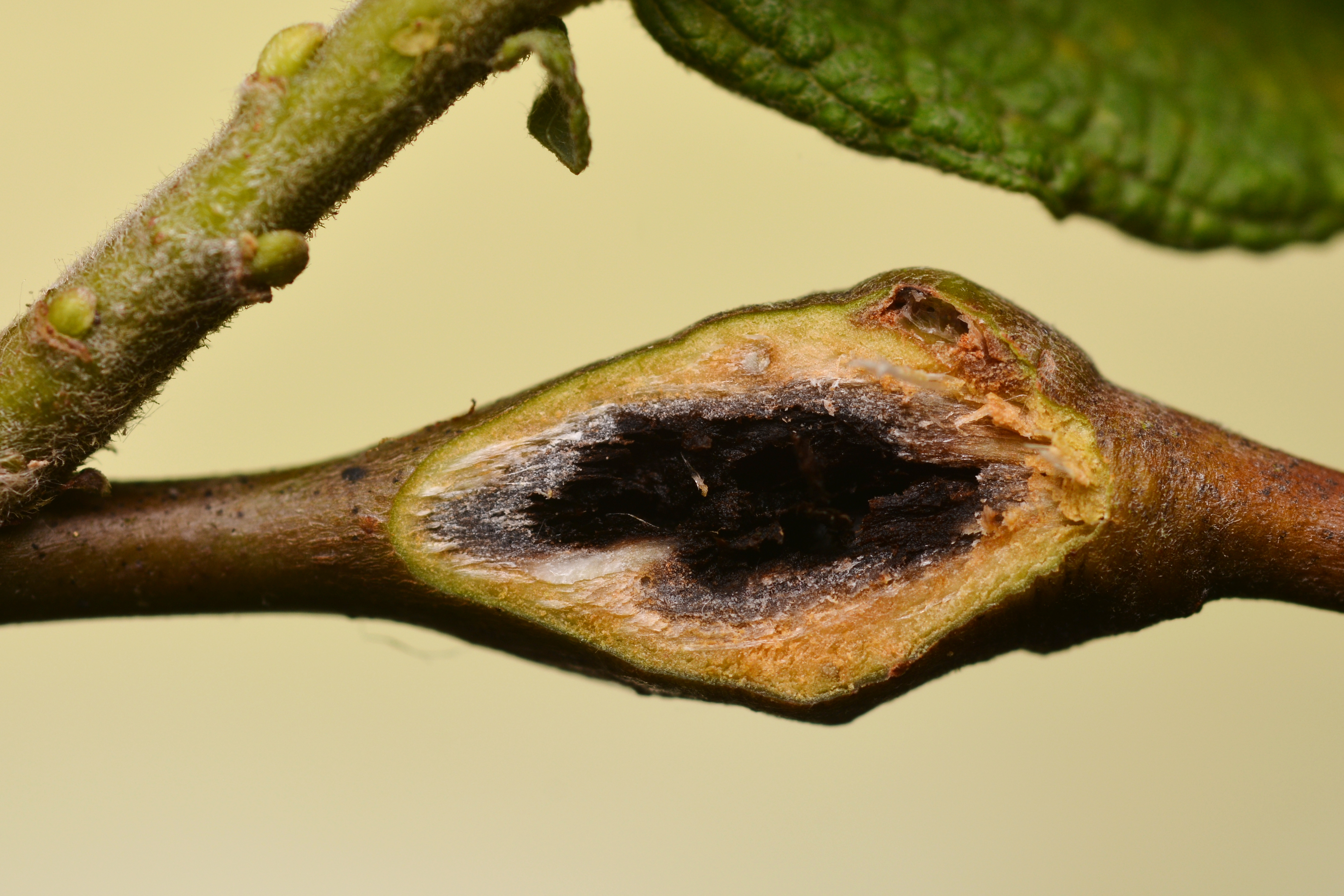

Scientific classification
- Kingdom: Animalia
- Phylum: Arthropoda
- Class: Insecta
- Order: Diptera
- Family: Cecidomyiidae
- Genus: Rabdophaga
- Species: R. pierreana

Binomial name
- Rabdophaga pierreana (Kieffer, 1909)

Synonyms
- Dasineura pierreana Perrisia pierreana Kieffer, 1909

= Rabdophaga pierreana =

Species of fly

Rabdophaga pierreana is a gall midge which forms galls on the young shoots of willow (Salix species). It was first described by Jean-Jacques Kieffer in 1909.

== Description ==
The gall is an ovoid swelling on a young shoot, with one large chamber containing up to twenty-two red larvae. In Britain the gall is found on eared willow (Salix aurita), elsewhere it has been found on S. caprea, S. cinerea and S. myrsinfolia (and possibly on S.hastata). The similar looking gall, R. dubiosa has many individual chambers with a yellow or light orange larvae in each.

== Distribution ==
Has been recorded from Belgium, France, Germany, Great Britain and Poland.
