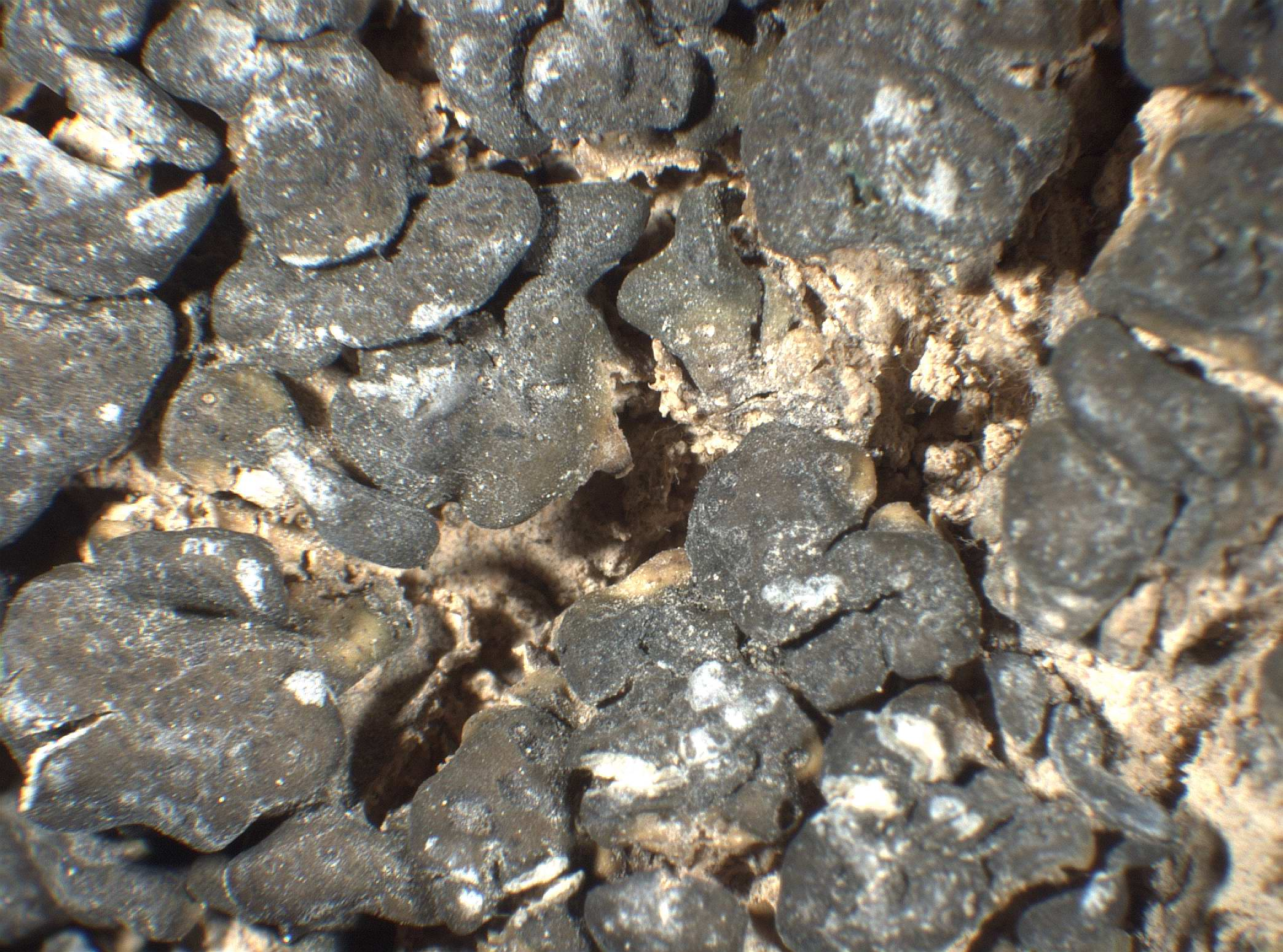

Scientific classification
- Kingdom: Fungi
- Division: Ascomycota
- Class: Lichinomycetes
- Order: Lichinales
- Family: Lichinaceae
- Genus: Gloeoheppia
- Species: G. turgida

Binomial name
- Gloeoheppia turgida (Ach.) Gyeln. (1935)

Synonyms
- Endocarpon turgidum Ach. (1810); Lichen hepaticus * turgidum (Ach.) Lam. (1813); Heppia turgida (Ach.) Nyl. (1887)

= Gloeoheppia turgida =

Species of lichen-forming fungus

Gloeoheppia turgida is a species of gelatinous lichen in the family Gloeoheppiaceae. The species was first described in 1810 by Erik Acharius as Endocarpon turgidum, based on a Swiss collection made by Johann Christoph Schleicher. It was transferred to the genus Gloeoheppia in 1935, and a later revision upheld Gloeoheppia as distinct from Heppia, and fixed the application of Acharius's name by designating Schleicher's specimen as the lectotype. The species forms small, scaly squamules up to 4 mm across that become strongly swollen and convex, with a dark olive to greenish-black upper surface that may carry a thin white, powdery pruina. It grows on calcareous soil or rock in warm, dry parts of the Mediterranean basin, in Macaronesia, and in the Saharo-Arabian region.

== Taxonomy ==
The species was first described by the Swedish lichenologist Erik Acharius in 1810, as Endocarpon turgidum. He based the species on Swiss material gathered on muddy ground by Johann Christoph Schleicher. In his diagnosis Acharius emphasised a thick, leathery, lobed brown thallus covered with a bluish pruina; a powdery-to-spongy underside; and irregular, blunt lobes that are somewhat inflated, flexuous and intricately folded. When moistened, the thallus turns a dark brown. Because the lobes are tightly crowded and contorted, the lichen appears swollen and strongly pleated or wrinkled. He also noted that what he interpreted as ostioles (openings) begin as minute convex points and, with age, become small, urn-shaped structures immersed in the thallus and scarcely marginate; according to Acharius, these were features that, together with the pruinose surface and overall thallus form, separated this species from others in its genus.

In 1935, Vilmos Kőfaragó-Gyelnik separated the species from Heppia because of its unusual (gloeocapsiform) photobiont and erected the genus Gloeoheppia for it. Later authors disagreed about whether Gloeoheppia should be kept distinct. Henssen's reassessment of thallus structure and apothecial development treated Gloeoheppia as separate from Heppia and placed it in the newly described family Gloeoheppiaceae (order Lichinales). In the same paper, she designated Schleicher's Swiss collection in Acharius's herbarium (H-ACH 861) as the lectotype of Endocarpon turgidum. Later authors disagreed about whether Gloeoheppia should be kept distinct, but Aino Henssen's reassessment of thallus structure and apothecial development reinstated Gloeoheppia as separate from Heppia and placed it in the newly described family Gloeoheppiaceae (order Lichinales). In 1995, Henssen designated Schleicher's Swiss collection in Acharius's herbarium (specimen H-ACH 861) as the lectotype of Endocarpon turgidum. A 2024 phylogenetic reclassification of the Lichinomycetes did not support recognising a separate family for Gloeoheppia (Gloeoheppiaceae), and instead treated the genus within Lichinaceae.

== Description ==
Gloeoheppia turgida has a squamulose (scaly) thallus made up of small, leaf-like lobes. These squamules are round to elongate and lobulate, sometimes overlapping, and become strongly convex and swollen, reaching up to about 4 mm across. Their margins curve downwards and are often rolled under, and the thallus is anchored to the substrate by coarse fungal hyphae. The thallus lacks a cortex and is attached by rhizoidal strands, and its hyphae form a network around a small, single-celled cyanobiont. The upper surface is smooth and dark olive to greenish black, becoming paler in shaded situations, and may carry a thin white, powdery deposit (a pruina); it is covered by a relatively thick layer of dead tissue. The underside is smooth, olive to pale flesh-coloured and lacks a differentiated cortex. The medulla contains an algal zone that extends through most, or sometimes all, of its depth. Where a lower algal-free zone is present it consists of tightly packed, paraplectenchymatous fungal cells.

Vegetative propagules such as isidia and soredia have not been reported. Sexual reproduction occurs in immersed apothecia (fruiting bodies) produced one to many per squamule; the exposed discs are dark brown to blackish and typically about 0.2–0.8 mm across, and the hymenium and subhymenium stain deep blue in iodine. The asci usually contain eight spores, but 10–12-spored asci have also been observed, and the colourless, ellipsoid ascospores measure about 10–14 by 6–8 μm.

Physiological measurements on thalli collected in the Judean Desert found that humid air alone did not activate positive net photosynthesis; instead, the lichen required wetting with liquid water. Immediately after spraying, net photosynthesis remained low (under 20% of its maximum), which the authors attributed to diffusion limitation in the water-saturated thallus. As the thallus slowly dried, photosynthetic activity persisted for several days, consistent with the species' strongly water-holding, "succulent" thallus structure and its adaptation to habitats where liquid water comes mainly from infrequent rain or rare dew events.

== Distribution ==
Gloeoheppia turgida has been collected on calcareous soil and rock in the Mediterranean, Macaronesian, and Saharo-Arabian regions. It has also been collected in xeric soil-lichen communities in the Judaean Desert (Israel), on the slopes of the Dead Sea near Ein Boqeq.
