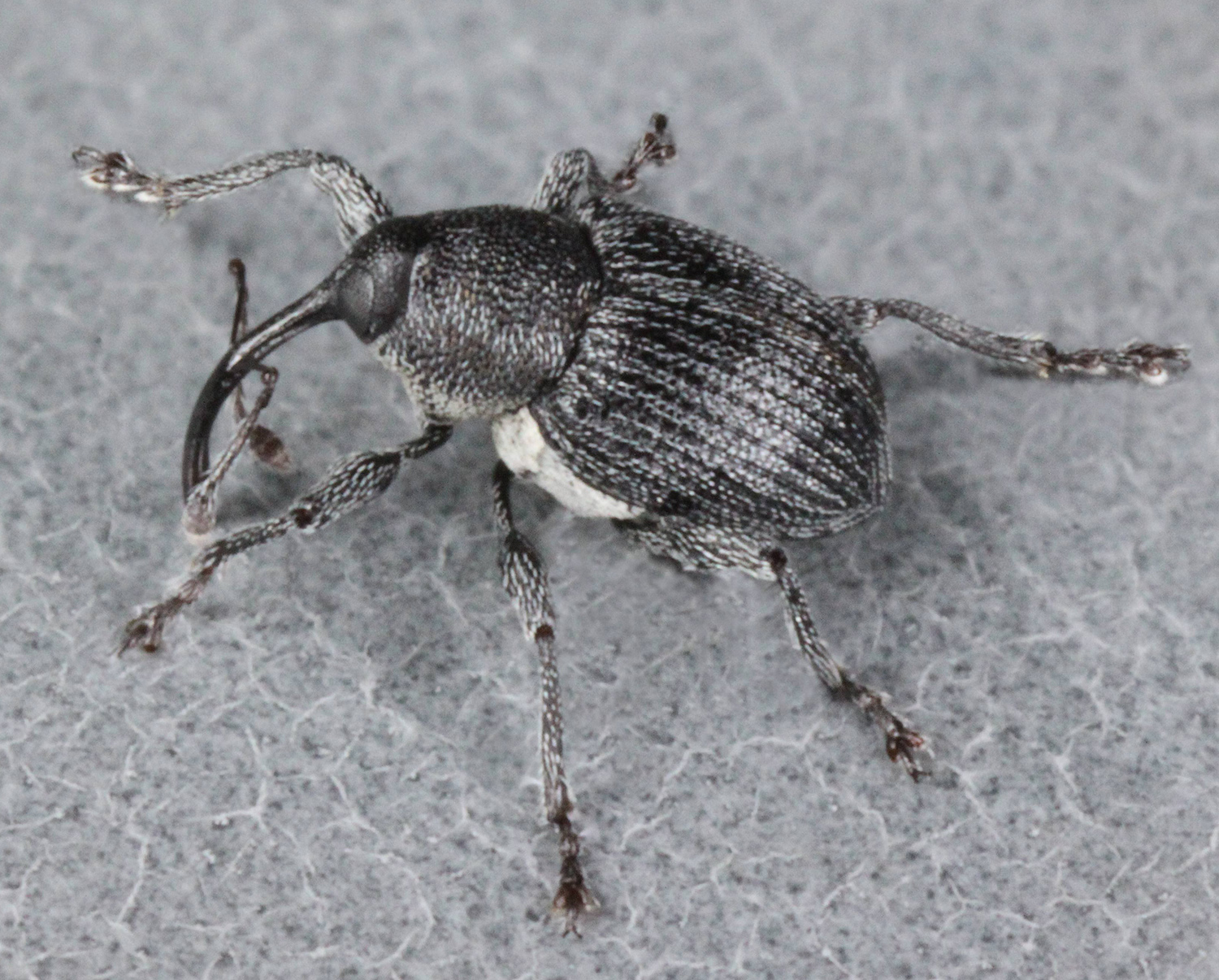
- Archarius salicivorus, Fenn's Moss, North Wales

Scientific classification
- Kingdom: Animalia
- Phylum: Arthropoda
- Clade: Pancrustacea
- Class: Insecta
- Order: Coleoptera
- Suborder: Polyphaga
- Infraorder: Cucujiformia
- Superfamily: Curculionoidea
- Family: Curculionidae
- Genus: Archarius
- Species: A. salicivorus

Binomial name
- Archarius salicivorus Paykull, 1792

= Archarius salicivorus =

Species of beetle

Archarius pyrrhoceras is a species of weevil native to Europe.
