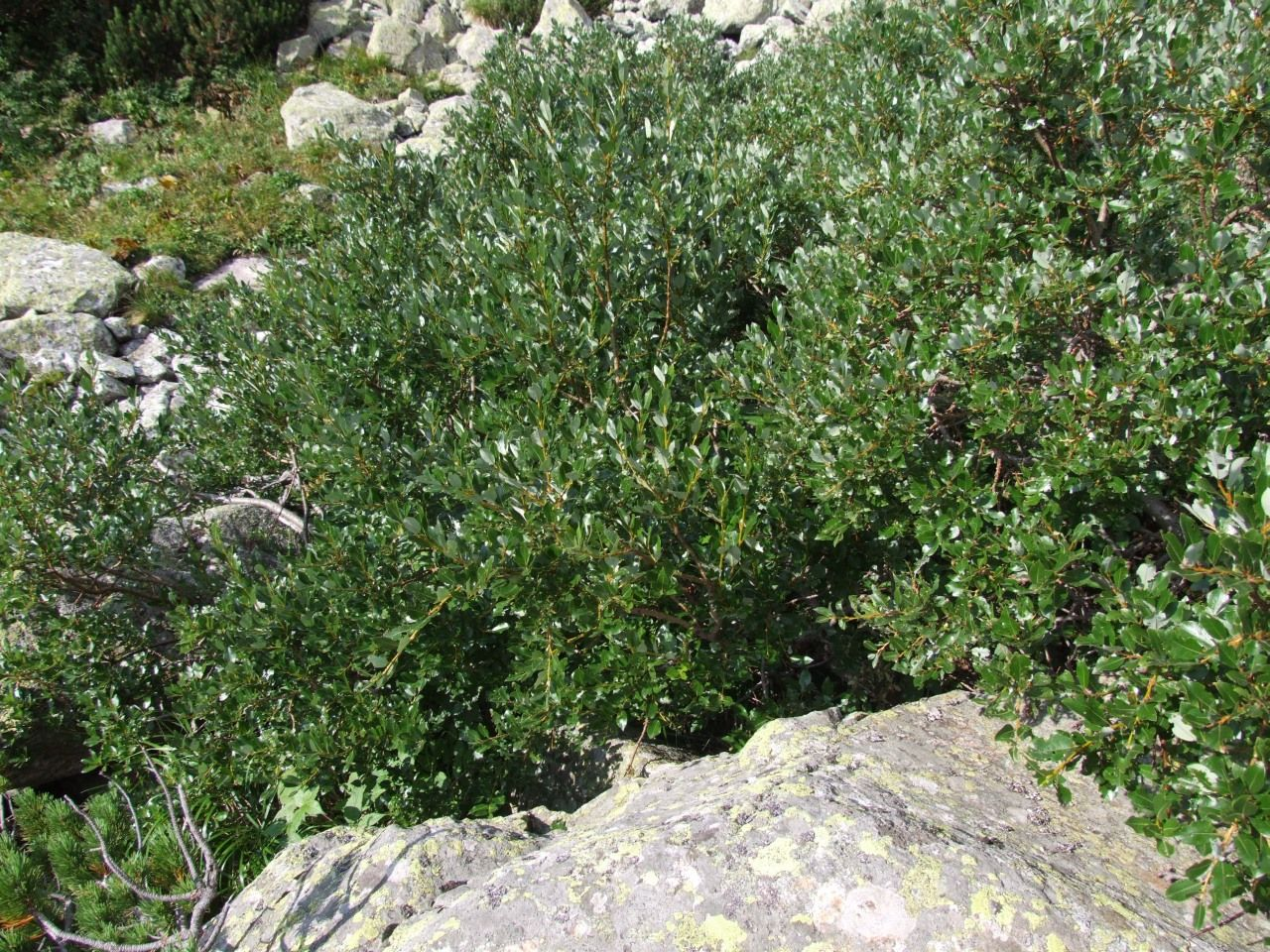

Conservation status
- Least Concern (IUCN 3.1)

Scientific classification
- Kingdom: Plantae
- Clade: Tracheophytes
- Clade: Angiosperms
- Clade: Eudicots
- Clade: Rosids
- Order: Malpighiales
- Family: Salicaceae
- Genus: Salix
- Species: S. helvetica

Binomial name
- Salix helvetica Vill.

Synonyms
- Salix lapponum subsp. helvetica (Vill.) Nyman; Salix velutina Schleich

= Salix helvetica =

Species of willow

Salix helvetica, the Swiss willow, is a scrubby willow species found in the Alps (from 1,700 to 2,700 m) and the Tatras portion of the western Carpathians (from 1,600 to 2,000 m). It is a naturally dwarf, erect shrub, growing to 50 cm (20 in) tall and broad, with silvery undersides on the leaves, and silvery catkins appearing with the leaves. It has gained the Royal Horticultural Society's Award of Garden Merit.
