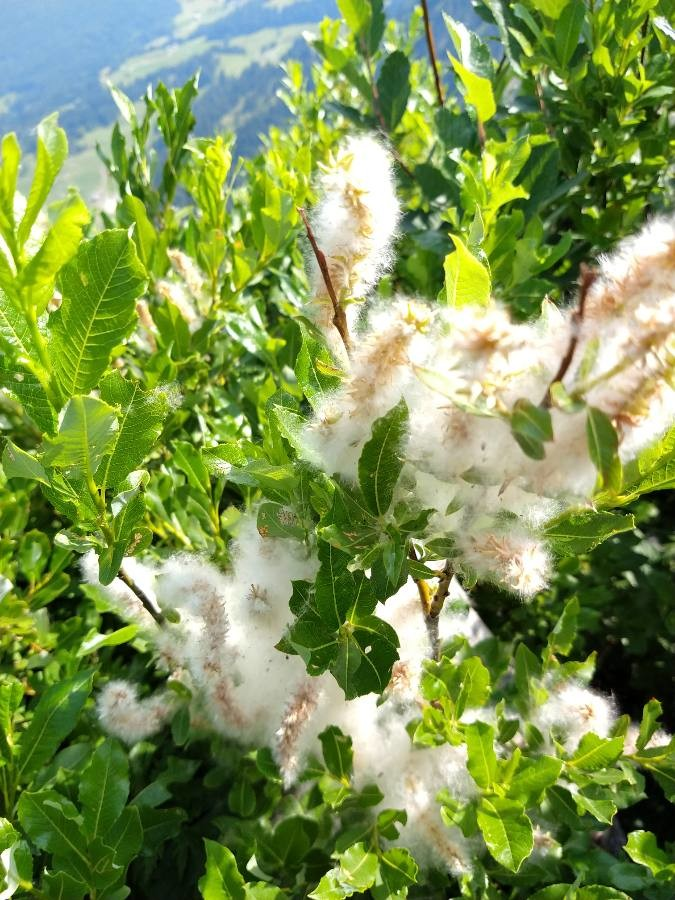
- Seeding
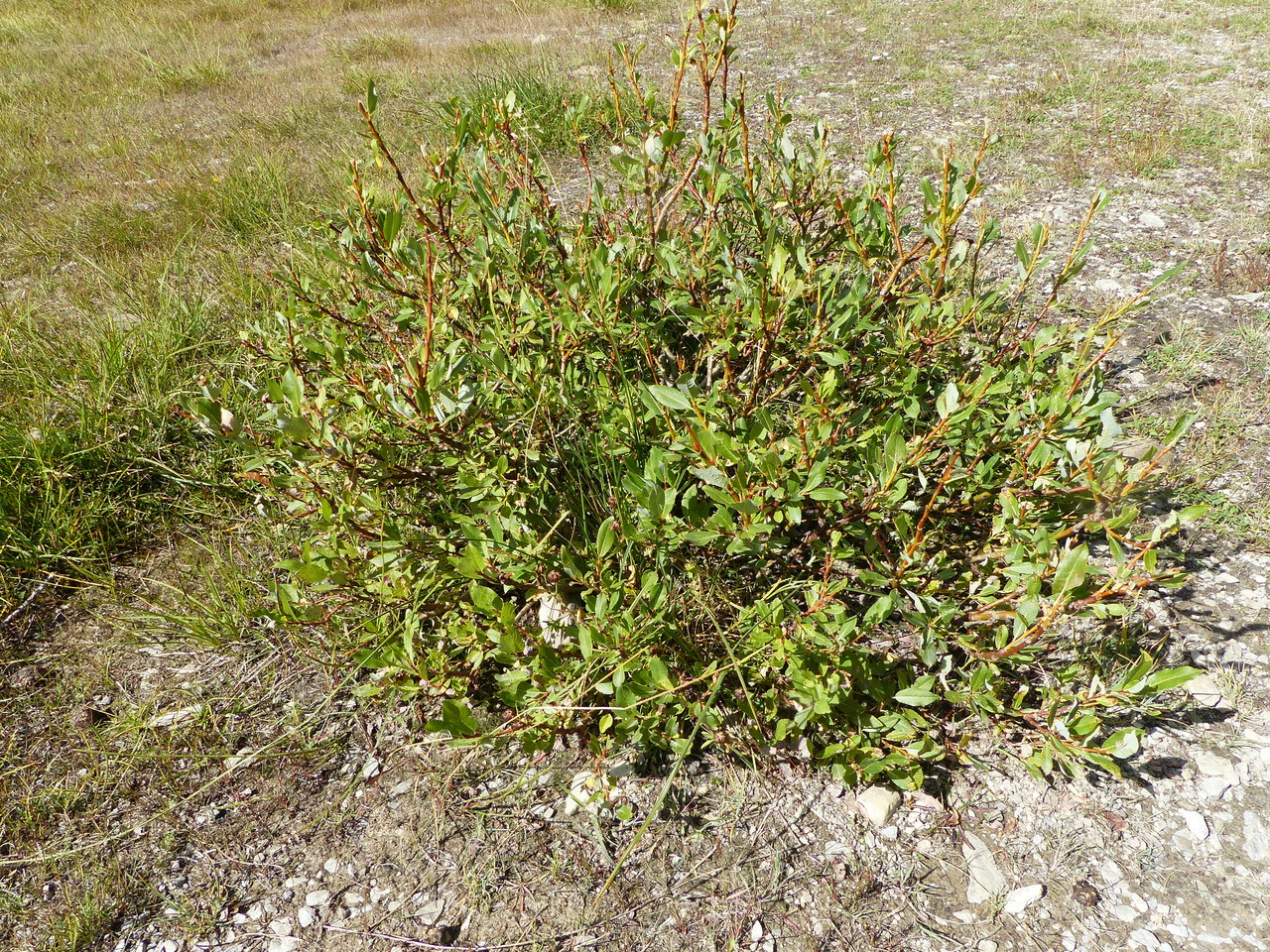
- Habit

Conservation status
- Least Concern (IUCN 3.1)

Scientific classification
- Kingdom: Plantae
- Clade: Tracheophytes
- Clade: Angiosperms
- Clade: Eudicots
- Clade: Rosids
- Order: Malpighiales
- Family: Salicaceae
- Genus: Salix
- Species: S. foetida

Binomial name
- Salix foetida Schleich. ex DC.

Synonyms
- List: Salix coruscans Jacq.; Salix decumbens Schleich.; Salix flavescens Host; Salix foetida var. acuta Gaudin; Salix foetida var. microphylla Gaudin; Salix foetida var. obtusa (Ser.) DC.; Salix formosa Willd.; Salix prunifolia var. angusta Ser.; Salix prunifolia var. obtusa Ser.

= Salix foetida =

Species of plant in the willow family

Salix foetida, the fishy willow, is a species of flowering plant in the family Salicaceae, native to the Alps, Pyrenees, and central Apennine Mountains of Europe. It is found only on continuously moist scree up to 2,600 m (8,500 ft) above sea level.

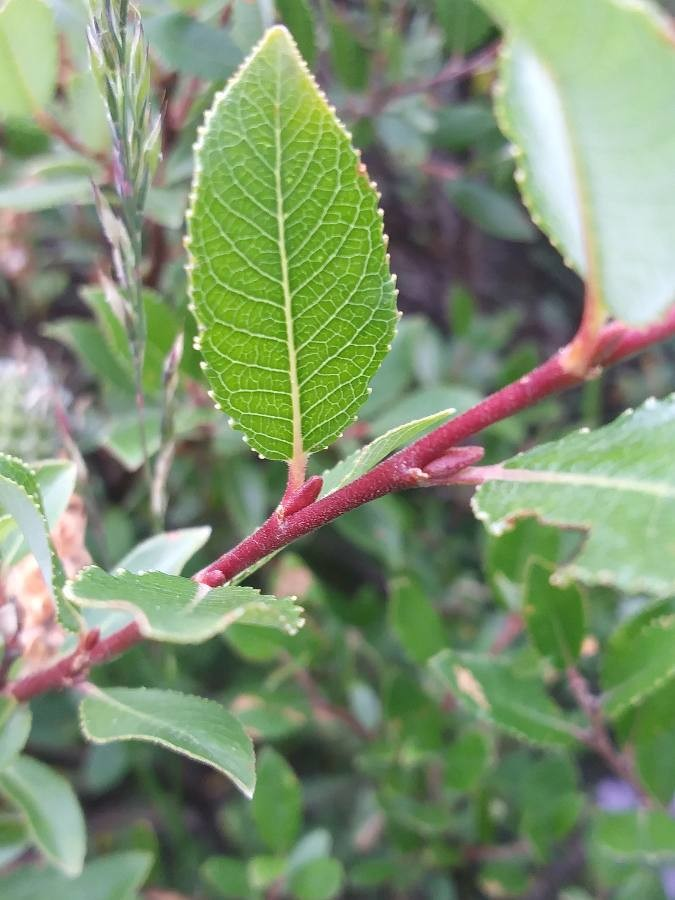
Young leaf and twig

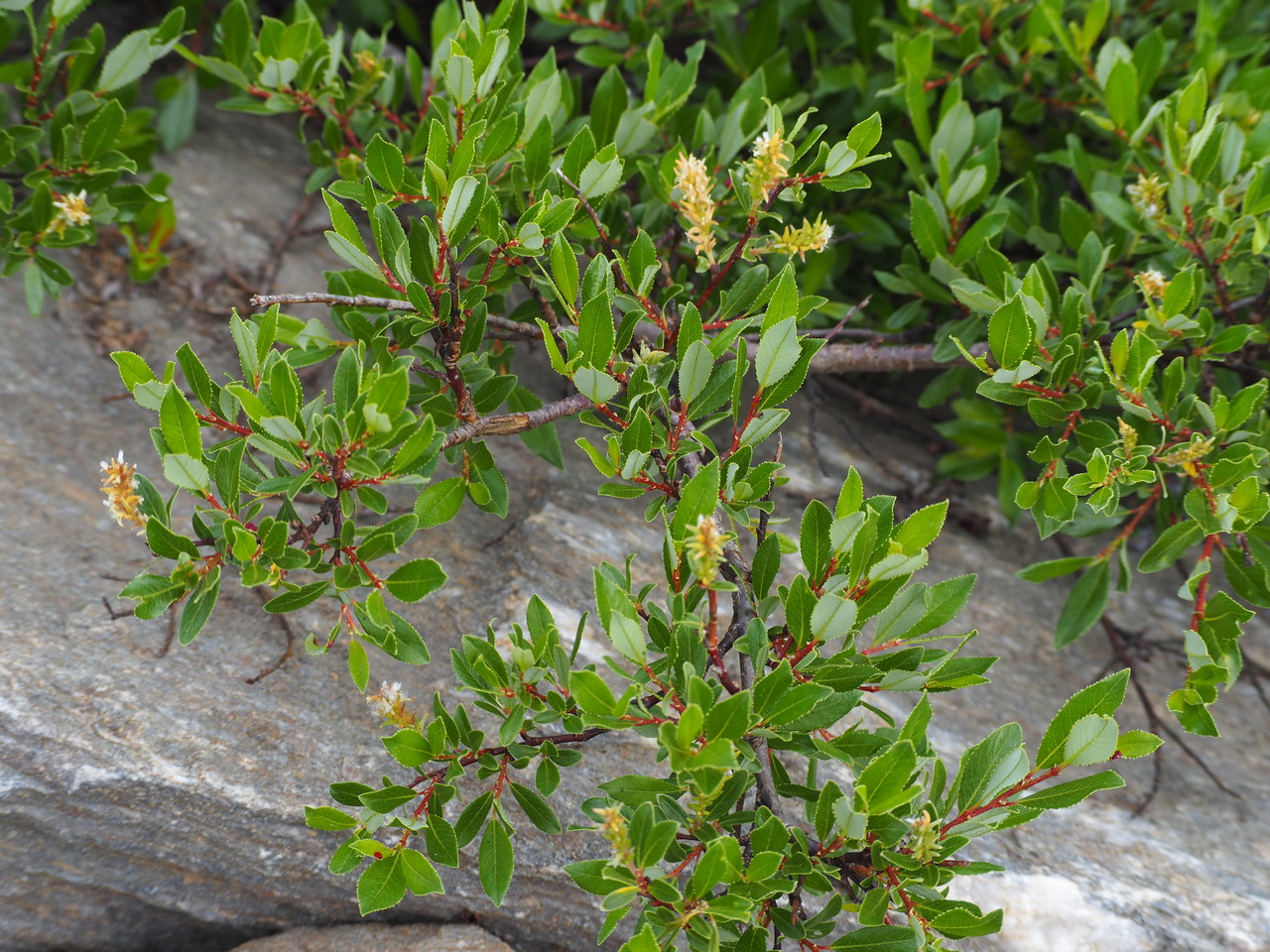
In bloom
