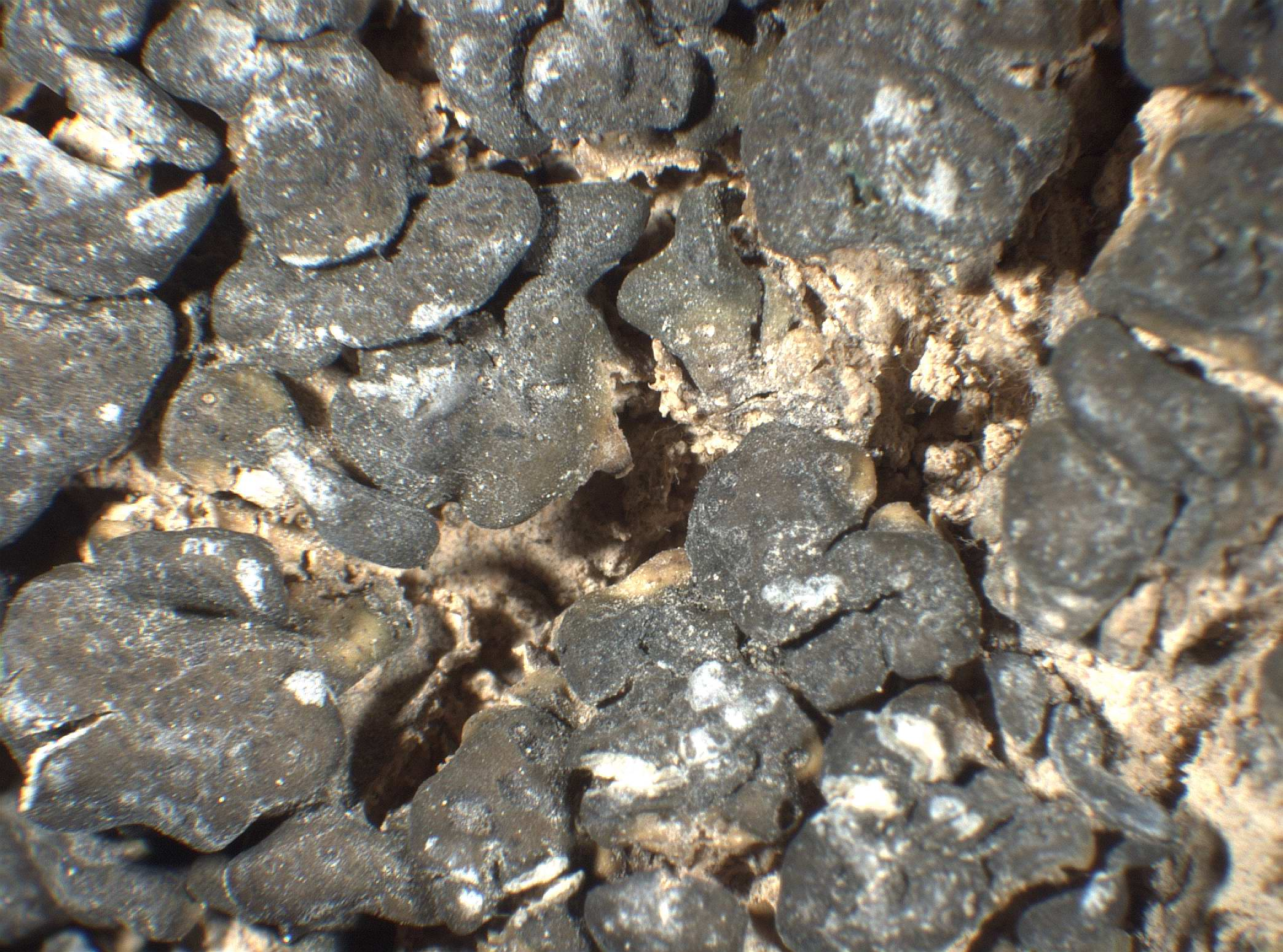
- Gloeoheppia turgida

Scientific classification
- Kingdom: Fungi
- Division: Ascomycota
- Class: Lichinomycetes
- Order: Lichinales
- Family: Lichinaceae
- Genus: Gloeoheppia; Gyeln. (1935)

Type species
- Gloeoheppia turgida (Ach.) Gyeln. (1935)

Species
- G. erosa G. polyspora G. rugosa G. squamulosa G. turgida

= Gloeoheppia =

Genus of lichens

Gloeoheppia is a genus of lichen-forming fungi in the family Lichinaceae. It comprises five species. Members of the genus form small, scaly to slightly shield-shaped patches that are usually dark brown, olive, or blackish, and many become more swollen when wet. They mostly live in warm, dry regions on calcareous soil or rock, where they often form part of biological soil crusts that help bind and stabilise bare ground. Gloeoheppia is distinguished from similar-looking lichens like Heppia by its internal structure, the nature of its photobiont, and details of its reproductive structures.

== Taxonomy ==
Gloeoheppia was first established as a genus by Vilmos Gyelnik in 1935, when he separated Heppia turgida (Ach.) Nyl. from the genus Heppia due to its distinctive 'gloeocapsiform' photobiont. The type species for the genus is Gloeoheppia turgida. Initially, the taxonomic position of Gloeoheppia was uncertain. Gyelnik originally placed it in the family Pyrenopsidaceae. Later, Josef Poelt included Gloeoheppia in the Lichinaceae.

However, studies by Aino Henssen in 1995 revealed that Gloeoheppia, along with two newly described genera, Pseudopeltula and Gudelia, warranted placement in a separate family. Henssen established the new family Gloeoheppiaceae to accommodate these genera, placing it within the order Lichinales. Within the genus Gloeoheppia, Henssen recognised four species; a fifth species was added in 2007. Gloeoheppia species are distinguished by differences in thallus morphology, number of ascospores per ascus, and amyloid reactions of the hymenium (colour change when treated with iodine-based stains).

A 2024 phylogenetic reclassification of the Lichinomycetes sampled two Gloeoheppia species and recovered them as a single lineage within Lichinaceae. On this basis, the authors did not support recognising a separate family (Gloeoheppiaceae) for Gloeoheppia. Prieto and co-authors did not include Gudelia or Pseudopeltula in their molecular dataset, but suggested that both are likely close to Gloeoheppia and belong in Lichinaceae as circumscribed in their study.

== Description ==
Gloeoheppia lichens have small, squamulose to moderately peltate thalli (lichen bodies) that are typically brown, olivaceous or blackish in colour. The thalli are attached to the substrate by rhizoidal strands – bundles of fungal filaments that act like roots. The upper surface of the thallus may be smooth, cracked, rough or wrinkled depending on the species.

Internally, Gloeoheppia has a homoiomerous structure, meaning the fungal hyphae and photobiont cells are not arranged in distinct layers. Instead, the fungal hyphae form a network around colonies of the photobiont, which in this genus is a single-celled cyanobacterium (blue-green alga), likely from the order Chroococcales. Small cavities or interstices are often present between the photobiont colonies.

The reproductive structures (apothecia) are immersed in the thallus or slightly raised above it. They have a brown or blackish disc that may be flat or slightly sunken (urceolate). The apothecia lack a well-developed exciple – the ring of tissue surrounding the hymenium in many lichens. Instead, they have a thick subhymenium, which is the layer of tissue below the hymenium where the asci develop.

The asci (spore-producing cells) are cylindrical or club-shaped and typically contain 8 spores, though some species may have up to 16 spores per ascus. The ascospores are ellipsoid, colourless when young but may become slightly brownish with age. They are usually simple (without internal divisions) but can rarely be two-celled.

Gloeoheppia also produces asexual reproductive structures called pycnidia, which are flask-shaped and immersed in the thallus. These produce small, rod-shaped conidia (asexual spores).

== Habitat and distribution ==
Gloeoheppia species are primarily found in warm, arid environments. They are typically calcicolous, meaning they grow on calcareous substrates such as limestone or dolomite. However, some species have also been observed growing on volcanic rock. These lichens are often found in exposed locations, such as on soil in rock crevices, depressions in lava flows, or on the surfaces of boulders and cliffs. They seem well-adapted to withstand periods of drought and high light intensity, which are common in their preferred habitats.

The genus has a relatively limited known distribution, with species recorded primarily in the following regions:

- Mediterranean: Species of Gloeoheppia have been found in various Mediterranean countries.
- Macaronesia: Several species have been collected from the Canary Islands, particularly on Fuerteventura and Lanzarote.
- Sahara-Arabian region: Specimens have been recorded from North African countries like Algeria and Tunisia, as well as from Middle Eastern locations such as Israel and Saudi Arabia.
- North America: Gloeoheppia polyspora, is known only from Mexico, specifically from the state of Oaxaca. G. squamulosa is found in the northwestern United States and Baja Mexico.

The distribution of Gloeoheppia species appears to be influenced by both climate and substrate availability. Their presence often indicates areas with a combination of calcareous or volcanic geology and arid to semi-arid climatic conditions.

== Species ==
- Gloeoheppia erosa (J.Steiner) Marton (1982)
- Gloeoheppia polyspora Henssen (1995)
- Gloeoheppia rugosa Henssen (1995)
- Gloeoheppia squamulosa (Zahlbr.) M.Schultz (2007)
- Gloeoheppia turgida (Ach.) Gyeln. (1935)

Prieto and colleagues accepted five species in the genus in their 2024 revision, but noted that G. turgida may represent more than one lineage and mentioned an undescribed species reported from South Arabia.
