= Pseudopeltula =

Scientific classification
- Kingdom: Fungi
- Division: Ascomycota
- Class: Lichinomycetes
- Order: Lichinales
- Family: Lichinaceae
- Genus: Pseudopeltula; Henssen (1995)

Type species
- Pseudopeltula myriocarpa Henssen (1995)

Species
- P. dicyanophora P. heppioides P. myriocarpa P. necrocorticata

Genus of lichen-forming fungi

Pseudopeltula is a genus of lichen-forming fungi in the family Lichinaceae. Established in 1995 by the lichenologist Aino Henssen, the genus currently includes four recognised species. These small cyanolichens are characterised by their squamulose (scaly) to peltate (shield-shaped) thalli, which lack a lower cortex and are attached to the substrate by rhizines. A key feature of Pseudopeltula is its complex apothecia (fruiting bodies), which have hymenia that often become divided by sterile tissue as they mature. The genus is primarily found in arid and semi-arid regions of North America, Mexico, and the Caribbean, where species typically grow on soil, rock, or thin soil over rock, often forming part of biological soil crusts in desert environments.

== Taxonomy ==
The genus Pseudopeltula was established in 1995 by lichenologist Aino Henssen, with P. myriocarpa assigned as the type species. In a recent re-classification of the Lichinomycetes, Pseudopeltula is treated as belonging to the family Lichinaceae (order Lichinales). Prieto and colleagues noted that attempts to obtain DNA sequences from Pseudopeltula have failed, so its placement is based on morphology rather than molecular data. They considered it closely related to Gloeoheppia and differing mainly in the distinctly divided hymenium of the apothecia. The genus was originally placed in the family Gloeoheppiaceae by Henssen, but Prieto and colleagues did not support recognising that family as distinct in their phylogenetic framework.

Pseudopeltula was initially distinguished from the closely related genus Gloeoheppia based on its complex apothecia with divided hymenia. However, later observations revealed some overlap in this characteristic between the two genera, leading to debate about their distinction.

== Description ==
Pseudopeltula species are small, lichenised fungi that form a symbiotic relationship with cyanobacteria. Their main body, the thallus, is typically squamulose (composed of small, scale-like structures) to peltate (shield-shaped and attached at a central point). The thallus lacks a lower cortex (a protective layer on the underside) and attaches to the substrate via rhizines, which are root-like structures composed of fungal filaments. The upper surface of the thallus can be smooth, cracked, or wrinkled, and its colour is usually yellowish-olive to dark olive.

Internally, the thallus has a distinctive structure. The photobiont layer, which contains the cyanobacterial partner, is composed of a single-celled cyanobacterium, likely belonging to the genus Chroococcidiopsis. The fungal hyphae form a network around these cyanobacterial cells. A unique feature observed in some species, such as P. necrocorticata, is the presence of a phenocortex, also known as a "false cortex". This is an upper layer composed of dead fungal and cyanobacterial cells, which suggests that the thallus grows not only at the margins but also upwards.

The apothecia (reproductive structures) are a defining characteristic of Pseudopeltula. These are typically immersed in the thallus or only slightly protruding, with a reddish-brown to dark brown disc. A key feature is that the hymenium (the spore-producing layer) often becomes divided by sterile tissue as it matures, creating a complex internal structure. The asci (spore-containing sacs) in Pseudopeltula usually contain eight spores, although this can vary between species. The spores themselves are typically ellipsoid and colourless.

== Habitat and distribution ==
Pseudopeltula species are primarily found in arid and semi-arid regions of North America, Mexico, and the Caribbean. They are particularly well-represented in the Sonoran Desert region, which spans parts of the southwestern United States and northwestern Mexico. These lichens typically grow on a variety of substrates. They can be found on bare soil, thin layers of soil over rock, or directly on rock surfaces. Some species show a preference for specific rock types. For instance, P. heppioides has been recorded growing on volcanic rock in Baja California Sur.

Pseudopeltula species often form part of biological soil crusts in desert and semi-desert environments. They can be found in various microhabitats within these ecosystems, from open, exposed areas to slightly shaded spots under desert shrubs. For example, P. necrocorticata has been collected from east-facing coastal slopes, plains with cacti and other desert vegetation, and on gravel at mountain slopes. The genus appears to be adapted to harsh environmental conditions, including high light intensity, extreme temperatures, and limited water availability. This is evidenced by their presence in habitats such as the thornbush vegetation of Baja California and the coastal shrublands of northern Mexico.

== Species ==
Four species are accepted in Pseudopeltula:

- Pseudopeltula dicyanophora Henssen (1995)
- Pseudopeltula heppioides Henssen (1995)
- Pseudopeltula myriocarpa Henssen (1995)
- Pseudopeltula necrocorticata Büdel & M.Schultz (2011)
