= Pseudopeltula heppioides =

Scientific classification
- Kingdom: Fungi
- Division: Ascomycota
- Class: Lichinomycetes
- Order: Lichinales
- Family: Lichinaceae
- Genus: Pseudopeltula
- Species: P. heppioides

Binomial name
- Pseudopeltula heppioides Henssen (1995)

Species of lichen-forming fungus

Pseudopeltula heppioides is a species of lichen in the family Lichinaceae. It forms small, greenish-olive, shield-shaped scales on volcanic rock. The species is distinguished by its fruiting bodies, in which the spore-producing layer (hymenium) becomes divided into many small compartments as it matures. It is known only from Baja California Sur in northwestern Mexico.

== Taxonomy ==
Pseudopeltula heppioides was described as a new species in 1995 by the lichenologist Aino Henssen, in her treatment of the family Gloeoheppiaceae (order Lichinales). In that framework, Pseudopeltula is one of the New World genera, and P. heppioides is the species in the genus characterized by having a hymenium that becomes multiply divided and partitioned into small units, each enclosed by its own excipulum.

Henssen chose the epithet heppioides because the small, peltate thallus resembles lichens in the genus Heppia. She noted that it can look like Heppia adglutinata and could be confused with it, but the internal structure of the thallus, the asci and ascospores, and the early development of the apothecia fit Gloeoheppiaceae (especially Gloeoheppia turgida). The mature apothecia differ from those of G. turgida in that sterile hyphal strands subdivide the hymenium, and the tissue ultimately becomes separated into many small compartments with darkened excipular margins; the ridged disc surface reflects those protruding margins. A 2024 phylogenetic reclassification of the Lichinomycetes did not support recognising a separate family for Gloeoheppia (Gloeoheppiaceae), and instead treated the genus within Lichinaceae.

== Description ==
The thallus is greenish olive and peltate, forming small, rounded units up to about 3 mm across. It is attached to the substrate by rhizoidal strands, and the lower surface is described as smooth (not tomentose). The upper surface is smooth to cracked, and in section the thallus is about 95–210 μm thick. The fungal hyphae (about 2.5–5.5 μm thick) form a reticulum (a net-like structure) around the single-celled cyanobacterial photobiont.

The apothecia are immersed and urn-shaped (urceolate), with brown discs up to about 0.4 mm wide that may appear faintly ridged. Internally, the hymenium (95–140 μm thick) and subhymenium (60–70 μm tall) react I+ (blue and then brown-red), and the mature hymenium becomes partitioned into multiple small segments, each surrounded by an excipulum. The asci are 8-spored (about 83–99 × 9.5–10.5 μm), and the ellipsoid ascospores were reported as not well developed in the studied material (about 10.5–14 × 6–8.5 μm). Pycnidia were not observed.

== Habitat and distribution ==
The type specimen was collected on volcanic rock in Mexico, Baja California Sur (Sierra de la Giganta, about 33 miles southwest of Loreto). In Henssen's account, the species was known only from that type locality.
