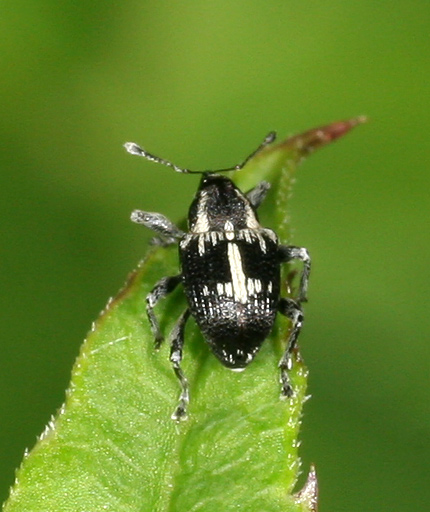
- Type of Beetle

Scientific classification
- Domain: Eukaryota
- Kingdom: Animalia
- Phylum: Arthropoda
- Class: Insecta
- Order: Coleoptera
- Suborder: Polyphaga
- Infraorder: Cucujiformia
- Family: Curculionidae
- Genus: Archarius; Gistel, 1856

= Archarius =

Genus of beetles

Archarius is a genus of beetle belonging to the family Curculionidae.

The genus was first described by Gistel in 1856.

The species of this genus are found in Europe, Japan and Northern America.

Species:

- Archarius crux
- Archarius pyrrhoceras
- Archarius salicivorus
