= Foleyola =

Scientific classification
- Kingdom: Plantae
- Clade: Tracheophytes
- Clade: Angiosperms
- Clade: Eudicots
- Clade: Rosids
- Order: Brassicales
- Family: Brassicaceae
- Genus: Foleyola; Maire
- Species: F. billotii

Binomial name
- Foleyola billotii Maire

Genus of plants

Foleyola is a monotypic genus belonging to the Brassicaceae family. Its only species is Foleyola billotii native to North Africa in Algeria, Mauritania and Morocco.

== Taxonomy ==
Foleyola billotii was first described by René Maire. The individual flowers have purple petals and are spaced along the inflorescence. Its growth habit is as a shrub. It grows in arid areas. The number of chromosomes is n=16.
