= Muricaria =

Scientific classification
- Kingdom: Plantae
- Clade: Tracheophytes
- Clade: Angiosperms
- Clade: Eudicots
- Clade: Rosids
- Order: Brassicales
- Family: Brassicaceae
- Genus: Muricaria; Desv.
- Species: M. prostrata

Binomial name
- Muricaria prostrata (Desf.) Desv.

Synonyms
- Bunias prostrata Desf. (1798) (basionym); Calepina prostrata (Desf.) Spreng.; Laelia prostrata (Desf.) Pers.; Muricaria battandieri Hochr.; Muricaria battandieri var. subintegrifolia Hochr.; Muricaria prostrata var. battandieri (Hochr.) Pamp.; Myagrum prostratum (Desf.) Poir.

Genus of plants

Muricaria is a genus of flowering plants belonging to the family Brassicaceae. It includes a single species, Muricaria prostrata, which is native to Algeria, Libya, Morocco and Tunisia in North Africa.
