= Johann Christoph Schleicher =

Swiss botanist, bryologist, mycologist, pteridologist and algologist of German origin

Johann Christoph Schleicher (26 February 1768 – 27 August 1834) was a Swiss botanist, bryologist, mycologist, pteridologist and algologist of German origin. He founded a botanical garden in Bex, and a herbarium trade.

== Biography ==
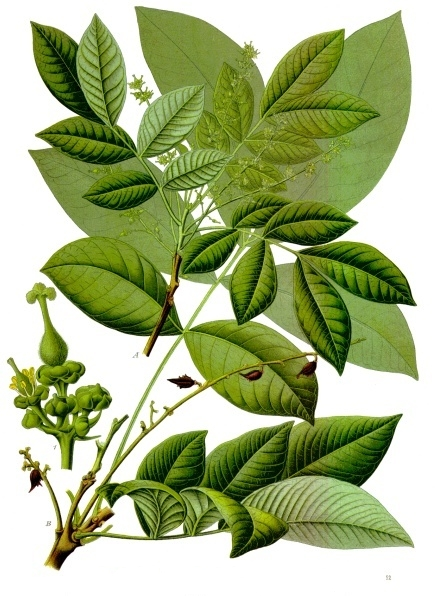
Schleichera three-pair

He was born on 26 February 1768 (according to other sources - in 1770) in the family of Anna Maria Savitsky. He was adopted by Karl Schleicher after the death of his father. In 1797 he married Julie Ricou, daughter of the physician Jean-David Ricou. Schleicher settled in Bévieux sur Bex around 1800, where he worked in a pharmacy. He was also the owner of a company selling plants and herbarium specimens. He created the first botanical garden in the canton of Vaud in the city of Bevieux and is considered to be the inventor of the commercial catalogs of plants, of which he published the first copy of 76 pages in 1800. It was followed by other editions, in 1807, 1815, and 1821. Schleicher was the first scientist to use mercury chloride to store herbarium specimens.

Johann Christoph died in Bex on 27 August 1834.

Currently, the bulk of Schleicher's herbarium specimens are kept in the Geneva Botanical Garden and the Lausanne Museum and Botanical Garden (LAU).

== Selected works ==
Schleicher, JC (1800). Catalogus plantarum in Helvetia. 76 p.

1805-1807. Plantae Cryptogamae Helveticae, quas in Locis Earum Natalibus Collegit et Exsiccavit J.C. Schleicher Cent. 1 à 5 : nos 1-500. Bex, Suiza (Exsiccata work).

The standard author abbreviation Schleich. is used to indicate this person as the author when citing a botanical name.
